= 2022 Canadian Figure Skating Championships =

2022 Canadian championship in figure skating

2022 Canadian National Skating Championships
- Type: National championship
- Date: January 6–12
- Season: 2021–22
- Location: Ottawa, Ontario
- Host: Skate Canada
- Venue: TD Place Arena

Champions
- Men's singles: Keegan Messing (S); Anthony Paradis (J)
- Women's singles: Madeline Schizas (S); Justine Miclette (J)
- Pairs: Kirsten Moore-Towers / Michael Marinaro (S); Brooke McIntosh / Benjamin Mimar (J)
- Ice dance: Piper Gilles / Paul Poirier (S); Natalie D'Alessandro / Bruce Waddell (J)
- Previous: 2020 Canadian Championships
- Next: 2023 Canadian Championships

The 2022 Canadian Tire National Skating Championships were held on January 6–12, 2022 in Ottawa, Ontario. Medals were awarded in the disciplines of men's singles, women's singles, pairs, and ice dance on the senior, junior, and novice levels. The results were part of the Canadian selection criteria for the 2022 World Championships, the 2022 Four Continents Championships, the 2022 World Junior Championships, and the 2022 Winter Olympics.

Ottawa was announced as the host in February 2021. The city has hosted the event eleven times previously. Competitors qualified at the Skate Canada Challenge in January.

On December 30, 2021, due to the Omicron variant and Ontario COVID-19 public health orders, it was announced that the competition would be held behind closed doors with no spectators, and all tickets refunded. Competitions for the novice level were also postponed to an undetermined future date. The event was later rescheduled for February 26–27 in Calgary, Alberta.

== Entries ==
A list of entries was posted prior to the competition.

=== Senior ===
Men	Women	Pairs	Ice dance
Wesley Chiu	Emily Bausback	Patricia Andrew / Steven Adcock	Jessica Lee Behiel / Jackson Behiel
Corey Circelli	Catherine Carle	Vanessa James / Eric Radford	Elysia-Marie Campbell / Liam Fawcett
Beres Clements	Gabrielle Daleman	Kelly Ann Laurin / Loucas Éthier	Alicia Fabbri / Paul Ayer
Max Denk	Sara-Maude Dupuis	Lori-Ann Matte / Thierry Ferland	Laurence Fournier Beaudry / Nikolaj Sørensen
Jack Dushenski	Angel Green	Kirsten Moore-Towers / Michael Marinaro	Piper Gilles / Paul Poirier
Stephen Gogolev	Béatrice Lavoie-Léonard	Deanna Stellato-Dudek / Maxime Deschamps	Lily Hensen / Nathan Lickers
Matthew Markell	Leah Lee	Evelyn Walsh / Trennt Michaud	Torri Hollstein / Joshua Burger
Keegan Messing	Michelle Long		Maia Iannetta / Liam Carr
Matthew Newnham	Véronik Mallet		Marjorie Lajoie / Zachary Lagha
Nam Nguyen	Katherine Medland Spence		Molly Lanaghan / Dmitre Razgulajevs
Conrad Orzel	Madison Moore		Marie-Jade Lauriault / Romain Le Gac
Joseph Phan	Lia Pereira		Haley Sales / Nikolas Wamsteeker
Aleksa Rakic	Alicia Pineault		Carolane Soucisse / Shane Firus
Marek Simon Ramilison	Jennyfer Richer-Labelle		
Roman Sadovsky	Alexandra Sarmiento Diaz		
Bennet Toman	Madeline Schizas		
Samuel Turcotte	Alison Schumacher		
Bruce Waddell	Amanda Tobin		

=== Junior ===
Men	Women	Pairs	Ice dance
Liam Carney	Lauren Batka	Emy Carignan / Bryan Pierro	Nadiia Bashynska / Peter Beaumont
Maksim Chelmaev	Fiona Bombardier	Summer Homick / Marty Haubrich	Chaïma Ben Khelifa / Everest Zhu
Simon Desmarais	Michelle Deng	Brooke McIntosh / Benjamin Mimar	Nicole Bolender / Aiden Dotzert
Yohnatan Elizarov	Audréanne Foster	Chloe Panetta / Kieran Thrasher	Mikala Cutler / Mackenzie Mah
Jackson Ellis	Vienna Harwood	Ashlyn Schmitz / Tristan Taylor	Natalie D'Alessandro / Bruce Waddell
Jake Ellis	Katherine Karon	Elizabeth Thibodeau-Mailhot / Daniel Villeneuve	Sydney Embro / Eric Millar
Alec Guinzbourg	Miriam Kleiman	Lily Wilberforce / Aidan Wright	Erica Estepa / Nolen Hickey
Christopher Hammer	Caitlyn Kukulowicz		Éliane Foroglou-Gadoury / Félix Desmarais
Terry Yu Tao Jin	Lulu Lin		Jamie Fournier / Anthony Haddad
John Kim	Julianne Lussier		Sandrine Gauthier / Quentin Thieren
Shohei Law	Cristina Lyons		Sophia Gover / Daniel Patriquin
Grayson Long	Alexa Matveev		Miku Makita / Tyler Gunara
Rio Morita	Justine Miclette		Savanna Martel / Kobi Chant
Christian Nainer	Marie-Maude Pomerleau		Chloe Nguyen / Alec Roueche
William Oddson	Natalie Roccatani		Alyssa Robinson / Jacob Portz
Anthony Paradis	Ashley Sales		Hailey Yu / Brendan Giang
Ethan Scott	Marie-Raphaële Savoie		
Jonathan Wu	Rose Théroux		

== Medal summary ==
=== Senior ===
Discipline	Gold	Silver	Bronze
Men	Keegan Messing	Roman Sadovsky	Wesley Chiu
Women	Madeline Schizas	Véronik Mallet	Gabrielle Daleman
Pairs	Kirsten Moore-Towers / Michael Marinaro	Evelyn Walsh / Trennt Michaud	Deanna Stellato-Dudek / Maxime Deschamps
Ice dance	Piper Gilles / Paul Poirier	Laurence Fournier Beaudry / Nikolaj Sørensen	Marjorie Lajoie / Zachary Lagha

=== Junior ===
Discipline	Gold	Silver	Bronze
Men	Anthony Paradis	Grayson Long	John Kim
Women	Justine Miclette	Fiona Bombardier	Michelle Deng
Pairs	Brooke McIntosh / Benjamin Mimar	Summer Homick / Marty Haubrich	Emy Carignan / Bryan Pierro
Ice dance	Natalie D'Alessandro / Bruce Waddell	Nadiia Bashynska / Peter Beaumont	Miku Makita / Tyler Gunara

== Senior results ==
=== Senior men ===
Stephen Gogolev withdrew a day prior to the event due to testing positive for COVID-19.

Rank	Name	Total points	SP		FS	
1	Keegan Messing	258.03	1	84.38	1	173.65
2	Roman Sadovsky	247.60	4	77.17	2	170.43
3	Wesley Chiu	232.04	2	81.47	5	150.57
4	Joseph Phan	231.50	3	78.14	3	153.36
5	Corey Circelli	229.61	5	76.64	4	152.97
6	Nam Nguyen	202.04	7	71.27	8	130.77
7	Jack Dushenski	195.09	10	72.83	9	128.02
8	Aleksa Rakic	193.15	13	61.47	7	131.68
9	Conrad Orzel	192.92	14	59.13	6	133.79
10	Samuel Turcotte	189.71	11	66.99	10	122.79
11	Matthew Markell	187.74	9	68.31	12	119.43
12	Max Denk	185.91	12	64.54	11	121.37
13	Beres Clements	185.28	8	68.93	15	116.35
14	Bennet Toman	179.39	6	72.83	16	106.56
15	Matthew Newnham	176.76	15	58.04	13	118.72
16	Bruce Waddell	172.51	17	54.88	14	117.63
17	Marek Simon Ramilison	160.01	16	56.03	17	103.98

=== Senior women ===
Rank	Name	Total points	SP		FS	
1	Madeline Schizas	198.24	1	72.05	1	126.19
2	Véronik Mallet	170.65	2	59.35	2	111.30
3	Gabrielle Daleman	167.50	3	58.48	3	109.02
4	Michelle Long	160.90	4	57.14	5	103.76
5	Alison Schumacher	159.36	6	56.38	6	102.98
6	Katherine Medland Spence	158.39	7	55.74	7	102.65
7	Alicia Pineault	156.33	9	50.31	4	106.02
8	Amanda Tobin	156.01	8	53.39	8	102.62
9	Emily Bausback	148.91	5	56.82	11	92.09
10	Lia Pereira	144.36	13	48.37	9	95.99
11	Sara-Maude Dupuis	141.05	10	50.18	13	90.87
12	Catherine Carle	139.51	16	46.51	10	93.00
13	Madison Moore	138.77	15	47.46	12	91.31
14	Béatrice Lavoie-Léonard	133.43	14	48.34	15	85.09
15	Angel Green	131.59	12	48.39	16	83.20
16	Jennyfer Richer-Labelle	126.90	18	41.33	14	85.57
17	Alexandra Sarmiento Diaz	118.35	17	42.11	17	76.24
18	Leah Lee	112.55	11	48.64	18	63.91

=== Senior pairs ===
Rank	Name	Total points	SP		FS	
1	Kirsten Moore-Towers / Michael Marinaro	212.54	1	73.02	1	139.52
2	Evelyn Walsh / Trennt Michaud	186.52	2	66.88	2	119.64
3	Deanna Stellato-Dudek / Maxime Deschamps	178.60	3	63.54	4	115.06
4	Lori-Ann Matte / Thierry Ferland	176.65	5	60.13	3	116.52
5	Patricia Andrew / Steven Adcock	161.57	6	56.37	5	105.20
6	Kelly Ann Laurin / Loucas Éthier	148.77	7	49.93	6	98.84
WD	Vanessa James / Eric Radford	withdrew	4	63.33	withdrew from competition	

=== Senior ice dance ===
Rank	Name	Total points	RD		FD	
1	Piper Gilles / Paul Poirier	219.24	1	86.98	1	132.26
2	Laurence Fournier Beaudry / Nikolaj Sørensen	206.65	2	81.04	2	125.61
3	Marjorie Lajoie / Zachary Lagha	192.67	3	76.67	3	116.00
4	Carolane Soucisse / Shane Firus	182.54	4	72.55	5	109.99
5	Marie-Jade Lauriault / Romain Le Gac	181.74	5	71.29	4	110.45
6	Haley Sales / Nikolas Wamsteeker	173.59	6	70.00	7	103.59
7	Alicia Fabbri / Paul Ayer	171.15	8	66.43	6	104.72
8	Molly Lanaghan / Dmitre Razgulajevs	169.86	7	67.51	8	102.35
9	Lily Hensen / Nathan Lickers	149.70	9	57.03	9	92.67
10	Elysia-Marie Campbell / Liam Fawcett	144.93	12	54.94	10	89.99
11	Jessica Lee Behiel / Jackson Behiel	141.52	10	56.60	11	84.92
12	Maia Iannetta / Liam Carr	140.72	11	56.00	12	84.72
13	Torri Hollstein / Joshua Burger	130.78	13	51.41	13	79.37

== Junior results ==
=== Junior men ===
Rank	Name	Total points	SP		FS	
1	Anthony Paradis	189.57	4	61.54	1	128.03
2	Grayson Long	189.15	1	64.18	3	124.97
3	John Kim	187.52	3	61.98	2	125.54
4	Rio Morita	175.05	6	57.84	4	117.21
5	Maksim Chelmaev	164.19	5	59.62	5	104.57
6	Shohei Law	160.08	7	56.82	6	103.26
7	Jake Ellis	147.04	8	52.78	7	94.26
8	Jackson Ellis	139.68	9	49.03	8	90.65
9	Yohnatan Elizarov	137.29	10	47.54	9	89.75
10	Terry Yu Tao Jin	136.57	2	62.42	14	74.15
11	Christian Nainer	126.30	13	46.11	10	80.19
12	Simon Desmarais	124.02	12	46.13	11	77.89
13	William Oddson	122.57	11	47.21	13	75.36
14	Ethan Scott	114.54	14	44.20	15	70.34
15	Liam Carney	113.16	15	36.85	12	76.31
16	Christopher Hammer	105.26	16	35.06	16	70.20

=== Junior women ===
Rank	Name	Total points	SP		FS	
1	Justine Miclette	170.01	1	61.43	1	108.58
2	Fiona Bombardier	158.71	4	53.31	2	105.40
3	Michelle Deng	152.01	5	51.98	3	100.03
4	Julianne Lussier	144.39	11	48.61	4	95.78
5	Ashley Sales	142.10	6	51.42	6	90.68
6	Audréanne Foster	140.58	3	53.41	13	87.17
7	Lauren Batka	138.37	10	48.16	7	90.21
8	Rose Théroux	138.13	7	50.82	11	87.31
9	Lulu Lin	137.78	16	43.54	5	94.24
10	Caitlyn Kukulowicz	137.15	8	49.68	10	87.47
11	Miriam Kleiman	136.93	9	49.24	9	87.69
12	Cristina Lyons	136.35	13	48.23	8	88.12
13	Natalie Roccatini	135.07	14	47.77	12	87.30
14	Vienna Harwood	130.65	2	53.74	17	76.91
15	Marie-Raphaële Savoie	129.99	15	46.53	14	83.46
16	Katherine Karon	129.00	12	48.39	16	80.61
17	Marie-Maude Pomerleau	121.95	17	39.35	15	82.60

=== Junior pairs ===
Rank	Name	Total points	SP		FS	
1	Brooke McIntosh / Benjamin Mimar	155.95	1	56.91	1	99.04
2	Summer Homick / Marty Haubrich	136.24	2	52.03	3	84.21
3	Emy Carignan / Bryan Pierro	133.85	3	47.59	2	86.26
4	Chloe Panetta / Kieran Thrasher	125.73	4	47.58	5	78.15
5	Lily Wilberforce / Aidan Wright	124.55	7	42.68	4	81.87
5	Elizabeth Thibodeau-Mailhot / Daniel Villeneuve	121.22	5	46.15	6	75.07
6	Ashlyn Schmitz / Tristan Taylor	109.77	6	44.43	7	65.34

=== Junior ice dance ===
Rank	Name	Total points	RD		FD	
1	Natalie D'Alessandro / Bruce Waddell	175.03	1	70.79	1	104.24
2	Nadiia Bashynska / Peter Beaumont	170.79	2	70.66	2	100.13
3	Miku Makita / Tyler Gunara	163.00	3	65.88	3	97.12
4	Hailey Yu / Brendan Giang	147.52	4	58.51	4	89.01
5	Chaïma Ben Khelifa / Everest Zhu	144.82	6	55.91	5	88.91
6	Alyssa Robinson / Jacob Portz	141.21	5	56.56	7	84.65
7	Sandrine Gauthier / Quentin Thieren	138.77	8	52.46	6	86.31
8	Erica Estepa / Nolen Hickey	129.35	9	52.39	9	76.96
9	Sydney Embro / Eric Millar	127.62	7	52.76	12	74.86
10	Mikala Cutler / Mackenzie Mah	126.66	12	48.17	8	78.49
11	Savanna Martel / Kobi Chant	126.57	10	50.14	10	76.43
12	Chloe Nguyen / Alec Roueche	124.46	11	49.38	11	75.08
13	Éliane Foroglou-Gadoury / Félix Desmarais	121.71	13	47.35	13	74.36
14	Sophia Gover / Daniel Patriquin	116.58	14	46.56	14	70.02
15	Jamie Fournier / Anthony Haddad	112.14	16	44.83	15	67.31
16	Nicole Bolender / Aiden Dotzert	111.43	15	46.07	16	65.36

== International team selections ==
=== Four Continents Championships ===
The 2022 Four Continents Championships were held from January 18–23 in Tallinn, Estonia. Teams were selected using the International Teams Selection Criteria. The entire team was named on January 9, 2022.

	Men	Women	Pairs	Ice dance
1	~~Wesley Chiu~~ (withdrew)	Gabrielle Daleman	Lori-Ann Matte / Thierry Ferland	Marie-Jade Lauriault / Romain Le Gac
2	Corey Circelli	Véronik Mallet	Deanna Stellato-Dudek / Maxime Deschamps	Haley Sales / Nikolas Wamsteeker
3	Joseph Phan	Alison Schumacher	Evelyn Walsh / Trennt Michaud	Carolane Soucisse / Shane Firus

=== Olympic Games ===
The 2022 Winter Olympics were held from February 4–20 in Beijing, China. Teams were selected using the International Teams Selection Criteria. The entire team was named on January 9, 2022.

	Men	Women	Pairs	Ice dance
1	Keegan Messing	Madeline Schizas	Vanessa James / Eric Radford	Laurence Fournier Beaudry / Nikolaj Sørensen
2	Roman Sadovsky		Kirsten Moore-Towers / Michael Marinaro	Piper Gilles / Paul Poirier
3				Marjorie Lajoie / Zachary Lagha

=== World Junior Championships ===
Commonly referred to as "Junior Worlds", the 2022 World Junior Championships were held from April 13–17 in Tallinn, Estonia. Teams were selected using the International Teams Selection Criteria. The initial entire team was named on January 14, 2022. Alternates and substitutions have been published by the ISU on March 25, 2022.

The pair team of Homick and Haubrich failed to obtain the Short Program minimum Technical Elements Score by 0.85 points at the 2022 Bavarian Open. Consequently, on February 6, they have been replaced by 4th place holders Panetta and Thrasher, who already met all their TES.

	Men	Women	Pairs	Ice dance
1	Wesley Chiu	Justine Miclette	~~Summer Homick / Marty Haubrich~~ (replaced)	Nadiia Bashynska / Peter Beaumont
2	Stephen Gogolev	Lia Pereira	Brooke McIntosh / Benjamin Mimar	Natalie D'Alessandro / Bruce Waddell
1st alt.	Corey Circelli	Sara-Maude Dupuis	Chloe Panetta / Kieran Thrasher (called up)	Miku Makita / Tyler Gunara
2nd alt.	Aleksa Rakic	Audréanne Foster		Hailey Yu / Brendan Giang

=== World Championships ===
The 2022 World Championships were held from March 21–27 in Montpellier, France. Teams were selected using the International Teams Selection Criteria. The initial entire team was named on January 9, 2022. Alternates and substitutions have been published by the ISU on March 2, 2022.

	Men	Women	Pairs	Ice dance
1	Keegan Messing	Madeline Schizas	Vanessa James / Eric Radford	Laurence Fournier Beaudry / Nikolaj Sørensen
2	Roman Sadovsky		~~Kirsten Moore-Towers / Michael Marinaro~~ (withdrew)	Piper Gilles / Paul Poirier
3				Marjorie Lajoie / Zachary Lagha
1st alt.	Nam Nguyen	Gabrielle Daleman	Evelyn Walsh / Trennt Michaud (called up)	Marie-Jade Lauriault / Romain Le Gac
2nd alt.	Conrad Orzel	Alison Schumacher	Lori-Ann Matte / Thierry Ferland	Haley Sales / Nikolas Wamsteeker
3rd alt.			Deanna Stellato-Dudek / Maxime Deschamps	Carolane Soucisse / Shane Firus
