= 2021 CS Autumn Classic International =

- Type: ISU Challenger Series
- Date: September 16 – 18
- Season: 2021–22
- Location: Montreal, Quebec, Canada
- Host: Skate Canada
- Venue: Sportplexe Pierrefonds

Champions
- Men's singles: (Canada) Conrad Orzel
- Women's singles: (Cyprus) Marilena Kitromilis
- Pairs: (Japan) Riku Miura / Ryuichi Kihara
- Ice dance: (Canada) Piper Gilles / Paul Poirier
- Previous: 2019 CS Autumn Classic International
- Next: 2023 CS Autumn Classic International
- Previous CS: 2021 CS Lombardia Trophy
- Next CS: 2021 CS Nebelhorn Trophy

The 2021 CS Autumn Classic International was held on September 16–18, 2021 in Montreal, Quebec, Canada. It was part of the 2021–22 ISU Challenger Series. Medals were awarded in men's singles, women's singles, pair skating, and ice dance, although the men's event was not considered part of the Challenger Series due to the entry requirements not being met.

== Entries ==
The International Skating Union published the list of entries on August 24, 2021.

| Country | Men | Women | Pairs | Ice dance |
|---|---|---|---|---|
| Austria | — | | Chloe Choinard / Livio Mayr | — |
| Canada | Samuel Angers | Emily Bausback | Vanessa James / Eric Radford | Piper Gilles / Paul Poirier |
| Canada | Beres Clements | Gabrielle Daleman | Lori-Ann Matte / Thierry Ferland | Marjorie Lajoie / Zachary Lagha |
| Canada | Nam Nguyen | Alison Schumacher | Deanna Stellato-Dudek / Maxime Deschamps | Haley Sales / Nikolas Wamsteeker |
| Canada | Conrad Orzel | — | — | Carolane Soucisse / Shane Firus |
| Canada | Bennet Toman | — | — | — |
| Chinese Taipei | — | Jenny Shyu | — | — |
| Cyprus | — | Marilena Kitromilis | — | — |
| Czech Republic | — | Eliška Březinová | — | — |
| Japan | — | — | Riku Miura / Ryuichi Kihara | — |
| New Zealand | — | — | — | Charlotte Lafond-Fournier / Richard Kang-in Kam |
| South Korea | — | Ji Seo-yeon | — | — |
| South Korea | — | Lee Si-won | — | — |
| South Korea | — | You Young | — | — |
| Spain | — | — | — | Olivia Smart / Adrián Díaz |
| Switzerland | — | — | Jessica Pfund / Joshua Santillan | — |
| United States | — | Starr Andrews | Ashley Cain-Gribble / Timothy LeDuc | Caroline Green / Michael Parsons |
| United States | — | Karen Chen | Katie McBeath / Nathan Bartholomay | — |

=== Changes to preliminary assignments ===
| Date | Discipline | Withdrew | Added | Notes | Ref. |
|---|---|---|---|---|---|
| August 25 | Men | (Latvia) Daniels Kockers | — | | |
| August 25 | Men | (Latvia) Kirills Korkacs | — | | |
| August 25 | Men | (Latvia) Deniss Vasiļjevs | — | | |
| August 25 | Women | (Latvia) Mariia Bolsheva | — | | |
| August 25 | Women | (Latvia) Angelīna Kučvaļska | — | | |
| August 25 | Women | (Latvia) Anete Lāce | — | | |
| August 26 | Ice dance | (Armenia) Tina Garabedian / Simon Proulx-Sénécal | — | | |
| September 1 | Men | (Mexico) Donovan Carrillo | — | Event conflict with U.S. Classic | |
| September 1 | Women | (Japan) Satoko Miyahara | — | Opted to remain in Japan | |
| September 1 | Ice dance | (France) Gabriella Papadakis / Guillaume Cizeron | — | | |
| September 1 | Ice dance | (United Kingdom) Lilah Fear / Lewis Gibson | — | | |
| September 8 | Men | (Canada) Joseph Phan | (Canada) Samuel Angers | | |
| September 8 | Men | (United States) Camden Pulkinen | (Canada) Beres Clements | Event conflict with U.S. Classic | |
| September 8 | Men | — | (Canada) Bennet Toman | | |
| September 8 | Pairs | — | (United States) Ashley Cain-Gribble / Timothy LeDuc | | |
| September 8 | Pairs | — | (United States) Katie McBeath / Nathan Bartholomay | | |
| September 14 | Pairs | (Canada) Evelyn Walsh / Trennt Michaud | — | | |
| September 15 | Women | (China) Lin Shan | — | | |
| September 15 | Women | (Chinese Taipei) Joelle Peijin Lin | — | | |
| September 15 | Ice dance | (China) Chen Hong / Sun Zhuoming | — | | |
| September 15 | Ice dance | (China) Wang Shiyue / Liu Xinyu | — | | |

== Results ==
=== Men's singles ===
Note: For this category, the 2021 Autumn Classic International was not considered a Challenger Series event, since the minimum required number of entries for a Challenger Series event was not reached.

| Rank | Name | Nation | Total points | SP | | FS | |
|---|---|---|---|---|---|---|---|
| 1 | Conrad Orzel | Canada | 207.31 | 1 | 80.82 | 1 | 126.49 |
| 2 | Bennet Toman | Canada | 172.33 | 2 | 63.30 | 2 | 109.03 |
| 3 | Beres Clements | Canada | 153.48 | 3 | 55.48 | 3 | 98.00 |

=== Women's singles ===
| Rank | Name | Nation | Total points | SP | | FS | |
|---|---|---|---|---|---|---|---|
| 1 | Marilena Kitromilis | Cyprus | 180.72 | 1 | 61.33 | 2 | 119.39 |
| 2 | You Young | South Korea | 180.25 | 3 | 60.66 | 1 | 119.59 |
| 3 | Ji Seo-yeon | South Korea | 173.69 | 2 | 60.67 | 4 | 113.02 |
| 4 | Karen Chen | United States | 173.00 | 5 | 58.01 | 3 | 114.99 |
| 5 | Starr Andrews | United States | 155.25 | 4 | 59.21 | 7 | 96.04 |
| 6 | Lee Si-won | South Korea | 153.70 | 7 | 52.31 | 5 | 101.39 |
| 7 | Emily Bausback | Canada | 149.32 | 9 | 51.61 | 6 | 97.71 |
| 8 | Gabrielle Daleman | Canada | 146.51 | 8 | 51.84 | 8 | 94.67 |
| 9 | Eliška Březinová | Czech Republic | 141.37 | 6 | 52.52 | 9 | 88.85 |
| 10 | Alison Schumacher | Canada | 127.06 | 10 | 47.51 | 10 | 79.55 |
| 11 | Jenny Shyu | Chinese Taipei | 113.04 | 11 | 40.24 | 11 | 72.80 |

=== Pairs ===
| Rank | Name | Nation | Total points | SP | | FS | |
|---|---|---|---|---|---|---|---|
| 1 | Riku Miura / Ryuichi Kihara | Japan | 204.06 | 1 | 72.32 | 1 | 131.74 |
| 2 | Vanessa James / Eric Radford | Canada | 184.01 | 2 | 68.29 | 2 | 115.72 |
| 3 | Ashley Cain-Gribble / Timothy LeDuc | United States | 170.64 | 3 | 59.58 | 5 | 111.06 |
| 4 | Deanna Stellato-Dudek / Maxime Deschamps | Canada | 169.91 | 4 | 57.83 | 3 | 112.08 |
| 5 | Katie McBeath / Nathan Bartholomay | United States | 168.61 | 5 | 56.60 | 4 | 112.01 |
| 6 | Jessica Pfund / Joshua Santillan | Switzerland | 146.83 | 6 | 53.39 | 6 | 93.44 |
| 7 | Lori-Ann Matte / Thierry Ferland | Canada | 140.44 | 7 | 51.17 | 7 | 89.27 |

=== Ice dance ===
| Rank | Name | Nation | Total points | RD | | FD | |
|---|---|---|---|---|---|---|---|
| 1 | Piper Gilles / Paul Poirier | Canada | 208.97 | 1 | 83.35 | 1 | 125.62 |
| 2 | Olivia Smart / Adrián Díaz | Spain | 191.31 | 2 | 75.20 | 2 | 116.11 |
| 3 | Caroline Green / Michael Parsons | United States | 188.43 | 3 | 73.93 | 3 | 114.50 |
| 4 | Marjorie Lajoie / Zachary Lagha | Canada | 181.74 | 4 | 71.27 | 4 | 110.47 |
| 5 | Carolane Soucisse / Shane Firus | Canada | 166.61 | 5 | 65.11 | 5 | 101.50 |
| 6 | Haley Sales / Nikolas Wamsteeker | Canada | 155.89 | 6 | 59.91 | 6 | 95.98 |
| 7 | Charlotte Lafond-Fournier / Richard Kang-in Kam | New Zealand | 144.98 | 7 | 58.88 | 7 | 86.10 |
