= Let's Take an Old-Fashioned Walk =

Let's Take an Old-Fashioned Walk may refer to:

- "Let's Take an Old-Fashioned Walk" (Irving Berlin song), a song by Irving Berlin for the 1949 musical Miss Liberty
- "Let's Take an Old-Fashioned Walk", a 1907 song recorded by Ada Jones and Billy Murray
