= 2020 Canadian Figure Skating Championships =

Figure skating competition

2020 Canadian National Skating Championships
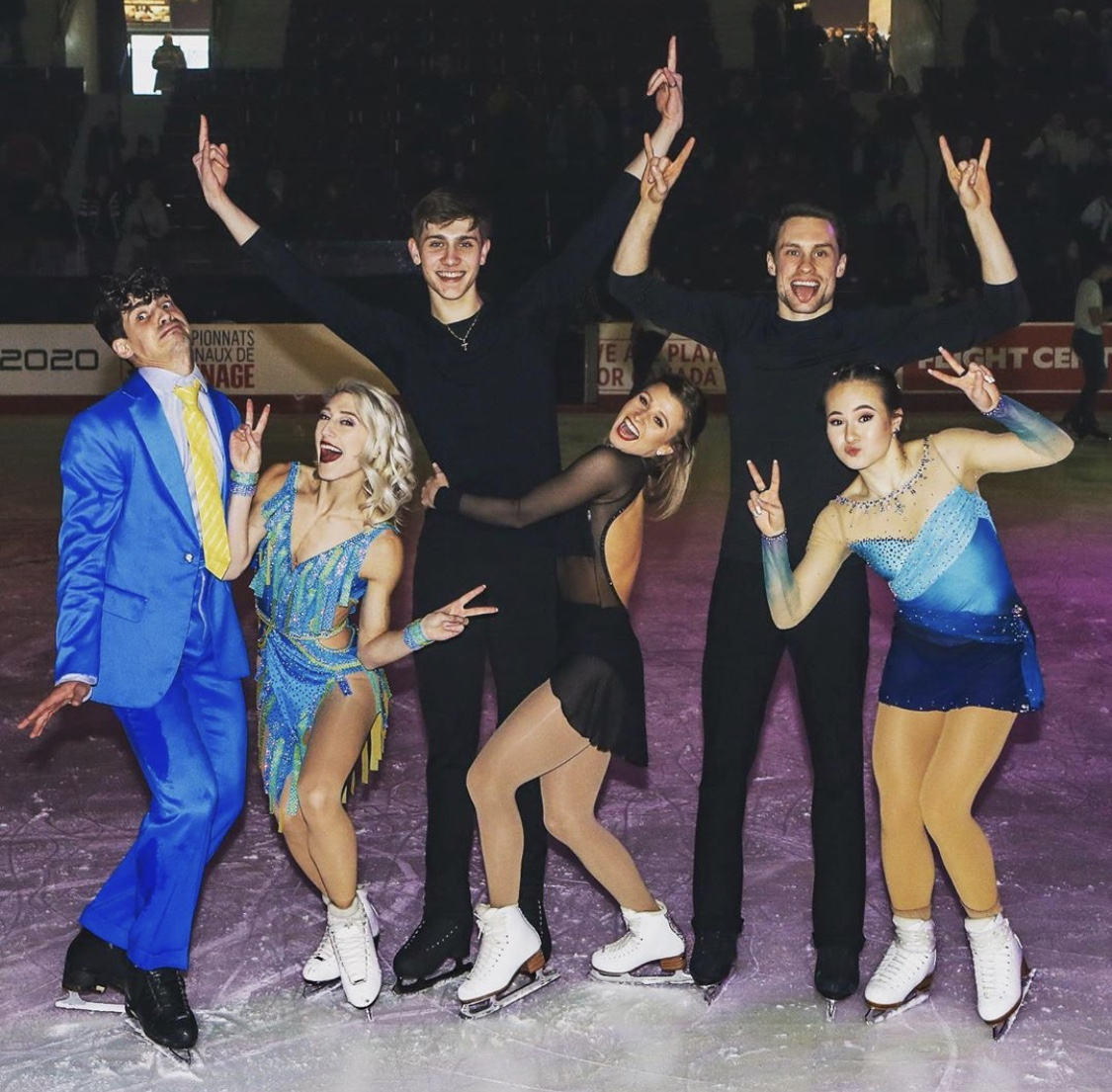
- 2020 Canadian national champions during the exhibition gala
- Type: National championship
- Date: January 13 – 19
- Season: 2019–20
- Location: Mississauga, Ontario
- Host: Skate Canada
- Venue: Paramount Fine Foods Centre

Champions
- Men's singles: Roman Sadovsky (S); Corey Circelli (J)
- Ladies' singles: Emily Bausback (S); Kaiya Ruiter (J)
- Pairs: Kirsten Moore-Towers / Michael Marinaro (S); Patricia Andrew / Zachary Daleman (J)
- Ice dance: Piper Gilles / Paul Poirier (S); Emmy Bronsard / Aissa Bouaraguia (J)
- Previous: 2019 Canadian Championships
- Next: 2022 Canadian Championships

The 2020 Canadian Tire National Skating Championships were held on January 13–19, 2020, in Mississauga, Ontario. Medals were awarded in the disciplines of men's singles, women's singles, pair skating, and ice dance on the senior, junior, and novice levels. Although the official International Skating Union terminology for female skaters in the singles category is ladies, Skate Canada uses women officially. The results were part of the Canadian selection criteria for the 2020 World Championships, the 2020 Four Continents Championships, and the 2020 World Junior Championships.

Mississauga was announced as the host in January 2019. The city previously hosted the event in 2013 and has also previously hosted Skate Canada International four times (2000, 2003, 2011, and 2016). Competitors qualified at the Skate Canada Challenge held in Edmonton, Alberta in December 2019 or earned a bye.

== Entries ==
A list of qualified skaters was published on December 20, 2019.

=== Senior ===
Men	Women	Pairs	Ice dance
Max Denk	Emily Bausback	Justine Brasseur / Mark Bardei	Elysia-Marie Campbell / Liam Fawcett
Jack Dushenski	Emma Bulawka	Chloe Choinard / Shaquille Davis	Rubie Diemer / Petr Paleev
Alistair Lam	Aurora Cotop	Liubov Ilyushechkina / Charlie Bilodeau	Alicia Fabbri / Paul Ayer
Alexander Lawrence	Gabrielle Daleman	Lori-Ann Matte / Thierry Ferland	Piper Gilles / Paul Poirier
Eric Liu	Hannah Dawson	Kirsten Moore-Towers / Michael Marinaro	Marjorie Lajoie / Zachary Lagha
Matthew Markell	Kim Decelles	Natasha Purich / Bryce Chudak	Molly Lanaghan / Dmitre Razgulajevs
Keegan Messing	Olivia Farrow	Deanna Stellato-Dudek / Maxime Deschamps	Estelle LeBlanc / Alex Leger
Philipp Mulé-Mirochnitchenk	Viviane Fontaine-Maltais	Evelyn Walsh / Trennt Michaud	Haley Sales / Nikolas Wamsteeker
Nicolas Nadeau	Valérie Giroux	Nadine Wang / Francis Boudreau-Audet	Carolane Soucisse / Shane Firus
Nam Nguyen	Béatrice Lavoie-Léonard		
Dawson Nodwell	Michelle Long		
Conrad Orzel	Véronik Mallet		
Joseph Phan	Amelia Orzel		
Marek Ramilison	Alicia Pineault		
Dominic Rondeau	Madeline Schizas		
Roman Sadovsky	Alison Schumacher		
Bennet Toman	Sarah Tamura		
	Amanda Tobin		

=== Junior ===
Men	Women	Pairs	Ice dance
Gabriel Blumenthal	Tsina Clemente	Patricia Andrew / Zachary Daleman	Nadiia Bashynska / Peter Beaumont
Brian Chiem	Erica Fallavollita	Shallen Bear / Marty Haubrich	Jessica-Lee Behiel / Jackson Behiel
Wesley Chiu	Nour-Houda Foura	Émy Carignan / Bryan Pierro	Chaima Ben Khelifa / Everest Zhu
Corey Circelli	Jaime Gabbard	Audrey Carle / Gabriel Farand	Amelia Boone / Malcolm Kowan
Antoine Goyette	Haley Gillett	Caidence Derenisky / Raine Eberl	Emmy Bronsard / Aissa Bouaraguia
Alec Guinzbourg	Britannie Grenier	Esther Feinberg / Alexandre Simard	Sydney Embro / Eric Millar
Juheon Lim	Gabriella Guo	Kelly-Ann Laurin / Loucas Éthier	Lily Hensen / Nathan Lickers
Rio Morita	Vienna Harwood	Cassandra Leung / Paxton Fletcher	Maia Iannetta / Liam Carr
Shuma Mugii	Kristina Ivanova	Gabrielle Levesque / Pier-Alexandre Hudon	Sophia Kagolovskaya / Kieran MacDonald
Matthew Newnham	Leah Lee	Camille Perreault / William St-Louis	Shaelene Katrayan / Jordan Derochie
Justin Ng-Siva	Alexa Matveev	Mackenzie Ripley / Owen Brawley	Jessica Li / Jacob Richmond
Bryan Pierro	Emily Millard		Hannah Lim / Ye Quan
Alexandre Simard	Carys Prodaniuk		Olivia McIsaac / Corey Circelli
William St-Louis	Emmanuelle Proft		Isabel McQuilkin / Jacob Portz
Tristan Taylor	Michelle Rivest		Olivia Tremblay / Émile Couture
	Kaiya Ruiter		
	Ashley Sales		
	Natalie Walker		

=== Changes to preliminary entries ===
Date	Discipline	Withdrew	Added	Reason/Other notes	Refs
January 8	Senior men	Stephen Gogolev	Dominic Rondeau		
January 8	Senior men	Iliya Kovler	Philipp Mulé-Mirochnitchenk		
January 8	Senior men	Beres Clements	N/A		
January 8	Senior pairs	Camille Ruest / Andrew Wolfe	N/A		
January 11	Senior women	Olivia Gran	Valérie Giroux		

== Medal summary ==
=== Senior ===
Discipline	Gold	Silver	Bronze
Men	Roman Sadovsky	Nam Nguyen	Keegan Messing
Women	Emily Bausback	Alison Schumacher	Madeline Schizas
Pairs	Kirsten Moore-Towers / Michael Marinaro	Evelyn Walsh / Trennt Michaud	Liubov Ilyushechkina / Charlie Bilodeau
Ice dance	Piper Gilles / Paul Poirier	Marjorie Lajoie / Zachary Lagha	Carolane Soucisse / Shane Firus

=== Junior ===
Discipline	Gold	Silver	Bronze
Men	Corey Circelli	Wesley Chiu	Alec Guinzbourg
Women	Kaiya Ruiter	Emily Millard	Kristina Ivanova
Pairs	Patricia Andrew / Zachary Daleman	Gabrielle Levesque / Pier-Alexandre Hudon	Kelly-Ann Laurin / Loucas Éthier
Ice dance	Emmy Bronsard / Aissa Bouaraguia	Nadiia Bashynska / Peter Beaumont	Olivia McIsaac / Corey Circelli

== Senior results ==
=== Men ===
Messing placed first in the short program while defending champion Nguyen was second. Sadovsky ranked first in the free skating and won the title with a 17-point margin.

Rank	Name	Total points	SP		FS	
1	Roman Sadovsky	260.57	3	85.02	1	175.55
2	Nam Nguyen	243.51	2	88.04	2	155.47
3	Keegan Messing	241.79	1	92.61	3	149.18
4	Joseph Phan	229.19	4	82.74	4	146.45
5	Nicolas Nadeau	219.10	6	73.83	5	145.27
6	Conrad Orzel	209.37	8	69.26	6	140.11
7	Eric Liu	201.85	5	77.30	9	124.55
8	Alexander Lawrence	198.56	10	68.09	8	130.47
9	Matthew Markell	198.44	11	64.27	7	134.17
10	Bennet Toman	191.43	7	72.35	10	119.08
11	Dawson Nodwell	179.01	9	68.38	13	110.63
12	Alistair Lam	178.76	12	62.57	11	116.19
13	Jack Dushenski	167.96	13	57.16	12	110.80
14	Max Denk	146.54	14	53.98	14	92.56
15	Marek Ramilison	144.62	15	53.52	15	91.10
16	Philipp Mulé-Mirochnitchenk	118.87	17	47.67	16	71.20
WD	Dominic Rondeau	withdrew	16	48.71	withdrew from competition	

=== Women ===
Pineault, who missed the previous edition due to injury, placed first in the short program. Bausback, fourth after the short, won the free skate and the title.

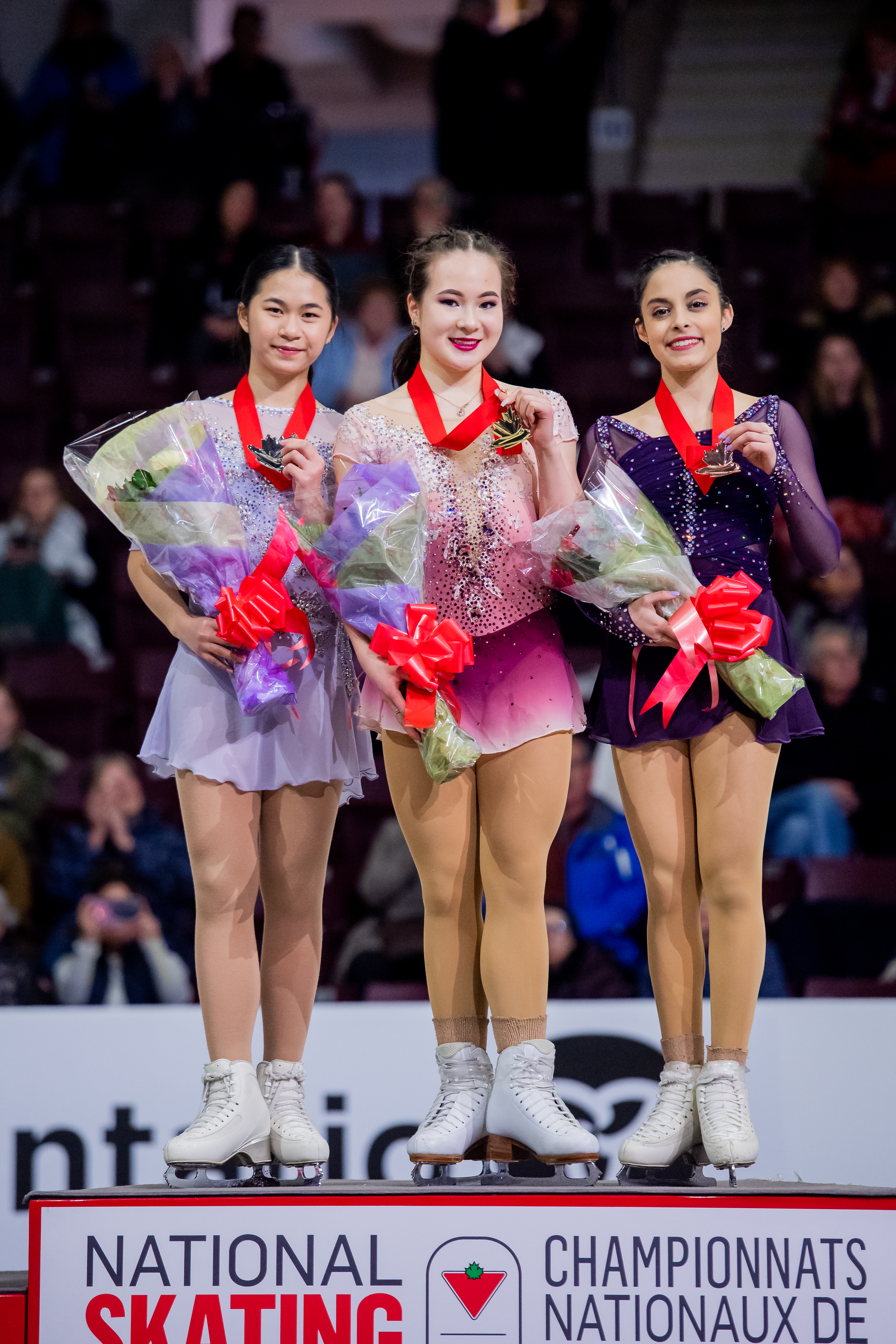
Senior women medalists

Rank	Name	Total points	SP		FS	
1	Emily Bausback	175.54	4	58.90	1	116.64
2	Alison Schumacher	168.94	6	55.95	2	112.99
3	Madeline Schizas	168.07	2	60.66	3	107.41
4	Alicia Pineault	165.77	1	63.15	5	102.62
5	Michelle Long	155.02	13	49.11	4	105.91
6	Emma Bulawka	148.88	14	48.49	6	100.39
7	Véronik Mallet	146.09	5	57.94	9	88.15
8	Gabrielle Daleman	145.68	3	59.51	13	86.17
9	Amelia Orzel	144.46	11	49.60	7	94.86
10	Amanda Tobin	140.65	10	49.64	8	91.01
11	Kim Decelles	139.61	7	53.42	12	86.19
12	Hannah Dawson	138.85	8	50.73	10	88.12
13	Béatrice Lavoie-Léonard	137.73	9	49.70	11	88.03
14	Olivia Farrow	125.27	18	42.76	14	82.51
15	Viviane Fontaine-Maltais	124.19	16	44.83	15	79.36
16	Valérie Giroux	117.35	15	45.77	16	71.58
17	Sarah Tamura	114.89	17	44.51	17	70.38
WD	Aurora Cotop	withdrew	12	49.42	withdrew from competition	

=== Pairs ===
Moore-Towers / Marinaro won the pairs' title after ranking first in both segments.

Rank	Name	Total points	SP		FS	
1	Kirsten Moore-Towers / Michael Marinaro	215.67	1	73.73	1	141.94
2	Evelyn Walsh / Trennt Michaud	196.29	3	70.34	2	125.95
3	Liubov Ilyushechkina / Charlie Bilodeau	186.71	2	71.23	3	115.48
4	Justine Brasseur / Mark Bardei	177.06	5	62.29	4	114.77
5	Lori-Ann Matte / Thierry Ferland	175.28	4	62.63	6	112.65
6	Deanna Stellato-Dudek / Maxime Deschamps	170.36	6	57.06	5	113.30
7	Natasha Purich / Bryce Chudak	153.67	7	55.33	7	98.34
8	Nadine Wang / Francis Boudreau-Audet	132.31	9	46.08	8	86.23
9	Chloe Choinard / Shaquille Davis	123.13	8	46.89	9	76.24

=== Ice dance ===
Gilles / Poirier won both segments of the event. They had a wardrobe malfunction in the rhythm dance when her hair became caught in his costume.

Rank	Name	Total points	RD		FD	
1	Piper Gilles / Paul Poirier	225.62	1	88.86	1	136.76
2	Marjorie Lajoie / Zachary Lagha	198.92	2	77.26	2	121.66
3	Carolane Soucisse / Shane Firus	190.29	3	75.83	3	114.46
4	Haley Sales / Nikolas Wamsteeker	176.82	6	64.96	4	111.86
5	Molly Lanaghan / Dmitre Razgulajevs	170.45	5	67.63	5	102.82
6	Alicia Fabbri / Paul Ayer	165.41	4	68.26	6	97.15
7	Elysia-Marie Campbell / Liam Fawcett	137.12	7	53.54	7	83.58
8	Rubie Diemer / Petr Paleev	126.03	8	49.06	8	76.97
9	Estelle LeBlanc / Alex Leger	82.72	9	29.84	9	52.88

== Junior results ==
=== Men ===
Rank	Name	Total points	SP		FS	
1	Corey Circelli	203.13	2	72.37	1	130.76
2	Wesley Chiu	198.44	1	76.12	4	122.32
3	Alec Guinzbourg	189.42	4	61.21	2	128.21
4	Gabriel Blumenthal	184.53	6	60.49	3	124.04
5	Matthew Newnham	180.63	3	68.58	6	112.05
6	Juheon Lim	176.56	5	60.76	5	115.80
7	Antoine Goyette	166.79	8	56.89	7	109.90
8	Tristan Taylor	156.46	7	57.03	9	99.43
9	Brian Chiem	155.50	9	55.40	8	100.10
10	Shuma Mugii	145.66	10	54.09	12	91.57
11	Bryan Pierro	141.33	12	51.48	13	89.85
12	Justin Ng-Siva	138.47	13	46.18	10	92.29
13	Rio Morita	134.07	15	42.28	11	91.79
14	William St-Louis	117.92	11	52.01	15	65.91
15	Alexandre Simard	116.46	14	44.33	14	72.13

=== Women ===
Rank	Name	Total points	SP		FS	
1	Kaiya Ruiter	174.83	1	59.30	1	115.53
2	Emily Millard	143.31	4	50.67	2	92.64
3	Kristina Ivanova	142.73	2	52.58	3	90.15
4	Leah Lee	137.11	5	49.53	5	87.58
5	Erica Fallavollita	136.61	6	47.67	4	88.94
6	Britannie Grenier	135.39	3	50.95	9	84.44
7	Ashley Sales	134.73	7	47.25	7	87.48
8	Alexa Matveev	134.30	9	46.80	6	87.50
9	Gabriella Guo	129.74	13	42.77	8	86.97
10	Jaime Gabbard	128.80	8	47.22	10	81.58
11	Emmanuelle Proft	124.40	12	45.42	11	78.98
12	Michelle Rivest	121.78	10	46.73	14	75.05
13	Vienna Harwood	121.28	11	46.45	15	74.83
14	Haley Gillett	117.43	14	41.27	12	76.16
15	Natalie Walker	116.34	15	41.11	13	75.23
16	Tsina Clemente	108.46	17	37.58	16	70.88
17	Nour-Houda Foura	105.97	16	40.06	17	65.91
18	Carys Prodaniuk	98.26	18	33.19	18	65.07

=== Pairs ===
Rank	Name	Total points	SP		FS	
1	Patricia Andrew / Zachary Daleman	148.28	1	56.73	1	91.55
2	Gabrielle Levesque / Pier-Alexandre Hudon	140.91	2	50.52	2	90.39
3	Kelly-Ann Laurin / Loucas Éthier	138.12	3	50.50	3	87.62
4	Caidence Derenisky / Raine Eberl	133.67	5	48.85	5	84.82
5	Chloé Panetta / Benjamin Mimar	132.24	9	44.92	4	87.32
6	Esther Feinberg / Alexandre Simard	130.58	6	48.48	6	82.10
7	Audrey Carle / Gabriel Farand	129.75	4	48.96	7	80.79
8	Camille Perreault / William St-Louis	121.92	10	42.63	8	79.29
9	Cassandra Leung / Paxton Fletcher	116.30	12	41.69	9	74.61
10	Mackenzie Ripley / Owen Brawley	111.50	11	42.39	10	69.11
11	Shallen Bear / Marty Haubrich	106.94	8	46.12	11	60.82
WD	Émy Carignan / Bryan Pierro	withdrew	7	46.30	withdrew from competition	

=== Ice dance ===
Rank	Name	Total points	RD		FD	
1	Emmy Bronsard / Aissa Bouaraguia	166.69	1	65.93	2	100.76
2	Nadiia Bashynska / Peter Beaumont	165.57	2	63.73	1	101.84
3	Olivia McIsaac / Corey Circelli	146.73	4	56.92	3	89.81
4	Jessica-Lee Behiel / Jackson Behiel	144.00	5	55.89	4	88.11
5	Hannah Lim / Ye Quan	143.06	3	58.63	6	84.43
6	Lily Hensen / Nathan Lickers	139.87	8	52.22	5	87.65
7	Amelia Boone / Malcolm Kowan	133.69	7	52.56	10	81.13
8	Sophia Kagolovskaya / Kieran MacDonald	131.60	6	52.67	11	78.93
9	Olivia Tremblay / Émile Couture	130.88	9	49.00	8	81.88
10	Jessica Li / Jacob Richmond	130.86	12	47.16	7	83.70
11	Isabel McQuilkin / Jacob Portz	126.54	13	45.22	9	81.32
12	Sydney Embro / Eric Millar	118.32	11	48.03	12	70.29
13	Chaima Ben Khelifa / Everest Zhu	116.77	10	48.24	14	68.53
14	Maia Iannetta / Liam Carr	112.40	15	43.65	13	68.75
15	Shaelene Katrayan / Jordan Derochie	108.78	14	44.28	15	64.50

== International team selections ==
=== World Championships ===
The 2020 World Figure Skating Championships will be held in Montreal, Quebec, Canada from March 16–22, 2020. Skate Canada announced some assignments on January 19, 2020. The teams were updated on February 13, 2020 and finalized on February 24, 2020.

	Men	Ladies	Pairs	Ice dance
1	Nam Nguyen	Emily Bausback	Kirsten Moore-Towers / Michael Marinaro	Piper Gilles / Paul Poirier
2		Alicia Pineault	Evelyn Walsh / Trennt Michaud	Marjorie Lajoie / Zachary Lagha
3				~~Laurence Fournier Beaudry / Nikolaj Sørensen~~ (withdrew)
1st alt.	Roman Sadovsky	Alison Schumacher	Liubov Ilyushechkina / Charlie Bilodeau	Carolane Soucisse / Shane Firus (called up)
2nd alt.	Keegan Messing	Madeline Schizas		

=== Four Continents Championships ===
The 2020 Four Continents Figure Skating Championships will be held in Seoul, South Korea from February 4–9, 2020. Skate Canada announced the assignments on January 19, 2020.

	Men	Ladies	Pairs	Ice dance
1	Roman Sadovsky	Emily Bausback	Kirsten Moore-Towers / Michael Marinaro	Piper Gilles / Paul Poirier
2	Nam Nguyen	Alison Schumacher	Evelyn Walsh / Trennt Michaud	Marjorie Lajoie / Zachary Lagha
3	Keegan Messing	Alicia Pineault	Liubov Ilyushechkina / Charlie Bilodeau	Carolane Soucisse / Shane Firus
1st alt.	Nicolas Nadeau	Véronik Mallet	Justine Brasseur / Mark Bardei	Haley Sales / Nikolas Wamsteeker
2nd alt.	Conrad Orzel	Gabrielle Daleman	Lori-Ann Matte / Thierry Ferland	Molly Lanaghan / Dmitre Razgulajevs
3rd alt.		Hannah Dawson	Nadine Wang / Francis Boudreau-Audet	Alicia Fabbri / Paul Ayer

=== World Junior Championships ===
Commonly referred to as "Junior Worlds", the 2020 World Junior Figure Skating Championships will take place in Tallinn, Estonia from March 2–8, 2020. Skate Canada announced some assignments on January 19, 2020. The teams were updated on February 13, 2020 and finalized on February 24, 2020.

	Men	Ladies	Pairs	Ice dance
1	Stephen Gogolev	Kaiya Ruiter	Patricia Andrew / Zachary Daleman	Natalie D'Alessandro / Bruce Waddell
2	Joseph Phan	Alison Schumacher	Kelly-Ann Laurin / Loucas Éthier	Emmy Bronsard / Aissa Bouaraguia
3				Miku Makita / Tyler Gunara
1st alt.	Aleksa Rakic	Emily Bausback	Gabrielle Levesque / Pier-Alexandre Hudon	Nadiia Bashynska / Peter Beaumont
2nd alt.	Corey Circelli	Madeline Schizas		Sofia Kagolovskaya / Kieran MacDonald

=== Winter Youth Olympics ===
The 2020 Winter Youth Olympics were held in Lausanne, Switzerland from January 10–15, 2020. The Canadian Championships were held after the Winter Youth Olympics.

	Men	Ladies	Pairs	Ice dance
1	Aleksa Rakic	Catherine Carle	Brooke McIntosh / Brandon Toste	Natalie D'Alessandro / Bruce Waddell
2				Miku Makita / Tyler Gunara
