= Alicia Pineault =

Canadian figure skater

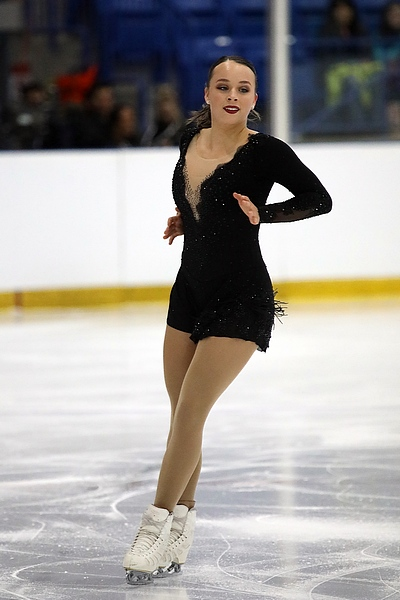
- Pineault at the 2018 CS Autumn Classic

Personal information
- Born: July 26, 1999 (age 27) Montreal, Quebec, Canada
- Home town: Varennes, Quebec
- Height: 1.60 m (5 ft 3 in)

Figure skating career
- Country: Canada
- Coach: Stéphane Yvars
- Skating club: SC Varennes
- Began skating: 2003

Alicia Pineault (French pronunciation: [pi.no]; born July 26, 1999) is a Canadian figure skater. She is the 2016 Canadian national junior silver medalist and has represented Canada at two Four Continents Championships, finishing within the top ten in 2020. She has also competed on the Grand Prix series.

== Personal life ==
Pineault was born on July 26, 1999, in Montreal. She studied at École Secondaire de Mortagne before enrolling at Cégep Édouard-Montpetit.

== Career ==
=== Early career ===
Pineault began learning to skate in 2003. Coached by Stéphane Yvars and Françoise Parisé in Boucherville, she won silver in the novice ladies' category at the 2015 Canadian Championships and silver in the junior ranks at the 2016 Canadian Championships.

In September 2016, Pineault appeared at the ISU Junior Grand Prix in the Czech Republic, finishing tenth. Competing on the senior level, she placed seventh at the 2017 Canadian Championships.

=== 2017–2018 season ===
Making her international senior debut, Pineault placed sixth at the 2017 CS U.S. Classic in September. In January, she finished eighth at the 2018 Canadian Championships and was selected to compete at the 2018 Four Continents Championships in Taipei; she placed fourteenth in the short program, twelfth in the free skate, and thirteenth overall in Taiwan.

=== 2018–2019 season ===
Pineault finished sixth at the 2018 CS Autumn Classic International. In October, she was invited to compete at her first Grand Prix event, the 2018 Skate Canada International, following the withdrawals of Gabrielle Daleman and Larkyn Austman. Pineault had to withdraw from the 2019 Canadian Championships after spraining her ankle in two places in the practice sessions.

=== 2019–2020 season ===
Pineault placed seventh at the 2019 CS U.S. Classic at the beginning of the season. Competing at Skate Canada International for the second consecutive season, she was eleventh of twelve skaters.

Pineault placed first in the short program at the 2020 Canadian Championships despite having an underrotation called on the second part of her jump combination. She had more difficulty in the free skate, landing only two triple jumps cleanly, and dropped to fourth place overall. Because national champion Emily Bausback lacked the senior technical minimum for the short program to be assigned to the 2020 World Championships, Skate Canada deferred making a decision about assigning its two berths there until after the 2020 Four Continents Championships in Seoul. As national bronze medalist Madeline Schizas was ineligible for international senior competitions, Pineault was assigned to Four Continents along with Bausback and silver medalist Alison Schumacher.

At the Four Continents, Pineault placed tenth with personal best results in both the free skate and total score. She was the highest-ranking Canadian woman at the event, besting Schumacher (in fourteenth place) by almost 23 points. After Pineault's result at Four Continents, she was assigned to compete at the 2020 World Championships, The championships were subsequently cancelled as a result of the coronavirus pandemic.

=== 2020–2021 season ===
Due to the COVID-19 pandemic, Grand Prix assignments were made based on training location, and Pineault was assigned to 2020 Skate Canada International. After the event was cancelled, she announced that due to ongoing uncertainties surrounding the season, she would not compete the rest of the season. Pineault instead took the time to follow doctors' recommendations to "tune some physiological aspects" and recover from injuries.

=== 2021–2022 season ===
Returning to competition, Pineault was fifth at the 2021 Skate Canada Challenge and then finished seventh at the 2022 Canadian Championships.

== Programs ==
Season	Short program	Free skating
2020–2021	Faded by Alan Walker	Awakening; Girl in the Mirror by Jennifer Thomas
2019–2020	Back to Black by Amy Winehouse	Woman by Shawn Phillips
2018–2019	Back to Black by Amy Winehouse	Woman by Shawn Phillips
2017–2018	Back to Black by Amy Winehouse	Mon cœur s'ouvre à ta voix (from Samson and Delilah) by Camille Saint-Saëns
2016–2017	Fallin' by Alicia Keys	Mon cœur s'ouvre à ta voix (from Samson and Delilah) by Camille Saint-Saëns

== Competitive highlights ==
GP: Grand Prix; CS: Challenger Series; JGP: Junior Grand Prix

International
Event	15–16	16–17	17–18	18–19	19–20	21–22
World Championships					C	
Four Continents			13th		10th	
GP Skate Canada				10th	11th	
CS Autumn Classic				6th		
CS U.S. Classic			6th		7th	
International: Junior
JGP Czech Republic		10th				
Autumn Classic	2nd	5th				
National
Canadian Champ.	2nd J	7th	8th	WD	4th	7th
