= Véronik Mallet =

Canadian figure skater

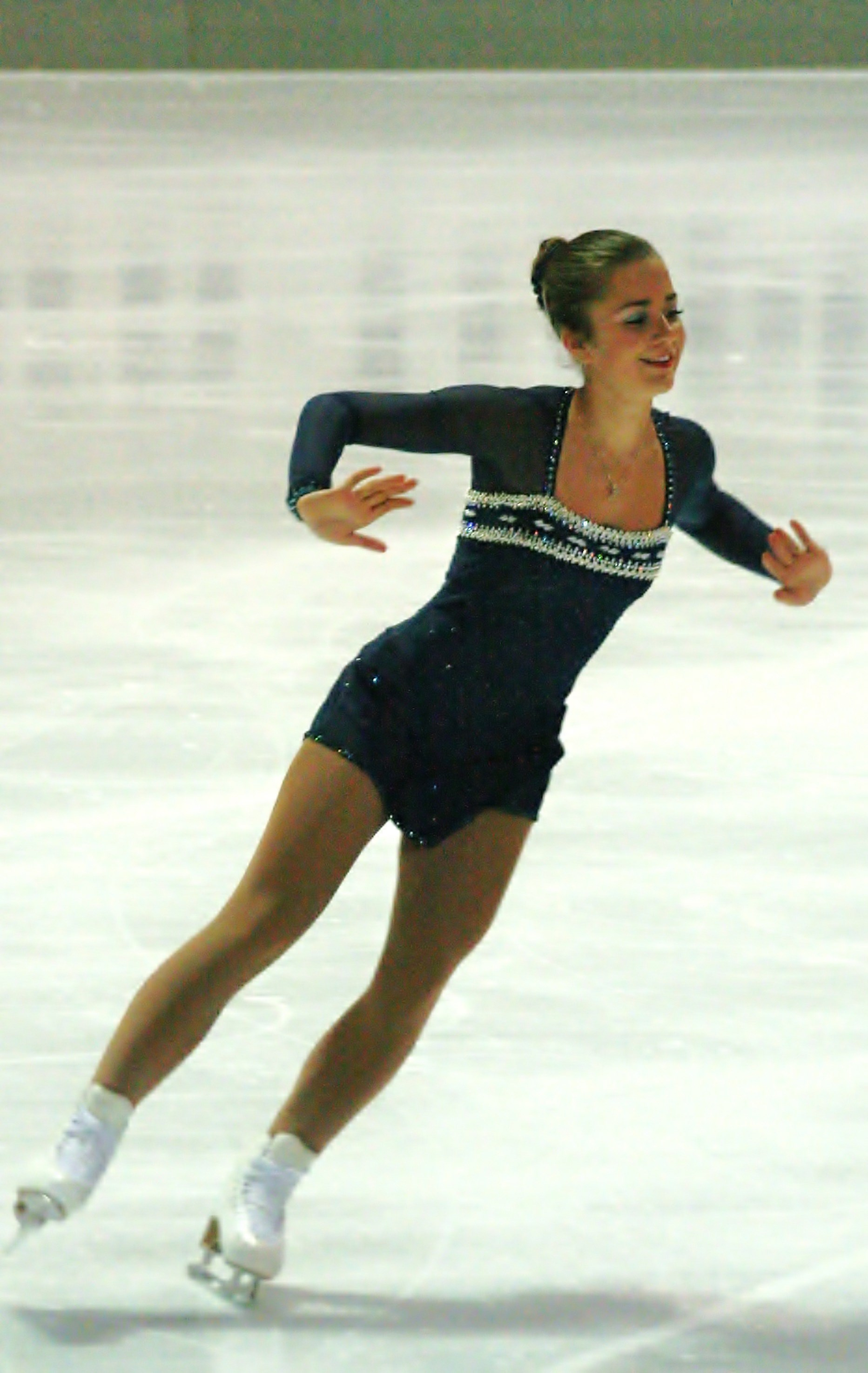
- Véronik Mallet at the 2013 Nebelhorn Trophy

Personal information
- Born: June 11, 1994 (age 32) Sept-Îles, Quebec, Canada
- Height: 1.61 m (5 ft 3 1/2 in)

Figure skating career
- Country: Canada
- Discipline: Women's singles
- Began skating: 1997
- Retired: 2022

Medal record
Canadian Championships
Silver medal – second place	2022 Ottawa	Singles
Bronze medal – third place	2015 Kingston	Singles
Bronze medal – third place	2019 Saint John	Singles

Véronik Mallet (born June 11, 1994) is a retired Canadian figure skater. She is the 2022 Canadian national silver medalist, a two-time Canadian national bronze medalist (2015, 2019) and has finished in the top 10 at Four Continents Championships 2019.

== Personal life ==
Véronik Mallet was born on June 11, 1994, in Sept-Îles, Quebec. After attending a CEGEP in Sorel-Tracy, she enrolled at Université du Québec à Montréal.

== Career ==
=== Early years ===
Mallet started skating in 1997. As a child, she trained in Sept-Îles, Quebec. Around 2008, she began traveling to Contrecœur, Quebec, to train under Annie Barabé. She won the junior silver medal at the 2012 Canadian Championships and placed fifth on the senior level in 2013.

=== 2013–2014 season ===
Mallet debuted internationally at the start of the 2013–2014 season, placing fourth at the 2013 Nebelhorn Trophy and eighth at her first Grand Prix (GP) event, the 2013 Skate Canada International. She finished fourth at the 2014 Canadian Championships and 13th at the 2014 Four Continents Championships.

=== 2014–2015 season ===
Mallet began her season on the Challenger Series (CS), placing seventh at the 2014 Nebelhorn Trophy, and then finished tenth at two Grand Prix events, the 2014 Skate Canada International and 2014 Trophée Éric Bompard. After winning the bronze medal at the 2015 Canadian Championships, Mallet was selected to compete at the 2015 Four Continents Championships. She placed thirteenth in the short program, fourteenth in the free skate, and fourteenth overall.

=== 2015–2016 season ===
In 2015–2016, Mallet placed ninth at the 2015 U.S. International Classic (CS), tenth at the 2015 Skate Canada International (GP), and fourth at the 2016 Canadian Championships. She was invited to replace Gabrielle Daleman at the 2016 Four Continents Championships in Taipei.

=== 2016–2017 season ===
Mallet injured her foot in October 2016. She withdrew from the 2016 Skate Canada International and missed two seasons.

=== 2018–2019 season ===
Mallet returned to competition at the 2018 CS Finlandia Trophy, where she placed sixth, following a seventh-place finish in the short program and a fifth-place free skate. She remarked: "It feels good to get back into international competition. I felt good about both programs, I was confident and that really helped." Following the withdrawal of Gabrielle Daleman and Larkyn Austman for health reasons, Mallet was assigned to the 2018 Skate Canada International. She in turn had to withdraw due to an aggravation of her right foot fracture.

Mallet returned to competition at the 2019 Canadian Championships. She placed third in the short program, skating cleanly. Despite errors in the free skate, she finished third there as well, winning her second national bronze medal. She stated that she hoped to reintroduce the flip and Lutz jumps into competition in future seasons. She was assigned to compete at the 2019 Four Continents Championships, where she finished ninth, a personal best and the highest finish among the three Canadian ladies competing there.

=== 2019–2020 season ===
Beginning the season at the 2019 CS Autumn Classic International, Mallet placed twelfth after struggles in both programs. Mallet began attempting the triple flip in competition again for the first time post-injury, and at her Grand Prix event, the 2019 Skate America, she first landed it in the short program successfully. She finished tenth overall, underrotating one jump in the free skate. Immediately afterward, Mallet was invited to compete at the 2019 Skate Canada International the following week, after Aurora Cotop withdrew. Mallet placed twelfth.

Following the Grand Prix, Mallet moved to train in Oakville under Bruno Marcotte. She went on to place seventh at the 2020 Canadian Championships.

=== 2020–2021 season ===
Due to the COVID-19 pandemic, the only competitions available were virtually-judged domestic ones. Mallet placed sixth at the 2021 Skate Canada Challenge.

=== 2021–2022 season ===
After taking the bronze medal at the 2022 Skate Canada Challenge, Mallet won the silver medal at the 2022 Canadian Championships, held without an audience in Ottawa due to the pandemic. Mallet said that it "was not perfect but I did what I could and I was really ready and looking forward to it and I am really glad with my performance." She finished thirteenth at the 2022 Four Continents Championships in Tallinn.

On July 7, Skate Canada announced her retirement from competitive figure skating.

== Programs ==
Season	Short program	Free skating	Exhibition
2019–2020	True Colors by Cyndi Lauper	Flashlight by Jessie J	
2018–2019	True Colors by Cyndi Lauper	Turning Tables by Adele; Let Me Go by Karl Hugo	
2017–2018		Turning Tables by Adele; Let Me Go by Karl Hugo	
2016–2017	It's Magic by Doris Day	Turning Tables by Adele; Let Me Go by Karl Hugo	
2015–2016	Waltz No. 7 by Frédéric Chopin choreo. by David Wilson	Violin Concerto in E minor, Op. 64 Allegro molto appassionato by Felix Mendelssohn choreo. by David Wilson	
2014–2015	Waltz No. 7 by Frédéric Chopin choreo. by David Wilson	Funny Girl by Jule Styne	Diamonds by Rihanna
2013–2014	Papillon by Rolf Løvland, Secret Garden	Funny Girl by Jule Styne	Car Wash by Christina Aguilera, Missy Elliott
2010–2011	Lullaby by Angèle DUbeau		
2009–2010		Masquerade by Aram Khachaturian	

== Competitive highlights ==
GP: Grand Prix; CS: Challenger Series

International
Event	11–12	12–13	13–14	14–15	15–16	16–17	18–19	19–20	20–21	21–22
Four Continents			13th	14th	14th		9th			13th
GP France				10th						
GP Skate America								10th		
GP Skate Canada			8th	10th	10th	WD	WD	12th		
CS Autumn Classic								12th		
CS Finlandia							6th			
CS Nebelhorn				7th						
CS U.S. Classic					9th					
Nebelhorn Trophy			4th							
National
Canadian Champ.	2nd J	5th	4th	3rd	4th		3rd	7th	C	2nd
SC Challenge			3rd		2nd				6th	3rd
