= Emily Bausback =

Canadian figure skater

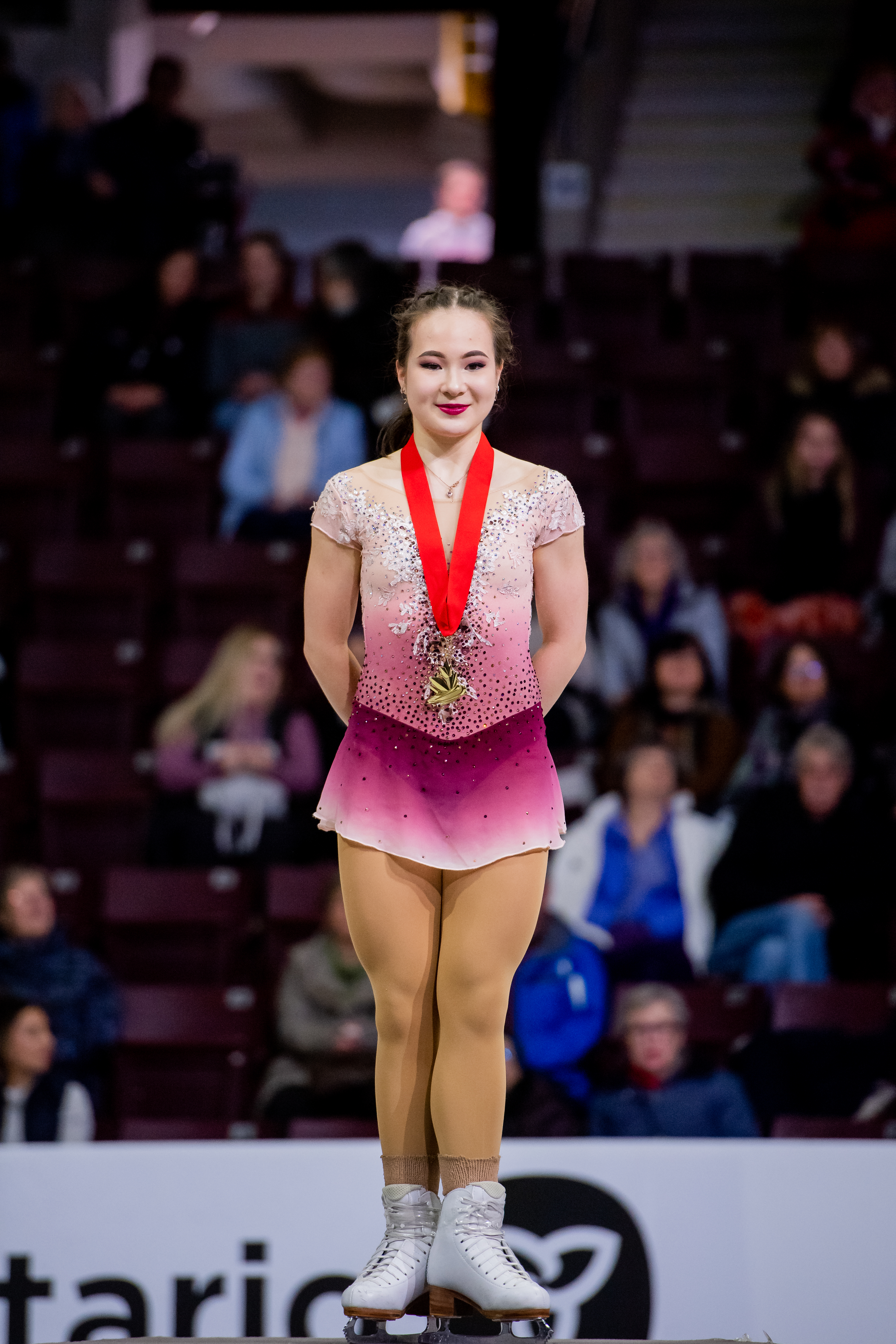
- Emily Bausback at the 2020 Canadian Championships

Personal information
- Born: July 24, 2002 (age 24) Vancouver, British Columbia, Canada
- Height: 1.55 m (5 ft 1 in)

Figure skating career
- Country: Canada
- Discipline: Women's singles
- Began skating: 2005
- Retired: January 14, 2022

Medal record
Canadian Championships
Gold medal – first place	2020 Mississauga	Singles

Emily Bausback (born July 24, 2002) is a Canadian retired figure skater. She is the 2020 Canadian national champion.

== Career ==
Bausback began learning to skate in 2005. She trains at the Champs International Skating Centre of BC at Scotia Barn in Burnaby, British Columbia, coached by Joanne McLeod. Bausback debuted on the ISU Junior Grand Prix series in September 2016.

=== 2019–20 season ===
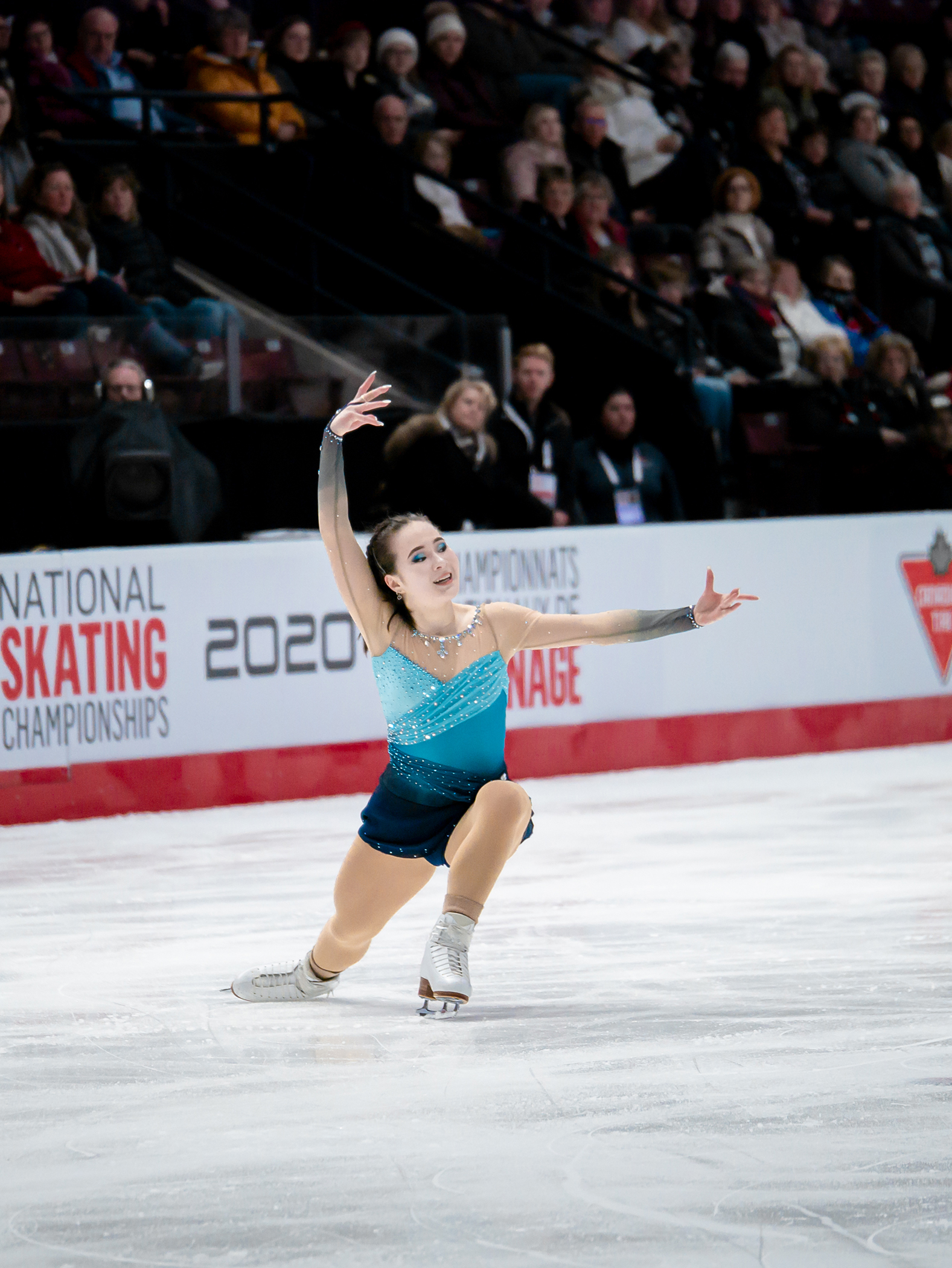
Bausback at the 2020 Canadian Championships

Commencing her fourth season on the Junior Grand Prix, Bausback placed sixth at JGP United States in Lake Placid. Selected afterward to make her senior international debut on the Challenger series, she was sixth at the 2019 CS Warsaw Cup. Bausback's result in Poland initially earned her the season's required technical minimum scores necessary to attend ISU championship events; however, a subsequent midseason amendment by the ISU meant that she lacked the short program minimum.

Competing as a senior domestically, Bausback ranked fourth in the short program at the 2020 Canadian Championships. She then won the free skate to take the gold medal, scoring ahead of silver medalist Alison Schumacher by 6.60 points. Speaking afterward, she called it "the best feeling I have ever had." Bausback was the first national ladies' champion from British Columbia since Karen Magnussen's fifth victory in 1973.

Due to Bausback lacking the senior international technical minimum in the short program, she could not be immediately assigned to one of Canada's two ladies' berths at the 2020 World Championships. She was instead assigned, along with Schumacher and fourth-place Alicia Pineault, to compete at the 2020 Four Continents Championships in Seoul. Bausback placed fifteenth at Four Continents, and came up short of the short program minimum. Skate Canada gave Bausback a second chance at the International Challenge Cup in The Hague, where she succeeded in gaining the minimum score. Correspondingly, she was named to the World Championship team on February 22. However, the World Championships were subsequently cancelled as a result of the coronavirus pandemic.

=== 2020–21 season ===
After returning to training after the pandemic lockdowns, Bausback was off the ice for four weeks in the summer after breaking the second metatarsal bone in her right foot in training. Bausback was assigned to make her Grand Prix debut at the 2020 Skate Canada International, but the event was also cancelled as a result of the pandemic.

With the pandemic making hosting in-person events difficult, the 2021 Skate Canada Challenge, the main qualifying competition for the national championships, was held virtually with athletes submitting a pre-recorded Short & Free program from various locations throughout Canada over a 6-week period. Though winning the BC/YK Sectional Championships for the first time in her career a month earlier, Bausback, while being treated for a back injury sustained in a COVID-shortened training regimen, placed fifth in the short program, but dropped to tenth place in the free skate, finishing eighth overall. The 2021 Canadian Championships were subsequently cancelled.

Despite her Challenge placement, and after both a strong recovery from injury and showing through Skate Canada monitoring, on February 25, Basusback was announced as one of two Ladies entries to the 2021 Worlds, along with Madeline Schizas. At the World Championships, Bausback struggled with her jumps in the short program and did not qualify for the free skating, finishing twenty-seventh overall.

=== 2021–22 season ===
Bausback was assigned to begin the season at the 2021 CS Autumn Classic International, where she placed seventh, the highest ordinal among the three Canadian women at the event. She made her Grand Prix debut at the 2021 Skate Canada International, placing eleventh. She was second among the three Canadian women at the end, 26.68 behinds Madeline Schizas but 8.69 points ahead of Alison Schumacher. Bausback deemed the overall experience "amazing", despite it not being her best performance. She was later given a second Challenger assignment, finishing seventh at the 2021 CS Cup of Austria.

Bausback finished ninth at the 2022 Canadian Championships.

She later announced her retirement from competitive figure skating.

== Programs ==
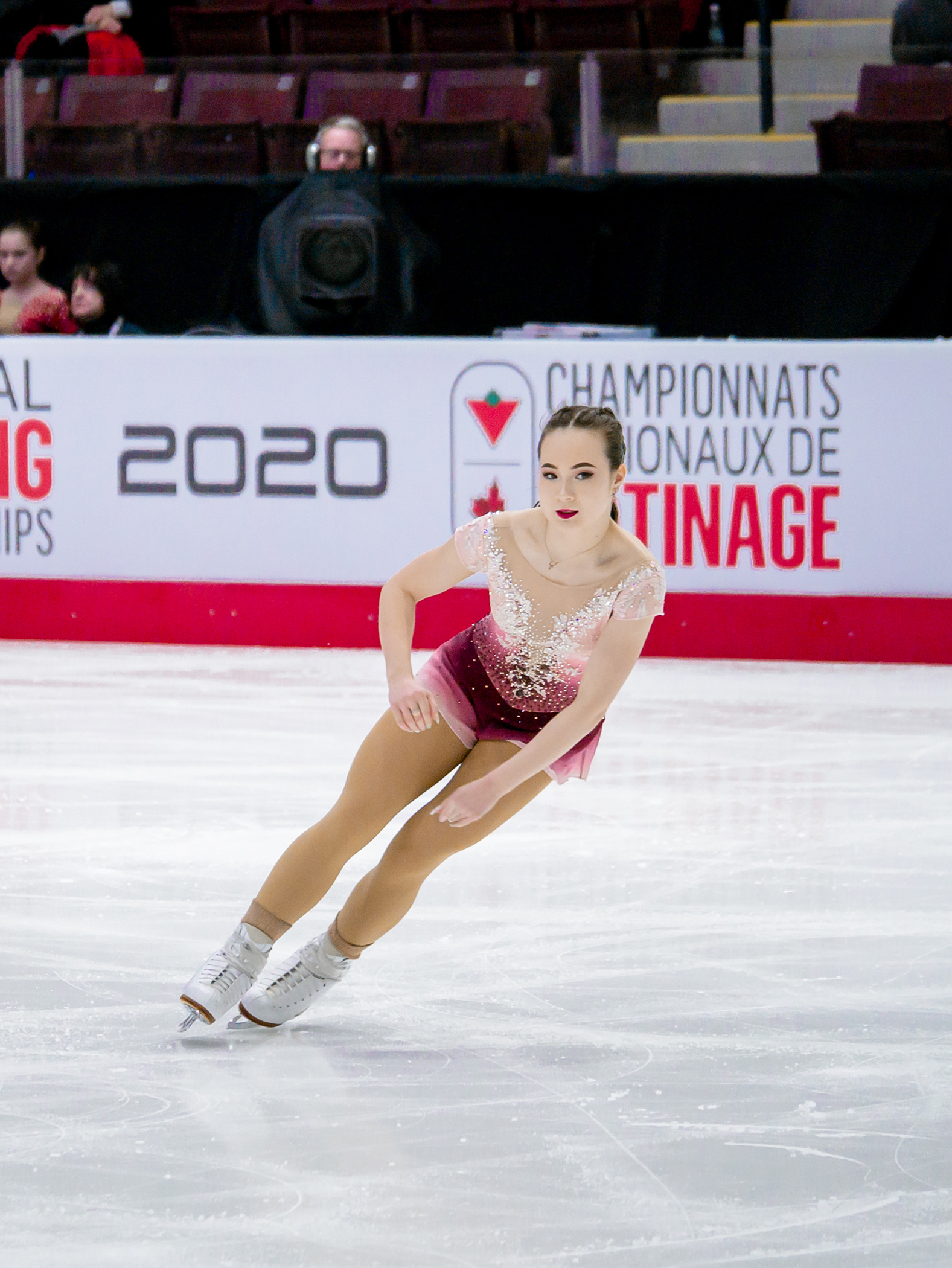
Bausback at the 2020 Canadian Championships

Season	Short program	Free skating
2020–2022	The One I Love by Ellen Krauss	Alla Notte (Adagio) performed by Miriam Stockley
2019–2020	Everywhere by Vapor RMW, Emily Patrick	My Heart Will Go On performed by Julia Westlin
2018–2019	I'm A-Doun For Lack O'Johnny (Scottish Fantasy) by Vanessa-Mae	Kung Fu Piano: Cello Ascends by The Piano Guys
2017–2018	Retour à la maison by Wojciech Kilar	Kung Fu Piano: Cello Ascends by The Piano Guys
2016–2017	Retour à la maison by Wojciech Kilar	Hip Hip Chin Chin by Club des Belugas; U Plavu Zoru by Pink Martini

== Competitive highlights ==
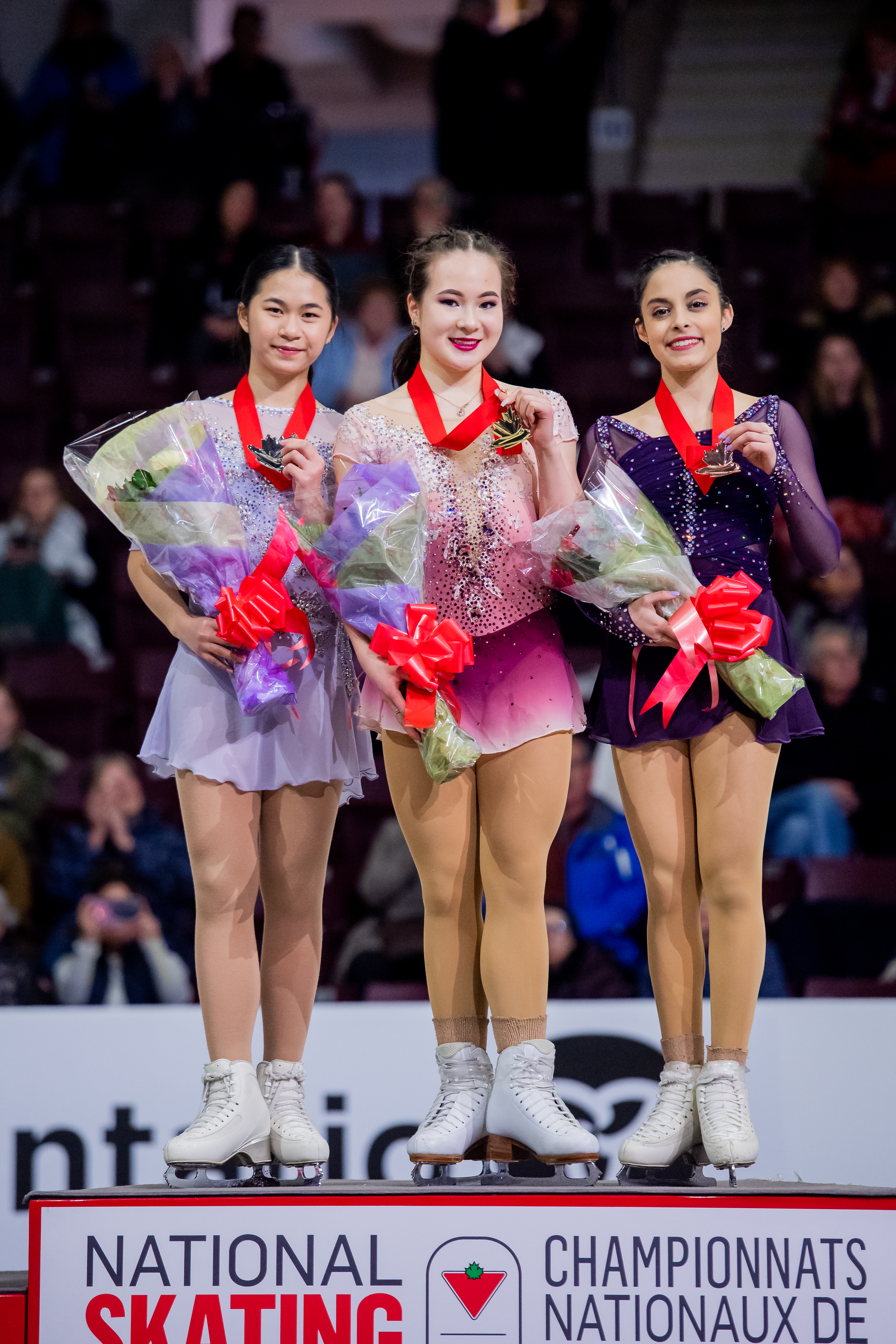
Bausback (center) with Alison Schumacher (left) and Madeline Schizas (right) at the 2020 Canadian Championships podium

International
Event	16–17	17–18	18–19	19–20	20–21	21–22
Worlds				C	27th	
Four Continents				15th		
GP Skate Canada						11th
CS Autumn Classic						7th
CS Cup of Austria						7th
CS Warsaw Cup				6th		
Challenge Cup				11th		
International: Junior
JGP Croatia		11th				
JGP Estonia	13th					
JGP Japan	10th					
JGP Lithuania			12th			
JGP U.S.				6th		
National
Canadian Champ.	2nd J		10th	1st		9th
Skate Canada Challenge	2nd J	5th	13th	5th	8th	

== Detailed results ==
=== Senior level ===
2021–2022 season
Date	Event	SP	FS	Total
January 6–12, 2022	2022 Canadian Championships	5; 56.82	11; 92.09	9; 148.91
November 11–14, 2021	2021 CS Cup of Austria	4; 55.06	11; 99.24	7; 154.30
October 29–31, 2021	2021 Skate Canada International	10; 59.53	11; 100.35	11; 159.88
September 16–18, 2021	2021 CS Autumn Classic International	9; 51.61	6; 97.71	7; 149.32
2020–2021 season
Date	Event	SP	FS	Total
March 22–28, 2021	2021 World Championships	27; 55.74	–	27; 55.74
January 8–17, 2021	2021 Skate Canada Challenge	5; 55.73	10; 93.65	8; 149.38
2019–2020 season
Date	Event	SP	FS	Total
February 20–23, 2020	2020 Challenge Cup	7; 58.26	14; 93.63	11; 151.89
February 4–9, 2020	2020 Four Continents Championships	14; 49.10	15; 98.13	15; 147.23
January 13–19, 2020	2020 Canadian Championships	4; 58.90	1; 116.64	1; 175.54
November 14–17, 2019	2019 CS Warsaw Cup	9; 55.29	6; 117.19	6; 172.48
2018–2019 season
Date	Event	SP	FS	Total
January 13–20, 2019	2019 Canadian Championships	10; 54.61	10; 91.82	10; 146.43

=== Junior level ===
2019–2020 season
Date	Event	SP	FS	Total
August 28–31, 2019	2019 JGP United States	5; 55.71	6; 102.51	6; 158.22
2018–2019 season
Date	Event	SP	FS	Total
September 5–8, 2018	2018 JGP Lithuania	17; 39.52	10; 90.08	12; 129.60
2017–2018 season
Date	Event	SP	FS	Total
September 27–30, 2017	2017 JGP Croatia	9; 46.96	10; 86.42	11; 133.38
2016–2017 season
Date	Event	SP	FS	Total
January 16–22, 2017	2017 Canadian Junior Championships	2; 53.62	3; 97.90	2; 151.52
Sept. 28 – Oct. 1, 2016	2016 JGP Estonia	19; 36.15	10; 80.80	13; 116.95
September 8–11, 2016	2016 JGP Japan	13; 40.64	8; 81.52	10; 122.16
