= Alison Schumacher =

Canadian figure skater (born 2002)

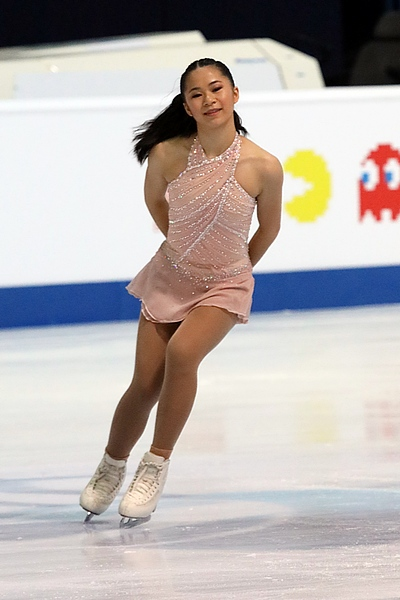
- Schumacher at the 2019 World Junior Championships

Personal information
- Born: 22 November 2002 (age 23) Zhuzhou, China
- Home town: Tecumseh, Ontario, Canada
- Height: 1.52 m (5 ft 0 in)

Figure skating career
- Country: Canada
- Coach: Joey Russell
- Skating club: Riverside SC; Toronto Cricket, Skating and Curling Club
- Began skating: 2007

Alison Schumacher (born 22 November 2002) is a Canadian figure skater who competes in women's singles. She is the 2020 Canadian national silver medallist. She has represented Canada at four ISU Championships, finishing within the top ten at two World Junior Championships (2019, 2020).

== Early life ==
Alison Schumacher was born in Zhuzhou, China on 22 November 2002. She later moved to Tecumseh, Ontario. She began skating in 2007. At age 5, she went to Riverside Skating Club.

== Skating career ==
At age 9, Schumacher competed in her first international competition, Skate Detroit, where she finished in fourth place. By age 11, Schumacher was the youngest solo skater at Skate Canada Development Camp.

In the 2017–18 season, she competed in both junior ladies singles and junior pairs with Zachary Daleman. At the 2018 Canadian Championships, she placed fifth in the junior ladies' event and eighth in junior pairs.

=== 2018–19 season ===
Schumacher began the season competing on the Junior Grand Prix, finishing ninth at JGP Slovakia, before finishing twelfth at JGP Canada. In November 2018, Schumacher won gold at the Skate Ontario Sectionals, securing a place at the 2019 Canadian Championships as a senior competitor domestically. There, she placed fourth in the short program with a score of 60.10 and finished seventh overall.

Canada named Schumacher to its team for the 2019 World Junior Championships, where she finished in tenth place.

=== 2019–20 season ===
Given two assignments on the Junior Grand Prix, Schumacher placed eighteenth at JGP France and then seventh at JGP Croatia. Sent afterward to make her international senior debut on the Challenger series, Schumacher placed eighth at the 2019 CS Warsaw Cup.

A podium contender at the 2020 Canadian Championships, Schumacher placed sixth in the short program after falling on her attempted triple flip-triple toe loop combination. She placed second in the free skate, rising to the silver medal position overall. With national champion Emily Bausback lacking the technical minimum scores necessary to compete at the 2020 World Championships, Skate Canada deferred on making ladies' assignments for that event, and assigned Schumacher, Bausback and fourth-place Alicia Pineault to compete at the 2020 Four Continents Championships in Seoul. She placed fourteenth at Four Continents, finishing ahead of Bausback but four places and nearly 23 points behind Pineault.

Schumacher finished the season at the 2020 World Junior Championships, where she placed ninth, setting new personal bests in both segments and overall.

=== 2020–21 season ===
Schumacher was assigned to make her Grand Prix debut at the 2020 Skate Canada International, but the event was cancelled as a result of the coronavirus pandemic.

With Skate Canada holding its domestic competitions virtually, Schumacher placed fifth at the Ontario Sectionals before winning the silver medal at the 2021 Skate Canada Challenge. These results would have qualified her to the 2021 Canadian Championships, but they were deemed infeasible during the pandemic and cancelled.

Schumacher was named as an alternate to the 2021 World Championships, the two ladies' berths going to Madeline Schizas and Emily Bausback. With Canada's mandatory two-week quarantine for returning athletes, however, no member of the World team was assigned to the 2021 World Team Trophy, and Schumacher was assigned as one of Canada's two ladies' entries, alongside Gabrielle Daleman. Schumacher placed ninth in the short program and eighth in the free skate, while Team Canada finished in sixth place.

=== 2021–22 season ===
Schumacher began the season at the 2021 CS Autumn Classic International, where she placed tenth out of eleven competitors and third of the three Canadian women competing at the event. She then made her Grand Prix debut at the 2021 Skate Canada International, finishing twelfth out of twelve skaters. She remarked afterwards, "I'm struggling with nerves and tightness when I feel the pressure." Given a second Challenger assignment, she was thirteenth at the 2021 CS Cup of Austria.

At the 2022 Canadian Championships, Schumacher placed sixth in the short program and ninth in the free skate but finished in fifth place overall. Reflecting on difficulties with some of the jumps in her free skate, she said afterwards, "in the middle, I had to fight, but I am happy. It could have gone worse. Overall, I am happy with the fight." Schumacher was assigned to the 2022 Four Continents Championships in Tallinn, where she came eleventh.

== Programs ==
Season	Short program	Free skating
2022–2023	Somewhere in Time by John Barry choreo. by Jeffrey Buttle	Once Upon a Time in the West by Ennio Morricone choreo. by Joey Russell
2021–2022	Somewhere in Time by John Barry choreo. by Jeffrey Buttle	Eleanor Rigby by The Beatles performed by Joshua Bell & Frankie Moreno choreo. by Joey Russell
2020–2021	Clair de Lune by Claude Debussy choreo. by Joey Russell	Once Upon a Time in the West by Ennio Morricone choreo. by Joey Russell
2019–2020	Clair de Lune by Claude Debussy choreo. by Joey Russell	With You; Unchained Melody (Dance)/The Love Inside (from Ghost: The Musical) choreo. by Jeffrey Buttle
2018–2019	I Want to Hold Your Hand by The Beatles choreo. by Joey Russell	Entrance of Butterfly; Un bel di vedizemo (from Madama Butterfly) by Giacomo Puccini choreo. by Joey Russell
2017–2018	I Want to Hold Your Hand by The Beatles choreo. by Joey Russell	Fascination by Fermo Dante Marchetti performed by André Rieu choreo. by Joey Russell

== Competitive highlights ==
GP: Grand Prix; CS: Challenger Series; JGP: Junior Grand Prix

=== Women's singles ===
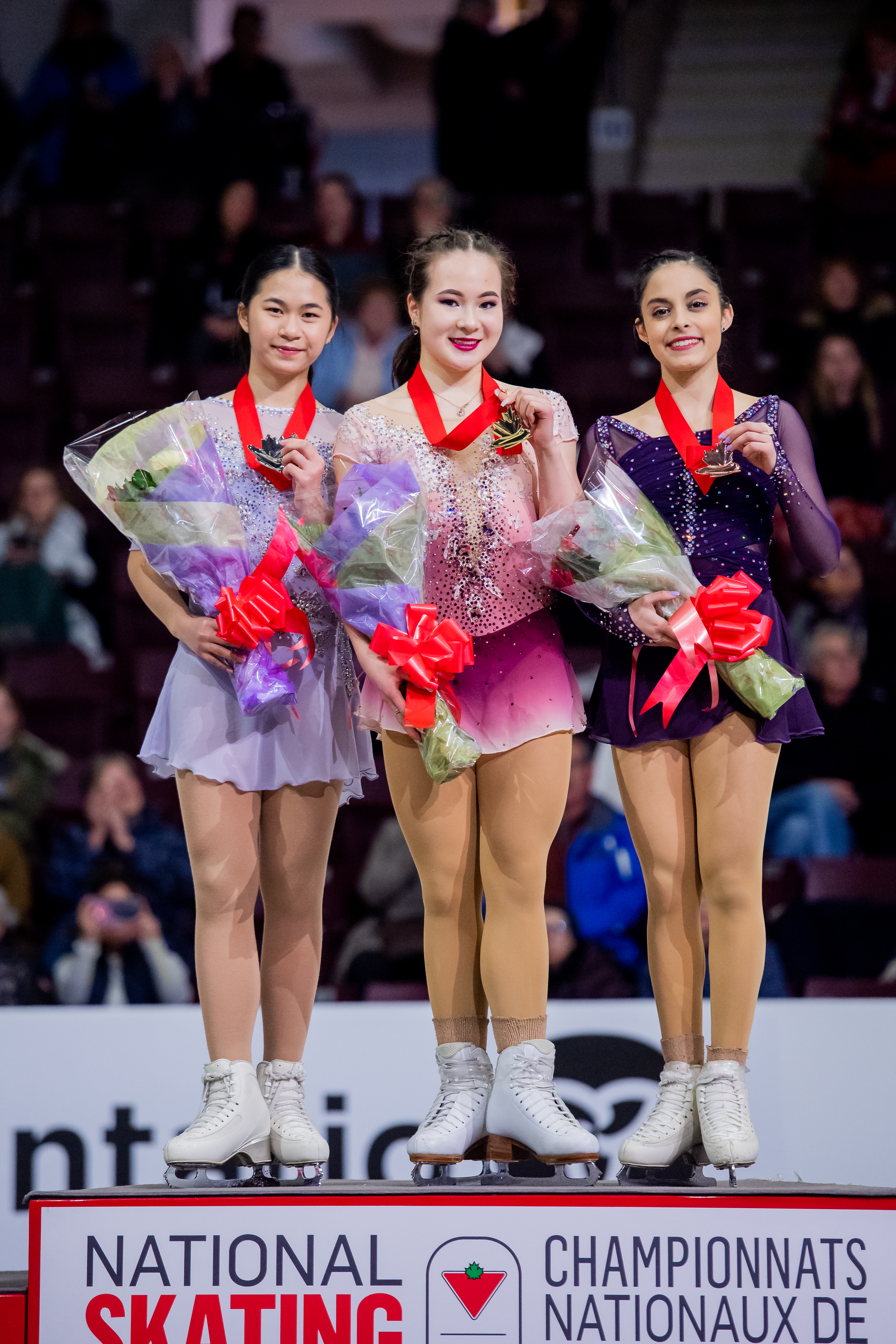
Schumacher (left) with Emily Bausback (center) and Madeline Schizas (right) at the 2020 Canadian Championships podium

International
Event	14–15	15–16	16–17	17–18	18–19	19–20	20–21	21–22	22–23
Four Continents						14th		11th	
GP Skate Canada							C	12th	WD
CS Autumn Classic								10th	
CS Cup of Austria								13th	
CS Warsaw Cup						8th			
Cranberry Cup									7th
International: Junior
Junior Worlds					10th	9th			
JGP Canada					12th				
JGP Croatia						7th			
JGP France						18th			
JGP Italy				8th					
JGP Latvia				9th					
JGP Slovakia					9th				
National
Canadian Champ.			3rd J	5th J	7th	2nd	C	5th	
SC Challenge	7th N	7th N	6th J	1st J	2nd	11th	2nd	10th	
Ontario Sectionals				1st J	1st		5th		
Team Events
World Team Trophy							6th T 8th P		
TBD = Assigned; WD = Withdrew; C = Event cancelled Levels: J = Junior; T = Team result; P = Personal result. Medals Awarded for team result only

=== Pairs with Daleman ===
National
Event	17–18
Canadian Champ.	8th J
SC Challenge	9th J
Ontario Sectionals	5th J
Levels: J = Junior

== Detailed results ==
Small medals for short and free programs awarded only at ISU Championships.

=== Senior results ===
2022–2023 season
Date	Event	SP	FS	Total
August 9–14, 2022	2022 Cranberry Cup International	6; 52.75	12; 84.50	7; 137.25
2021–2022 season
Date	Event	SP	FS	Total
January 18–23, 2022	2022 Four Continents Championships	11; 57.36	10; 111.06	11; 168.42
January 6–12, 2022	2022 Canadian Championships	6; 56.38	9; 102.98	5; 159.36
November 11–14, 2021	2021 CS Cup of Austria	17; 46.68	8; 100.46	13; 147.14
October 29–31, 2021	2021 Skate Canada International	11; 55.47	12; 95.72	12; 151.19
September 16–18, 2021	2021 CS Autumn Classic International	10; 47.51	10; 79.55	10; 127.06
2020–2021 season
Date	Event	SP	FS	Total
15–18 April 2021	2021 World Team Trophy	9; 59.19	8; 111.98	6T/8P; 171.17
8–17 January 2021	2021 Skate Canada Challenge	2; 60.52	3; 107.60	2; 168.12
2019–2020 season
Date	Event	SP	FS	Total
4–9 February 2020	2020 Four Continents Championships	18; 42.55	12; 108.18	14; 150.73
13–19 January 2020	2020 Canadian Championships	6; 55.95	2; 112.99	2; 168.94
14–17 November 2019	2019 Warsaw Cup	5; 56.78	8; 113.20	8; 169.98
2018–2019 season
Date	Event	SP	FS	Total
13–20 January 2019	2019 Canadian Championships	4; 60.10	7; 97.63	7; 157.73

=== Junior results ===
2019–2020 season
Date	Event	SP	FS	Total
2–8 March 2020	2020 World Junior Championships	11; 59.99	9; 114.03	9; 174.02
25–28 September 2019	2019 JGP Croatia	8; 52.65	7; 99.61	7; 151.86
21–24 August 2019	2019 JGP France	16; 46.54	20; 83.51	18; 130.05
2018–2019 season
Date	Event	SP	FS	Total
4–10 March 2019	2019 World Junior Championships	16; 51.86	10; 106.16	10; 158.52
12–15 September 2018	2018 JGP Canada	14; 41.98	10; 88.16	12; 130.14
22–25 August 2018	2018 JGP Slovakia	8; 55.74	9; 88.42	9; 144.16
2017–2018 season
Date	Event	SP	FS	Total
8–14 January 2018	2018 Canadian Championships	3; 52.39	12; 79.56	5; 131.95
11–14 October 2017	2017 JGP Italy	8; 52.43	8; 96.33	8; 148.76
6–9 September 2017	2017 JGP Latvia	4; 55.64	11; 88.97	9; 144.61
