= 2019 Canadian Figure Skating Championships =

Figure skating competition

2019 Canadian Skating Championships
- Type: National Championship
- Date: January 13 – 20
- Season: 2018–19
- Location: Saint John, New Brunswick
- Host: Skate Canada
- Venue: Harbour Station

Champions
- Men's singles: Nam Nguyen (S); Aleksa Rakic (J)
- Ladies' singles: Alaine Chartrand (S); Hannah Dawson (J)
- Pairs: Kirsten Moore-Towers / Michael Marinaro (S); Chloe Choinard / Mathieu Ostiguy (J)
- Ice dance: Kaitlyn Weaver / Andrew Poje (S); Marjorie Lajoie / Zachary Lagha (J)
- Previous: 2018 Canadian Championships
- Next: 2020 Canadian Championships

The 2019 Canadian Tire National Skating Championships was held from January 13–20, 2019 in Saint John, New Brunswick. Organized by Skate Canada and sponsored by Canadian Tire, the event determined the national champions of Canada. Medals were awarded in the disciplines of men's singles, women's singles, pair skating, and ice dancing on the senior, junior, and novice levels. Although the official International Skating Union terminology for female skaters in the singles category is ladies, Skate Canada uses women officially. The results of this competition were among the selection criteria for the 2019 World Championships, the 2019 Four Continents Championships, and the 2019 World Junior Championships.

Saint John was named as the host in January 2018. Competitors qualified at the Skate Canada Challenge held in Edmonton, Alberta in December 2018.

This was Saint John's first time hosting this event. The city had previously hosted Skate Canada International three times (2013, 1999, and 1995). They also hosted the 1998 World Junior Championships in December 1997.

== Entries ==
The Skate Canada published the entry list on December 21, 2018.

Level	Men	Women	Pairs	Ice dancing
Senior (S)	Max Denk (ON); Zoé Duval-Yergeau (QC); Stephen Gogolev (ON); Laurent Guay (QC); Iliya Kovler (ON); Alexander Lawrence (BC/YK); Brian Le (BC/YK); Eric Liu (AB/NT/NU); Matthew Markell (ON); Keegan Messing (AB/NT/NU); Nicolas Nadeau (QC); Nam Nguyen (ON); Conrad Orzel (ON); Joseph Phan (QC); Roman Sadovsky (ON); Dustin Sherriff-Clayton (AB/NT/NU); Bennet Toman (ON); Samuel Turcotte (QC)	Larkyn Austman (BC/YK); Emily Bausback (BC/YK); Sarah-Maude Blanchard (QC); Helene Carle (ON); Alaine Chartrand (ON); Aurora Cotop (ON); Gabrielle Daleman (ON); Emy Decelles (QC); Aislinn Ganci (AB/NT/NU); Olivia Gran (BC/YK); Jane Gray (AB/NT/NU); Béatrice Lavoie-Léonard (QC); Michelle Long (ON); Véronik Mallet (QC); Madison Moore (AB/NT/NU); Alicia Pineault (QC); Alison Schumacher (ON); Sarah Tamura (BC/YK)	Camille Ruest / Andrew Wolfe (QC); Justine Brasseur / Mark Bardei (QC); Kirsten Moore-Towers / Michael Marinaro (ON); Mariah Mccaw / Steven Adcock (ON); Lori-Ann Matte / Thierry Ferland(QC); Evelyn Walsh / Trennt Michaud (ON)	Kaitlyn Weaver / Andrew Poje (ON); Molly Lanaghan / Dmitre Razgulajevs (ON); Gina Cipriano / Jake Richardson (QC); Laurence Fournier Beaudry / Nikolaj Sørensen (QC); Haley Sales / Nikolas Wamsteeker (BC/YK); Piper Gilles / Paul Poirier (ON); Elysia-Marie Campbell / Philippe Granger (QC); Carolane Soucisse / Shane Firus (QC)
Junior (J)	Gabriel Blumenthal (BC/YK); Brian Chiem (AB/NT/NU); Corey Circelli (ON); Beres Clements (BC/YK); Jack Dushenski (ON); Loucas Éthier (QC); Antoine Goyette (QC); Alec Guinzbourg (ON); Justin Hampole (BC/YK); Koen Kucher (SK); Alistair Lam (ON); Alexis Lay (QC); Hugo Li (ON); Dawson Nodwell (AB/NT/NU); Bryan Pierro (QC); Aleksa Rakic (BC/YK); Tristan Taylor (SK); Bruce Waddell (ON)	Élodie Adsuar (QC); Sandrine Bouchard (QC); Emma Bulawka (BC/YK); Daria Carr (BC/YK); Lititia Chen (BC/YK); Natalie D'Alessandro (ON); Hannah Dawson (ON); Haley Gillett (AB/NT/NU); Elizabeth Hatzis (QC); Leah Lee (BC/YK); Lissa Anne McGaghey (NB); Amelia Orzel (ON); Emmanuelle Proft (ON); Madeline Schizas (ON); Reagan Scott (ON); Rosalie Vincent (QC); Natalie Walker (ON); Lilika Zheng (ON)	Chloe Panetta / Benjamin Mimar (QC); Brooke McIntosh / Brandon Toste (ON); Camille Perreault / Bryan Pierro (QC); Olivia Boys-Eddy / Mackenzie Boys-Eddy (ON); Chloe Choinard / Mathieu Ostiguy (QC); Marin Ono / Matthew den Boer (AB/NT/NU); Patricia Andrew / Paxton Fletcher (ON); Gabrielle Levesque / Pier-Alexandre Hudon (QC); Giulianna Corsini / Zachary Daleman (ON)	Emmy Bronsard / Aissa Bouaraguia (QC); Natalie D'Alessandro / Bruce Waddell (ON); Olivia McIsaac / Corey Circelli (ON); Ashylnne Stairs / Elliott Graham (ON); Irina Galiyanova / Grayson Lochhead (ON); Jessica-Lee Behiel / Jackson Behiel (AB/NT/NU); Jessica Li / Jacob Richmond (QC); Sophia O'Brien-Doerksen / Kyle Pearson (AB/NT/NU); Yuka Orihara / Lee Royer (BC/YK); Alicia Fabbri / Paul Ayer (QC); Nadiia Bashynska / Peter Beaumont (ON); Ellie Fisher / Simon-Pierre Malette-Paquette (QC); Miku Makita / Tyler Gunara (BC/YK); Colleen Tordoff / Vladimir Tchernov (ON); Marjorie Lajoie / Zachary Lagha (QC)

== Medal summary ==
=== Senior ===
Discipline	Gold	Silver	Bronze
Men	Nam Nguyen	Stephen Gogolev	Keegan Messing
Women	Alaine Chartrand	Aurora Cotop	Véronik Mallet
Pairs	Kirsten Moore-Towers / Michael Marinaro	Evelyn Walsh / Trennt Michaud	Camille Ruest / Andrew Wolfe
Ice dance	Kaitlyn Weaver / Andrew Poje	Piper Gilles / Paul Poirier	Laurence Fournier Beaudry / Nikolaj Sørensen

=== Junior ===
Discipline	Gold	Silver	Bronze
Men	Aleksa Rakic	Beres Clements	Corey Circelli
Women	Hannah Dawson	Madeline Schizas	Reagan Scott
Pairs	Chloe Choinard / Mathieu Ostiguy	Brooke McIntosh / Brandon Toste	Gabrielle Levesque / Pier-Alexandre Hudon
Ice dancing	Marjorie Lajoie / Zachary Lagha	Alicia Fabbri / Paul Ayer	Natalie D'Alessandro / Bruce Waddell

== Senior results ==
=== Men ===
Rank	Name	Section	Total points	SP		FS	
1	Nam Nguyen	ON	258.01	3	85.73	1	172.28
2	Stephen Gogolev	ON	253.56	1	88.77	2	164.79
3	Keegan Messing	AB/NT/NU	247.44	2	87.18	3	160.26
4	Joseph Phan	QC	230.07	6	76.35	5	153.72
5	Conrad Orzel	ON	224.15	4	82.87	6	141.28
6	Nicolas Nadeau	QC	223.90	7	70.16	4	153.74
7	Roman Sadovsky	ON	218.71	5	82.10	7	136.61
8	Bennet Toman	ON	203.97	8	69.31	8	134.66
9	Iliya Kovler	ON	198.88	9	68.24	10	130.64
10	Alexander Lawrence	BC/YK	188.41	10	65.83	12	122.58
11	Eric Liu	AB/NWT/NU	187.29	13	60.33	11	126.96
12	Matthew Markell	ON	183.27	17	52.23	9	131.04
13	Laurent Guay	QC	171.52	11	62.60	14	108.92
14	Zoe Duval-Yergeau	QC	168.85	12	60.99	15	107.86
15	Max Denk	ON	167.44	15	57.29	13	110.15
16	Samuel Turcotte	QC	164.03	16	57.16	16	106.87
17	Dustin Sherriff-Clayton	AB/NWT/NU	158.65	14	58.63	17	100.02
18	Brian Le	BC/YK	140.22	18	51.18	18	89.04

=== Women ===
Rank	Name	Section	Total points	SP		FS	
1	Alaine Chartrand	ON	185.91	5	59.22	1	126.69
2	Aurora Cotop	ON	169.35	6	58.98	2	110.37
3	Véronik Mallet	QC	168.53	3	60.55	3	107.98
4	Larkyn Austman	BC/YK	168.13	2	64.53	5	103.60
5	Gabrielle Daleman	ON	166.92	1	70.18	8	96.74
6	Michelle Long	ON	161.40	8	54.76	4	106.64
7	Alison Schumacher	ON	157.73	4	60.10	7	97.63
8	Emy Decelles	QC	155.13	9	54.62	6	100.51
9	Olivia Gran	BC/YK	147.65	11	52.39	9	95.62
10	Emily Bausback	BC/YK	146.43	10	54.61	10	91.82
11	Aislinn Ganci	BC/YK	139.45	7	54.92	13	85.53
12	Jane Gray	QC	137.38	14	46.92	11	90.46
13	Sarah Maude-Blanchard	ON	135.80	12	50.27	12	85.53
14	Sarah Tamura	BC/YK	129.24	15	45.50	14	83.75
15	Madison Moore	AB/NT/NU	124.76	16	44.17	15	80.59
16	Helene Carle	AB/NT/NU	123.57	13	49.86	17	73.71
17	Beatrice Lavoie-Leonard	QC	118.31	17	43.98	16	74.33
WD	Alicia Pineault	QC	withdrew from competition				

=== Pairs ===
Rank	Name	Section	Total points	SP		FS	
1	Kirsten Moore-Towers / Michael Marinaro	ON	202.75	1	71.47	1	131.28
2	Evelyn Walsh / Trennt Michaud	ON	187.87	2	65.20	2	124.67
3	Camille Ruest / Andrew Wolfe	QC	166.84	3	62.46	4	104.38
4	Lori-Ann Matte / Thierry Ferland	QC	163.28	4	62.25	6	101.03
5	Justine Brasseur / Mark Bardei	QC	162.26	5	56.98	3	105.28
6	Mariah McCaw / Steven Adcock	ON	150.18	6	47.05	5	103.13

=== Ice dance ===
Rank	Name	Section	Total points	RD		FD	
1	Kaitlyn Weaver / Andrew Poje	ON	213.78	1	85.19	2	128.59
2	Piper Gilles / Paul Poirier	ON	212.31	2	83.08	1	129.23
3	Laurence Fournier Beaudry / Nikolaj Sørensen	QC	198.41	3	79.41	3	119.00
4	Haley Sales / Nikolas Wamsteeker	BC/YK	167.60	5	65.56	4	102.04
5	Carolane Soucisse / Shane Firus	QC	163.48	4	73.36	6	90.12
6	Molly Lanaghan / Dmitre Razgulajevs	ON	150.16	6	59.48	5	90.68
7	Gina Cipriano / Jake Richardson	QC	129.69	7	51.73	8	77.96
8	Elysia-Marie Campbell / Philippe Granger	QC	123.83	8	44.16	7	79.67

== Junior results ==
=== Men ===
Rank	Name	Section	Total points	SP		FS	
1	Aleksa Rakic	BC/YK	199.10	2	68.44	1	130.66
2	Beres Clements	BC/YK	191.02	4	64.44	2	126.58
3	Corey Circelli	ON	181.98	1	68.79	4	113.19
4	Bruce Waddell	ON	179.80	3	66.46	3	113.34
5	Alistair Lam	ON	175.86	5	64.31	7	111.55
6	Koen Kucher	SK	173.25	6	61.62	6	111.63
7	Jack Dushenski	ON	166.59	9	53.97	5	112.62
8	Alec Guinzbourg	ON	164.54	7	59.01	9	105.53
9	Dawson Nodwell	AB/NT/NU	160.71	12	51.82	8	108.89
10	Antoine Goyette	ON	145.28	11	52.54	12	92.74
11	Loucas Éthier	QC	144.64	15	49.24	10	95.40
12	Gabriel Blumenthal	BC/YK	144.12	14	49.63	11	94.49
13	Justin Hampole	BC/YK	141.63	10	53.46	13	88.17
14	Tristan Taylor	SK	140.43	8	54.24	14	86.19
15	Bryan Pierro	QC	133.76	13	51.65	15	82.11
16	Brian Chiem	AB/NT/NU	126.24	16	46.35	16	79.89
17	Hugo Li	ON	118.93	17	46.33	17	72.60
18	Christopher Fan	BC/YK	106.02	18	37.11	18	68.91
WD	Alexis Lay	QC	withdrew from competition				

=== Women ===
Rank	Name	Section	Total points	SP		FS	
1	Hannah Dawson	ON	140.92	3	48.04	1	92.88
2	Madeline Schizas	ON	134.59	6	46.77	2	87.82
3	Reagan Scott	ON	134.46	2	49.04	3	85.42
4	Emma Bulawka	BC/YK	129.44	1	52.44	7	77.00
5	Hana Watanabe	ON	127.21	4	47.62	5	79.59
6	Sandrine Bouchard	QC	125.27	5	46.79	6	78.48
7	Élodie Adsuar	QC	124.92	11	44.00	4	80.92
8	Elizabeth Hatzis	QC	119.68	9	44.85	9	74.83
9	Natalie D'Alessandro	ON	118.84	12	43.68	8	75.16
10	Rosalie Vincent	QC	118.05	10	44.37	10	73.68
11	Amelia Orzel	ON	116.29	8	45.37	12	70.92
12	Haley Gillett	AB/NT/NU	111.36	15	38.57	11	72.79
13	Lititia Chen	BC/YK	111.24	13	43.58	15	67.66
14	Lilika Zheng	ON	110.47	14	40.42	13	70.05
15	Leah Lee	BC/YK	109.14	7	45.93	16	63.21
16	Lissa Anne McGaghey	NB	101.68	18	33.34	14	68.34
17	Natalie Walker	ON	95.78	17	35.54	17	60.24
18	Emmanuelle Proft	ON	83.63	16	37.31	18	46.32
WD	Daria Carr	BC/YK	withdrew from competition				

=== Pairs ===
Rank	Name	Section	Total points	SP		FS	
1	Chloe Choinard / Mathieu Ostiguy	QC	142.03	1	50.67	1	91.36
2	Brooke McIntosh / Brandon Toste	ON	137.91	2	;49.40	2	88.51
3	Gabrielle Levesque / Pier-Alexandre Hudon	QC	135.67	4	48.59	3	87.08
4	Chloe Panetta / Benjamin Mimar	QC	133.55	5	46.74	4	86.81
5	Marin Ono / Matthew den Boer	AB/NT/NU	124.25	7	43.63	5	80.62
6	Giuliana Corsini / Zachary Daleman	ON	119.75	8	41.95	6	77.80
7	Olivia Boys-Eddy / Mackenzie Boys-Eddy	ON	118.96	3	48.68	8	70.28
8	Patricia Andrew / Paxton Fletcher	ON	109.88	6	44.87	9	65.01
9	Camille Perreault / Bryan Pierro	QC	104.54	9	34.15	7	70.39

=== Ice dance ===
Rank	Name	Section	Total points	RD		FD	
1	Marjorie Lajoie / Zachary Lagha	QC	179.71	1	70.87	1	108.84
2	Alicia Fabbri / Paul Ayer	QC	158.57	2	62.20	3	96.37
3	Natalie D'Alessandro / Bruce Waddell	ON	155.79	6	58.75	2	97.04
4	Ellie Fisher / Simon-Pierre Malette-Paquette	QC	152.78	4	60.23	5	92.55
5	Yuka Orihara / Lee Royer	BC/YK	151.82	3	60.41	6	91.41
6	Emmy Bronsard / Aissa Bouaraguia	QC	149.87	7	55.90	4	93.97
7	Irina Galiyanova / Grayson Lochhead	ON	145.65	5	59.58	8	86.07
8	Olivia McIsaac / Corey Circelli	ON	142.31	9	54.43	7	87.88
9	Miku Makita / Tyler Gunara	BC/YK	139.31	8	55.53	9	83.78
10	Nadiia Bashynska / Peter Beaumont	ON	132.29	10	52.36	10	79.93
11	Jessica Li / Jacob Richmond	QC	124.91	12	48.13	11	76.78
12	Jessica-Lee Behiel / Jackson Behiel	AB/NT/NU	124.83	11	51.74	13	73.09
13	Colleen Tordoff / Vladimir Tchernov	ON	119.61	13	46.84	14	72.77
14	Erin Gillies / Joshua Tarry	ON	118.45	14	44.53	12	73.92
15	Sophia O'Brien-Doerksen / Kyle Pearson	AB/NT/NU	109.52	15	40.23	15	69.29
WD	Ashlynne Stairs / Elliott Graham	ON	withdrew from competition				

== International team selections ==
=== World Championships ===
Skate Canada will announce the team for the 2019 World Championships after the championships.

	Men	Ladies	Pairs	Ice dancing
	Nam Nguyen	Alaine Chartrand	Kirsten Moore-Towers / Michael Marinaro	Kaitlyn Weaver / Andrew Poje
	Keegan Messing	Gabrielle Daleman	Evelyn Walsh / Trennt Michaud	Piper Gilles / Paul Poirier
		Aurora Cotop		Laurence Fournier Beaudry / Nikolaj Sørensen
1st alt.	Nicolas Nadeau	Véronik Mallet	Camille Ruest / Andrew Wolfe	Haley Sales / Nikolas Wamsteeker
2nd alt.	Conrad Orzel	Alicia Pineault		Carolane Soucisse / Shane Firus
3rd alt.	Roman Sadovsky			

=== Four Continents Championships ===
Skate Canada will announce the team for the 2019 Four Continents Championships after the championships.

	Men	Ladies	Pairs	Ice dancing
	Nam Nguyen	Alaine Chartrand	Kirsten Moore-Towers / Michael Marinaro	Kaitlyn Weaver / Andrew Poje
	Keegan Messing	Véronik Mallet	Evelyn Walsh / Trennt Michaud	Piper Gilles / Paul Poirier
	Nicolas Nadeau	Larkyn Austman	Camille Ruest / Andrew Wolfe	Laurence Fournier Beaudry / Nikolaj Sørensen
1st alt.	Roman Sadovsky	Michelle Long		Molly Lanaghan / Dmitre Razgulajevs
2nd alt.	Bennet Toman			Haley Sales / Nikolas Wamsteeker
3rd alt.				Carolane Soucisse / Shane Firus

=== World Junior Championships ===
Skate Canada will announce the team for the 2019 World Junior Championships after the championships.

	Men	Ladies	Pairs	Ice dancing
	Stephen Gogolev	Alison Schumacher	Brooke McIntosh / Brandon Toste	Marjorie Lajoie / Zachary Lagha
	Joseph Phan		Gabrielle Levesque / Pier-Alexandre Hudon	Alicia Fabbri / Paul Ayer
1st alt.	Iliya Kovler	Sarah-Maude Blanchard	Patricia Andrew / Paxton Fletcher	Emmy Bronsard / Aissa Bouaraguia
2nd alt.	Conrad Orzel	Emma Bulawka		Natalie D'Alessandro / Bruce Waddell
3rd alt.	Aleksa Rakic	Hannah Dawson		Ellie Fisher / Simon-Pierre Malette-Paquette
