= Haley Sales =

Canadian ice dancer

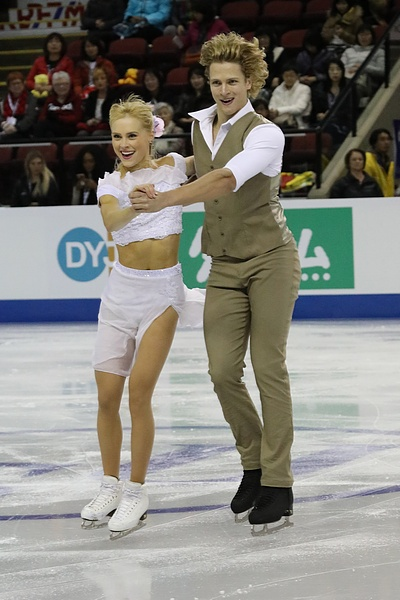

Personal information
- Born: December 26, 1996 (age 29) Quesnel, British Columbia
- Height: 1.64 m (5 ft 4 1/2 in)

Figure skating career
- Country: Canada
- Partner: Nikolas Wamsteeker
- Coach: Scott Moir, Madison Hubbell, Adrián Díaz
- Skating club: Kelowna SC
- Began skating: 2000

Haley Sales (born December 26, 1996) is a Canadian ice dancer. With her skating partner, Nikolas Wamsteeker, she is the 2020 Bavarian Open bronze medallist and 2018 Lake Placid Ice Dance International bronze medallist. The two placed 9th at the 2018 Four Continents Championships.

== Personal life ==
Sales was born on December 26, 1996, in Quesnel, British Columbia. She was raised in Quesnel before moving to the Vancouver area.

== Skating career ==
=== Early years ===
Sales began learning to skate in 2000. She won the bronze medal in the novice ladies' category at the 2012 Canadian Championships. She started training in ice dancing without a partner.

=== Partnership with Wamsteeker ===
Sales teamed up with Nikolas Wamsteeker in March 2014. They decided to train under Megan Wing and Aaron Lowe in Burnaby, British Columbia. The two placed ninth in the junior event at the 2015 Canadian Championships. The following season, they competed at one ISU Junior Grand Prix event, finishing sixth in Austria, and ranked fourth at the 2016 Canadian Championships.

Sales/Wamsteeker made their senior international debut at the Lake Placid Ice Dance International in late July 2016. They finished seventh in Lake Placid, ninth at the 2016 CS Autumn Classic International, and fifth at the 2017 Canadian Championships.

Competing in their second senior season, Sales/Wamsteeker placed tenth at the 2017 CS Nebelhorn Trophy and 6th at the 2018 Canadian Championships. They were selected to represent Canada at the 2018 Four Continents Championships in Taipei, Taiwan; the duo finished ninth after placing eighth in the short dance and tenth in the free.

They won a bronze medal at the Lake Placid International Dance trophy and then placed fourth at the 2018 U.S. Classic. They made their Grand Prix debut at the 2018 Skate Canada International, where they placed ninth. At the 2019 Canadian Championships, they placed a career-best fourth, a placement the replicated the following year despite a fall by Sales in the rhythm dance.

Sales/Wamsteeker were assigned to the 2020 Skate Canada International, but the event was cancelled as a result of the coronavirus pandemic. They placed fourth at the virtually-held 2021 Skate Canada Challenge, while the 2021 Canadian Championships were subsequently cancelled.

In June 2021, Sales/Wamsteeker announced that they would be moving to train at the Ice Academy of Montreal's campus in London, Ontario, coached by two-time Olympic champion Scott Moir.

== Programs ==
(with Wamsteeker)

Season	Rhythm dance	Free dance	Exhibition
2022–2023	Rhumba: Quizás, quizás, quizás performed by Pink Martini; Cha Cha: Ohayoo Ohio by Pink Martini; Samba: A Volta Da Gafieira by Alcione choreo. by Adrián Díaz	All I Ask of You by Josh Groban, Kelly Clarkson; Phantasia by Geoffrey Alexander choreo. by Adrián Díaz	La Percussion (104 BPM Workout Remix) by Ottomix & Yano; Quizás, quizás, quizás performed by Pink Martini; Batucada Brasileira by Estudios Talkback
2021–2022	Blues: Lost Cause; Hip Hop: Bad Guy by Billie Eilish choreo. by Scott Moir, Mark Pillay	Scared to Be Lonely; Scared to Be Lonely (Joe Mason Remix) by Dua Lipa choreo. by Scott Moir, Mark Pillay	
2019–2021	Quickstep: Dancing Queen; Swing: Mamma Mia; Swing: Mamma Mia (Glee version) (from Mamma Mia) by Benny Andersson, Björn Ulvaeus, Stig Anderson	S'Apre per te il mio cuor (from Samson and Delilah) by Camille Saint-Saëns performed by Filippa Giordano; Bacchanale (from Samson and Delilah) by Camille Saint-Saëns	
2018–2019	Tango: Compilation 27 Volver by Maxime Rodriguez; Argentine Tango: Que Faita Que Me Haces - Forever Tango by Lisandro Adrover	Seduces Me; Ne Me Quitte Pas by Celine Dion	
2017–2018	Rhumba: La Belleza performed by Marta Sánchez; Cha Cha: Cuentame que te paso performed by Pepe & The Bottle Blondes	Robin and Marian; Robin and Marian Suite by John Barry; Planting the Fields by Marc Streitenfeld; The Ride to Sherwood/The Ride to Nottingham by John Barry	
2016–2017	Feeling Good by Nina Simone	Somebody to Love; Love of My Life; Somebody to Love by Queen	
2015–2016	Foxtrot: Steppin' Out with My Baby performed by Doris Day; Waltz: Old-Fashioned Walk performed by Doris Day, Frank Sinatra	Spartacus by Alex North	
2014–2015	Suerte by Shakira; Do You Only Wanna Dance by Julio Daviel Big Band	Sweet Charity; Big Spender; A Good Impression; If My Friends Could See Me Now	

== Competitive highlights ==
GP: Grand Prix; CS: Challenger Series; JGP: Junior Grand Prix

=== Ice dancing with Wamsteeker ===
International
Event	14–15	15–16	16–17	17–18	18–19	19–20	20–21	21–22	22–23	23–24
Four Continents				9th				7th		
GP Skate Canada					9th	10th	C	10th		
GP Wilson Trophy									9th	
CS Autumn Classic			9th					6th		
CS Nebelhorn				10th		11th				
CS U.S. Classic					4th				5th	
Bavarian Open						3rd				
Lake Placid IDI			7th	8th	3rd				5th	
International: Junior
JGP Austria		6th								
Lake Placid IDI		4th								
National
Canadian Champ.	9th J	4th J	5th	6th	4th	4th	C	6th	5th	8th
SC Challenge	9th J	3rd J	3rd	1st	2nd		4th	2nd	WD	3rd
TBD = Assigned; WD = Withdrew; C = Event cancelled Levels: J = Junior
