= Larkyn Austman =

Canadian figure skater

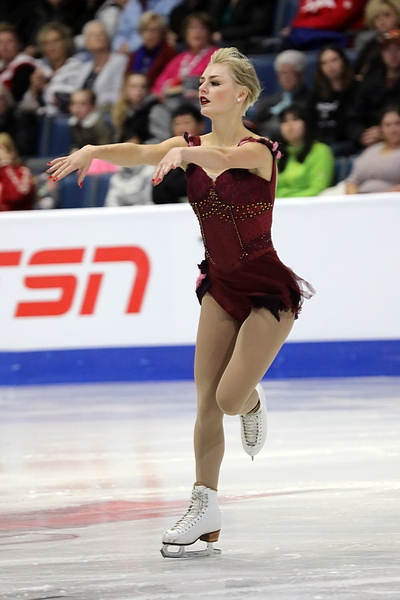
- Austman at 2017 Skate Canada International

Personal information
- Born: February 22, 1998 (age 28) New Westminster, British Columbia, Canada
- Home town: Coquitlam, British Columbia
- Height: 1.65 m (5 ft 5 in)

Figure skating career
- Country: Canada
- Skating club: Coquitlam SC
- Began skating: 2000
- Retired: May 10, 2019

Larkyn Austman (born February 22, 1998) is a former competitive Canadian figure skater. She is the 2017 International Challenge Cup bronze medalist and the 2018 Canadian national bronze medalist.

On the junior level, she is the 2013 Canadian junior national champion and the 2012 Canadian junior national silver medalist.

She placed 25th at the 2018 Winter Olympics.

== Personal life ==
Larkyn Austman was born February 22, 1998, in New Westminster, British Columbia, Canada. Her parents, Heather and Leonard, both competed in figure skating, and her older brother, Connor, played ice hockey. Her mother, formerly Heather Anderson, won the Canadian national novice ladies' title in 1974.

Austman attended Hillcrest Middle School and Dr. Charles Best Secondary School in Coquitlam, graduating in June 2016. She became a vegan in June 2015.

== Career ==
=== Early years ===
Austman began learning to skate in 2000. She was a flower retriever at the 2010 Winter Olympics in Vancouver. She won silver competing on the novice level at the 2012 Canadian Championships and gold as a junior at the 2013 Canadian Championships.

=== 2013–2014 season ===
In 2013, due to boot problems, Austman developed tendinitis in both of her Achilles tendons, causing her to miss part of the 2013–2014 season. In October, she debuted on the ISU Junior Grand Prix (JGP) series, finishing eighth in Tallinn, Estonia. In January, making her senior debut, she placed tenth at the 2014 Canadian Championships.

In March, Austman competed at the 2014 World Junior Championships in Sofia, Bulgaria. Ranked eighteenth in the short program, she qualified to the free skate and finished sixteenth overall. She was coached by Heather Austman and Eileen Murphy in Richmond and Coquitlam, British Columbia.

=== 2014–2015 and 2015–2016 seasons ===
In 2014, Austman spent three months training in Colorado Springs, Colorado under Christy Krall. In August, she placed tenth at her 2014 Junior Grand Prix assignment in France. She quit skating in December but started to reconsider in March 2015.

Austman rejoined Coquitlam Skating Club and resumed training, skating at the Poirier Sport and Leisure Complex. She finished sixth at the 2016 Canadian Championships.

=== 2016–2017 season ===
Coached by Zdeněk Pazdírek in Coquitlam, Austman made her senior international debut in late September at the 2016 CS Autumn Classic International, a Challenger Series competition where she placed 12th. Ranked fifth in the short and fourth in the free, she finished fourth at the 2017 Canadian Championships, thus making the national team. In February 2017, she won her first international medal, bronze at the International Challenge Cup in The Hague, Netherlands.

=== 2017–2018 season ===
In addition to training in British Columbia, Austman trained in Edmonton during the summer and in Colorado Springs, Colorado for five weeks during the winter. She crowdfunded to cover her expenses and received financial aid of $30,000 from Horatio Kemeny.

In January, Austman won the bronze medal at the 2018 Canadian Championships. The following day, she was named in Canada's 2018 Olympic and 2018 World teams. In February, she competed at the 2018 Winter Olympics in PyeongChang, South Korea. Ranked twenty-fifth in the short program, she missed qualifying for the final segment by one spot. She had the same result at the 2018 World Championships in Milan, Italy.

=== 2018–2019 season ===
Austman sprained her left foot in September 2018, causing her to withdraw from the 2018 Skate Canada International.

At the 2019 Canadian Championships, Austman returned to competition, and placed second in the short program, skating cleanly. She stated that her result there validated her decision to withdraw from the Grand Prix, which would otherwise have worsened her physical health and confidence. She was less successful in the free skate, dropping to fourth place overall. Austman was assigned to compete at the 2019 Four Continents Championships, as silver medalist Aurora Cotop lacked the technical minimum scores necessary to attend. She finished tenth at Four Continents, setting personal bests in the process, but failed to obtain the short program technical minimum score necessary to be eligible to attend the World Championships, missing it by 0.01 points.

On May 10, Austman announced her retirement from competitive skating through a post on Instagram.

== Programs ==
Season	Short program	Free skating
2018–2019	Bang Bang by Asaf Avidan choreo. by Mark Pillay	The Sound of Silence performed by Cinematic Pop, Mckenna Breinhurt choreo. by Mark Pillay
2017–2018	Mein Herr (from Cabaret) by John Kander, Fred Ebb choreo. by Mark Pillay	The Great Gatsby (soundtrack); Les Misérables by Claude-Michel Schönberg choreo. by Mark Pillay
2013–2015	Caravan by Juan Tizol, Duke Ellington	Samson and Delilah by Camille Saint-Saëns
2012–2013		Danse macabre by Camille Saint-Saëns

== Competitive highlights ==
GP: Grand Prix; CS: Challenger Series; JGP: Junior Grand Prix

International
Event	12–13	13–14	14–15	15–16	16–17	17–18	18–19
Olympics						25th	
Worlds						25th	
Four Continents							10th
GP Skate Canada						12th	WD
CS Autumn Classic					12th		WD
CS Ondrej Nepela						12th	
Cup of Tyrol							6th
Int. Challenge Cup					3rd		
International: Junior
Junior Worlds		16th					
JGP Estonia		8th					
JGP France			10th				
National
Canadian Champ.	1st J	10th		6th	4th	3rd	4th
Skate Canada Challenge				3rd			1st
