= Liam Fawcett =

Australian rules footballer (born 2005)

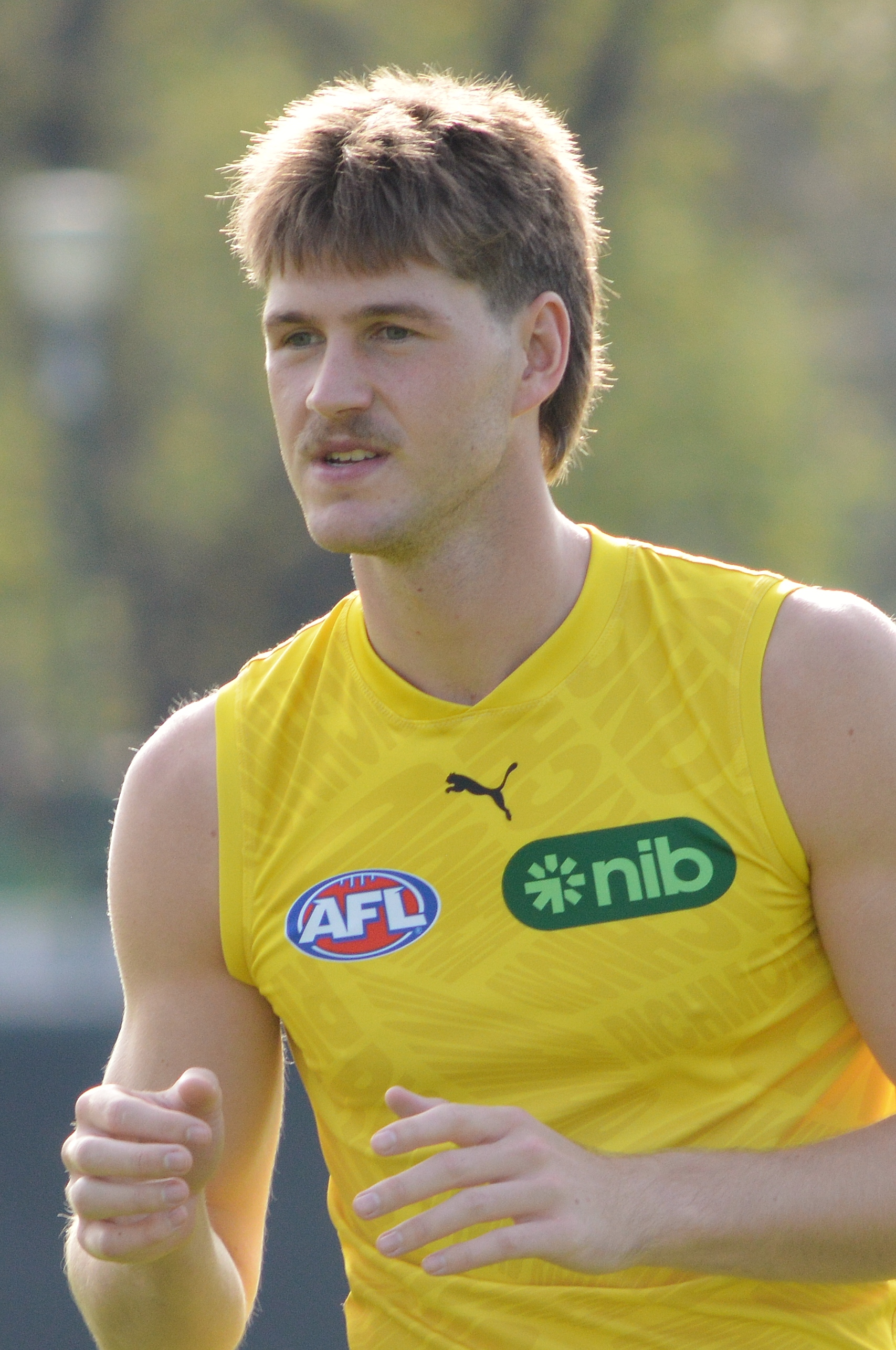
- Fawcett in May 2026

Personal information
- Born: 22 April 2005 (age 21)
- Original teams: Pooraka (AdFL); Central District (SANFL)
- Draft: No. 43, 2023 AFL draft
- Debut: Round 2, 2025, Richmond vs. Port Adelaide, at Adelaide Oval
- Height: 197 cm (6 ft 6 in)
- Position: Key Forward

Playing career^{1}
Years	Club	Games (Goals)
2024–2026	Richmond	8 (12)
- ^{1} Playing statistics correct to the end of 2026.

Liam Fawcett (born 22 April 2005) is an Australian rules footballer who last played for the Richmond Football Club in the Australian Football League (AFL). A key position forward, he was selected in the second round of the 2023 AFL draft and made his debut more than a year later, in round 2 of the 2025 season.

== Early life and junior football ==
Fawcettt played junior representative football with Central District in the South Australian National Football League. He attended school at Trinity College, Gawler from year 10 and played football for the school's side in the Sports Association for Adelaide Schools competition.

== AFL career ==
Fawcett was drafted by Richmond with the club's second selection and the 43rd pick overall in the 2023 AFL draft.

He was unavailable to play in almost all of the 2024 season due to a long-term back injury and the effects of glandular fever.

He made his first appearance in a competitive match with the club's senior team in a 2025 pre-season match against Collingwood. Fawcett made his AFL debut in round 2 of the 2025 season, kicking one goal in a loss to Port Adelaide.

== Statistics ==
Updated to the end of round 22, 2026.

Legend
G	Goals	K	Kicks	D	Disposals	T	Tackles
B	Behinds	H	Handballs	M	Marks

Season	Team	No.	Games	Totals							Averages (per game)							Votes
Season	Team	No.	Games	G	B	K	H	D	M	T	G	B	K	H	D	M	T	Votes
2024		37	0	—	—	—	—	—	—	—	—	—	—	—	—	—	—	0
2025	Richmond	37	1	1	0	3	2	5	2	0	1.0	0.0	3.0	2.0	5.0	2.0	0.0	0
2026	Richmond	43	7	11	3	29	9	38	18	6	1.6	0.4	4.1	1.3	5.4	2.6	0.9	0
Career			8	12	3	32	11	43	20	6	1.5	0.4	4.0	1.4	5.4	2.5	0.8	0
