= Let's Take an Old-Fashioned Walk (Irving Berlin song) =

Song
- Published: 1949
- Songwriter(s): Irving Berlin

"Let's Take an Old-Fashioned Walk" is a popular song written by Irving Berlin and published in 1949.

== Background ==
The song was introduced by Eddie Albert and Allyn McLerie in the musical Miss Liberty.

The studio cast recording for RCA Victor included Al Goodman and His Orchestra with Wynn Murray, Martha Wright, Bob Wright, Sandra Deel, and Jimmy Carroll.

== Other recordings ==
It has since become a pop standard, with many recorded versions. Major hits at the time of introduction included: Perry Como and a duet by Frank Sinatra and Doris Day. Both recordings made the US Top 20: The Como recording made it to #15, and the Sinatra/Shore duet made it to #17
