= 2020–21 ISU World Standings and Season's World Ranking =

Merit-based ice skating ranking

Season-end No. 1 skaters
- Men's singles: (United States) Nathan Chen
- Ladies' singles: (Japan) Rika Kihira
- Pairs: (China) Peng Cheng / Jin Yang
- Ice dance: (Russia) Victoria Sinitsina / Nikita Katsalapov

Season's No. 1 skaters
- Men's singles: (United States) Nathan Chen
- Ladies' singles: (Russia) Anna Shcherbakova
- Pairs: (Russia) Anastasia Mishina / Aleksandr Galliamov
- Ice dance: (Russia) Victoria Sinitsina / Nikita Katsalapov

Season-end No. 1 teams
- Senior Synchronized: (Russia) Team Paradise
- Junior Synchronized: (Russia) Team Junost Junior

Season's No. 1 teams
- Senior Synchronized: N/A
- Junior Synchronized: N/A

Navigation

The 2020–21 ISU World Standings and Season's World Ranking are the World Standings and Season's World Ranking published by the International Skating Union (ISU) during the 2020–21 season.

The single & pair skating and ice dance World Standings take into account the results of the 2018–19, 2019–20, and 2020–21 seasons.

The 2020–21 ISU Season's World Ranking is based on the results of the 2020–21 season only.

Due to the COVID-19 pandemic, the 2021 World Championships was the only event to affect World Standings. The ISU determined that it would be unfair to award World Standing points at the Challenger Series and Grand Prix events in light of the vast difference in skaters' travel restrictions. The Junior Grand Prix and 2021 World Junior Championships were cancelled, leaving no opportunities for junior skaters to earn World Standing Points.

== World Standings for single & pair skating and ice dance ==
=== Season-end standings ===
==== Men ====
As of March 27, 2021.

Rank	Nation	Skater	Points	Season	ISU Championships or Olympics	(Junior) Grand Prix and Final		Selected International Competition	
Rank	Nation	Skater	Points	Season	Best	Best	2nd Best	Best	2nd Best
1	USA	Nathan Chen	4080	2020/2021 season (100%)	1200				
1	USA	Nathan Chen	4080	2019/2020 season (100%)		800	400		
1	USA	Nathan Chen	4080	2018/2019 season (70%)	840	560	280		
2	JPN	Yuzuru Hanyu	4002	2020/2021 season (100%)	972				
2	JPN	Yuzuru Hanyu	4002	2019/2020 season (100%)	840	720	400	300	
2	JPN	Yuzuru Hanyu	4002	2018/2019 season (70%)	(756)	280	280	210	
3	JPN	Shoma Uno	3515	2020/2021 season (100%)	875				
3	JPN	Shoma Uno	3515	2019/2020 season (100%)		292	191	300	250
3	JPN	Shoma Uno	3515	2018/2019 season (70%)	613	504	280	210	
4	USA	Jason Brown	3096	2020/2021 season (100%)	638				
4	USA	Jason Brown	3096	2019/2020 season (100%)	756	360	262	300	
4	USA	Jason Brown	3096	2018/2019 season (70%)	(386)	252	165	210	153
5	RUS	Alexander Samarin	3046	2020/2021 season (100%)					
5	RUS	Alexander Samarin	3046	2019/2020 season (100%)	325	583	400	250	219
5	RUS	Alexander Samarin	3046	2018/2019 season (70%)	529	227	204	170	139
6	RUS	Dmitri Aliev	2957	2020/2021 season (100%)					
6	RUS	Dmitri Aliev	2957	2019/2020 season (100%)	840	472	360	300	270
6	RUS	Dmitri Aliev	2957	2018/2019 season (70%)		204	183	189	139
7	ITA	Matteo Rizzo	2859	2020/2021 season (100%)	(418)				
7	ITA	Matteo Rizzo	2859	2019/2020 season (100%)	551	324	236	270	243
7	ITA	Matteo Rizzo	2859	2018/2019 season (70%)	476	227	204	175	153
8	CAN	Keegan Messing	2794	2020/2021 season (100%)	709				
8	CAN	Keegan Messing	2794	2019/2020 season (100%)	(402)	292	292	243	
8	CAN	Keegan Messing	2794	2018/2019 season (70%)	428	368	252	210	
9	KOR	Cha Jun-hwan	2721	2020/2021 season (100%)	465				
9	KOR	Cha Jun-hwan	2721	2019/2020 season (100%)	551	236	191	219	
9	KOR	Cha Jun-hwan	2721	2018/2019 season (70%)	347	454	227	189	189
10	GEO	Morisi Kvitelashvili	2719	2020/2021 season (100%)	305				
10	GEO	Morisi Kvitelashvili	2719	2019/2020 season (100%)	680	292	213	270	250
10	GEO	Morisi Kvitelashvili	2719	2018/2019 season (70%)	(237)	252	134	170	153
11	JPN	Yuma Kagiyama	2708	2020/2021 season (100%)	1080				
11	JPN	Yuma Kagiyama	2708	2019/2020 season (100%)	680	255	250		
11	JPN	Yuma Kagiyama	2708	2018/2019 season (70%)		158	127	158	
12	FRA	Kévin Aymoz	2694	2020/2021 season (100%)	517				
12	FRA	Kévin Aymoz	2694	2019/2020 season (100%)		648	360	270	
12	FRA	Kévin Aymoz	2694	2018/2019 season (70%)	428	183	149	139	
13	ITA	Daniel Grassl	2688	2020/2021 season (100%)	377				
13	ITA	Daniel Grassl	2688	2019/2020 season (100%)	612	250	207	300	300
13	ITA	Daniel Grassl	2688	2018/2019 season (70%)	(347)	142	115	210	175
14	CHN	Jin Boyang	2571	2020/2021 season (100%)	(131)				
14	CHN	Jin Boyang	2571	2019/2020 season (100%)	612	525	400	300	
14	CHN	Jin Boyang	2571	2018/2019 season (70%)	551	183			
15	CAN	Nam Nguyen	2123	2020/2021 season (100%)					
15	CAN	Nam Nguyen	2123	2019/2020 season (100%)	496	360	262	219	
15	CAN	Nam Nguyen	2123	2018/2019 season (70%)	228	183	165	210	
16	RUS	Mikhail Kolyada	2111	2020/2021 season (100%)	787				
16	RUS	Mikhail Kolyada	2111	2019/2020 season (100%)					
16	RUS	Mikhail Kolyada	2111	2018/2019 season (70%)	496	204	204	210	210
17	LAT	Deniss Vasiļjevs	2075	2020/2021 season (100%)	(200)				
17	LAT	Deniss Vasiļjevs	2075	2019/2020 season (100%)	496	262	236	243	
17	LAT	Deniss Vasiļjevs	2075	2018/2019 season (70%)	205	149	134	175	175
18	RUS	Artur Danielian	1923	2020/2021 season (100%)					
18	RUS	Artur Danielian	1923	2019/2020 season (100%)	756	225	225	219	
18	RUS	Artur Danielian	1923	2018/2019 season (70%)	256	127	115		
19	USA	Camden Pulkinen	1907	2020/2021 season (100%)					
19	USA	Camden Pulkinen	1907	2019/2020 season (100%)	293	292	191	198	178
19	USA	Camden Pulkinen	1907	2018/2019 season (70%)	167	175	161	127	125
20	JPN	Keiji Tanaka	1861	2020/2021 season (100%)					
20	JPN	Keiji Tanaka	1861	2019/2020 season (100%)		324	262	300	225
20	JPN	Keiji Tanaka	1861	2018/2019 season (70%)	312	134	134	170	
21	CZE	Michal Březina	1697	2020/2021 season (100%)	(180)				
21	CZE	Michal Březina	1697	2019/2020 season (100%)	446				
21	CZE	Michal Březina	1697	2018/2019 season (70%)	402	408	252	189	
22	RUS	Petr Gumennik	1687	2020/2021 season (100%)					
22	RUS	Petr Gumennik	1687	2019/2020 season (100%)	405	250	230	270	
22	RUS	Petr Gumennik	1687	2018/2019 season (70%)	136	221	175		
23	USA	Tomoki Hiwatashi	1658	2020/2021 season (100%)					
23	USA	Tomoki Hiwatashi	1658	2019/2020 season (100%)	362	262		198	
23	USA	Tomoki Hiwatashi	1658	2018/2019 season (70%)	350	158	158	170	
24	FRA	Adam Siao Him Fa	1653	2020/2021 season (100%)					
24	FRA	Adam Siao Him Fa	1653	2019/2020 season (100%)	293	164	120	243	160
24	FRA	Adam Siao Him Fa	1653	2018/2019 season (70%)	207	179	175	112	
25	USA	Vincent Zhou	1652	2020/2021 season (100%)					
25	USA	Vincent Zhou	1652	2019/2020 season (100%)				243	
25	USA	Vincent Zhou	1652	2018/2019 season (70%)	680	204	183	189	153
26	RUS	Andrei Mozalev	1644	2020/2021 season (100%)					
26	RUS	Andrei Mozalev	1644	2019/2020 season (100%)	500	315	250	300	
26	RUS	Andrei Mozalev	1644	2018/2019 season (70%)		175	104		
27	JPN	Kazuki Tomono	1610	2020/2021 season (100%)					
27	JPN	Kazuki Tomono	1610	2019/2020 season (100%)	446	262	191	160	
27	JPN	Kazuki Tomono	1610	2018/2019 season (70%)	185	227		139	
28	AUS	Brendan Kerry	1533	2020/2021 season (100%)					
28	AUS	Brendan Kerry	1533	2019/2020 season (100%)	264	213		250	203
28	AUS	Brendan Kerry	1533	2018/2019 season (70%)	253			175	175
29	USA	Andrew Torgashev	1508	2020/2021 season (100%)					
29	USA	Andrew Torgashev	1508	2019/2020 season (100%)	239	182	182	270	
29	USA	Andrew Torgashev	1508	2018/2019 season (70%)		175	127	175	158
30	EST	Aleksandr Selevko	1490	2020/2021 season (100%)	247				
30	EST	Aleksandr Selevko	1490	2019/2020 season (100%)	215	164	120	225	219
30	EST	Aleksandr Selevko	1490	2018/2019 season (70%)	(109)			158	142
31	AZE	Vladimir Litvintsev	1387	2020/2021 season (100%)					
31	AZE	Vladimir Litvintsev	1387	2019/2020 season (100%)	362			250	203
31	AZE	Vladimir Litvintsev	1387	2018/2019 season (70%)	155	84		175	158
32	JPN	Sōta Yamamoto	1326	2020/2021 season (100%)					
32	JPN	Sōta Yamamoto	1326	2019/2020 season (100%)		236		270	270
32	JPN	Sōta Yamamoto	1326	2018/2019 season (70%)		165		210	175
33	RUS	Andrei Lazukin	1319	2020/2021 season (100%)					
33	RUS	Andrei Lazukin	1319	2019/2020 season (100%)		191		160	
33	RUS	Andrei Lazukin	1319	2018/2019 season (70%)	326	165	149	170	158
34	ISR	Mark Gorodnitsky	1197	2020/2021 season (100%)					
34	ISR	Mark Gorodnitsky	1197	2019/2020 season (100%)	156	164	133	164	160
34	ISR	Mark Gorodnitsky	1197	2018/2019 season (70%)	65	104	93	158	
35	ISR	Alexei Bychenko	1192	2020/2021 season (100%)	(106)				
35	ISR	Alexei Bychenko	1192	2019/2020 season (100%)	264	213		243	219
35	ISR	Alexei Bychenko	1192	2018/2019 season (70%)	253				
36	ITA	Gabriele Frangipani	1168	2020/2021 season (100%)					
36	ITA	Gabriele Frangipani	1168	2019/2020 season (100%)	237	133	108	219	
36	ITA	Gabriele Frangipani	1168	2018/2019 season (70%)	34	84	68	158	127
37	JPN	Shun Sato	1145	2020/2021 season (100%)					
37	JPN	Shun Sato	1145	2019/2020 season (100%)	295	350	250	250	
37	JPN	Shun Sato	1145	2018/2019 season (70%)					
38	CAN	Stephen Gogolev	1132	2020/2021 season (100%)					
38	CAN	Stephen Gogolev	1132	2019/2020 season (100%)	93	225	164		
38	CAN	Stephen Gogolev	1132	2018/2019 season (70%)	230	245	175		
39	UKR	Ivan Shmuratko	1124	2020/2021 season (100%)	146				
39	UKR	Ivan Shmuratko	1124	2019/2020 season (100%)	114	203	133	225	
39	UKR	Ivan Shmuratko	1124	2018/2019 season (70%)	(72)	93	68	142	
40	CAN	Roman Sadovsky	1099	2020/2021 season (100%)					
40	CAN	Roman Sadovsky	1099	2019/2020 season (100%)	173	324		243	
40	CAN	Roman Sadovsky	1099	2018/2019 season (70%)				189	170
41	RUS	Makar Ignatov	1080	2020/2021 season (100%)					
41	RUS	Makar Ignatov	1080	2019/2020 season (100%)		324	213	300	243
41	RUS	Makar Ignatov	1080	2018/2019 season (70%)					
42	GEO	Irakli Maysuradze	1052	2020/2021 season (100%)					
42	GEO	Irakli Maysuradze	1052	2019/2020 season (100%)	214			250	225
42	GEO	Irakli Maysuradze	1052	2018/2019 season (70%)	186	93	84		
43	SUI	Lukas Britschgi	1029	2020/2021 season (100%)	275				
43	SUI	Lukas Britschgi	1029	2019/2020 season (100%)	126			203	182
43	SUI	Lukas Britschgi	1029	2018/2019 season (70%)				142	101
44	CHN	Yan Han	1024	2020/2021 season (100%)	339				
44	CHN	Yan Han	1024	2019/2020 season (100%)	325	360			
44	CHN	Yan Han	1024	2018/2019 season (70%)					
45	AUT	Luc Maierhofer	1000	2020/2021 season (100%)					
45	AUT	Luc Maierhofer	1000	2019/2020 season (100%)		120		225	178
45	AUT	Luc Maierhofer	1000	2018/2019 season (70%)	79	76	68	139	115
46	CAN	Joseph Phan	995	2020/2021 season (100%)					
46	CAN	Joseph Phan	995	2019/2020 season (100%)	157	164	148	198	
46	CAN	Joseph Phan	995	2018/2019 season (70%)	110	142	76		
47	GER	Paul Fentz	960	2020/2021 season (100%)					
47	GER	Paul Fentz	960	2019/2020 season (100%)	402				
47	GER	Paul Fentz	960	2018/2019 season (70%)	134	165		158	101
48	JPN	Koshiro Shimada	953	2020/2021 season (100%)					
48	JPN	Koshiro Shimada	953	2019/2020 season (100%)				270	
48	JPN	Koshiro Shimada	953	2018/2019 season (70%)	151	199	158	175	
49	USA	Alexei Krasnozhon	938	2020/2021 season (100%)					
49	USA	Alexei Krasnozhon	938	2019/2020 season (100%)				219	
49	USA	Alexei Krasnozhon	938	2018/2019 season (70%)	122	149	134	175	139
50	KOR	Lee Si-hyeong	919	2020/2021 season (100%)					
50	KOR	Lee Si-hyeong	919	2019/2020 season (100%)	214	225	148	198	
50	KOR	Lee Si-hyeong	919	2018/2019 season (70%)	134				
51	USA	Ryan Dunk	889	2020/2021 season (100%)					
51	USA	Ryan Dunk	889	2019/2020 season (100%)		164	148	243	
51	USA	Ryan Dunk	889	2018/2019 season (70%)		115	104	115	
52	SWE	Nikolaj Majorov	848	2020/2021 season (100%)	118				
52	SWE	Nikolaj Majorov	848	2019/2020 season (100%)	192			225	144
52	SWE	Nikolaj Majorov	848	2018/2019 season (70%)	(43)	93	76		
53	BLR	Alexander Lebedev	840	2020/2021 season (100%)					
53	BLR	Alexander Lebedev	840	2019/2020 season (100%)	92	120		164	164
53	BLR	Alexander Lebedev	840	2018/2019 season (70%)				158	142
54	AUT	Maurizio Zandron	808	2020/2021 season (100%)					
54	AUT	Maurizio Zandron	808	2019/2020 season (100%)				250	225
54	AUT	Maurizio Zandron	808	2018/2019 season (70%)				175	158
55	ARM	Slavik Hayrapetyan	799	2020/2021 season (100%)					
55	ARM	Slavik Hayrapetyan	799	2019/2020 season (100%)	140			182	182
55	ARM	Slavik Hayrapetyan	799	2018/2019 season (70%)				153	142
55	RUS	Evgeni Semenenko	799	2020/2021 season (100%)	574				
55	RUS	Evgeni Semenenko	799	2019/2020 season (100%)				225	
55	RUS	Evgeni Semenenko	799	2018/2019 season (70%)					
57	CAN	Nicolas Nadeau	784	2020/2021 season (100%)					
57	CAN	Nicolas Nadeau	784	2019/2020 season (100%)		213	213		
57	CAN	Nicolas Nadeau	784	2018/2019 season (70%)	205			153	
58	TUR	Başar Oktar	777	2020/2021 season (100%)					
58	TUR	Başar Oktar	777	2019/2020 season (100%)	75	97	97	225	
58	TUR	Başar Oktar	777	2018/2019 season (70%)	53			115	115
59	ISR	Daniel Samohin	776	2020/2021 season (100%)					
59	ISR	Daniel Samohin	776	2019/2020 season (100%)				198	
59	ISR	Daniel Samohin	776	2018/2019 season (70%)	166	134		153	125
60	GBR	Graham Newberry	774	2020/2021 season (100%)					
60	GBR	Graham Newberry	774	2019/2020 season (100%)				225	178
60	GBR	Graham Newberry	774	2018/2019 season (70%)	71			158	142
61	TUR	Burak Demirboğa	759	2020/2021 season (100%)					
61	TUR	Burak Demirboğa	759	2019/2020 season (100%)	74			225	203
61	TUR	Burak Demirboğa	759	2018/2019 season (70%)				142	115
62	USA	Jimmy Ma	725	2020/2021 season (100%)					
62	USA	Jimmy Ma	725	2019/2020 season (100%)				219	178
62	USA	Jimmy Ma	725	2018/2019 season (70%)				170	158
63	RUS	Roman Savosin	711	2020/2021 season (100%)					
63	RUS	Roman Savosin	711	2019/2020 season (100%)					
63	RUS	Roman Savosin	711	2018/2019 season (70%)	315	142	115	139	
64	NOR	Sondre Oddvoll Bøe	699	2020/2021 season (100%)					
64	NOR	Sondre Oddvoll Bøe	699	2019/2020 season (100%)	102			182	
64	NOR	Sondre Oddvoll Bøe	699	2018/2019 season (70%)	98			175	142
65	KOR	Lee June-hyoung	693	2020/2021 season (100%)					
65	KOR	Lee June-hyoung	693	2019/2020 season (100%)	156			243	144
65	KOR	Lee June-hyoung	693	2018/2019 season (70%)	150				
66	EST	Mihhail Selevko	653	2020/2021 season (100%)					
66	EST	Mihhail Selevko	653	2019/2020 season (100%)		108	97	250	198
66	EST	Mihhail Selevko	653	2018/2019 season (70%)					
67	BUL	Nicky Obreykov	652	2020/2021 season (100%)					
67	BUL	Nicky Obreykov	652	2019/2020 season (100%)				203	164
67	BUL	Nicky Obreykov	652	2018/2019 season (70%)				158	127
68	CZE	Matyáš Bělohradský	646	2020/2021 season (100%)					
68	CZE	Matyáš Bělohradský	646	2019/2020 season (100%)	113	148			
68	CZE	Matyáš Bělohradský	646	2018/2019 season (70%)	88	104	68	125	
69	RUS	Egor Murashov	642	2020/2021 season (100%)					
69	RUS	Egor Murashov	642	2019/2020 season (100%)				198	
69	RUS	Egor Murashov	642	2018/2019 season (70%)		127		175	142
70	BUL	Larry Loupolover	630	2020/2021 season (100%)					
70	BUL	Larry Loupolover	630	2019/2020 season (100%)	83			250	182
70	BUL	Larry Loupolover	630	2018/2019 season (70%)				115	
71	JPN	Mitsuki Sumoto	624	2020/2021 season (100%)					
71	JPN	Mitsuki Sumoto	624	2019/2020 season (100%)				198	
71	JPN	Mitsuki Sumoto	624	2018/2019 season (70%)		158	115	153	
71	RUS	Artem Kovalev	624	2020/2021 season (100%)					
71	RUS	Artem Kovalev	624	2019/2020 season (100%)				270	250
71	RUS	Artem Kovalev	624	2018/2019 season (70%)		104			
73	CAN	Conrad Orzel	590	2020/2021 season (100%)					
73	CAN	Conrad Orzel	590	2019/2020 season (100%)				178	
73	CAN	Conrad Orzel	590	2018/2019 season (70%)		127	127	158	
74	RUS	Ilya Yablokov	579	2020/2021 season (100%)					
74	RUS	Ilya Yablokov	579	2019/2020 season (100%)	194	203	182		
74	RUS	Ilya Yablokov	579	2018/2019 season (70%)					
75	RUS	Gleb Lutfullin	567	2020/2021 season (100%)					
75	RUS	Gleb Lutfullin	567	2019/2020 season (100%)		203	182	182	
75	RUS	Gleb Lutfullin	567	2018/2019 season (70%)					
76	BLR	Konstantin Milyukov	557	2020/2021 season (100%)	222				
76	BLR	Konstantin Milyukov	557	2019/2020 season (100%)				182	
76	BLR	Konstantin Milyukov	557	2018/2019 season (70%)				153	
77	KOR	Cha Young-hyun	549	2020/2021 season (100%)					
77	KOR	Cha Young-hyun	549	2019/2020 season (100%)		164		160	
77	KOR	Cha Young-hyun	549	2018/2019 season (70%)	48	93	84		
78	JPN	Yuto Kishina	548	2020/2021 season (100%)					
78	JPN	Yuto Kishina	548	2019/2020 season (100%)				203	
78	JPN	Yuto Kishina	548	2018/2019 season (70%)		142	76	127	
79	RUS	Daniil Samsonov	534	2020/2021 season (100%)					
79	RUS	Daniil Samsonov	534	2019/2020 season (100%)		284	250		
79	RUS	Daniil Samsonov	534	2018/2019 season (70%)					
80	MAS	Julian Zhi Jie Yee	522	2020/2021 season (100%)					
80	MAS	Julian Zhi Jie Yee	522	2019/2020 season (100%)				178	
80	MAS	Julian Zhi Jie Yee	522	2018/2019 season (70%)	83	149		112	
81	GER	Jonathan Hess	512	2020/2021 season (100%)					
81	GER	Jonathan Hess	512	2019/2020 season (100%)				182	164
81	GER	Jonathan Hess	512	2018/2019 season (70%)	39			127	
82	EST	Daniel Albert Naurits	500	2020/2021 season (100%)					
82	EST	Daniel Albert Naurits	500	2019/2020 season (100%)				203	182
82	EST	Daniel Albert Naurits	500	2018/2019 season (70%)				115	
83	SUI	Nicola Todeschini	481	2020/2021 season (100%)					
83	SUI	Nicola Todeschini	481	2019/2020 season (100%)				164	
83	SUI	Nicola Todeschini	481	2018/2019 season (70%)				175	142
84	CAN	Iliya Kovler	480	2020/2021 season (100%)					
84	CAN	Iliya Kovler	480	2019/2020 season (100%)		148	97		
84	CAN	Iliya Kovler	480	2018/2019 season (70%)		142	93		
85	RUS	Mark Kondratiuk	475	2020/2021 season (100%)					
85	RUS	Mark Kondratiuk	475	2019/2020 season (100%)				250	225
85	RUS	Mark Kondratiuk	475	2018/2019 season (70%)					
86	RUS	Anton Shulepov	473	2020/2021 season (100%)					
86	RUS	Anton Shulepov	473	2019/2020 season (100%)		191			
86	RUS	Anton Shulepov	473	2018/2019 season (70%)				170	112
87	FIN	Roman Galay	465	2020/2021 season (100%)					
87	FIN	Roman Galay	465	2019/2020 season (100%)				178	160
87	FIN	Roman Galay	465	2018/2019 season (70%)				127	
88	FRA	Luc Economides	463	2020/2021 season (100%)					
88	FRA	Luc Economides	463	2019/2020 season (100%)				250	
88	FRA	Luc Economides	463	2018/2019 season (70%)				112	101
89	USA	Maxim Naumov	461	2020/2021 season (100%)					
89	USA	Maxim Naumov	461	2019/2020 season (100%)	328	133			
89	USA	Maxim Naumov	461	2018/2019 season (70%)					
90	BUL	Alexander Zlatkov	451	2020/2021 season (100%)					
90	BUL	Alexander Zlatkov	451	2019/2020 season (100%)				182	
90	BUL	Alexander Zlatkov	451	2018/2019 season (70%)				142	127
91	PHI	Christopher Caluza	444	2020/2021 season (100%)					
91	PHI	Christopher Caluza	444	2019/2020 season (100%)	140			160	144
91	PHI	Christopher Caluza	444	2018/2019 season (70%)					
92	TPE	Tsao Chih-i	430	2020/2021 season (100%)					
92	TPE	Tsao Chih-i	430	2019/2020 season (100%)	83				
92	TPE	Tsao Chih-i	430	2018/2019 season (70%)				189	158
93	USA	Ilia Malinin	418	2020/2021 season (100%)					
93	USA	Ilia Malinin	418	2019/2020 season (100%)	103	182	133		
93	USA	Ilia Malinin	418	2018/2019 season (70%)					
94	CAN	Aleksa Rakic	413	2020/2021 season (100%)					
94	CAN	Aleksa Rakic	413	2019/2020 season (100%)		225			
94	CAN	Aleksa Rakic	413	2018/2019 season (70%)		104	84		
94	GBR	Peter James Hallam	413	2020/2021 season (100%)					
94	GBR	Peter James Hallam	413	2019/2020 season (100%)				144	
94	GBR	Peter James Hallam	413	2018/2019 season (70%)				142	127
96	FIN	Valtter Virtanen	409	2020/2021 season (100%)					
96	FIN	Valtter Virtanen	409	2019/2020 season (100%)				182	
96	FIN	Valtter Virtanen	409	2018/2019 season (70%)				115	112
97	SVK	Michael Neuman	406	2020/2021 season (100%)					
97	SVK	Michael Neuman	406	2019/2020 season (100%)				164	
97	SVK	Michael Neuman	406	2018/2019 season (70%)				127	115
98	HKG	Harrison Jon-Yen Wong	400	2020/2021 season (100%)					
98	HKG	Harrison Jon-Yen Wong	400	2019/2020 season (100%)	92				
98	HKG	Harrison Jon-Yen Wong	400	2018/2019 season (70%)	71			125	112
99	CZE	Jiří Bělohradský	388	2020/2021 season (100%)					
99	CZE	Jiří Bělohradský	388	2019/2020 season (100%)				160	
99	CZE	Jiří Bělohradský	388	2018/2019 season (70%)				127	101
100	MON	Davide Lewton Brain	374	2020/2021 season (100%)					
100	MON	Davide Lewton Brain	374	2019/2020 season (100%)				164	
100	MON	Davide Lewton Brain	374	2018/2019 season (70%)	52			158	
101	AUS	James Min	371	2020/2021 season (100%)					
101	AUS	James Min	371	2019/2020 season (100%)	126			144	
101	AUS	James Min	371	2018/2019 season (70%)				101	
102	FRA	Adrien Tesson	363	2020/2021 season (100%)					
102	FRA	Adrien Tesson	363	2019/2020 season (100%)				203	160
102	FRA	Adrien Tesson	363	2018/2019 season (70%)					
103	CHN	Zhang He	358	2020/2021 season (100%)					
103	CHN	Zhang He	358	2019/2020 season (100%)	237				
103	CHN	Zhang He	358	2018/2019 season (70%)	121				
104	MEX	Donovan Carrillo	354	2020/2021 season (100%)	162				
104	MEX	Donovan Carrillo	354	2019/2020 season (100%)	192				
104	MEX	Donovan Carrillo	354	2018/2019 season (70%)	(109)				
105	THA	Micah Kai Lynette	350	2020/2021 season (100%)					
105	THA	Micah Kai Lynette	350	2019/2020 season (100%)	102			160	
105	THA	Micah Kai Lynette	350	2018/2019 season (70%)	88				
106	KOR	Byun Se-jong	348	2020/2021 season (100%)					
106	KOR	Byun Se-jong	348	2019/2020 season (100%)				178	
106	KOR	Byun Se-jong	348	2018/2019 season (70%)				170	
107	JPN	Sena Miyake	340	2020/2021 season (100%)					
107	JPN	Sena Miyake	340	2019/2020 season (100%)		97			
107	JPN	Sena Miyake	340	2018/2019 season (70%)		68		175	
108	AUS	Andrew Dodds	308	2020/2021 season (100%)					
108	AUS	Andrew Dodds	308	2019/2020 season (100%)					
108	AUS	Andrew Dodds	308	2018/2019 season (70%)	166			142	
109	RUS	Kirill Iakovlev	285	2020/2021 season (100%)					
109	RUS	Kirill Iakovlev	285	2019/2020 season (100%)					
109	RUS	Kirill Iakovlev	285	2018/2019 season (70%)		158	127		
110	RUS	Egor Rukhin	275	2020/2021 season (100%)					
110	RUS	Egor Rukhin	275	2019/2020 season (100%)		182			
110	RUS	Egor Rukhin	275	2018/2019 season (70%)		93			
111	HUN	Alexander Maszljanko	269	2020/2021 season (100%)					
111	HUN	Alexander Maszljanko	269	2019/2020 season (100%)					
111	HUN	Alexander Maszljanko	269	2018/2019 season (70%)				142	127
112	CRO	Jari Kessler	257	2020/2021 season (100%)					
112	CRO	Jari Kessler	257	2019/2020 season (100%)					
112	CRO	Jari Kessler	257	2018/2019 season (70%)				142	115
112	PHI	Edrian Paul Celestino	257	2020/2021 season (100%)					
112	PHI	Edrian Paul Celestino	257	2019/2020 season (100%)	113			144	
112	PHI	Edrian Paul Celestino	257	2018/2019 season (70%)					
114	CHN	Chen Yudong	256	2020/2021 season (100%)					
114	CHN	Chen Yudong	256	2019/2020 season (100%)		148	108		
114	CHN	Chen Yudong	256	2018/2019 season (70%)					
115	TPE	Micah Tang	242	2020/2021 season (100%)					
115	TPE	Micah Tang	242	2019/2020 season (100%)				144	
115	TPE	Micah Tang	242	2018/2019 season (70%)	98				
115	ROU	Catalin Dimitrescu	242	2020/2021 season (100%)					
115	ROU	Catalin Dimitrescu	242	2019/2020 season (100%)					
115	ROU	Catalin Dimitrescu	242	2018/2019 season (70%)				127	115
117	POL	Igor Reznichenko	230	2020/2021 season (100%)					
117	POL	Igor Reznichenko	230	2019/2020 season (100%)					
117	POL	Igor Reznichenko	230	2018/2019 season (70%)				115	115
118	UKR	Yaroslav Paniot	216	2020/2021 season (100%)					
118	UKR	Yaroslav Paniot	216	2019/2020 season (100%)					
118	UKR	Yaroslav Paniot	216	2018/2019 season (70%)				115	101
119	CZE	Petr Kotlařík	213	2020/2021 season (100%)					
119	CZE	Petr Kotlařík	213	2019/2020 season (100%)					
119	CZE	Petr Kotlařík	213	2018/2019 season (70%)				112	101
120	FRA	Philip Warren	203	2020/2021 season (100%)					
120	FRA	Philip Warren	203	2019/2020 season (100%)				203	
120	FRA	Philip Warren	203	2018/2019 season (70%)					
120	ITA	Mattia Dalla Torre	203	2020/2021 season (100%)					
120	ITA	Mattia Dalla Torre	203	2019/2020 season (100%)				203	
120	ITA	Mattia Dalla Torre	203	2018/2019 season (70%)					
120	RUS	Andrei Kutovoi	203	2020/2021 season (100%)					
120	RUS	Andrei Kutovoi	203	2019/2020 season (100%)		203			
120	RUS	Andrei Kutovoi	203	2018/2019 season (70%)					
123	GER	Thomas Stoll	202	2020/2021 season (100%)					
123	GER	Thomas Stoll	202	2019/2020 season (100%)					
123	GER	Thomas Stoll	202	2018/2019 season (70%)				101	101
124	RUS	Matvei Vetlugin	201	2020/2021 season (100%)					
124	RUS	Matvei Vetlugin	201	2019/2020 season (100%)		97			
124	RUS	Matvei Vetlugin	201	2018/2019 season (70%)		104			
125	KOR	Kyeong Jae-seok	196	2020/2021 season (100%)					
125	KOR	Kyeong Jae-seok	196	2019/2020 season (100%)		120			
125	KOR	Kyeong Jae-seok	196	2018/2019 season (70%)		76			
126	CAN	Beres Clements	192	2020/2021 season (100%)					
126	CAN	Beres Clements	192	2019/2020 season (100%)		108			
126	CAN	Beres Clements	192	2018/2019 season (70%)		84			
127	GER	Denis Gurdzhi	188	2020/2021 season (100%)					
127	GER	Denis Gurdzhi	188	2019/2020 season (100%)	68	120			
127	GER	Denis Gurdzhi	188	2018/2019 season (70%)					
128	KOR	An Geon-hyeong	183	2020/2021 season (100%)					
128	KOR	An Geon-hyeong	183	2019/2020 season (100%)					
128	KOR	An Geon-hyeong	183	2018/2019 season (70%)		115	68		
129	CAN	Alec Guinzbourg	182	2020/2021 season (100%)					
129	CAN	Alec Guinzbourg	182	2019/2020 season (100%)		182			
129	CAN	Alec Guinzbourg	182	2018/2019 season (70%)					
130	USA	Dinh Tran	176	2020/2021 season (100%)					
130	USA	Dinh Tran	176	2019/2020 season (100%)		108			
130	USA	Dinh Tran	176	2018/2019 season (70%)		68			
131	RUS	Alexander Petrov	175	2020/2021 season (100%)					
131	RUS	Alexander Petrov	175	2019/2020 season (100%)					
131	RUS	Alexander Petrov	175	2018/2019 season (70%)				175	
132	RUS	Artur Dmitriev	170	2020/2021 season (100%)					
132	RUS	Artur Dmitriev	170	2019/2020 season (100%)					
132	RUS	Artur Dmitriev	170	2018/2019 season (70%)				170	
133	FRA	Romain Ponsart	165	2020/2021 season (100%)					
133	FRA	Romain Ponsart	165	2019/2020 season (100%)					
133	FRA	Romain Ponsart	165	2018/2019 season (70%)		165			
134	GER	Kai Jagoda	164	2020/2021 season (100%)					
134	GER	Kai Jagoda	164	2019/2020 season (100%)				164	
134	GER	Kai Jagoda	164	2018/2019 season (70%)					
134	KAZ	Rakhat Bralin	164	2020/2021 season (100%)					
134	KAZ	Rakhat Bralin	164	2019/2020 season (100%)				164	
134	KAZ	Rakhat Bralin	164	2018/2019 season (70%)					
134	NED	Thomas Kennes	164	2020/2021 season (100%)					
134	NED	Thomas Kennes	164	2019/2020 season (100%)				164	
134	NED	Thomas Kennes	164	2018/2019 season (70%)					
134	SUI	Nurullah Sahaka	164	2020/2021 season (100%)					
134	SUI	Nurullah Sahaka	164	2019/2020 season (100%)				164	
134	SUI	Nurullah Sahaka	164	2018/2019 season (70%)					
138	CZE	Daniel Mrázek	158	2020/2021 season (100%)					
138	CZE	Daniel Mrázek	158	2019/2020 season (100%)					
138	CZE	Daniel Mrázek	158	2018/2019 season (70%)				158	
139	SWE	Andreas Nordebäck	152	2020/2021 season (100%)					
139	SWE	Andreas Nordebäck	152	2019/2020 season (100%)					
139	SWE	Andreas Nordebäck	152	2018/2019 season (70%)		76	76		
140	USA	Matthew Nielsen	148	2020/2021 season (100%)					
140	USA	Matthew Nielsen	148	2019/2020 season (100%)		148			
140	USA	Matthew Nielsen	148	2018/2019 season (70%)					
141	RUS	Artem Lezheev	139	2020/2021 season (100%)					
141	RUS	Artem Lezheev	139	2019/2020 season (100%)					
141	RUS	Artem Lezheev	139	2018/2019 season (70%)				139	
142	JPN	Kao Miura	133	2020/2021 season (100%)					
142	JPN	Kao Miura	133	2019/2020 season (100%)		133			
142	JPN	Kao Miura	133	2018/2019 season (70%)					
142	USA	Joseph Klein	133	2020/2021 season (100%)					
142	USA	Joseph Klein	133	2019/2020 season (100%)		133			
142	USA	Joseph Klein	133	2018/2019 season (70%)					
144	IRE	Conor Stakelum	127	2020/2021 season (100%)					
144	IRE	Conor Stakelum	127	2019/2020 season (100%)					
144	IRE	Conor Stakelum	127	2018/2019 season (70%)				127	
145	CAN	Bennet Toman	125	2020/2021 season (100%)					
145	CAN	Bennet Toman	125	2019/2020 season (100%)					
145	CAN	Bennet Toman	125	2018/2019 season (70%)				125	
145	JPN	Hiroaki Sato	125	2020/2021 season (100%)					
145	JPN	Hiroaki Sato	125	2019/2020 season (100%)					
145	JPN	Hiroaki Sato	125	2018/2019 season (70%)				125	
147	CAN	Eric Liu	120	2020/2021 season (100%)					
147	CAN	Eric Liu	120	2019/2020 season (100%)		120			
147	CAN	Eric Liu	120	2018/2019 season (70%)					
148	KOR	Park Sung-hoon	112	2020/2021 season (100%)					
148	KOR	Park Sung-hoon	112	2019/2020 season (100%)					
148	KOR	Park Sung-hoon	112	2018/2019 season (70%)				112	
148	RUS	Alexey Erokhov	112	2020/2021 season (100%)					
148	RUS	Alexey Erokhov	112	2019/2020 season (100%)					
148	RUS	Alexey Erokhov	112	2018/2019 season (70%)				112	
148	USA	Sean Rabbitt	112	2020/2021 season (100%)					
148	USA	Sean Rabbitt	112	2019/2020 season (100%)					
148	USA	Sean Rabbitt	112	2018/2019 season (70%)				112	
151	CHN	Li Luanfeng	108	2020/2021 season (100%)					
151	CHN	Li Luanfeng	108	2019/2020 season (100%)		108			
151	CHN	Li Luanfeng	108	2018/2019 season (70%)					
151	GBR	Edward Appleby	108	2020/2021 season (100%)					
151	GBR	Edward Appleby	108	2019/2020 season (100%)		108			
151	GBR	Edward Appleby	108	2018/2019 season (70%)					
153	CAN	Corey Circelli	97	2020/2021 season (100%)					
153	CAN	Corey Circelli	97	2019/2020 season (100%)		97			
153	CAN	Corey Circelli	97	2018/2019 season (70%)					
154	JPN	Tatsuya Tsuboi	89	2020/2021 season (100%)					
154	JPN	Tatsuya Tsuboi	89	2019/2020 season (100%)					
154	JPN	Tatsuya Tsuboi	89	2018/2019 season (70%)	89				
155	CZE	Radek Jakubka	84	2020/2021 season (100%)					
155	CZE	Radek Jakubka	84	2019/2020 season (100%)					
155	CZE	Radek Jakubka	84	2018/2019 season (70%)		84			
156	GEO	Nika Egadze	83	2020/2021 season (100%)					
156	GEO	Nika Egadze	83	2019/2020 season (100%)	83				
156	GEO	Nika Egadze	83	2018/2019 season (70%)					
157	AUS	Jordan Dodds	74	2020/2021 season (100%)					
157	AUS	Jordan Dodds	74	2019/2020 season (100%)	74				
157	AUS	Jordan Dodds	74	2018/2019 season (70%)					
158	HKG	Leslie Man Cheuk Ip	64	2020/2021 season (100%)					
158	HKG	Leslie Man Cheuk Ip	64	2019/2020 season (100%)					
158	HKG	Leslie Man Cheuk Ip	64	2018/2019 season (70%)	64				
159	KAZ	Nikita Manko	58	2020/2021 season (100%)					
159	KAZ	Nikita Manko	58	2019/2020 season (100%)					
159	KAZ	Nikita Manko	58	2018/2019 season (70%)	58				
160	KAZ	Mikhail Shaidorov	55	2020/2021 season (100%)					
160	KAZ	Mikhail Shaidorov	55	2019/2020 season (100%)	55				
160	KAZ	Mikhail Shaidorov	55	2018/2019 season (70%)					
161	AUS	Mark Webster	52	2020/2021 season (100%)					
161	AUS	Mark Webster	52	2019/2020 season (100%)					
161	AUS	Mark Webster	52	2018/2019 season (70%)	52				
162	CZE	Filip Scerba	44	2020/2021 season (100%)					
162	CZE	Filip Scerba	44	2019/2020 season (100%)	44				
162	CZE	Filip Scerba	44	2018/2019 season (70%)					
163	GER	Nikita Starostin	31	2020/2021 season (100%)					
163	GER	Nikita Starostin	31	2019/2020 season (100%)					
163	GER	Nikita Starostin	31	2018/2019 season (70%)	31				

==== Ladies ====
As of March 26, 2021.

Rank	Nation	Skater	Points	Season	ISU Championships or Olympics	(Junior) Grand Prix and Final		Selected International Competition	
Rank	Nation	Skater	Points	Season	Best	Best	2nd Best	Best	2nd Best
1	JPN	Rika Kihira	4196	2020/2021 season (100%)	638				
1	JPN	Rika Kihira	4196	2019/2020 season (100%)	840	583	360	300	250
1	JPN	Rika Kihira	4196	2018/2019 season (70%)	(613)	560	280	210	175
2	RUS	Anna Shcherbakova	3726	2020/2021 season (100%)	1200				
2	RUS	Anna Shcherbakova	3726	2019/2020 season (100%)	756	720	400	300	
2	RUS	Anna Shcherbakova	3726	2018/2019 season (70%)	(315)	175	175		
3	RUS	Elizaveta Tuktamysheva	3452	2020/2021 season (100%)	1080				
3	RUS	Elizaveta Tuktamysheva	3452	2019/2020 season (100%)		324	324	300	270
3	RUS	Elizaveta Tuktamysheva	3452	2018/2019 season (70%)		454	280	210	210
4	RUS	Alexandra Trusova	3396	2020/2021 season (100%)	972				
4	RUS	Alexandra Trusova	3396	2019/2020 season (100%)	680	648	400	300	
4	RUS	Alexandra Trusova	3396	2018/2019 season (70%)	(350)	221	175		
5	USA	Bradie Tennell	3203	2020/2021 season (100%)	517				
5	USA	Bradie Tennell	3203	2019/2020 season (100%)	680	525	360	270	
5	USA	Bradie Tennell	3203	2018/2019 season (70%)	(447)	227	204	210	210
6	JPN	Kaori Sakamoto	2927	2020/2021 season (100%)	709				
6	JPN	Kaori Sakamoto	2927	2019/2020 season (100%)	551	292	292	270	
6	JPN	Kaori Sakamoto	2927	2018/2019 season (70%)	(551)	408	252	153	
7	JPN	Satoko Miyahara	2873	2020/2021 season (100%)	180				
7	JPN	Satoko Miyahara	2873	2019/2020 season (100%)		360	292	300	250
7	JPN	Satoko Miyahara	2873	2018/2019 season (70%)	496	330	280	210	175
8	RUS	Alena Kostornaia	2760	2020/2021 season (100%)					
8	RUS	Alena Kostornaia	2760	2019/2020 season (100%)	840	800	400	300	
8	RUS	Alena Kostornaia	2760	2018/2019 season (70%)		245	175		
9	RUS	Alina Zagitova	2666	2020/2021 season (100%)					
9	RUS	Alina Zagitova	2666	2019/2020 season (100%)		472	360		
9	RUS	Alina Zagitova	2666	2018/2019 season (70%)	840	504	280	210	
10	KOR	Lim Eun-soo	2537	2020/2021 season (100%)					
10	KOR	Lim Eun-soo	2537	2019/2020 season (100%)	402	262	213	300	243
10	KOR	Lim Eun-soo	2537	2018/2019 season (70%)	326	227	165	210	189
11	RUS	Sofia Samodurova	2414	2020/2021 season (100%)					
11	RUS	Sofia Samodurova	2414	2019/2020 season (100%)		262	236	300	219
11	RUS	Sofia Samodurova	2414	2018/2019 season (70%)	588	368	252	189	
12	KOR	You Young	2368	2020/2021 season (100%)					
12	KOR	You Young	2368	2019/2020 season (100%)	756	324	292	270	250
12	KOR	You Young	2368	2018/2019 season (70%)	207	142	127		
13	RUS	Evgenia Medvedeva	2192	2020/2021 season (100%)					
13	RUS	Evgenia Medvedeva	2192	2019/2020 season (100%)		360	262	270	
13	RUS	Evgenia Medvedeva	2192	2018/2019 season (70%)	680	227	204	189	
14	AZE	Ekaterina Ryabova	2111	2020/2021 season (100%)	377				
14	AZE	Ekaterina Ryabova	2111	2019/2020 season (100%)	496	262		243	225
14	AZE	Ekaterina Ryabova	2111	2018/2019 season (70%)	(237)	104	104	175	125
15	KOR	Kim Ye-lim	2102	2020/2021 season (100%)	418				
15	KOR	Kim Ye-lim	2102	2019/2020 season (100%)	496	213		270	219
15	KOR	Kim Ye-lim	2102	2018/2019 season (70%)	(281)	158	158	170	
16	USA	Mariah Bell	2020	2020/2021 season (100%)					
16	USA	Mariah Bell	2020	2019/2020 season (100%)		324	324	300	
16	USA	Mariah Bell	2020	2018/2019 season (70%)	362	204	183	170	153
17	USA	Karen Chen	1956	2020/2021 season (100%)	875				
17	USA	Karen Chen	1956	2019/2020 season (100%)	446	191		225	219
17	USA	Karen Chen	1956	2018/2019 season (70%)					
18	SUI	Alexia Paganini	1830	2020/2021 season (100%)					
18	SUI	Alexia Paganini	1830	2019/2020 season (100%)	612	213		178	
18	SUI	Alexia Paganini	1830	2018/2019 season (70%)	347	204		175	101
19	JPN	Wakaba Higuchi	1674	2020/2021 season (100%)					
19	JPN	Wakaba Higuchi	1674	2019/2020 season (100%)	612	236	236	144	
19	JPN	Wakaba Higuchi	1674	2018/2019 season (70%)		165		142	139
20	EST	Eva-Lotta Kiibus	1582	2020/2021 season (100%)	305				
20	EST	Eva-Lotta Kiibus	1582	2019/2020 season (100%)	446	133	120	225	178
20	EST	Eva-Lotta Kiibus	1582	2018/2019 season (70%)	(92)			175	
21	KOR	Lee Hae-in	1562	2020/2021 season (100%)	465				
21	KOR	Lee Hae-in	1562	2019/2020 season (100%)	328	250	250		
21	KOR	Lee Hae-in	1562	2018/2019 season (70%)	(167)	142	127		
22	USA	Starr Andrews	1553	2020/2021 season (100%)					
22	USA	Starr Andrews	1553	2019/2020 season (100%)	239	262	191	198	198
22	USA	Starr Andrews	1553	2018/2019 season (70%)		149		158	158
23	KAZ	Elizabet Tursynbaeva	1482	2020/2021 season (100%)					
23	KAZ	Elizabet Tursynbaeva	1482	2019/2020 season (100%)					
23	KAZ	Elizabet Tursynbaeva	1482	2018/2019 season (70%)	756	183	165	189	189
24	GER	Nicole Schott	1452	2020/2021 season (100%)	200				
24	GER	Nicole Schott	1452	2019/2020 season (100%)	237	213		243	243
24	GER	Nicole Schott	1452	2018/2019 season (70%)	(173)			158	158
25	BEL	Loena Hendrickx	2404	2020/2021 season (100%)	787				
25	BEL	Loena Hendrickx	2404	2019/2020 season (100%)					
25	BEL	Loena Hendrickx	2404	2018/2019 season (70%)	264	183		170	
26	JPN	Yuhana Yokoi	1393	2020/2021 season (100%)					
26	JPN	Yuhana Yokoi	1393	2019/2020 season (100%)		292	236	243	225
26	JPN	Yuhana Yokoi	1393	2018/2019 season (70%)	151	142	104		
27	FIN	Emmi Peltonen	1378	2020/2021 season (100%)					
27	FIN	Emmi Peltonen	1378	2019/2020 season (100%)	551			225	182
27	FIN	Emmi Peltonen	1378	2018/2019 season (70%)	281			139	
28	BUL	Alexandra Feigin	1361	2020/2021 season (100%)	222				
28	BUL	Alexandra Feigin	1361	2019/2020 season (100%)	156			250	250
28	BUL	Alexandra Feigin	1361	2018/2019 season (70%)	205	84		175	175
29	RUS	Stanislava Konstantinova	1346	2020/2021 season (100%)					
29	RUS	Stanislava Konstantinova	1346	2019/2020 season (100%)				160	
29	RUS	Stanislava Konstantinova	1346	2018/2019 season (70%)	428	252	183	170	153
30	USA	Amber Glenn	1306	2020/2021 season (100%)					
30	USA	Amber Glenn	1306	2019/2020 season (100%)	362	236	213	243	
30	USA	Amber Glenn	1306	2018/2019 season (70%)				127	125
31	JPN	Marin Honda	1296	2020/2021 season (100%)					
31	JPN	Marin Honda	1296	2019/2020 season (100%)		236	213	225	198
31	JPN	Marin Honda	1296	2018/2019 season (70%)		165	134	125	
32	FRA	Maé-Bérénice Méité	1253	2020/2021 season (100%)					
32	FRA	Maé-Bérénice Méité	1253	2019/2020 season (100%)	362			160	
32	FRA	Maé-Bérénice Méité	1253	2018/2019 season (70%)	312	134		170	115
33	AUT	Olga Mikutina	1199	2020/2021 season (100%)	574				
33	AUT	Olga Mikutina	1199	2019/2020 season (100%)	74			250	225
33	AUT	Olga Mikutina	1199	2018/2019 season (70%)	(58)	76			
34	ITA	Alessia Tornaghi	1182	2020/2021 season (100%)					
34	ITA	Alessia Tornaghi	1182	2019/2020 season (100%)	402	203	108	250	219
34	ITA	Alessia Tornaghi	1182	2018/2019 season (70%)					
35	JPN	Mako Yamashita	1181	2020/2021 season (100%)					
35	JPN	Mako Yamashita	1181	2019/2020 season (100%)		262		178	
35	JPN	Mako Yamashita	1181	2018/2019 season (70%)		252	149	170	170
36	POL	Ekaterina Kurakova	1172	2020/2021 season (100%)					
36	POL	Ekaterina Kurakova	1172	2019/2020 season (100%)	325	164	133	300	250
36	POL	Ekaterina Kurakova	1172	2018/2019 season (70%)					
37	GEO	Alina Urushadze	1154	2020/2021 season (100%)	162				
37	GEO	Alina Urushadze	1154	2019/2020 season (100%)	192	148	120	225	203
37	GEO	Alina Urushadze	1154	2018/2019 season (70%)	(122)	104			
38	HKG	Yi Christy Leung	1129	2020/2021 season (100%)					
38	HKG	Yi Christy Leung	1129	2019/2020 season (100%)		191		198	
38	HKG	Yi Christy Leung	1129	2018/2019 season (70%)	214	127	93	153	153
39	AUS	Kailani Craine	1126	2020/2021 season (100%)					
39	AUS	Kailani Craine	1126	2019/2020 season (100%)	264			219	198
39	AUS	Kailani Craine	1126	2018/2019 season (70%)	134			158	153
40	JPN	Mai Mihara	1121	2020/2021 season (100%)					
40	JPN	Mai Mihara	1121	2019/2020 season (100%)					
40	JPN	Mai Mihara	1121	2018/2019 season (70%)	476	252	204	189	
41	RUS	Kamila Valieva	1100	2020/2021 season (100%)					
41	RUS	Kamila Valieva	1100	2019/2020 season (100%)	500	350	250		
41	RUS	Kamila Valieva	1100	2018/2019 season (70%)					
42	CZE	Eliška Březinová	1061	2020/2021 season (100%)	131				
42	CZE	Eliška Březinová	1061	2019/2020 season (100%)	(92)			203	182
42	CZE	Eliška Březinová	1061	2018/2019 season (70%)	228			175	142
43	RUS	Serafima Sakhanovich	1059	2020/2021 season (100%)					
43	RUS	Serafima Sakhanovich	1059	2019/2020 season (100%)		191		250	219
43	RUS	Serafima Sakhanovich	1059	2018/2019 season (70%)				210	189
44	ITA	Lara Naki Gutmann	1029	2020/2021 season (100%)					
44	ITA	Lara Naki Gutmann	1029	2019/2020 season (100%)		148	133	250	225
44	ITA	Lara Naki Gutmann	1029	2018/2019 season (70%)				158	115
45	USA	Alysa Liu	970	2020/2021 season (100%)					
45	USA	Alysa Liu	970	2019/2020 season (100%)	405	315	250		
45	USA	Alysa Liu	970	2018/2019 season (70%)					
46	RUS	Daria Usacheva	959	2020/2021 season (100%)					
46	RUS	Daria Usacheva	959	2019/2020 season (100%)	450	284	225		
46	RUS	Daria Usacheva	959	2018/2019 season (70%)					
47	KOR	Wi Seo-yeong	956	2020/2021 season (100%)					
47	KOR	Wi Seo-yeong	956	2019/2020 season (100%)	295	225	182		
47	KOR	Wi Seo-yeong	956	2018/2019 season (70%)		127	127		
48	CHN	Chen Hongyi	955	2020/2021 season (100%)	(146)				
48	CHN	Chen Hongyi	955	2019/2020 season (100%)	293	191			
48	CHN	Chen Hongyi	955	2018/2019 season (70%)	150	84		125	112
49	FIN	Viveca Lindfors	950	2020/2021 season (100%)					
49	FIN	Viveca Lindfors	950	2019/2020 season (100%)					
49	FIN	Viveca Lindfors	950	2018/2019 season (70%)	476	134		170	170
50	JPN	Yuna Shiraiwa	945	2020/2021 season (100%)					
50	JPN	Yuna Shiraiwa	945	2019/2020 season (100%)					
50	JPN	Yuna Shiraiwa	945	2018/2019 season (70%)	230	204	183	189	139
51	HUN	Ivett Tóth	944	2020/2021 season (100%)					
51	HUN	Ivett Tóth	944	2019/2020 season (100%)	102			182	144
51	HUN	Ivett Tóth	944	2018/2019 season (70%)	166			175	175
52	SUI	Yasmine Kimiko Yamada	942	2020/2021 season (100%)					
52	SUI	Yasmine Kimiko Yamada	942	2019/2020 season (100%)	126			203	203
52	SUI	Yasmine Kimiko Yamada	942	2018/2019 season (70%)	134			175	101
53	SLO	Daša Grm	942	2020/2021 season (100%)					
53	SLO	Daša Grm	942	2019/2020 season (100%)	113			225	203
53	SLO	Daša Grm	942	2018/2019 season (70%)	140			127	115
54	RUS	Ksenia Sinitsyna	942	2020/2021 season (100%)					
54	RUS	Ksenia Sinitsyna	942	2019/2020 season (100%)		255	250		
54	RUS	Ksenia Sinitsyna	942	2018/2019 season (70%)	256	142			
55	USA	Ting Cui	900	2020/2021 season (100%)					
55	USA	Ting Cui	900	2019/2020 season (100%)				219	
55	USA	Ting Cui	900	2018/2019 season (70%)	284	115	93	189	
56	FIN	Linnea Ceder	889	2020/2021 season (100%)					
56	FIN	Linnea Ceder	889	2019/2020 season (100%)	264	120		203	160
56	FIN	Linnea Ceder	889	2018/2019 season (70%)				142	
57	FRA	Laurine Lecavelier	883	2020/2021 season (100%)					
57	FRA	Laurine Lecavelier	883	2019/2020 season (100%)					
57	FRA	Laurine Lecavelier	883	2018/2019 season (70%)	386	183		175	139
58	FIN	Jenni Saarinen	861	2020/2021 season (100%)	106				
58	FIN	Jenni Saarinen	861	2019/2020 season (100%)				219	203
58	FIN	Jenni Saarinen	861	2018/2019 season (70%)				175	158
59	KOR	Kim Ha-nul	855	2020/2021 season (100%)					
59	KOR	Kim Ha-nul	855	2019/2020 season (100%)				270	270
59	KOR	Kim Ha-nul	855	2018/2019 season (70%)	166	149			
60	USA	Gabriella Izzo	826	2020/2021 season (100%)					
60	USA	Gabriella Izzo	826	2019/2020 season (100%)		120	108	243	
60	USA	Gabriella Izzo	826	2018/2019 season (70%)		104	76	175	
61	RUS	Anastasiia Guliakova	825	2020/2021 season (100%)					
61	RUS	Anastasiia Guliakova	825	2019/2020 season (100%)				250	225
61	RUS	Anastasiia Guliakova	825	2018/2019 season (70%)				175	175
62	GBR	Natasha McKay	823	2020/2021 season (100%)	118				
62	GBR	Natasha McKay	823	2019/2020 season (100%)	(83)			225	203
62	GBR	Natasha McKay	823	2018/2019 season (70%)	102			175	
63	JPN	Tomoe Kawabata	795	2020/2021 season (100%)					
63	JPN	Tomoe Kawabata	795	2019/2020 season (100%)	127	164	164		
63	JPN	Tomoe Kawabata	795	2018/2019 season (70%)	110	115	115		
64	ARM	Anastasiya Galustyan	786	2020/2021 season (100%)					
64	ARM	Anastasiya Galustyan	786	2019/2020 season (100%)				250	203
64	ARM	Anastasiya Galustyan	786	2018/2019 season (70%)	64			142	127
65	RUS	Anastasia Tarakanova	760	2020/2021 season (100%)					
65	RUS	Anastasia Tarakanova	760	2019/2020 season (100%)		203	203		
65	RUS	Anastasia Tarakanova	760	2018/2019 season (70%)		179	175		
66	SWE	Josefin Taljegård	755	2020/2021 season (100%)	275				
66	SWE	Josefin Taljegård	755	2019/2020 season (100%)				178	
66	SWE	Josefin Taljegård	755	2018/2019 season (70%)				175	127
67	RUS	Maiia Khromykh	750	2020/2021 season (100%)					
67	RUS	Maiia Khromykh	750	2019/2020 season (100%)	365	203	182		
67	RUS	Maiia Khromykh	750	2018/2019 season (70%)					
68	BLR	Viktoriia Safonova	734	2020/2021 season (100%)					
68	BLR	Viktoriia Safonova	734	2019/2020 season (100%)	214			270	250
68	BLR	Viktoriia Safonova	734	2018/2019 season (70%)					
69	HUN	Júlia Láng	734	2020/2021 season (100%)					
69	HUN	Júlia Láng	734	2019/2020 season (100%)		97		250	225
69	HUN	Júlia Láng	734	2018/2019 season (70%)	89	68			
70	CAN	Alison Schumacher	704	2020/2021 season (100%)					
70	CAN	Alison Schumacher	704	2019/2020 season (100%)	215	133		144	
70	CAN	Alison Schumacher	704	2018/2019 season (70%)	136	76			
71	ITA	Chenny Paolucci	669	2020/2021 season (100%)					
71	ITA	Chenny Paolucci	669	2019/2020 season (100%)				203	182
71	ITA	Chenny Paolucci	669	2018/2019 season (70%)				142	142
72	ITA	Lucrezia Beccari	665	2020/2021 season (100%)					
72	ITA	Lucrezia Beccari	665	2019/2020 season (100%)				250	250
72	ITA	Lucrezia Beccari	665	2018/2019 season (70%)	72	93			
73	SWE	Anita Östlund	655	2020/2021 season (100%)					
73	SWE	Anita Östlund	655	2019/2020 season (100%)	140			144	
73	SWE	Anita Östlund	655	2018/2019 season (70%)	98			158	115
74	FRA	Léa Serna	637	2020/2021 season (100%)					
74	FRA	Léa Serna	637	2019/2020 season (100%)	173	191			
74	FRA	Léa Serna	637	2018/2019 season (70%)				158	115
75	FRA	Maïa Mazzara	633	2020/2021 season (100%)					
75	FRA	Maïa Mazzara	633	2019/2020 season (100%)	293	108		164	
75	FRA	Maïa Mazzara	633	2018/2019 season (70%)		68			
76	USA	Hanna Harrell	615	2020/2021 season (100%)					
76	USA	Hanna Harrell	615	2019/2020 season (100%)		133		203	
76	USA	Hanna Harrell	615	2018/2019 season (70%)	186	93			
77	CAN	Alicia Pineault	610	2020/2021 season (100%)					
77	CAN	Alicia Pineault	610	2019/2020 season (100%)	325			160	
77	CAN	Alicia Pineault	610	2018/2019 season (70%)				125	
78	AUT	Sophia Schaller	609	2020/2021 season (100%)					
78	AUT	Sophia Schaller	609	2019/2020 season (100%)				203	164
78	AUT	Sophia Schaller	609	2018/2019 season (70%)				127	115
78	ITA	Lucrezia Gennaro	609	2020/2021 season (100%)					
78	ITA	Lucrezia Gennaro	609	2019/2020 season (100%)		108	97		
78	ITA	Lucrezia Gennaro	609	2018/2019 season (70%)	88			158	158
80	JPN	Nana Araki	594	2020/2021 season (100%)					
80	JPN	Nana Araki	594	2019/2020 season (100%)		182	182		
80	JPN	Nana Araki	594	2018/2019 season (70%)		115	115		
81	USA	Megan Wessenberg	615	2020/2021 season (100%)					
81	USA	Megan Wessenberg	615	2019/2020 season (100%)				164	144
81	USA	Megan Wessenberg	615	2018/2019 season (70%)		165		112	
82	RUS	Viktoria Vasilieva	574	2020/2021 season (100%)					
82	RUS	Viktoria Vasilieva	574	2019/2020 season (100%)		225	207		
82	RUS	Viktoria Vasilieva	574	2018/2019 season (70%)		142			
83	PHI	Alisson Krystle Perticheto	571	2020/2021 season (100%)					
83	PHI	Alisson Krystle Perticheto	571	2019/2020 season (100%)	140				
83	PHI	Alisson Krystle Perticheto	571	2018/2019 season (70%)	98			175	158
84	BRA	Isadora Williams	546	2020/2021 season (100%)					
84	BRA	Isadora Williams	546	2019/2020 season (100%)				164	
84	BRA	Isadora Williams	546	2018/2019 season (70%)	109			158	115
85	CAN	Madeline Schizas	542	2020/2021 season (100%)	339				
85	CAN	Madeline Schizas	542	2019/2020 season (100%)				203	
85	CAN	Madeline Schizas	542	2018/2019 season (70%)					
86	RUS	Anna Tarusina	526	2020/2021 season (100%)					
86	RUS	Anna Tarusina	526	2019/2020 season (100%)					
86	RUS	Anna Tarusina	526	2018/2019 season (70%)		158	158	210	
87	JPN	Mana Kawabe	520	2020/2021 season (100%)					
87	JPN	Mana Kawabe	520	2019/2020 season (100%)	174	182	164		
87	JPN	Mana Kawabe	520	2018/2019 season (70%)					
88	CAN	Emily Bausback	518	2020/2021 season (100%)					
88	CAN	Emily Bausback	518	2019/2020 season (100%)	192	148		178	
88	CAN	Emily Bausback	518	2018/2019 season (70%)					
89	ITA	Roberta Rodeghiero	502	2020/2021 season (100%)					
89	ITA	Roberta Rodeghiero	502	2019/2020 season (100%)				250	
89	ITA	Roberta Rodeghiero	502	2018/2019 season (70%)				127	125
90	SRB	Antonina Dubinina	488	2020/2021 season (100%)					
90	SRB	Antonina Dubinina	488	2019/2020 season (100%)				182	
90	SRB	Antonina Dubinina	488	2018/2019 season (70%)	52			127	127
91	ITA	Marina Piredda	477	2020/2021 season (100%)					
91	ITA	Marina Piredda	477	2019/2020 season (100%)				160	
91	ITA	Marina Piredda	477	2018/2019 season (70%)				175	142
92	EST	Gerli Liinamäe	467	2020/2021 season (100%)					
92	EST	Gerli Liinamäe	467	2019/2020 season (100%)				182	
92	EST	Gerli Liinamäe	467	2018/2019 season (70%)				158	127
92	ITA	Elettra Maria Olivotto	467	2020/2021 season (100%)					
92	ITA	Elettra Maria Olivotto	467	2019/2020 season (100%)				182	
92	ITA	Elettra Maria Olivotto	467	2018/2019 season (70%)				158	127
94	LTU	Greta Morkytė	461	2020/2021 season (100%)					
94	LTU	Greta Morkytė	461	2019/2020 season (100%)				182	164
94	LTU	Greta Morkytė	461	2018/2019 season (70%)				115	
95	MEX	Andrea Montesinos Cantú	450	2020/2021 season (100%)					
95	MEX	Andrea Montesinos Cantú	450	2019/2020 season (100%)	173			198	
95	MEX	Andrea Montesinos Cantú	450	2018/2019 season (70%)	79				
96	RUS	Polina Tsurskaya	436	2020/2021 season (100%)					
96	RUS	Polina Tsurskaya	436	2019/2020 season (100%)					
96	RUS	Polina Tsurskaya	436	2018/2019 season (70%)		149	134	153	
97	GBR	Karly Robertson	434	2020/2021 season (100%)					
97	GBR	Karly Robertson	434	2019/2020 season (100%)				164	
97	GBR	Karly Robertson	434	2018/2019 season (70%)				158	112
98	RUS	Anna Frolova	428	2020/2021 season (100%)					
98	RUS	Anna Frolova	428	2019/2020 season (100%)		225	203		
98	RUS	Anna Frolova	428	2018/2019 season (70%)					
99	BUL	Maria Levushkina	426	2020/2021 season (100%)					
99	BUL	Maria Levushkina	426	2019/2020 season (100%)	49	133	108		
99	BUL	Maria Levushkina	426	2018/2019 season (70%)		68	68		
100	ROU	Julia Sauter	423	2020/2021 season (100%)					
100	ROU	Julia Sauter	423	2019/2020 season (100%)					
100	ROU	Julia Sauter	423	2018/2019 season (70%)	150			158	115
101	CAN	Gabrielle Daleman	418	2020/2021 season (100%)					
101	CAN	Gabrielle Daleman	418	2019/2020 season (100%)					
101	CAN	Gabrielle Daleman	418	2018/2019 season (70%)	293			125	
102	TUR	Sinem Pekder	406	2020/2021 season (100%)					
102	TUR	Sinem Pekder	406	2019/2020 season (100%)				164	
102	TUR	Sinem Pekder	406	2018/2019 season (70%)				127	115
103	JPN	Rion Sumiyoshi	389	2020/2021 season (100%)					
103	JPN	Rion Sumiyoshi	389	2019/2020 season (100%)		120			
103	JPN	Rion Sumiyoshi	389	2018/2019 season (70%)		142	127		
103	KOR	Park Yeon-jeong	389	2020/2021 season (100%)					
103	KOR	Park Yeon-jeong	389	2019/2020 season (100%)		225	164		
103	KOR	Park Yeon-jeong	389	2018/2019 season (70%)					
105	LAT	Angelīna Kučvaļska	380	2020/2021 season (100%)					
105	LAT	Angelīna Kučvaļska	380	2019/2020 season (100%)				198	182
105	LAT	Angelīna Kučvaļska	380	2018/2019 season (70%)					
105	SVK	Nicole Rajičová	380	2020/2021 season (100%)					
105	SVK	Nicole Rajičová	380	2019/2020 season (100%)					
105	SVK	Nicole Rajičová	380	2018/2019 season (70%)	253			127	
107	CAN	Véronik Mallet	378	2020/2021 season (100%)					
107	CAN	Véronik Mallet	378	2019/2020 season (100%)					
107	CAN	Véronik Mallet	378	2018/2019 season (70%)	253			125	
108	POL	Elżbieta Gabryszak	367	2020/2021 season (100%)					
108	POL	Elżbieta Gabryszak	367	2019/2020 season (100%)				225	
108	POL	Elżbieta Gabryszak	367	2018/2019 season (70%)				142	'
109	AUT	Stefanie Pesendorfer	364	2020/2021 season (100%)					
109	AUT	Stefanie Pesendorfer	364	2019/2020 season (100%)	114			250	
109	AUT	Stefanie Pesendorfer	364	2018/2019 season (70%)					
110	RUS	Alena Kanysheva	357	2020/2021 season (100%)					
110	RUS	Alena Kanysheva	357	2019/2020 season (100%)					
110	RUS	Alena Kanysheva	357	2018/2019 season (70%)		199	158		
111	CAN	Alaine Chartrand	356	2020/2021 season (100%)					
111	CAN	Alaine Chartrand	356	2019/2020 season (100%)					
111	CAN	Alaine Chartrand	356	2018/2019 season (70%)	121	134		101	
112	FIN	Vera Stolt	352	2020/2021 season (100%)					
112	FIN	Vera Stolt	352	2019/2020 season (100%)					
112	FIN	Vera Stolt	352	2018/2019 season (70%)		68		142	142
113	NED	Niki Wories	345	2020/2021 season (100%)					
113	NED	Niki Wories	345	2019/2020 season (100%)				203	
113	NED	Niki Wories	345	2018/2019 season (70%)				142	
114	KOR	Choi Da-bin	342	2020/2021 season (100%)					
114	KOR	Choi Da-bin	342	2019/2020 season (100%)				182	160
114	KOR	Choi Da-bin	342	2018/2019 season (70%)					
114	RUS	Anastasiia Gubanova	342	2020/2021 season (100%)					
114	RUS	Anastasiia Gubanova	342	2019/2020 season (100%)					
114	RUS	Anastasiia Gubanova	342	2018/2019 season (70%)				189	153
116	KOR	Ji Seo-yeon	330	2020/2021 season (100%)					
116	KOR	Ji Seo-yeon	330	2019/2020 season (100%)		182	148		
116	KOR	Ji Seo-yeon	330	2018/2019 season (70%)					
117	JPN	Chisato Uramatsu	328	2020/2021 season (100%)					
117	JPN	Chisato Uramatsu	328	2019/2020 season (100%)		164	164		
117	JPN	Chisato Uramatsu	328	2018/2019 season (70%)					
118	RUS	Anastasia Kolomiets	322	2020/2021 season (100%)					
118	RUS	Anastasia Kolomiets	322	2019/2020 season (100%)				164	
118	RUS	Anastasia Kolomiets	322	2018/2019 season (70%)				158	
119	ISR	Alina Iushchenkova	318	2020/2021 season (100%)					
119	ISR	Alina Iushchenkova	318	2019/2020 season (100%)				203	
119	ISR	Alina Iushchenkova	318	2018/2019 season (70%)				115	
120	KOR	To Ji-hun	316	2020/2021 season (100%)					
120	KOR	To Ji-hun	316	2019/2020 season (100%)		108			
120	KOR	To Ji-hun	316	2018/2019 season (70%)		115	93		
121	USA	Katie McBeath	357	2020/2021 season (100%)					
121	USA	Katie McBeath	357	2019/2020 season (100%)					
121	USA	Katie McBeath	357	2018/2019 season (70%)				175	139
122	TPE	Amy Lin	313	2020/2021 season (100%)					
122	TPE	Amy Lin	313	2019/2020 season (100%)	113				
122	TPE	Amy Lin	313	2018/2019 season (70%)	88			112	
123	FIN	Laura Karhunen	309	2020/2021 season (100%)					
123	FIN	Laura Karhunen	309	2019/2020 season (100%)				182	
123	FIN	Laura Karhunen	309	2018/2019 season (70%)				127	
124	ISR	Taylor Morris	308	2020/2021 season (100%)					
124	ISR	Taylor Morris	308	2019/2020 season (100%)				164	144
124	ISR	Taylor Morris	308	2018/2019 season (70%)					
125	RUS	Daria Panenkova	304	2020/2021 season (100%)					
125	RUS	Daria Panenkova	304	2019/2020 season (100%)					
125	RUS	Daria Panenkova	304	2018/2019 season (70%)		165		139	
126	CHN	Lin Shan	292	2020/2021 season (100%)					
126	CHN	Lin Shan	292	2019/2020 season (100%)					
126	CHN	Lin Shan	292	2018/2019 season (70%)				153	139
127	NOR	Marianne Stålen	291	2020/2021 season (100%)					
127	NOR	Marianne Stålen	291	2019/2020 season (100%)				164	
127	NOR	Marianne Stålen	291	2018/2019 season (70%)				127	
128	AZE	Morgan Flood	284	2020/2021 season (100%)					
128	AZE	Morgan Flood	284	2019/2020 season (100%)					
128	AZE	Morgan Flood	284	2018/2019 season (70%)				142	142
128	ITA	Sara Conti	284	2020/2021 season (100%)					
128	ITA	Sara Conti	284	2019/2020 season (100%)					
128	ITA	Sara Conti	284	2018/2019 season (70%)				142	142
130	USA	Isabelle Inthisone	279	2020/2021 season (100%)					
130	USA	Isabelle Inthisone	279	2019/2020 season (100%)		182	97		
130	USA	Isabelle Inthisone	279	2018/2019 season (70%)					
131	FRA	Anna Kuzmenko	268	2020/2021 season (100%)					
131	FRA	Anna Kuzmenko	268	2019/2020 season (100%)					
131	FRA	Anna Kuzmenko	268	2018/2019 season (70%)	80	104	84		
132	HKG	Hiu Ching Kwong	261	2020/2021 season (100%)					
132	HKG	Hiu Ching Kwong	261	2019/2020 season (100%)				160	
132	HKG	Hiu Ching Kwong	261	2018/2019 season (70%)				101	
133	KAZ	Aiza Mambekova	260	2020/2021 season (100%)					
133	KAZ	Aiza Mambekova	260	2019/2020 season (100%)	102				
133	KAZ	Aiza Mambekova	260	2018/2019 season (70%)				158	
134	SWE	Matilda Algotsson	259	2020/2021 season (100%)					
134	SWE	Matilda Algotsson	259	2019/2020 season (100%)				144	
134	SWE	Matilda Algotsson	259	2018/2019 season (70%)				115	
134	USA	Akari Nakahara	259	2020/2021 season (100%)					
134	USA	Akari Nakahara	259	2019/2020 season (100%)					
134	USA	Akari Nakahara	259	2018/2019 season (70%)				158	101
136	POL	Oliwia Rzepiel	254	2020/2021 season (100%)					
136	POL	Oliwia Rzepiel	254	2019/2020 season (100%)					
136	POL	Oliwia Rzepiel	254	2018/2019 season (70%)				127	127
136	SUI	Shaline Rüegger	254	2020/2021 season (100%)					
136	SUI	Shaline Rüegger	254	2019/2020 season (100%)					
136	SUI	Shaline Rüegger	254	2018/2019 season (70%)				127	127
138	JPN	Yuna Aoki	251	2020/2021 season (100%)					
138	JPN	Yuna Aoki	251	2019/2020 season (100%)					
138	JPN	Yuna Aoki	251	2018/2019 season (70%)		93		158	
139	NED	Kyarha van Tiel	250	2020/2021 season (100%)					
139	NED	Kyarha van Tiel	250	2019/2020 season (100%)				250	
139	NED	Kyarha van Tiel	250	2018/2019 season (70%)					
139	RUS	Ksenia Tsibinova	250	2020/2021 season (100%)					
139	RUS	Ksenia Tsibinova	250	2019/2020 season (100%)				250	
139	RUS	Ksenia Tsibinova	250	2018/2019 season (70%)					
141	NED	Lindsay van Zundert	247	2020/2021 season (100%)	247				
141	NED	Lindsay van Zundert	247	2019/2020 season (100%)					
141	NED	Lindsay van Zundert	247	2018/2019 season (70%)					
142	CAN	Hannah Dawson	246	2020/2021 season (100%)					
142	CAN	Hannah Dawson	246	2019/2020 season (100%)				178	
142	CAN	Hannah Dawson	246	2018/2019 season (70%)		68			
142	JPN	Shiika Yoshioka	246	2020/2021 season (100%)					
142	JPN	Shiika Yoshioka	246	2019/2020 season (100%)					
142	JPN	Shiika Yoshioka	246	2018/2019 season (70%)		142	104		
142	USA	Courtney Hicks	246	2020/2021 season (100%)					
142	USA	Courtney Hicks	246	2019/2020 season (100%)					
142	USA	Courtney Hicks	246	2018/2019 season (70%)		134		112	
145	EST	Niina Petrokina	245	2020/2021 season (100%)					
145	EST	Niina Petrokina	245	2019/2020 season (100%)		148	97		
145	EST	Niina Petrokina	245	2018/2019 season (70%)					
146	RUS	Elizaveta Nugumanova	243	2020/2021 season (100%)					
146	RUS	Elizaveta Nugumanova	243	2019/2020 season (100%)				243	
146	RUS	Elizaveta Nugumanova	243	2018/2019 season (70%)					
147	CHN	Zhu Yi	237	2020/2021 season (100%)					
147	CHN	Zhu Yi	237	2019/2020 season (100%)	237				
147	CHN	Zhu Yi	237	2018/2019 season (70%)					
147	KOR	Choi Yu-jin	237	2020/2021 season (100%)					
147	KOR	Choi Yu-jin	237	2019/2020 season (100%)					
147	KOR	Choi Yu-jin	237	2018/2019 season (70%)				125	112
149	NED	Caya Scheepens	234	2020/2021 season (100%)					
149	NED	Caya Scheepens	234	2019/2020 season (100%)					
149	NED	Caya Scheepens	234	2018/2019 season (70%)		76		158	
150	UKR	Maryna Zhdanovych	225	2020/2021 season (100%)					
150	UKR	Maryna Zhdanovych	225	2019/2020 season (100%)				225	
150	UKR	Maryna Zhdanovych	225	2018/2019 season (70%)					
150	USA	Emily Zhang	225	2020/2021 season (100%)					
150	USA	Emily Zhang	225	2019/2020 season (100%)				225	
150	USA	Emily Zhang	225	2018/2019 season (70%)					
152	JPN	Moa Iwano	223	2020/2021 season (100%)					
152	JPN	Moa Iwano	223	2019/2020 season (100%)		108			
152	JPN	Moa Iwano	223	2018/2019 season (70%)		115			
153	JPN	Rino Matsuike	203	2020/2021 season (100%)					
153	JPN	Rino Matsuike	203	2019/2020 season (100%)		203			
153	JPN	Rino Matsuike	203	2018/2019 season (70%)					
153	TUR	Güzide Irmak Bayır	203	2020/2021 season (100%)					
153	TUR	Güzide Irmak Bayır	203	2019/2020 season (100%)				203	
153	TUR	Güzide Irmak Bayır	203	2018/2019 season (70%)					
155	SUI	Anaïs Coraducci	198	2020/2021 season (100%)					
155	SUI	Anaïs Coraducci	198	2019/2020 season (100%)				164	
155	SUI	Anaïs Coraducci	198	2018/2019 season (70%)	34				
156	UKR	Anastasiia Arkhipova	192	2020/2021 season (100%)					
156	UKR	Anastasiia Arkhipova	192	2019/2020 season (100%)					
156	UKR	Anastasiia Arkhipova	192	2018/2019 season (70%)	65	127			
157	GBR	Kristen Spours	190	2020/2021 season (100%)					
157	GBR	Kristen Spours	190	2019/2020 season (100%)					
157	GBR	Kristen Spours	190	2018/2019 season (70%)	48			142	
152	GER	Nathalie Weinzierl	183	2020/2021 season (100%)					
152	GER	Nathalie Weinzierl	183	2019/2020 season (100%)					
152	GER	Nathalie Weinzierl	183	2018/2019 season (70%)	71			112	
152	ISR	Alina Soupian	183	2020/2021 season (100%)					
152	ISR	Alina Soupian	183	2019/2020 season (100%)					
152	ISR	Alina Soupian	183	2018/2019 season (70%)	31	84	68		
160	SGP	Chloe Ing	182	2020/2021 season (100%)					
160	SGP	Chloe Ing	182	2019/2020 season (100%)				182	
160	SGP	Chloe Ing	182	2018/2019 season (70%)					
160	SWE	Cassandra Johansson	182	2020/2021 season (100%)					
160	SWE	Cassandra Johansson	182	2019/2020 season (100%)				182	
160	SWE	Cassandra Johansson	182	2018/2019 season (70%)					
162	KOR	Lee Si-won	178	2020/2021 season (100%)					
162	KOR	Lee Si-won	178	2019/2020 season (100%)				178	
162	KOR	Lee Si-won	178	2018/2019 season (70%)					
163	SUI	Tanja Odermatt	175	2020/2021 season (100%)					
163	SUI	Tanja Odermatt	175	2019/2020 season (100%)					
163	SUI	Tanja Odermatt	175	2018/2019 season (70%)				175	
163	UKR	Anastasia Gozhva	175	2020/2021 season (100%)					
163	UKR	Anastasia Gozhva	175	2019/2020 season (100%)					
163	UKR	Anastasia Gozhva	175	2018/2019 season (70%)				175	
165	AUS	Brooklee Han	170	2020/2021 season (100%)					
165	AUS	Brooklee Han	170	2019/2020 season (100%)					
165	AUS	Brooklee Han	170	2018/2019 season (70%)				170	
165	DEN	Pernille Sørensen	170	2020/2021 season (100%)					
165	DEN	Pernille Sørensen	170	2019/2020 season (100%)					
165	DEN	Pernille Sørensen	170	2018/2019 season (70%)	58			112	
167	SWE	Selma Ihr	168	2020/2021 season (100%)					
167	SWE	Selma Ihr	168	2019/2020 season (100%)					
167	SWE	Selma Ihr	168	2018/2019 season (70%)		84	84		
168	CZE	Klára Štěpánová	164	2020/2021 season (100%)					
168	CZE	Klára Štěpánová	164	2019/2020 season (100%)				164	
168	CZE	Klára Štěpánová	164	2018/2019 season (70%)					
168	EST	Kristina Škuleta-Gromova	164	2020/2021 season (100%)					
168	EST	Kristina Škuleta-Gromova	164	2019/2020 season (100%)				164	
168	EST	Kristina Škuleta-Gromova	164	2018/2019 season (70%)					
168	FIN	Oona Ounasvuori	164	2020/2021 season (100%)					
168	FIN	Oona Ounasvuori	164	2019/2020 season (100%)				164	
168	FIN	Oona Ounasvuori	164	2018/2019 season (70%)					
168	ISR	Nelli Ioffe	164	2020/2021 season (100%)					
168	ISR	Nelli Ioffe	164	2019/2020 season (100%)				164	
168	ISR	Nelli Ioffe	164	2018/2019 season (70%)					
168	USA	Sierra Venetta	164	2020/2021 season (100%)					
168	USA	Sierra Venetta	164	2019/2020 season (100%)				164	
168	USA	Sierra Venetta	164	2018/2019 season (70%)					
173	BLR	Milana Ramashova	157	2020/2021 season (100%)					
173	BLR	Milana Ramashova	157	2019/2020 season (100%)	157				
173	BLR	Milana Ramashova	157	2018/2019 season (70%)					
174	TPE	Jenny Shyu	156	2020/2021 season (100%)					
174	TPE	Jenny Shyu	156	2019/2020 season (100%)	156				
174	TPE	Jenny Shyu	156	2018/2019 season (70%)					
175	RUS	Alena Leonova	149	2020/2021 season (100%)					
175	RUS	Alena Leonova	149	2019/2020 season (100%)					
175	RUS	Alena Leonova	149	2018/2019 season (70%)		149			
176	CAN	Kaiya Ruiter	148	2020/2021 season (100%)					
176	CAN	Kaiya Ruiter	148	2019/2020 season (100%)		148			
176	CAN	Kaiya Ruiter	148	2018/2019 season (70%)					
176	USA	Kate Wang	148	2020/2021 season (100%)					
176	USA	Kate Wang	148	2019/2020 season (100%)		148			
176	USA	Kate Wang	148	2018/2019 season (70%)					
178	CAN	Michelle Long	144	2020/2021 season (100%)					
178	CAN	Michelle Long	144	2019/2020 season (100%)				144	
178	CAN	Michelle Long	144	2018/2019 season (70%)					
178	CHN	Zhang Yixuan	144	2020/2021 season (100%)					
178	CHN	Zhang Yixuan	144	2019/2020 season (100%)				144	
178	CHN	Zhang Yixuan	144	2018/2019 season (70%)					
176	CAN	Aurora Cotop	148	2020/2021 season (100%)					
176	CAN	Aurora Cotop	148	2019/2020 season (100%)					
176	CAN	Aurora Cotop	148	2018/2019 season (70%)				142	
176	GBR	Bethany Powell	148	2020/2021 season (100%)					
176	GBR	Bethany Powell	148	2019/2020 season (100%)					
176	GBR	Bethany Powell	148	2018/2019 season (70%)				142	
176	ITA	Elisabetta Leccardi	148	2020/2021 season (100%)					
176	ITA	Elisabetta Leccardi	148	2019/2020 season (100%)					
176	ITA	Elisabetta Leccardi	148	2018/2019 season (70%)				142	
176	USA	Brynne McIsaac	148	2020/2021 season (100%)					
176	USA	Brynne McIsaac	148	2019/2020 season (100%)					
176	USA	Brynne McIsaac	148	2018/2019 season (70%)				142	
184	USA	Emilia Murdock	133	2020/2021 season (100%)					
184	USA	Emilia Murdock	133	2019/2020 season (100%)		133			
184	USA	Emilia Murdock	133	2018/2019 season (70%)					
185	GBR	Nina Povey	127	2020/2021 season (100%)					
185	GBR	Nina Povey	127	2019/2020 season (100%)				127	
185	GBR	Nina Povey	127	2018/2019 season (70%)					
185	LTU	Elžbieta Kropa	127	2020/2021 season (100%)					
185	LTU	Elžbieta Kropa	127	2019/2020 season (100%)				127	
185	LTU	Elžbieta Kropa	127	2018/2019 season (70%)					
185	USA	Maxine Bautista	127	2020/2021 season (100%)					
185	USA	Maxine Bautista	127	2019/2020 season (100%)				127	
185	USA	Maxine Bautista	127	2018/2019 season (70%)					
188	HKG	Cheuk Ka Kahlen Cheung	126	2020/2021 season (100%)					
188	HKG	Cheuk Ka Kahlen Cheung	126	2019/2020 season (100%)	126				
188	HKG	Cheuk Ka Kahlen Cheung	126	2018/2019 season (70%)					
189	USA	Jessica Lin	120	2020/2021 season (100%)					
189	USA	Jessica Lin	120	2019/2020 season (100%)		120			
189	USA	Jessica Lin	120	2018/2019 season (70%)					
189	USA	Lindsay Thorngren	120	2020/2021 season (100%)					
189	USA	Lindsay Thorngren	120	2019/2020 season (100%)		120			
189	USA	Lindsay Thorngren	120	2018/2019 season (70%)					
191	BUL	Kristina Grigorova	115	2020/2021 season (100%)					
191	BUL	Kristina Grigorova	115	2019/2020 season (100%)					
191	BUL	Kristina Grigorova	115	2018/2019 season (70%)				115	
191	FIN	Jade Rautiainen	115	2020/2021 season (100%)					
191	FIN	Jade Rautiainen	115	2019/2020 season (100%)					
191	FIN	Jade Rautiainen	115	2018/2019 season (70%)				115	
191	GRE	Dimitra Korri	115	2020/2021 season (100%)					
191	GRE	Dimitra Korri	115	2019/2020 season (100%)					
191	GRE	Dimitra Korri	115	2018/2019 season (70%)				115	
191	ITA	Anna Memola	115	2020/2021 season (100%)					
191	ITA	Anna Memola	115	2019/2020 season (100%)					
191	ITA	Anna Memola	115	2018/2019 season (70%)				115	
191	SVK	Bronislava Dobiášová	115	2020/2021 season (100%)					
191	SVK	Bronislava Dobiášová	115	2019/2020 season (100%)					
191	SVK	Bronislava Dobiášová	115	2018/2019 season (70%)				115	
191	SWE	Natasja Remstedt	115	2020/2021 season (100%)					
191	SWE	Natasja Remstedt	115	2019/2020 season (100%)					
191	SWE	Natasja Remstedt	115	2018/2019 season (70%)				115	
197	ITA	Micol Cristini	101	2020/2021 season (100%)					
197	ITA	Micol Cristini	101	2019/2020 season (100%)					
197	ITA	Micol Cristini	101	2018/2019 season (70%)				101	
197	KOR	Park So-youn	101	2020/2021 season (100%)					
197	KOR	Park So-youn	101	2019/2020 season (100%)					
197	KOR	Park So-youn	101	2018/2019 season (70%)				101	
197	SVK	Silvia Hugec	101	2020/2021 season (100%)					
197	SVK	Silvia Hugec	101	2019/2020 season (100%)					
197	SVK	Silvia Hugec	101	2018/2019 season (70%)				101	
197	USA	Angela Wang	101	2020/2021 season (100%)					
197	USA	Angela Wang	101	2019/2020 season (100%)					
197	USA	Angela Wang	101	2018/2019 season (70%)				101	
201	CHN	Jin Hengxin	97	2020/2021 season (100%)					
201	CHN	Jin Hengxin	97	2019/2020 season (100%)		97			
201	CHN	Jin Hengxin	97	2018/2019 season (70%)					
201	ITA	Ginevra Lavinia Negrello	97	2020/2021 season (100%)					
201	ITA	Ginevra Lavinia Negrello	97	2019/2020 season (100%)		97			
201	ITA	Ginevra Lavinia Negrello	97	2018/2019 season (70%)					
201	USA	Sarah Jung	97	2020/2021 season (100%)					
201	USA	Sarah Jung	97	2019/2020 season (100%)		97			
201	USA	Sarah Jung	97	2018/2019 season (70%)					
204	TPE	Ting Tzu-Han	93	2020/2021 season (100%)					
204	TPE	Ting Tzu-Han	93	2019/2020 season (100%)	93				
204	TPE	Ting Tzu-Han	93	2018/2019 season (70%)					
204	JPN	Riko Takino	93	2020/2021 season (100%)					
204	JPN	Riko Takino	93	2019/2020 season (100%)					
204	JPN	Riko Takino	93	2018/2019 season (70%)		93			
206	USA	Pooja Kalyan	84	2020/2021 season (100%)					
206	USA	Pooja Kalyan	84	2019/2020 season (100%)					
206	USA	Pooja Kalyan	84	2018/2019 season (70%)		84			
207	CAN	Sarah-Maude Blanchard	76	2020/2021 season (100%)					
207	CAN	Sarah-Maude Blanchard	76	2019/2020 season (100%)					
207	CAN	Sarah-Maude Blanchard	76	2018/2019 season (70%)		76			
207	CAN	Emma Bulawka	76	2020/2021 season (100%)					
207	CAN	Emma Bulawka	76	2019/2020 season (100%)					
207	CAN	Emma Bulawka	76	2018/2019 season (70%)		76			
207	LTU	Paulina Ramanauskaitė	76	2020/2021 season (100%)					
207	LTU	Paulina Ramanauskaitė	76	2019/2020 season (100%)					
207	LTU	Paulina Ramanauskaitė	76	2018/2019 season (70%)		76			
210	GER	Nargiz Süleymanova	75	2020/2021 season (100%)					
210	GER	Nargiz Süleymanova	75	2019/2020 season (100%)	75				
210	GER	Nargiz Süleymanova	75	2018/2019 season (70%)					
211	HKG	Joanna So	75	2020/2021 season (100%)					
211	HKG	Joanna So	75	2019/2020 season (100%)					
211	HKG	Joanna So	75	2018/2019 season (70%)	71				
212	UKR	Anastasiia Shabotova	68	2020/2021 season (100%)					
212	UKR	Anastasiia Shabotova	68	2019/2020 season (100%)	68				
212	UKR	Anastasiia Shabotova	68	2018/2019 season (70%)					
213	LAT	Anete Lāce	61	2020/2021 season (100%)					
213	LAT	Anete Lāce	61	2019/2020 season (100%)	61				
213	LAT	Anete Lāce	61	2018/2019 season (70%)					
214	HUN	Regina Schermann	44	2020/2021 season (100%)					
214	HUN	Regina Schermann	44	2019/2020 season (100%)	44				
214	HUN	Regina Schermann	44	2018/2019 season (70%)					

==== Pairs ====
As of March 25, 2021.

Rank	Nation	Couple	Points	Season	ISU Championships or Olympics	(Junior) Grand Prix and Final		Selected International Competition	
Rank	Nation	Couple	Points	Season	Best	Best	2nd Best	Best	2nd Best
1	CHN	Peng Cheng / Jin Yang	3662	2020/2021 season (100%)	787				
1	CHN	Peng Cheng / Jin Yang	3662	2019/2020 season (100%)	756	720	400	243	
1	CHN	Peng Cheng / Jin Yang	3662	2018/2019 season (70%)	(613)	504	252		
2	RUS	Aleksandra Boikova / Dmitrii Kozlovskii	3585	2020/2021 season (100%)	972				
2	RUS	Aleksandra Boikova / Dmitrii Kozlovskii	3585	2019/2020 season (100%)	840	583	400		
2	RUS	Aleksandra Boikova / Dmitrii Kozlovskii	3585	2018/2019 season (70%)	(496)	227	204	189	170
3	RUS	Anastasia Mishina / Aleksandr Galliamov	3568	2020/2021 season (100%)	1200				
3	RUS	Anastasia Mishina / Aleksandr Galliamov	3568	2019/2020 season (100%)		648	400	300	250
3	RUS	Anastasia Mishina / Aleksandr Galliamov	3568	2018/2019 season (70%)	350	245	175		
4	RUS	Evgenia Tarasova / Vladimir Morozov	3529	2020/2021 season (100%)	875				
4	RUS	Evgenia Tarasova / Vladimir Morozov	3529	2019/2020 season (100%)	756	360	324	270	
4	RUS	Evgenia Tarasova / Vladimir Morozov	3529	2018/2019 season (70%)	(756)	454	280	210	
5	CAN	Kirsten Moore-Towers / Michael Marinaro	3383	2020/2021 season (100%)	709				
5	CAN	Kirsten Moore-Towers / Michael Marinaro	3383	2019/2020 season (100%)	680	525	360	300	
5	CAN	Kirsten Moore-Towers / Michael Marinaro	3383	2018/2019 season (70%)	(529)	227	204	189	189
6	CHN	Sui Wenjing / Han Cong	3120	2020/2021 season (100%)	1080				
6	CHN	Sui Wenjing / Han Cong	3120	2019/2020 season (100%)	840	800	400		
6	CHN	Sui Wenjing / Han Cong	3120	2018/2019 season (70%)	(840)				
7	USA	Ashley Cain-Gribble / Timothy LeDuc	2840	2020/2021 season (100%)	517				
7	USA	Ashley Cain-Gribble / Timothy LeDuc	2840	2019/2020 season (100%)		292	262	300	300
7	USA	Ashley Cain-Gribble / Timothy LeDuc	2840	2018/2019 season (70%)	428	227	165	210	139
8	RUS	Daria Pavliuchenko / Denis Khodykin	2736	2020/2021 season (100%)					
8	RUS	Daria Pavliuchenko / Denis Khodykin	2736	2019/2020 season (100%)	680	472	360		
8	RUS	Daria Pavliuchenko / Denis Khodykin	2736	2018/2019 season (70%)	386	330	227	142	139
9	AUT	Miriam Ziegler / Severin Kiefer	2730	2020/2021 season (100%)	418				
9	AUT	Miriam Ziegler / Severin Kiefer	2730	2019/2020 season (100%)	496	292	262	250	219
9	AUT	Miriam Ziegler / Severin Kiefer	2730	2018/2019 season (70%)	(326)	204	204	210	175
10	ITA	Nicole Della Monica / Matteo Guarise	2684	2020/2021 season (100%)	574				
10	ITA	Nicole Della Monica / Matteo Guarise	2684	2019/2020 season (100%)	612	292	191	225	
10	ITA	Nicole Della Monica / Matteo Guarise	2684	2018/2019 season (70%)	(428)	368	252	170	
11	GER	Minerva Fabienne Hase / Nolan Seegert	2536	2020/2021 season (100%)					
11	GER	Minerva Fabienne Hase / Nolan Seegert	2536	2019/2020 season (100%)	551	324	213	243	198
11	GER	Minerva Fabienne Hase / Nolan Seegert	2536	2018/2019 season (70%)	347	183	149	175	153
12	USA	Tarah Kayne / Danny O'Shea	2483	2020/2021 season (100%)					
12	USA	Tarah Kayne / Danny O'Shea	2483	2019/2020 season (100%)	551	236	236	270	219
12	USA	Tarah Kayne / Danny O'Shea	2483	2018/2019 season (70%)	347	252	183	189	
13	ITA	Rebecca Ghilardi / Filippo Ambrosini	1780	2020/2021 season (100%)	(222)				
13	ITA	Rebecca Ghilardi / Filippo Ambrosini	1780	2019/2020 season (100%)	402	213	191	250	203
13	ITA	Rebecca Ghilardi / Filippo Ambrosini	1780	2018/2019 season (70%)	253			153	115
14	RUS	Apollinariia Panfilova / Dmitry Rylov	1772	2020/2021 season (100%)					
14	RUS	Apollinariia Panfilova / Dmitry Rylov	1772	2019/2020 season (100%)	500	350	250		
14	RUS	Apollinariia Panfilova / Dmitry Rylov	1772	2018/2019 season (70%)	315	199	158		
15	USA	Jessica Calalang / Brian Johnson	1763	2020/2021 season (100%)					
15	USA	Jessica Calalang / Brian Johnson	1763	2019/2020 season (100%)	612	292	236	300	
15	USA	Jessica Calalang / Brian Johnson	1763	2018/2019 season (70%)				170	153
16	FRA	Vanessa James / Morgan Ciprès	1638	2020/2021 season (100%)					
16	FRA	Vanessa James / Morgan Ciprès	1638	2019/2020 season (100%)					
16	FRA	Vanessa James / Morgan Ciprès	1638	2018/2019 season (70%)	588	560	280	210	
17	CAN	Evelyn Walsh / Trennt Michaud	1617	2020/2021 season (100%)	377				
17	CAN	Evelyn Walsh / Trennt Michaud	1617	2019/2020 season (100%)	496	236	191		
17	CAN	Evelyn Walsh / Trennt Michaud	1617	2018/2019 season (70%)	(312)	183	134		
18	GER	Annika Hocke / Robert Kunkel	1420	2020/2021 season (100%)	339				
18	GER	Annika Hocke / Robert Kunkel	1420	2019/2020 season (100%)	446	207	203	225	
18	GER	Annika Hocke / Robert Kunkel	1420	2018/2019 season (70%)					
19	RUS	Kseniia Akhanteva / Valerii Kolesov	1338	2020/2021 season (100%)					
19	RUS	Kseniia Akhanteva / Valerii Kolesov	1338	2019/2020 season (100%)	450	284	250		
19	RUS	Kseniia Akhanteva / Valerii Kolesov	1338	2018/2019 season (70%)		179	175		
20	USA	Audrey Lu / Misha Mitrofanov	1256	2020/2021 season (100%)					
20	USA	Audrey Lu / Misha Mitrofanov	1256	2019/2020 season (100%)		191		225	198
20	USA	Audrey Lu / Misha Mitrofanov	1256	2018/2019 season (70%)		165	149	189	139
21	CAN	Camille Ruest / Andrew Wolfe	1209	2020/2021 season (100%)					
21	CAN	Camille Ruest / Andrew Wolfe	1209	2019/2020 season (100%)		236	236		
21	CAN	Camille Ruest / Andrew Wolfe	1209	2018/2019 season (70%)	281	183	134	139	
22	PRK	Ryom Tae-ok / Kim Ju-sik	1185	2020/2021 season (100%)					
22	PRK	Ryom Tae-ok / Kim Ju-sik	1185	2019/2020 season (100%)		262		243	
22	PRK	Ryom Tae-ok / Kim Ju-sik	1185	2018/2019 season (70%)	293	204	183		
23	GBR	Zoe Jones / Christopher Boyadji	1165	2020/2021 season (100%)					
23	GBR	Zoe Jones / Christopher Boyadji	1165	2019/2020 season (100%)	264	191		182	
23	GBR	Zoe Jones / Christopher Boyadji	1165	2018/2019 season (70%)	228			158	142
24	JPN	Riku Miura / Ryuichi Kihara	1129	2020/2021 season (100%)	465				
24	JPN	Riku Miura / Ryuichi Kihara	1129	2019/2020 season (100%)	402	262			
24	JPN	Riku Miura / Ryuichi Kihara	1129	2018/2019 season (70%)					
25	CHN	Tang Feiyao / Yang Yongchao	1109	2020/2021 season (100%)					
25	CHN	Tang Feiyao / Yang Yongchao	1109	2019/2020 season (100%)		213	213	219	
25	CHN	Tang Feiyao / Yang Yongchao	1109	2018/2019 season (70%)	256	115	93		
26	RUS	Alina Pepeleva / Roman Pleshkov	1095	2020/2021 season (100%)					
26	RUS	Alina Pepeleva / Roman Pleshkov	1095	2019/2020 season (100%)		230	203	270	250
26	RUS	Alina Pepeleva / Roman Pleshkov	1095	2018/2019 season (70%)		142			
27	HUN	Ioulia Chtchetinina / Márk Magyar	1010	2020/2021 season (100%)	305				
27	HUN	Ioulia Chtchetinina / Márk Magyar	1010	2019/2020 season (100%)	325			198	182
27	HUN	Ioulia Chtchetinina / Márk Magyar	1010	2018/2019 season (70%)					
28	ISR	Anna Vernikov / Evgeni Krasnopolski	926	2020/2021 season (100%)	180				
28	ISR	Anna Vernikov / Evgeni Krasnopolski	926	2019/2020 season (100%)	237			203	164
28	ISR	Anna Vernikov / Evgeni Krasnopolski	926	2018/2019 season (70%)				142	
29	RUS	Iuliia Artemeva / Mikhail Nazarychev	910	2020/2021 season (100%)					
29	RUS	Iuliia Artemeva / Mikhail Nazarychev	910	2019/2020 season (100%)	405	255	250		
29	RUS	Iuliia Artemeva / Mikhail Nazarychev	910	2018/2019 season (70%)					
30	USA	Kate Finster / Balazs Nagy	866	2020/2021 season (100%)					
30	USA	Kate Finster / Balazs Nagy	866	2019/2020 season (100%)	295	225	148		
30	USA	Kate Finster / Balazs Nagy	866	2018/2019 season (70%)	122	76			
31	FRA	Cléo Hamon / Denys Strekalin	863	2020/2021 season (100%)	162				
31	FRA	Cléo Hamon / Denys Strekalin	863	2019/2020 season (100%)	362	120			
31	FRA	Cléo Hamon / Denys Strekalin	863	2018/2019 season (70%)	(151)	115	104		
32	CRO	Lana Petranović / Antonio Souza-Kordeiru	775	2020/2021 season (100%)					
32	CRO	Lana Petranović / Antonio Souza-Kordeiru	775	2019/2020 season (100%)	192	120			
32	CRO	Lana Petranović / Antonio Souza-Kordeiru	775	2018/2019 season (70%)	281			175	127
33	RUS	Polina Kostiukovich / Dmitrii Ialin	680	2020/2021 season (100%)					
33	RUS	Polina Kostiukovich / Dmitrii Ialin	680	2019/2020 season (100%)					
33	RUS	Polina Kostiukovich / Dmitrii Ialin	680	2018/2019 season (70%)	284	221	175		
34	USA	Alexa Knierim / Brandon Frazier	638	2020/2021 season (100%)	638				
34	USA	Alexa Knierim / Brandon Frazier	638	2019/2020 season (100%)					
34	USA	Alexa Knierim / Brandon Frazier	638	2018/2019 season (70%)					
35	CHN	Wang Huidi / Jia Ziqi	561	2020/2021 season (100%)					
35	CHN	Wang Huidi / Jia Ziqi	561	2019/2020 season (100%)	215	182	164		
35	CHN	Wang Huidi / Jia Ziqi	561	2018/2019 season (70%)					
36	RUS	Diana Mukhametzianova / Ilya Mironov	540	2020/2021 season (100%)					
36	RUS	Diana Mukhametzianova / Ilya Mironov	540	2019/2020 season (100%)		315	225		
36	RUS	Diana Mukhametzianova / Ilya Mironov	540	2018/2019 season (70%)					
37	CHN	Wang Yuchen / Huang Yihang	539	2020/2021 season (100%)					
37	CHN	Wang Yuchen / Huang Yihang	539	2019/2020 season (100%)	239	108	108		
37	CHN	Wang Yuchen / Huang Yihang	539	2018/2019 season (70%)		84			
38	GEO	Alina Butaeva / Luka Berulava	534	2020/2021 season (100%)					
38	GEO	Alina Butaeva / Luka Berulava	534	2019/2020 season (100%)	266	148	120		
38	GEO	Alina Butaeva / Luka Berulava	534	2018/2019 season (70%)					
39	USA	Laiken Lockley / Keenan Prochnow	438	2020/2021 season (100%)					
39	USA	Laiken Lockley / Keenan Prochnow	438	2019/2020 season (100%)					
39	USA	Laiken Lockley / Keenan Prochnow	438	2018/2019 season (70%)	207	127	104		
40	UKR	Kateryna Dzitsiuk / Ivan Pavlov	423	2020/2021 season (100%)					
40	UKR	Kateryna Dzitsiuk / Ivan Pavlov	423	2019/2020 season (100%)	157	133	133		
40	UKR	Kateryna Dzitsiuk / Ivan Pavlov	423	2018/2019 season (70%)					
41	GER	Elena Pavlova / Ruben Blommaert	380	2020/2021 season (100%)					
41	GER	Elena Pavlova / Ruben Blommaert	380	2019/2020 season (100%)				198	182
41	GER	Elena Pavlova / Ruben Blommaert	380	2018/2019 season (70%)					
42	PHI	Isabella Gamez / David-Alexandre Paradis	362	2020/2021 season (100%)					
42	PHI	Isabella Gamez / David-Alexandre Paradis	362	2019/2020 season (100%)	362				
42	PHI	Isabella Gamez / David-Alexandre Paradis	362	2018/2019 season (70%)					
43	USA	Anastasiia Smirnova / Danylo Siianytsia	327	2020/2021 season (100%)					
43	USA	Anastasiia Smirnova / Danylo Siianytsia	327	2019/2020 season (100%)	194	133			
43	USA	Anastasiia Smirnova / Danylo Siianytsia	327	2018/2019 season (70%)					
44	ISR	Hailey Kops / Artem Tsoglin	301	2020/2021 season (100%)					
44	ISR	Hailey Kops / Artem Tsoglin	301	2019/2020 season (100%)					
44	ISR	Hailey Kops / Artem Tsoglin	301	2018/2019 season (70%)	186			115	
45	FRA	Coline Keriven / Noël-Antoine Pierre	293	2020/2021 season (100%)					
45	FRA	Coline Keriven / Noël-Antoine Pierre	293	2019/2020 season (100%)	293				
45	FRA	Coline Keriven / Noël-Antoine Pierre	293	2018/2019 season (70%)					
46	CAN	Kelly Ann Laurin / Loucas Ethier	275	2020/2021 season (100%)					
46	CAN	Kelly Ann Laurin / Loucas Ethier	275	2019/2020 season (100%)	127	148			
46	CAN	Kelly Ann Laurin / Loucas Ethier	275	2018/2019 season (70%)					
46	CZE	Elizaveta Zhuk / Martin Bidař	275	2020/2021 season (100%)	275				
46	CZE	Elizaveta Zhuk / Martin Bidař	275	2019/2020 season (100%)					
46	CZE	Elizaveta Zhuk / Martin Bidař	275	2018/2019 season (70%)					
48	ITA	Vivienne Contarino / Marco Pauletti	263	2020/2021 season (100%)					
48	ITA	Vivienne Contarino / Marco Pauletti	263	2019/2020 season (100%)				164	
48	ITA	Vivienne Contarino / Marco Pauletti	263	2018/2019 season (70%)	99				
49	GEO	Anastasiia Metelkina / Daniil Parkman	247	2020/2021 season (100%)	247				
49	GEO	Anastasiia Metelkina / Daniil Parkman	247	2019/2020 season (100%)					
49	GEO	Anastasiia Metelkina / Daniil Parkman	247	2018/2019 season (70%)					
50	BLR	Bogdana Lukashevich / Alexander Stepanov	200	2020/2021 season (100%)	200				
50	BLR	Bogdana Lukashevich / Alexander Stepanov	200	2019/2020 season (100%)					
50	BLR	Bogdana Lukashevich / Alexander Stepanov	200	2018/2019 season (70%)					
51	USA	Olivia Serafini / Mervin Tran	198	2020/2021 season (100%)					
51	USA	Olivia Serafini / Mervin Tran	198	2019/2020 season (100%)				198	
51	USA	Olivia Serafini / Mervin Tran	198	2018/2019 season (70%)					
52	CHN	Liu Motong / Wang Tianze	176	2020/2021 season (100%)					
52	CHN	Liu Motong / Wang Tianze	176	2019/2020 season (100%)		108			
52	CHN	Liu Motong / Wang Tianze	176	2018/2019 season (70%)		68			
53	NED	Daria Danilova / Michel Tsiba	173	2020/2021 season (100%)					
53	NED	Daria Danilova / Michel Tsiba	173	2019/2020 season (100%)	173				
53	NED	Daria Danilova / Michel Tsiba	173	2018/2019 season (70%)					
54	PRK	Ro Hyang-mi / Han Kum-chol	164	2020/2021 season (100%)					
54	PRK	Ro Hyang-mi / Han Kum-chol	164	2019/2020 season (100%)		164			
54	PRK	Ro Hyang-mi / Han Kum-chol	164	2018/2019 season (70%)					
54	ITA	Sara Conti / Niccolò Macii	164	2020/2021 season (100%)					
54	ITA	Sara Conti / Niccolò Macii	164	2019/2020 season (100%)				164	
54	ITA	Sara Conti / Niccolò Macii	164	2018/2019 season (70%)					
56	USA	Winter Deardorff / Mikhail Johnson	141	2020/2021 season (100%)					
56	USA	Winter Deardorff / Mikhail Johnson	141	2019/2020 season (100%)	141				
56	USA	Winter Deardorff / Mikhail Johnson	141	2018/2019 season (70%)					
57	CAN	Lori-Ann Matte / Thierry Ferland	139	2020/2021 season (100%)					
57	CAN	Lori-Ann Matte / Thierry Ferland	139	2019/2020 season (100%)					
57	CAN	Lori-Ann Matte / Thierry Ferland	139	2018/2019 season (70%)				139	
58	SUI	Alexandra Herbríková / Nicolas Roulet	115	2020/2021 season (100%)					
58	SUI	Alexandra Herbríková / Nicolas Roulet	115	2019/2020 season (100%)					
58	SUI	Alexandra Herbríková / Nicolas Roulet	115	2018/2019 season (70%)				115	
59	SWE	Greta Crafoord / John Crafoord	247	2020/2021 season (100%)					
59	SWE	Greta Crafoord / John Crafoord	247	2019/2020 season (100%)	114				
59	SWE	Greta Crafoord / John Crafoord	247	2018/2019 season (70%)					
60	ITA	Alyssa Montan / Manuel Piazza	103	2020/2021 season (100%)					
60	ITA	Alyssa Montan / Manuel Piazza	103	2019/2020 season (100%)	103				
60	ITA	Alyssa Montan / Manuel Piazza	103	2018/2019 season (70%)					
61	USA	Isabelle Martins / Ryan Bedard	97	2020/2021 season (100%)					
61	USA	Isabelle Martins / Ryan Bedard	97	2019/2020 season (100%)		97			
61	USA	Isabelle Martins / Ryan Bedard	97	2018/2019 season (70%)					

==== Ice dance ====
As of March 27, 2021.

Rank	Nation	Couple	Points	Season	ISU Championships or Olympics	(Junior) Grand Prix and Final		Selected International Competition	
Rank	Nation	Couple	Points	Season	Best	Best	2nd Best	Best	2nd Best
1	RUS	Victoria Sinitsina / Nikita Katsalapov	4178	2020/2021 season (100%)	1200				
1	RUS	Victoria Sinitsina / Nikita Katsalapov	4178	2019/2020 season (100%)	840	472	400	300	
1	RUS	Victoria Sinitsina / Nikita Katsalapov	4178	2018/2019 season (70%)	(756)	504	252	210	
2	USA	Madison Hubbell / Zachary Donohue	3858	2020/2021 season (100%)	1080				
2	USA	Madison Hubbell / Zachary Donohue	3858	2019/2020 season (100%)	680	648	400		
2	USA	Madison Hubbell / Zachary Donohue	3858	2018/2019 season (70%)	(680)	560	280	210	
3	CAN	Piper Gilles / Paul Poirier	3827	2020/2021 season (100%)	972				
3	CAN	Piper Gilles / Paul Poirier	3827	2019/2020 season (100%)	756	525	400	300	
3	CAN	Piper Gilles / Paul Poirier	3827	2018/2019 season (70%)	(476)	227	227	210	210
4	ITA	Charlène Guignard / Marco Fabbri	3695	2020/2021 season (100%)	709				
4	ITA	Charlène Guignard / Marco Fabbri	3695	2019/2020 season (100%)	612	324	324	300	300
4	ITA	Charlène Guignard / Marco Fabbri	3695	2018/2019 season (70%)	(476)	454	252	210	210
5	USA	Madison Chock / Evan Bates	3570	2020/2021 season (100%)	875				
5	USA	Madison Chock / Evan Bates	3570	2019/2020 season (100%)	840	720	360	300	300
5	USA	Madison Chock / Evan Bates	3570	2018/2019 season (70%)	(588)			175	
6	RUS	Alexandra Stepanova / Ivan Bukin	3308	2020/2021 season (100%)	787				
6	RUS	Alexandra Stepanova / Ivan Bukin	3308	2019/2020 season (100%)	680	583	360		
6	RUS	Alexandra Stepanova / Ivan Bukin	3308	2018/2019 season (70%)	(613)	408	280	210	
7	FRA	Gabriella Papadakis / Guillaume Cizeron	3076	2020/2021 season (100%)					
7	FRA	Gabriella Papadakis / Guillaume Cizeron	3076	2019/2020 season (100%)	756	800	400		
7	FRA	Gabriella Papadakis / Guillaume Cizeron	3076	2018/2019 season (70%)	840	280			
8	GBR	Lilah Fear / Lewis Gibson	2973	2020/2021 season (100%)	638				
8	GBR	Lilah Fear / Lewis Gibson	2973	2019/2020 season (100%)	551	324	292	270	219
8	GBR	Lilah Fear / Lewis Gibson	2973	2018/2019 season (70%)	(347)	204	183	153	139
9	CHN	Wang Shiyue / Liu Xinyu	2693	2020/2021 season (100%)	339				
9	CHN	Wang Shiyue / Liu Xinyu	2693	2019/2020 season (100%)	612	292	262	270	225
9	CHN	Wang Shiyue / Liu Xinyu	2693	2018/2019 season (70%)	(312)	165	165	210	153
10	ESP	Sara Hurtado / Kirill Khaliavin	2646	2020/2021 season (100%)	418				
10	ESP	Sara Hurtado / Kirill Khaliavin	2646	2019/2020 season (100%)	446	324	262	300	270
10	ESP	Sara Hurtado / Kirill Khaliavin	2646	2018/2019 season (70%)	(312)	252	204	170	
11	POL	Natalia Kaliszek / Maksym Spodyriev	2518	2020/2021 season (100%)	377				
11	POL	Natalia Kaliszek / Maksym Spodyriev	2518	2019/2020 season (100%)	(362)	292	236	270	250
11	POL	Natalia Kaliszek / Maksym Spodyriev	2518	2018/2019 season (70%)	386	183	165	189	170
12	USA	Kaitlin Hawayek / Jean-Luc Baker	2447	2020/2021 season (100%)	517				
12	USA	Kaitlin Hawayek / Jean-Luc Baker	2447	2019/2020 season (100%)	496	292	262	270	
12	USA	Kaitlin Hawayek / Jean-Luc Baker	2447	2018/2019 season (70%)	(386)	330	280		
13	ESP	Olivia Smart / Adrián Díaz	2446	2020/2021 season (100%)					
13	ESP	Olivia Smart / Adrián Díaz	2446	2019/2020 season (100%)	402	292	292	250	219
13	ESP	Olivia Smart / Adrián Díaz	2446	2018/2019 season (70%)	281	183	149	189	189
14	RUS	Tiffany Zahorski / Jonathan Guerreiro	2280	2020/2021 season (100%)	465				
14	RUS	Tiffany Zahorski / Jonathan Guerreiro	2280	2019/2020 season (100%)	496	262	262		
14	RUS	Tiffany Zahorski / Jonathan Guerreiro	2280	2018/2019 season (70%)		368	252	175	
15	CAN	Laurence Fournier Beaudry / Nikolaj Sørensen	2139	2020/2021 season (100%)	574				
15	CAN	Laurence Fournier Beaudry / Nikolaj Sørensen	2139	2019/2020 season (100%)		324	324	300	270
15	CAN	Laurence Fournier Beaudry / Nikolaj Sørensen	2139	2018/2019 season (70%)	347				
16	GEO	Maria Kazakova / Georgy Reviya	2041	2020/2021 season (100%)					
16	GEO	Maria Kazakova / Georgy Reviya	2041	2019/2020 season (100%)	450	350	250	243	225
16	GEO	Maria Kazakova / Georgy Reviya	2041	2018/2019 season (70%)	207	158	158		
17	CAN	Carolane Soucisse / Shane Firus	1931	2020/2021 season (100%)					
17	CAN	Carolane Soucisse / Shane Firus	1931	2019/2020 season (100%)	446	213	191	243	198
17	CAN	Carolane Soucisse / Shane Firus	1931	2018/2019 season (70%)		183	134	170	153
18	CAN	Marjorie Lajoie / Zachary Lagha	1923	2020/2021 season (100%)	(305)				
18	CAN	Marjorie Lajoie / Zachary Lagha	1923	2019/2020 season (100%)	551	236	213	219	
18	CAN	Marjorie Lajoie / Zachary Lagha	1923	2018/2019 season (70%)	350	179	175		
19	FRA	Marie-Jade Lauriault / Romain Le Gac	1862	2020/2021 season (100%)					
19	FRA	Marie-Jade Lauriault / Romain Le Gac	1862	2019/2020 season (100%)		191	191	300	243
19	FRA	Marie-Jade Lauriault / Romain Le Gac	1862	2018/2019 season (70%)	228	204	165	170	170
20	USA	Christina Carreira / Anthony Ponomarenko	1851	2020/2021 season (100%)					
20	USA	Christina Carreira / Anthony Ponomarenko	1851	2019/2020 season (100%)		236	236	300	270
20	USA	Christina Carreira / Anthony Ponomarenko	1851	2018/2019 season (70%)		227	183	210	189
21	LTU	Allison Reed / Saulius Ambrulevičius	1716	2020/2021 season (100%)	275				
21	LTU	Allison Reed / Saulius Ambrulevičius	1716	2019/2020 season (100%)	293	262		250	198
21	LTU	Allison Reed / Saulius Ambrulevičius	1716	2018/2019 season (70%)	(166)	165		158	115
22	FRA	Adelina Galyavieva / Louis Thauron	1399	2020/2021 season (100%)	247				
22	FRA	Adelina Galyavieva / Louis Thauron	1399	2019/2020 season (100%)	264	191		225	203
22	FRA	Adelina Galyavieva / Louis Thauron	1399	2018/2019 season (70%)	(185)			142	127
23	GER	Katharina Müller / Tim Dieck	1291	2020/2021 season (100%)	200				
23	GER	Katharina Müller / Tim Dieck	1291	2019/2020 season (100%)	237			250	182
23	GER	Katharina Müller / Tim Dieck	1291	2018/2019 season (70%)		149		158	115
24	UKR	Oleksandra Nazarova / Maxim Nikitin	1289	2020/2021 season (100%)	162				
24	UKR	Oleksandra Nazarova / Maxim Nikitin	1289	2019/2020 season (100%)	325			250	243
24	UKR	Oleksandra Nazarova / Maxim Nikitin	1289	2018/2019 season (70%)	(113)	134		175	
25	RUS	Elizaveta Shanaeva / Devid Naryzhnyy	1224	2020/2021 season (100%)					
25	RUS	Elizaveta Shanaeva / Devid Naryzhnyy	1224	2019/2020 season (100%)	405	284	250		
25	RUS	Elizaveta Shanaeva / Devid Naryzhnyy	1224	2018/2019 season (70%)		158	127		
26	RUS	Sofia Shevchenko / Igor Eremenko	1167	2020/2021 season (100%)					
26	RUS	Sofia Shevchenko / Igor Eremenko	1167	2019/2020 season (100%)		213		250	
26	RUS	Sofia Shevchenko / Igor Eremenko	1167	2018/2019 season (70%)	284	245	175		
27	FRA	Loïcia Demougeot / Théo Le Mercier	1159	2020/2021 season (100%)					
27	FRA	Loïcia Demougeot / Théo Le Mercier	1159	2019/2020 season (100%)	295	230	225		
27	FRA	Loïcia Demougeot / Théo Le Mercier	1159	2018/2019 season (70%)	167	127	115		
28	JPN	Misato Komatsubara / Tim Koleto	1154	2020/2021 season (100%)	(180)				
28	JPN	Misato Komatsubara / Tim Koleto	1154	2019/2020 season (100%)	293				
28	JPN	Misato Komatsubara / Tim Koleto	1154	2018/2019 season (70%)	253	134	134	170	170
29	CHN	Chen Hong / Sun Zhuoming	1051	2020/2021 season (100%)					
29	CHN	Chen Hong / Sun Zhuoming	1051	2019/2020 season (100%)	325	191			
29	CHN	Chen Hong / Sun Zhuoming	1051	2018/2019 season (70%)	281			139	115
30	RUS	Anastasia Skoptsova / Kirill Aleshin	1026	2020/2021 season (100%)					
30	RUS	Anastasia Skoptsova / Kirill Aleshin	1026	2019/2020 season (100%)		213		250	225
30	RUS	Anastasia Skoptsova / Kirill Aleshin	1026	2018/2019 season (70%)		149		189	
31	UKR	Darya Popova / Volodymyr Byelikov	1018	2020/2021 season (100%)					
31	UKR	Darya Popova / Volodymyr Byelikov	1018	2019/2020 season (100%)				182	164
31	UKR	Darya Popova / Volodymyr Byelikov	1018	2018/2019 season (70%)	122	142	127	142	139
32	RUS	Arina Ushakova / Maxim Nekrasov	991	2020/2021 season (100%)					
32	RUS	Arina Ushakova / Maxim Nekrasov	991	2019/2020 season (100%)	365				
32	RUS	Arina Ushakova / Maxim Nekrasov	991	2018/2019 season (70%)	230	221	175		
33	RUS	Anastasia Shpilevaya / Grigory Smirnov	961	2020/2021 season (100%)					
33	RUS	Anastasia Shpilevaya / Grigory Smirnov	961	2019/2020 season (100%)		236		219	178
33	RUS	Anastasia Shpilevaya / Grigory Smirnov	961	2018/2019 season (70%)				175	153
34	FIN	Juulia Turkkila / Matthias Versluis	920	2020/2021 season (100%)					
34	FIN	Juulia Turkkila / Matthias Versluis	920	2019/2020 season (100%)				250	
34	FIN	Juulia Turkkila / Matthias Versluis	920	2018/2019 season (70%)	205	165		158	142
34	RUS	Diana Davis / Gleb Smolkin	920	2020/2021 season (100%)					
34	RUS	Diana Davis / Gleb Smolkin	920	2019/2020 season (100%)	328	225	225		
34	RUS	Diana Davis / Gleb Smolkin	920	2018/2019 season (70%)		142			
36	USA	Caroline Green / Michael Parsons	912	2020/2021 season (100%)					
36	USA	Caroline Green / Michael Parsons	912	2019/2020 season (100%)		213	213	243	243
36	USA	Caroline Green / Michael Parsons	912	2018/2019 season (70%)					
37	AUS	Chantelle Kerry / Andrew Dodds	892	2020/2021 season (100%)					
37	AUS	Chantelle Kerry / Andrew Dodds	892	2019/2020 season (100%)	214			182	
37	AUS	Chantelle Kerry / Andrew Dodds	892	2018/2019 season (70%)	228			153	115
38	GBR	Robynne Tweedale / Joseph Buckland	886	2020/2021 season (100%)					
38	GBR	Robynne Tweedale / Joseph Buckland	886	2019/2020 season (100%)				182	182
38	GBR	Robynne Tweedale / Joseph Buckland	886	2018/2019 season (70%)	109	149		139	125
39	CAN	Emmy Bronsard / Aissa Bouaraguia	831	2020/2021 season (100%)					
39	CAN	Emmy Bronsard / Aissa Bouaraguia	831	2019/2020 season (100%)	215	203	182		
39	CAN	Emmy Bronsard / Aissa Bouaraguia	831	2018/2019 season (70%)		127	104		
40	CAN	Natalie D'Alessandro / Bruce Waddell	812	2020/2021 season (100%)					
40	CAN	Natalie D'Alessandro / Bruce Waddell	812	2019/2020 season (100%)	174	225	182		
40	CAN	Natalie D'Alessandro / Bruce Waddell	812	2018/2019 season (70%)		127	104		
41	FRA	Evgeniia Lopareva / Geoffrey Brissaud	811	2020/2021 season (100%)	222				
41	FRA	Evgeniia Lopareva / Geoffrey Brissaud	811	2019/2020 season (100%)	192			219	178
41	FRA	Evgeniia Lopareva / Geoffrey Brissaud	811	2018/2019 season (70%)	(136)				
42	CZE	Natálie Taschlerová / Filip Taschler	807	2020/2021 season (100%)					
42	CZE	Natálie Taschlerová / Filip Taschler	807	2019/2020 season (100%)	126	203	164	225	
42	CZE	Natálie Taschlerová / Filip Taschler	807	2018/2019 season (70%)	89				
43	CHN	Ning Wanqi / Wang Chao	786	2020/2021 season (100%)					
43	CHN	Ning Wanqi / Wang Chao	786	2019/2020 season (100%)	264			178	
43	CHN	Ning Wanqi / Wang Chao	786	2018/2019 season (70%)	205			139	
44	KOR	Yura Min / Daniel Eaton	766	2020/2021 season (100%)					
44	KOR	Yura Min / Daniel Eaton	766	2019/2020 season (100%)	402			182	182
44	KOR	Yura Min / Daniel Eaton	766	2018/2019 season (70%)					
45	CAN	Kaitlyn Weaver / Andrew Poje	761	2020/2021 season (100%)					
45	CAN	Kaitlyn Weaver / Andrew Poje	761	2019/2020 season (100%)					
45	CAN	Kaitlyn Weaver / Andrew Poje	761	2018/2019 season (70%)	551				
46	GER	Jennifer Janse van Rensburg / Benjamin Steffan	700	2020/2021 season (100%)					
46	GER	Jennifer Janse van Rensburg / Benjamin Steffan	700	2019/2020 season (100%)				219	198
46	GER	Jennifer Janse van Rensburg / Benjamin Steffan	700	2018/2019 season (70%)				158	125
47	AUS	Matilda Friend / William Badaoui	699	2020/2021 season (100%)					
47	AUS	Matilda Friend / William Badaoui	699	2019/2020 season (100%)	192			178	
47	AUS	Matilda Friend / William Badaoui	699	2018/2019 season (70%)	185	76	68		
48	CAN	Miku Makita / Tyler Gunara	687	2020/2021 season (100%)					
48	CAN	Miku Makita / Tyler Gunara	687	2019/2020 season (100%)	239	182	182		
48	CAN	Miku Makita / Tyler Gunara	687	2018/2019 season (70%)		84			
49	UKR	Maria Golubtsova / Kirill Belobrov	654	2020/2021 season (100%)					
49	UKR	Maria Golubtsova / Kirill Belobrov	654	2019/2020 season (100%)	127	164	133		
49	UKR	Maria Golubtsova / Kirill Belobrov	654	2018/2019 season (70%)		115	115		
50	USA	Oona Brown / Gage Brown	651	2020/2021 season (100%)					
50	USA	Oona Brown / Gage Brown	651	2019/2020 season (100%)	194	164	133		
50	USA	Oona Brown / Gage Brown	651	2018/2019 season (70%)		115	115		
51	POL	Justyna Plutowska / Jérémie Flemin	642	2020/2021 season (100%)					
51	POL	Justyna Plutowska / Jérémie Flemin	642	2019/2020 season (100%)				198	178
51	POL	Justyna Plutowska / Jérémie Flemin	642	2018/2019 season (70%)				139	127
52	CAN	Molly Lanaghan / Dmitre Razgulajevs	635	2020/2021 season (100%)					
52	CAN	Molly Lanaghan / Dmitre Razgulajevs	635	2019/2020 season (100%)				219	164
52	CAN	Molly Lanaghan / Dmitre Razgulajevs	635	2018/2019 season (70%)				127	125
53	USA	Katarina Wolfkostin / Jeffrey Chen	612	2020/2021 season (100%)					
53	USA	Katarina Wolfkostin / Jeffrey Chen	612	2019/2020 season (100%)	266	182	164		
53	USA	Katarina Wolfkostin / Jeffrey Chen	612	2018/2019 season (70%)					
54	HUN	Emily Monaghan / Ilias Fourati	607	2020/2021 season (100%)					
54	HUN	Emily Monaghan / Ilias Fourati	607	2019/2020 season (100%)				203	164
54	HUN	Emily Monaghan / Ilias Fourati	607	2018/2019 season (70%)				125	115
55	HUN	Anna Yanovskaya / Ádám Lukács	589	2020/2021 season (100%)					
55	HUN	Anna Yanovskaya / Ádám Lukács	589	2019/2020 season (100%)					
55	HUN	Anna Yanovskaya / Ádám Lukács	589	2018/2019 season (70%)	126	149		175	139
56	ARM	Tina Garabedian / Simon Proulx-Sénécal	584	2020/2021 season (100%)					
56	ARM	Tina Garabedian / Simon Proulx-Sénécal	584	2019/2020 season (100%)	156			225	203
56	ARM	Tina Garabedian / Simon Proulx-Sénécal	584	2018/2019 season (70%)					
57	CAN	Alicia Fabbri / Paul Ayer	549	2020/2021 season (100%)					
57	CAN	Alicia Fabbri / Paul Ayer	549	2019/2020 season (100%)				178	
57	CAN	Alicia Fabbri / Paul Ayer	549	2018/2019 season (70%)	151	127	93		
58	FIN	Yuka Orihara / Juho Pirinen	546	2020/2021 season (100%)					
58	FIN	Yuka Orihara / Juho Pirinen	546	2019/2020 season (100%)	140			203	203
58	FIN	Yuka Orihara / Juho Pirinen	546	2018/2019 season (70%)					
59	FRA	Julia Wagret / Pierre Souquet-Basiege	523	2020/2021 season (100%)					
59	FRA	Julia Wagret / Pierre Souquet-Basiege	523	2019/2020 season (100%)				198	198
59	FRA	Julia Wagret / Pierre Souquet-Basiege	523	2018/2019 season (70%)				127	
60	CAN	Haley Sales / Nikolas Wamsteeker	498	2020/2021 season (100%)					
60	CAN	Haley Sales / Nikolas Wamsteeker	498	2019/2020 season (100%)				203	
60	CAN	Haley Sales / Nikolas Wamsteeker	498	2018/2019 season (70%)				153	142
61	ITA	Francesca Righi / Aleksei Dubrovin	497	2020/2021 season (100%)					
61	ITA	Francesca Righi / Aleksei Dubrovin	497	2019/2020 season (100%)		133	97		
61	ITA	Francesca Righi / Aleksei Dubrovin	497	2018/2019 season (70%)	99	84	84		
62	RUS	Annabelle Morozov / Andrei Bagin	489	2020/2021 season (100%)					
62	RUS	Annabelle Morozov / Andrei Bagin	489	2019/2020 season (100%)				270	219
62	RUS	Annabelle Morozov / Andrei Bagin	489	2018/2019 season (70%)					
63	FRA	Lou Terreaux / Noé Perron	466	2020/2021 season (100%)					
63	FRA	Lou Terreaux / Noé Perron	466	2019/2020 season (100%)	114	148	120		
63	FRA	Lou Terreaux / Noé Perron	466	2018/2019 season (70%)		84			
64	CAN	Nadiia Bashynska / Peter Beaumont	461	2020/2021 season (100%)					
64	CAN	Nadiia Bashynska / Peter Beaumont	461	2019/2020 season (100%)		203	182		
64	CAN	Nadiia Bashynska / Peter Beaumont	461	2018/2019 season (70%)		76			
65	RUS	Sofya Tyutyunina / Alexander Shustitskiy	428	2020/2021 season (100%)					
65	RUS	Sofya Tyutyunina / Alexander Shustitskiy	428	2019/2020 season (100%)		225	203		
65	RUS	Sofya Tyutyunina / Alexander Shustitskiy	428	2018/2019 season (70%)					
66	RUS	Ekaterina Katashinskaia / Alexander Vaskovich	406	2020/2021 season (100%)					
66	RUS	Ekaterina Katashinskaia / Alexander Vaskovich	406	2019/2020 season (100%)		203	203		
66	RUS	Ekaterina Katashinskaia / Alexander Vaskovich	406	2018/2019 season (70%)					
67	GBR	Emily Rose Brown / James Hernandez	399	2020/2021 season (100%)					
67	GBR	Emily Rose Brown / James Hernandez	399	2019/2020 season (100%)	141	97			
67	GBR	Emily Rose Brown / James Hernandez	399	2018/2019 season (70%)		93	68		
68	BLR	Emiliya Kalehanova / Uladzislau Palkhouski	375	2020/2021 season (100%)					
68	BLR	Emiliya Kalehanova / Uladzislau Palkhouski	375	2019/2020 season (100%)					
68	BLR	Emiliya Kalehanova / Uladzislau Palkhouski	375	2018/2019 season (70%)	80	104	76	115	
69	GBR	Sasha Fear / George Waddell	374	2020/2021 season (100%)					
69	GBR	Sasha Fear / George Waddell	374	2019/2020 season (100%)		120	120		
69	GBR	Sasha Fear / George Waddell	374	2018/2019 season (70%)	58	76			
70	AUS	Holly Harris / Jason Chan	362	2020/2021 season (100%)					
70	AUS	Holly Harris / Jason Chan	362	2019/2020 season (100%)	362				
70	AUS	Holly Harris / Jason Chan	362	2018/2019 season (70%)					
71	HUN	Leia Dozzi / Michael Albert Valdez	346	2020/2021 season (100%)					
71	HUN	Leia Dozzi / Michael Albert Valdez	346	2019/2020 season (100%)				182	164
71	HUN	Leia Dozzi / Michael Albert Valdez	346	2018/2019 season (70%)					
72	ITA	Carolina Portesi Peroni / Michael Chrastecky	362	2020/2021 season (100%)					
72	ITA	Carolina Portesi Peroni / Michael Chrastecky	362	2019/2020 season (100%)	93	133	108		
72	ITA	Carolina Portesi Peroni / Michael Chrastecky	362	2018/2019 season (70%)					
73	USA	Ella Ales / Daniel Tsarik	312	2020/2021 season (100%)					
73	USA	Ella Ales / Daniel Tsarik	312	2019/2020 season (100%)		164	148		
73	USA	Ella Ales / Daniel Tsarik	312	2018/2019 season (70%)					
74	USA	Molly Cesanek / Yehor Yehorov	296	2020/2021 season (100%)					
74	USA	Molly Cesanek / Yehor Yehorov	296	2019/2020 season (100%)		148	148		
74	USA	Molly Cesanek / Yehor Yehorov	296	2018/2019 season (70%)					
75	USA	Katarina DelCamp / Ian Somerville	279	2020/2021 season (100%)					
75	USA	Katarina DelCamp / Ian Somerville	279	2019/2020 season (100%)		182	97		
75	USA	Katarina DelCamp / Ian Somerville	279	2018/2019 season (70%)					
76	FRA	Marie Dupayage / Thomas Nabais	266	2020/2021 season (100%)					
76	FRA	Marie Dupayage / Thomas Nabais	266	2019/2020 season (100%)		133	133		
76	FRA	Marie Dupayage / Thomas Nabais	266	2018/2019 season (70%)					
77	ISR	Mariia Nosovitskaya / Mikhail Nosovitskiy	241	2020/2021 season (100%)					
77	ISR	Mariia Nosovitskaya / Mikhail Nosovitskiy	241	2019/2020 season (100%)		133	108		
77	ISR	Mariia Nosovitskaya / Mikhail Nosovitskiy	241	2018/2019 season (70%)					
78	JPN	Rikako Fukase / Eichu Oliver Cho	237	2020/2021 season (100%)					
78	JPN	Rikako Fukase / Eichu Oliver Cho	237	2019/2020 season (100%)	237				
78	JPN	Rikako Fukase / Eichu Oliver Cho	237	2018/2019 season (70%)					
79	SUI	Victoria Manni / Carlo Röthlisberger	228	2020/2021 season (100%)					
79	SUI	Victoria Manni / Carlo Röthlisberger	228	2019/2020 season (100%)	113				
79	SUI	Victoria Manni / Carlo Röthlisberger	228	2018/2019 season (70%)				115	
80	GER	Anne-Marie Wolf / Max Liebers	362	2020/2021 season (100%)					
80	GER	Anne-Marie Wolf / Max Liebers	362	2019/2020 season (100%)		120	97		
80	GER	Anne-Marie Wolf / Max Liebers	362	2018/2019 season (70%)					
81	USA	Sophia Elder / Christopher Elder	362	2020/2021 season (100%)					
81	USA	Sophia Elder / Christopher Elder	362	2019/2020 season (100%)					
81	USA	Sophia Elder / Christopher Elder	362	2018/2019 season (70%)		104	104		
82	FRA	Natacha Lagouge / Arnaud Caffa	203	2020/2021 season (100%)					
82	FRA	Natacha Lagouge / Arnaud Caffa	203	2019/2020 season (100%)				203	
82	FRA	Natacha Lagouge / Arnaud Caffa	203	2018/2019 season (70%)					
82	RUS	Angelina Lazareva / Maksim Prokofiev	203	2020/2021 season (100%)					
82	RUS	Angelina Lazareva / Maksim Prokofiev	203	2019/2020 season (100%)		203			
82	RUS	Angelina Lazareva / Maksim Prokofiev	203	2018/2019 season (70%)					
84	CAN	Olivia McIsaac / Corey Circelli	201	2020/2021 season (100%)					
84	CAN	Olivia McIsaac / Corey Circelli	201	2019/2020 season (100%)		108			
84	CAN	Olivia McIsaac / Corey Circelli	201	2018/2019 season (70%)		93			
85	HUN	Villő Marton / Danyil Semko	195	2020/2021 season (100%)					
85	HUN	Villő Marton / Danyil Semko	195	2019/2020 season (100%)	75	120			
85	HUN	Villő Marton / Danyil Semko	195	2018/2019 season (70%)					
86	KAZ	Maxine Weatherby / Temirlan Yerzhanov	173	2020/2021 season (100%)					
86	KAZ	Maxine Weatherby / Temirlan Yerzhanov	173	2019/2020 season (100%)	173				
86	KAZ	Maxine Weatherby / Temirlan Yerzhanov	173	2018/2019 season (70%)					
87	CYP	Angelina Kudryavtseva / Ilia Karankevich	165	2020/2021 season (100%)					
87	CYP	Angelina Kudryavtseva / Ilia Karankevich	165	2019/2020 season (100%)	68	97			
87	CYP	Angelina Kudryavtseva / Ilia Karankevich	165	2018/2019 season (70%)					
88	EST	Katerina Bunina / Artur Gruzdev	164	2020/2021 season (100%)					
88	EST	Katerina Bunina / Artur Gruzdev	164	2019/2020 season (100%)		164			
88	EST	Katerina Bunina / Artur Gruzdev	164	2018/2019 season (70%)					
88	RUS	Julia Tultseva / Anatoliy Belovodchenko	164	2020/2021 season (100%)					
88	RUS	Julia Tultseva / Anatoliy Belovodchenko	164	2019/2020 season (100%)				164	
88	RUS	Julia Tultseva / Anatoliy Belovodchenko	164	2018/2019 season (70%)					
90	RUS	Tamara Zhukova / Daniil Karpov	148	2020/2021 season (100%)					
90	RUS	Tamara Zhukova / Daniil Karpov	148	2019/2020 season (100%)		148			
90	RUS	Tamara Zhukova / Daniil Karpov	148	2018/2019 season (70%)					
91	RUS	Alla Loboda / Anton Shibnev	142	2020/2021 season (100%)					
91	RUS	Alla Loboda / Anton Shibnev	142	2019/2020 season (100%)					
91	RUS	Alla Loboda / Anton Shibnev	142	2018/2019 season (70%)				142	
92	PRK	Phyo Yong-myong / Choe Min	125	2020/2021 season (100%)					
92	PRK	Phyo Yong-myong / Choe Min	125	2019/2020 season (100%)					
92	PRK	Phyo Yong-myong / Choe Min	125	2018/2019 season (70%)				125	
93	RUS	Svetlana Lizunova / Alexander Vakhnov	195	2020/2021 season (100%)					
93	RUS	Svetlana Lizunova / Alexander Vakhnov	195	2019/2020 season (100%)		120			
93	RUS	Svetlana Lizunova / Alexander Vakhnov	195	2018/2019 season (70%)					
94	RUS	Ekaterina Andreeva / Ivan Desyatov	115	2020/2021 season (100%)					
94	RUS	Ekaterina Andreeva / Ivan Desyatov	115	2019/2020 season (100%)					
94	RUS	Ekaterina Andreeva / Ivan Desyatov	115	2018/2019 season (70%)		115			
94	RUS	Anastasia Shakun / Daniil Ragimov	115	2020/2021 season (100%)					
94	RUS	Anastasia Shakun / Daniil Ragimov	115	2019/2020 season (100%)					
94	RUS	Anastasia Shakun / Daniil Ragimov	115	2018/2019 season (70%)				115	
96	CAN	Jessica Li / Jacob Richmond	108	2020/2021 season (100%)					
96	CAN	Jessica Li / Jacob Richmond	108	2019/2020 season (100%)		108			
96	CAN	Jessica Li / Jacob Richmond	108	2018/2019 season (70%)					
96	KAZ	Anna Shnaider / Fedor Varlamov	108	2020/2021 season (100%)					
96	KAZ	Anna Shnaider / Fedor Varlamov	108	2019/2020 season (100%)		108			
96	KAZ	Anna Shnaider / Fedor Varlamov	108	2018/2019 season (70%)					
98	FRA	Emily Bratti / Mathieu Couyras	97	2020/2021 season (100%)					
98	FRA	Emily Bratti / Mathieu Couyras	97	2019/2020 season (100%)		97			
98	FRA	Emily Bratti / Mathieu Couyras	97	2018/2019 season (70%)					
98	FRA	Celina Fradji / Jean-Hans Fourneaux	97	2020/2021 season (100%)					
98	FRA	Celina Fradji / Jean-Hans Fourneaux	97	2019/2020 season (100%)		97			
98	FRA	Celina Fradji / Jean-Hans Fourneaux	97	2018/2019 season (70%)					
100	ESP	Sofia Val / Linus Colmor Jepsen	83	2020/2021 season (100%)					
100	ESP	Sofia Val / Linus Colmor Jepsen	83	2019/2020 season (100%)	83				
100	ESP	Sofia Val / Linus Colmor Jepsen	83	2018/2019 season (70%)					
101	CHN	Chen Xizi / Xing Jianing	68	2020/2021 season (100%)					
101	CHN	Chen Xizi / Xing Jianing	68	2019/2020 season (100%)					
101	CHN	Chen Xizi / Xing Jianing	68	2018/2019 season (70%)		68			
102	ARM	Viktoriia Azroian / Aleksandr Siroshtan	48	2020/2021 season (100%)					
102	ARM	Viktoriia Azroian / Aleksandr Siroshtan	48	2019/2020 season (100%)					
102	ARM	Viktoriia Azroian / Aleksandr Siroshtan	48	2018/2019 season (70%)	48				

=== Season standings ===
==== Men ====
As of March 27, 2021

Rank	Nation	Couple	Points	Season	ISU Championships or Olympics	(Junior) Grand Prix and Final		Selected International Competition	
Rank	Nation	Couple	Points	Season	Best	Best	2nd Best	Best	2nd Best
1	USA	Nathan Chen	1200	2020/2021 season (100%)	1200				
2	JPN	Yuma Kagiyama	1080	2020/2021 season (100%)	1080				
3	JPN	Yuzuru Hanyu	972	2020/2021 season (100%)	972				
4	JPN	Shoma Uno	875	2020/2021 season (100%)	875				
5	RUS	Mikhail Kolyada	787	2020/2021 season (100%)	787				
6	CAN	Keegan Messing	709	2020/2021 season (100%)	709				
7	USA	Jason Brown	638	2020/2021 season (100%)	638				
8	RUS	Evgeni Semenenko	574	2020/2021 season (100%)	574				
9	FRA	Kévin Aymoz	517	2020/2021 season (100%)	517				
10	KOR	Cha Jun-hwan	465	2020/2021 season (100%)	465				
11	ITA	Matteo Rizzo	418	2020/2021 season (100%)	418				
12	ITA	Daniel Grassl	377	2020/2021 season (100%)	377				
13	CHN	Yan Han	339	2020/2021 season (100%)	339				
14	GEO	Morisi Kvitelashvili	305	2020/2021 season (100%)	305				
15	SUI	Lukas Britschgi	275	2020/2021 season (100%)	275				
16	EST	Aleksandr Selevko	247	2020/2021 season (100%)	247				
17	BLR	Konstantin Milyukov	222	2020/2021 season (100%)	222				
18	LAT	Deniss Vasiļjevs	200	2020/2021 season (100%)	200				
19	CZE	Michal Březina	180	2020/2021 season (100%)	180				
20	MEX	Donovan Carrillo	162	2020/2021 season (100%)	162				
21	UKR	Ivan Shmuratko	146	2020/2021 season (100%)	146				
22	CHN	Jin Boyang	131	2020/2021 season (100%)	131				
23	SWE	Nikolaj Majorov	118	2020/2021 season (100%)	118				
24	ISR	Alexei Bychenko	106	2020/2021 season (100%)	106				

==== Ladies ====
As of March 26, 2021

Rank	Nation	Couple	Points	Season	ISU Championships or Olympics	(Junior) Grand Prix and Final		Selected International Competition	
Rank	Nation	Couple	Points	Season	Best	Best	2nd Best	Best	2nd Best
1	RUS	Anna Shcherbakova	1200	2020/2021 season (100%)	1200				
2	RUS	Elizaveta Tuktamysheva	1080	2020/2021 season (100%)	1080				
3	RUS	Alexandra Trusova	972	2020/2021 season (100%)	972				
4	USA	Karen Chen	875	2020/2021 season (100%)	875				
5	BEL	Loena Hendrickx	787	2020/2021 season (100%)	787				
6	JPN	Kaori Sakamoto	709	2020/2021 season (100%)	709				
7	JPN	Rika Kihira	638	2020/2021 season (100%)	638				
8	AUT	Olga Mikutina	574	2020/2021 season (100%)	574				
9	USA	Bradie Tennell	517	2020/2021 season (100%)	517				
10	KOR	Lee Hae-in	465	2020/2021 season (100%)	465				
11	KOR	Kim Ye-lim	418	2020/2021 season (100%)	418				
12	AZE	Ekaterina Ryabova	377	2020/2021 season (100%)	377				
13	CAN	Madeline Schizas	339	2020/2021 season (100%)	339				
14	EST	Eva-Lotta Kiibus	305	2020/2021 season (100%)	305				
15	SWE	Josefin Taljegård	275	2020/2021 season (100%)	275				
16	NED	Lindsay van Zundert	247	2020/2021 season (100%)	247				
17	BUL	Alexandra Feigin	222	2020/2021 season (100%)	222				
18	GER	Nicole Schott	200	2020/2021 season (100%)	200				
19	JPN	Satoko Miyahara	180	2020/2021 season (100%)	180				
20	GEO	Alina Urushadze	162	2020/2021 season (100%)	162				
21	CHN	Chen Hongyi	146	2020/2021 season (100%)	146				
22	CZE	Eliška Březinová	131	2020/2021 season (100%)	131				
23	GBR	Natasha McKay	118	2020/2021 season (100%)	118				
24	FIN	Jenni Saarinen	106	2020/2021 season (100%)	106				

==== Pairs ====
As of March 25, 2021

Rank	Nation	Couple	Points	Season	ISU Championships or Olympics	(Junior) Grand Prix and Final		Selected International Competition	
Rank	Nation	Couple	Points	Season	Best	Best	2nd Best	Best	2nd Best
1	RUS	Anastasia Mishina / Aleksandr Galliamov	1200	2020/2021 season (100%)	1200				
2	CHN	Sui Wenjing / Han Cong	1080	2020/2021 season (100%)	1080				
3	RUS	Aleksandra Boikova / Dmitrii Kozlovskii	972	2020/2021 season (100%)	972				
4	RUS	Evgenia Tarasova / Vladimir Morozov	875	2020/2021 season (100%)	875				
5	CHN	Peng Cheng / Jin Yang	787	2020/2021 season (100%)	787				
6	CAN	Kirsten Moore-Towers / Michael Marinaro	709	2020/2021 season (100%)	709				
7	USA	Alexa Knierim / Brandon Frazier	638	2020/2021 season (100%)	638				
8	ITA	Nicole Della Monica / Matteo Guarise	574	2020/2021 season (100%)	574				
9	USA	Ashley Cain-Gribble / Timothy LeDuc	517	2020/2021 season (100%)	517				
10	JPN	Riku Miura / Ryuichi Kihara	465	2020/2021 season (100%)	465				
11	AUT	Miriam Ziegler / Severin Kiefer	418	2020/2021 season (100%)	418				
12	CAN	Evelyn Walsh / Trennt Michaud	377	2020/2021 season (100%)	377				
13	GER	Annika Hocke / Robert Kunkel	339	2020/2021 season (100%)	339				
14	HUN	Ioulia Chtchetinina / Márk Magyar	305	2020/2021 season (100%)	305				
15	CZE	Elizaveta Zhuk / Martin Bidař	275	2020/2021 season (100%)	275				
16	GEO	Anastasiia Metelkina / Daniil Parkman	247	2020/2021 season (100%)	247				
17	ITA	Rebecca Ghilardi / Filippo Ambrosini	222	2020/2021 season (100%)	222				
18	BLR	Bogdana Lukashevich / Alexander Stepanov	200	2020/2021 season (100%)	200				
19	ISR	Anna Vernikov / Evgeni Krasnopolski	180	2020/2021 season (100%)	180				
20	FRA	Cléo Hamon / Denys Strekalin	162	2020/2021 season (100%)	162				

==== Ice dance ====
As of March 27, 2021

Rank	Nation	Couple	Points	Season	ISU Championships or Olympics	(Junior) Grand Prix and Final		Selected International Competition	
Rank	Nation	Couple	Points	Season	Best	Best	2nd Best	Best	2nd Best
1	RUS	Victoria Sinitsina / Nikita Katsalapov	1200	2020/2021 season (100%)	1200				
2	USA	Madison Hubbell / Zachary Donohue	1080	2020/2021 season (100%)	1080				
3	CAN	Piper Gilles / Paul Poirier	972	2020/2021 season (100%)	972				
4	USA	Madison Chock / Evan Bates	875	2020/2021 season (100%)	875				
5	RUS	Alexandra Stepanova / Ivan Bukin	787	2020/2021 season (100%)	787				
6	ITA	Charlène Guignard / Marco Fabbri	709	2020/2021 season (100%)	709				
7	GBR	Lilah Fear / Lewis Gibson	638	2020/2021 season (100%)	638				
8	CAN	Laurence Fournier Beaudry / Nikolaj Sørensen	574	2020/2021 season (100%)	574				
9	USA	Kaitlin Hawayek / Jean-Luc Baker	517	2020/2021 season (100%)	517				
10	RUS	Tiffany Zahorski / Jonathan Guerreiro	465	2020/2021 season (100%)	465				
11	ESP	Sara Hurtado / Kirill Khaliavin	418	2020/2021 season (100%)	418				
12	POL	Natalia Kaliszek / Maksym Spodyriev	377	2020/2021 season (100%)	377				
13	CHN	Wang Shiyue / Liu Xinyu	339	2020/2021 season (100%)	339				
14	CAN	Marjorie Lajoie / Zachary Lagha	305	2020/2021 season (100%)	305				
15	LTU	Allison Reed / Saulius Ambrulevičius	275	2020/2021 season (100%)	275				
16	FRA	Adelina Galyavieva / Louis Thauron	247	2020/2021 season (100%)	247				
17	FRA	Evgeniia Lopareva / Geoffrey Brissaud	222	2020/2021 season (100%)	222				
18	GER	Katharina Müller / Tim Dieck	200	2020/2021 season (100%)	200				
19	JPN	Misato Komatsubara / Tim Koleto	180	2020/2021 season (100%)	180				
20	UKR	Oleksandra Nazarova / Maksym Nikitin	162	2020/2021 season (100%)	162				

== World standings for synchronized skating ==
=== Season-end standings ===
The remainder of this section is a complete list, by level, published by the ISU.

==== Senior Synchronized (54 teams) ====
Source:

==== Junior Synchronized (61 teams) ====
Source:

== See also ==
- ISU World Standings
- ISU Season's World Ranking
- 2020–21 figure skating season
