= 2021–22 ISU Grand Prix of Figure Skating =

- Type: Grand Prix
- Date: October 22 – December 12, 2021
- Season: 2021–22
- Previous: 2020–21 Grand Prix
- Next: 2022–23 Grand Prix

The 2021–22 ISU Grand Prix of Figure Skating was a series of senior international competitions organized by the International Skating Union that were held from October 2021 through December 2021. Medals were awarded in men's singles, women's singles, pair skating, and ice dance. Skaters earned points based on their placements at each event and the top six in each discipline qualified to compete at the Grand Prix Final in Osaka, Japan, although the Grand Prix Final was ultimately cancelled due to the COVID-19 pandemic. The corresponding series for junior-level skaters was the 2021–22 ISU Junior Grand Prix.

== Schedule ==
The Chinese Skating Association informed the ISU that they could no longer host the Cup of China due to travel restrictions and quarantine requirements related to the COVID-19 pandemic and cancelled the event on August 16, 2021. The Gran Premio d'Italia was announced as the replacement on August 27, 2021.

Because of the COVID-19 pandemic, the Grand Prix Final was cancelled on December 2, 2021, with the possibility of a postponement, before it was definitively cancelled on December 17, 2021.

The series included the following events.

Date	Event	Location	Results
October 22–24	(United States) 2021 Skate America	Las Vegas, Nevada, United States	Details
October 29–31	2021 Skate Canada International	Vancouver, British Columbia, Canada	Details
November 5–7	2021 Cup of China	Cancelled	
November 5–7	(Italy) 2021 Gran Premio d'Italia	Turin, Italy	Details
November 12–14	(Japan) 2021 NHK Trophy	Tokyo, Japan	Details
November 19–21	2021 Internationaux de France	Grenoble, France	Details
November 26–28	(Russia) 2021 Rostelecom Cup	Sochi, Russia	Details
December 10–12	(Japan) 2021–22 Grand Prix Final	Cancelled	

== Requirements ==
Skaters were eligible to compete on the senior Grand Prix circuit if they had reached the age of 15 before July 1, 2021. They were also required to have earned a minimum total score at certain international events.

== Assignments ==
Assignments were released on June 29, 2021.

=== Men's singles ===
Nation	Skater	Assignment(s)	
Canada	Keegan Messing	Skate Canada International	Internationaux de France
Canada	Nam Nguyen	Skate America	NHK Trophy
Canada	Roman Sadovsky	Skate Canada International	Rostelecom Cup
Czech Republic	Michal Březina	Skate America	Rostelecom Cup
France	Kévin Aymoz	Skate America	Internationaux de France
France	Adam Siao Him Fa	Skate America	Internationaux de France
Georgia	Morisi Kvitelashvili	Skate Canada International	Rostelecom Cup
Italy	Gabriele Frangipani	Gran Premio d'Italia	Internationaux de France
Italy	Daniel Grassl	Skate America	Gran Premio d'Italia
Italy	Matteo Rizzo	NHK Trophy	Rostelecom Cup
Japan	Yuma Kagiyama	Gran Premio d'Italia	Internationaux de France
Japan	Shun Sato	Skate America	Internationaux de France
Japan	Keiji Tanaka	Skate Canada International	Rostelecom Cup
Japan	Kazuki Tomono	Gran Premio d'Italia	Rostelecom Cup
Japan	Shoma Uno	Skate America	NHK Trophy
Japan	Sōta Yamamoto	Skate Canada International	NHK Trophy
Latvia	Deniss Vasiļjevs	Gran Premio d'Italia	Internationaux de France
Russia	Dmitri Aliev	Gran Premio d'Italia	Internationaux de France
Russia	Artur Danielian	Skate America	Internationaux de France
Russia	Mikhail Kolyada	Gran Premio d'Italia	Rostelecom Cup
Russia	Makar Ignatov	Skate Canada International	NHK Trophy
Russia	Alexander Samarin	Skate Canada International	NHK Trophy
Russia	Evgeni Semenenko	Skate Canada International	Rostelecom Cup
South Korea	Cha Jun-hwan	Gran Premio d'Italia	NHK Trophy
United States	Jason Brown	Skate Canada International	Internationaux de France
United States	Nathan Chen	Skate America	Skate Canada
United States	Tomoki Hiwatashi	Skate Canada International	NHK Trophy
United States	Camden Pulkinen	NHK Trophy	Rostelecom Cup
United States	Vincent Zhou	Skate America	NHK Trophy
Australia	Brendan Kerry	Rostelecom Cup	
Canada	Conrad Orzel	Skate Canada International	
China	Chen Yudong	Gran Premio d'Italia	
China	Jin Boyang	Gran Premio d'Italia	
France	Romain Ponsart	Internationaux de France	
Georgia	Nika Egadze	Rostelecom Cup	
Germany	Paul Fentz	Gran Premio d'Italia	
Japan	Kao Miura	NHK Trophy	
Russia	Petr Gumennik	Gran Premio d'Italia	
Russia	Mark Kondratiuk	Rostelecom Cup	
Russia	Andrei Mozalev	Internationaux de France	
United States	Jimmy Ma	Skate America	

=== Women's singles ===
Nation	Skater	Assignment(s)	
Azerbaijan	Ekaterina Ryabova	Internationaux de France	Rostelecom Cup
Belgium	Loena Hendrickx	Gran Premio d'Italia	Rostelecom Cup
Canada	Madeline Schizas	Skate Canada International	Rostelecom Cup
Germany	Nicole Schott	Gran Premio d'Italia	NHK Trophy
Japan	Wakaba Higuchi	Skate Canada International	Internationaux de France
Japan	Mana Kawabe	Skate Canada International	NHK Trophy
Japan	Rino Matsuike	NHK Trophy	Rostelecom Cup
Japan	Mai Mihara	Skate Canada International	Gran Premio d'Italia
Japan	Satoko Miyahara	Skate America	Gran Premio d'Italia
Japan	Kaori Sakamoto	Skate America	NHK Trophy
Japan	Yuhana Yokoi	Skate America	Internationaux de France
Poland	Ekaterina Kurakova	Skate America	Rostelecom Cup
Russia	Maiia Khromykh	Gran Premio d'Italia	Rostelecom Cup
Russia	Alena Kostornaia	Skate Canada International	Internationaux de France
Russia	Anna Shcherbakova	Gran Premio d'Italia	Internationaux de France
Russia	Kseniia Sinitsyna	Skate America	Internationaux de France
Russia	Elizaveta Tuktamysheva	Skate Canada International	Rostelecom Cup
Russia	Kamila Valieva	Skate Canada International	Rostelecom Cup
South Korea	Kim Ye-lim	Skate America	Gran Premio d'Italia
South Korea	Lee Hae-in	Skate Canada International	Internationaux de France
South Korea	Lim Eun-soo	Gran Premio d'Italia	NHK Trophy
South Korea	You Young	Skate America	NHK Trophy
United States	Starr Andrews	Skate America	Internationaux de France
United States	Mariah Bell	Internationaux de France	Rostelecom Cup
United States	Karen Chen	Skate Canada International	Internationaux de France
United States	Amber Glenn	Skate America	NHK Trophy
United States	Alysa Liu	Skate Canada International	NHK Trophy
Austria	Olga Mikutina	Rostelecom Cup	
Belarus	Viktoriia Safonova	Rostelecom Cup	
Canada	Emily Bausback	Skate Canada International	
Canada	Alison Schumacher	Skate Canada International	
China	Zhu Yi	Gran Premio d'Italia	
Estonia	Eva-Lotta Kiibus	Rostelecom Cup	
France	Léa Serna	Internationaux de France	
Italy	Lucrezia Beccari	Gran Premio d'Italia	
Italy	Lara Naki Gutmann	Gran Premio d'Italia	
Russia	Sofia Samodurova	Gran Premio d'Italia	
Russia	Alexandra Trusova	Skate America	
Russia	Daria Usacheva	Skate America	
South Korea	Park Yeon-jeong	Internationaux de France	
South Korea	Wi Seo-yeong	NHK Trophy	
United States	Audrey Shin	Skate America	

=== Pairs ===
Nation	Team	Assignment(s)	
Canada	Vanessa James / Eric Radford	Skate Canada International	Internationaux de France
Canada	Kirsten Moore-Towers / Michael Marinaro	Skate Canada International	Rostelecom Cup
Canada	Evelyn Walsh / Trennt Michaud	Skate America	NHK Trophy
China	Sui Wenjing / Han Cong	Skate Canada International	Gran Premio d'Italia
Germany	Minerva Fabienne Hase / Nolan Seegert	Skate Canada International	NHK Trophy
Hungary	Ioulia Chtchetinina / Márk Magyar	Internationaux de France	Rostelecom Cup
Italy	Nicole Della Monica / Matteo Guarise	Gran Premio d'Italia	Rostelecom Cup
Italy	Rebecca Ghilardi / Filippo Ambrosini	Gran Premio d'Italia	Internationaux de France
Japan	Riku Miura / Ryuichi Kihara	Skate America	NHK Trophy
Russia	Iuliia Artemeva / Mikhail Nazarychev	Gran Premio d'Italia	Internationaux de France
Russia	Aleksandra Boikova / Dmitrii Kozlovskii	Skate America	Internationaux de France
Russia	Anastasia Mishina / Aleksandr Galliamov	NHK Trophy	Rostelecom Cup
Russia	Daria Pavliuchenko / Denis Khodykin	Skate Canada International	Rostelecom Cup
Russia	Alina Pepeleva / Roman Pleshkov	Skate America	Gran Premio d'Italia
Russia	Evgenia Tarasova / Vladimir Morozov	Skate America	NHK Trophy
United States	Ashley Cain-Gribble / Timothy LeDuc	Skate Canada International	NHK Trophy
United States	Alexa Knierim / Brandon Frazier	Skate America	Internationaux de France
United States	Audrey Lu / Misha Mitrofanov	NHK Trophy	Rostelecom Cup
Austria	Miriam Ziegler / Severin Kiefer	Rostelecom Cup	
Canada	Lori-Ann Matte / Thierry Ferland	Skate Canada International	
China	Peng Cheng / Jin Yang	Gran Premio d'Italia	
France	Coline Keriven / Noël-Antoine Pierre	Internationaux de France	
France	Camille Kovalev / Pavel Kovalev	Internationaux de France	
Germany	Annika Hocke / Robert Kunkel	Gran Premio d'Italia	
Great Britain	Zoe Jones / Christopher Boyadji	Skate Canada International	
Italy	Sara Conti / Niccolò Macii	Gran Premio d'Italia	
Russia	Yasmina Kadyrova / Ivan Balchenko	Rostelecom Cup	
United States	Jessica Calalang / Brian Johnson	Skate America	
United States	Chelsea Liu / Danny O'Shea	Skate America	

=== Ice dance ===
Nation	Team	Assignment(s)	
Canada	Laurence Fournier Beaudry / Nikolaj Sørensen	Skate America	Rostelecom Cup
Canada	Piper Gilles / Paul Poirier	Skate Canada International	Internationaux de France
Canada	Marjorie Lajoie / Zachary Lagha	Skate Canada International	NHK Trophy
Canada	Carolane Soucisse / Shane Firus	Skate America	Gran Premio d'Italia
France	Evgeniia Lopareva / Geoffrey Brissaud	Gran Premio d'Italia	Internationaux de France
France	Gabriella Papadakis / Guillaume Cizeron	Gran Premio d'Italia	Internationaux de France
Great Britain	Lilah Fear / Lewis Gibson	Skate Canada International	NHK Trophy
Italy	Charlène Guignard / Marco Fabbri	Skate Canada International	Rostelecom Cup
Japan	Misato Komatsubara / Tim Koleto	Skate America	NHK Trophy
Lithuania	Allison Reed / Saulius Ambrulevičius	Internationaux de France	Rostelecom Cup
Russia	Annabelle Morozov / Andrei Bagin	Skate America	Internationaux de France
Russia	Victoria Sinitsina / Nikita Katsalapov	NHK Trophy	Rostelecom Cup
Russia	Alexandra Stepanova / Ivan Bukin	Gran Premio d'Italia	Internationaux de France
Spain	Sara Hurtado / Kirill Khaliavin	NHK Trophy	Rostelecom Cup
Spain	Olivia Smart / Adrián Díaz	Skate America	Skate Canada
United States	Christina Carreira / Anthony Ponomarenko	Skate Canada International	Internationaux de France
United States	Madison Chock / Evan Bates	Skate America	NHK Trophy
United States	Caroline Green / Michael Parsons	Skate Canada International	Gran Premio d'Italia
United States	Madison Hubbell / Zachary Donohue	Skate America	Gran Premio d'Italia
Canada	Haley Sales / Nikolas Wamsteeker	Skate Canada International	
China	Chen Hong / Sun Zhuoming	Gran Premio d'Italia	
China	Wang Shiyue / Liu Xinyu	Gran Premio d'Italia	
Finland	Juulia Turkkila / Matthias Versluis	Internationaux de France	
France	Loïcia Demougeot / Théo Le Mercier	Internationaux de France	
Germany	Jennifer Janse van Rensburg / Benjamin Steffan	Internationaux de France	
Germany	Katharina Müller / Tim Dieck	Gran Premio d'Italia	
Italy	Carolina Moscheni / Francesco Fioretti	Gran Premio d'Italia	
Japan	Kana Muramoto / Daisuke Takahashi	NHK Trophy	
Poland	Natalia Kaliszek / Maksym Spodyriev	Skate America	
Russia	Diana Davis / Gleb Smolkin	Skate Canada International	
Russia	Elizaveta Khudaiberdieva / Egor Bazin	Rostelecom Cup	
Russia	Elizaveta Shanaeva / Devid Naryzhnyy	Skate Canada International	
Russia	Sofia Shevchenko / Igor Eremenko	NHK Trophy	
Russia	Anastasia Skoptsova / Kirill Aleshin	Rostelecom Cup	
Ukraine	Oleksandra Nazarova / Maxim Nikitin	NHK Trophy	
United States	Molly Cesanek / Yehor Yehorov	Skate America	
United States	Kaitlin Hawayek / Jean-Luc Baker	Rostelecom Cup	

=== Changes to preliminary assignments ===
==== Skate America ====
Discipline	Withdrew		Added		Notes	Ref.
Discipline	Date	Skater(s)	Date	Skater(s)	Notes	Ref.
Men	—N/a		September 2	(United States) Yaroslav Paniot	Host picks	
Women	—N/a		September 2	(United States) Audrey Shin	Host picks	
Pairs	—N/a		September 2	(United States) Jessica Calalang / Brian Johnson	Host picks	
Ice dance	—N/a		September 2	(United States) Molly Cesanek / Yehor Yehorov	Host picks	
Men	October 11	(Russia) Daniil Samsonov	—N/a		Medical reasons	
Men	October 11	(United States) Yaroslav Paniot	October 11	(United States) Jimmy Ma		
Ice dance	October 13	(Russia) Tiffany Zahorski / Jonathan Guerreiro	—N/a		Hospitalization (Zahorski)	
Women	October 18	(United States) Bradie Tennell	October 18	(United States) Starr Andrews	Injury	

==== Skate Canada International ====
Discipline	Withdrew		Added		Notes	Ref.
Discipline	Date	Skater(s)	Date	Skater(s)	Notes	Ref.
Men	—N/a		September 16	(Canada) Conrad Orzel	Host pick	
Women	September 28	(Switzerland) Alexia Paganini	September 30	(Japan) Mana Kawabe		
Women	October 18	(Japan) Rika Kihira	October 19	(Japan) Mai Mihara	Injury	

==== Gran Premio d'Italia ====
Discipline	Withdrew		Added		Notes	Ref.
Discipline	Date	Skater(s)	Date	Skater(s)	Notes	Ref.
Men	September 21	(China) Yan Han	October 1	(Italy) Gabriele Frangipani	Host picks	
Women	September 21	(China) Lin Shan	October 1	(Italy) Lara Naki Gutmann	Host picks	
Pairs	—N/a		October 1	(Italy) Sara Conti / Niccolò Macii	Host picks	
Ice dance	—N/a		October 1	(Italy) Carolina Portesi Peroni / Michael Chrastecky	Host picks	
Ice dance	October 11	(Italy) Carolina Portesi Peroni / Michael Chrastecky	October 11	(Italy) Carolina Moscheni / Francesco Fioretti	Injury (Portesi Peroni)	
Women	October 19	(China) Chen Hongyi	October 20	(Italy) Lucrezia Beccari	Host pick	
Women	October 26	(United States) Bradie Tennell	October 27	(Germany) Nicole Schott	Injury	

==== NHK Trophy ====
Discipline	Withdrew		Added		Notes	Ref.
Discipline	Date	Skater(s)	Date	Skater(s)	Notes	Ref.
Men	—N/a		September 15	(Japan) Kao Miura	Host picks	
Women	—N/a		September 15	(Japan) Rino Matsuike	Host picks	
Ice dance	—N/a		September 15	(Japan) Misato Komatsubara / Tim Koleto	Host picks	
Ice dance	October 6	(China) Wang Shiyue / Liu Xinyu	October 6	(Russia) Sofia Shevchenko / Igor Eremenko		
Men	October 27	(Russia) Daniil Samsonov	—N/a			
Women	October 27	(Austria) Olga Mikutina	—N/a		Injury recovery	
Pairs	October 27	(Austria) Miriam Ziegler / Severin Kiefer	—N/a		Lack of preparation after injury	
Men	November 4	(Japan) Yuzuru Hanyu	November 5	(Japan) Sōta Yamamoto	Injury	
Women	November 5	(Japan) Rika Kihira	November 8	(Japan) Mana Kawabe	Injury	
Women	November 7	(Russia) Alexandra Trusova	—N/a		Injury	
Ice dance	November 7	(United States) Kaitlin Hawayek / Jean-Luc Baker	—N/a		Concussion (Hawayek)	

==== Internationaux de France ====
Discipline	Withdrew		Added		Notes	Ref.
Discipline	Date	Skater(s)	Date	Skater(s)	Notes	Ref.
Men	—N/a		September 16	(France) Romain Ponsart	Host picks	
Pairs	—N/a		September 16	(France) Coline Keriven / Noël-Antoine Pierre	Host picks	
Ice dance	—N/a		September 16	(France) Evgeniia Lopareva / Geoffrey Brissaud	Host picks	
Pairs	October 18	(France) Cléo Hamon / Denys Strekalin	October 18	(France) Camille Kovalev / Pavel Kovalev	Hamon & Strekalin split.	
Pairs	October 19	(China) Peng Cheng / Jin Yang	October 21	(Hungary) Ioulia Chtchetinina / Márk Magyar		
Pairs	October 19	(China) Wang Yuchen / Huang Yihang	October 21	(Italy) Rebecca Ghilardi / Filippo Ambrosini		
Ice dance	November 2	(France) Adelina Galyavieva / Louis Thauron	November 3	(France) Loïcia Demougeot / Théo Le Mercier	Galyavieva & Thauron split.	
Ice dance	November 2	(Russia) Tiffany Zahorski / Jonathan Guerreiro	November 8	(Finland) Juulia Turkkila / Matthias Versluis	Hospitalization (Zahorski)	
Women	November 3	(France) Maé-Bérénice Méité	November 8	(Japan) Yuhana Yokoi	Injury recovery	
Women	November 8	(France) Maïa Mazzara	November 8	(South Korea) Park Yeon-jeong		

==== Rostelecom Cup ====
Discipline	Withdrew		Added		Notes	Ref.
Discipline	Date	Skater(s)	Date	Skater(s)	Notes	Ref.
Men	—N/a		September 16	(Russia) Mark Kondratiuk	Host picks	
Women	—N/a		September 16	(Russia) Maiia Khromykh	Host picks	
Pairs	—N/a		September 16	(Russia) Yasmina Kadyrova / Ivan Balchenko	Host picks	
Ice dance	—N/a		September 16	(Russia) Elizaveta Khudaiberdieva / Egor Bazin	Host picks	
Women	September 16	(Kazakhstan) Elizabet Tursynbaeva	September 29	(Belarus) Viktoriia Safonova	Retirement	
Ice dance	November 2	(France) Adelina Galyavieva / Louis Thauron	November 3	(Lithuania) Allison Reed / Saulius Ambrulevičius	Galyavieva & Thauron split.	
Men	November 15	(United States) Maxim Naumov	November 17	(Australia) Brendan Kerry	Injury	
Ice dance	November 16	(Georgia (country)) Maria Kazakova / Georgy Reviya	—N/a		Doctor's recommendations	
Men	November 17	(Japan) Yuzuru Hanyu	November 18	(Georgia (country)) Nika Egadze	Injury	
Pairs	November 17	(Germany) Annika Hocke / Robert Kunkel	November 18	(Hungary) Ioulia Chtchetinina / Márk Magyar	Injury recovery (Kunkel)	
Ice dance	November 22	(Poland) Natalia Kaliszek / Maksym Spodyriev	—N/a			

== Medal summary ==
Event	Discipline	Gold	Silver	Bronze
(United States) Skate America	Men	(United States) Vincent Zhou	(Japan) Shoma Uno	(United States) Nathan Chen
(United States) Skate America	Women	(Russia) Alexandra Trusova	(Russia) Daria Usacheva	(South Korea) You Young
(United States) Skate America	Pairs	(Russia) Evgenia Tarasova / Vladimir Morozov	(Japan) Riku Miura / Ryuichi Kihara	(Russia) Aleksandra Boikova / Dmitrii Kozlovskii
(United States) Skate America	Ice dance	(United States) Madison Hubbell / Zachary Donohue	(United States) Madison Chock / Evan Bates	(Canada) Laurence Fournier Beaudry / Nikolaj Sørensen

Event	Discipline	Gold	Silver	Bronze
Skate Canada International	Men	(United States) Nathan Chen	(United States) Jason Brown	(Russia) Evgeni Semenenko
Skate Canada International	Women	(Russia) Kamila Valieva	(Russia) Elizaveta Tuktamysheva	(Russia) Alena Kostornaia
Skate Canada International	Pairs	(China) Sui Wenjing / Han Cong	(Russia) Daria Pavliuchenko / Denis Khodykin	(United States) Ashley Cain-Gribble / Timothy LeDuc
Skate Canada International	Ice dance	(Canada) Piper Gilles / Paul Poirier	(Italy) Charlène Guignard / Marco Fabbri	(Spain) Olivia Smart / Adrián Díaz

Event	Discipline	Gold	Silver	Bronze
(Italy) Gran Premio d'Italia	Men	(Japan) Yuma Kagiyama	(Russia) Mikhail Kolyada	(Italy) Daniel Grassl
(Italy) Gran Premio d'Italia	Women	(Russia) Anna Shcherbakova	(Russia) Maiia Khromykh	(Belgium) Loena Hendrickx
(Italy) Gran Premio d'Italia	Pairs	(China) Sui Wenjing / Han Cong	(China) Peng Cheng / Jin Yang	(Russia) Iuliia Artemeva / Mikhail Nazarychev
(Italy) Gran Premio d'Italia	Ice dance	(France) Gabriella Papadakis / Guillaume Cizeron	(United States) Madison Hubbell / Zachary Donohue	(Russia) Alexandra Stepanova / Ivan Bukin

Event	Discipline	Gold	Silver	Bronze
(Japan) NHK Trophy	Men	(Japan) Shoma Uno	(United States) Vincent Zhou	(South Korea) Cha Jun-hwan
(Japan) NHK Trophy	Women	(Japan) Kaori Sakamoto	(Japan) Mana Kawabe	(South Korea) You Young
(Japan) NHK Trophy	Pairs	(Russia) Anastasia Mishina / Aleksandr Galliamov	(Russia) Evgenia Tarasova / Vladimir Morozov	(Japan) Riku Miura / Ryuichi Kihara
(Japan) NHK Trophy	Ice dance	(Russia) Victoria Sinitsina / Nikita Katsalapov	(United States) Madison Chock / Evan Bates	(United Kingdom) Lilah Fear / Lewis Gibson

Event	Discipline	Gold	Silver	Bronze
Internationaux de France	Men	(Japan) Yuma Kagiyama	(Japan) Shun Sato	(United States) Jason Brown
Internationaux de France	Women	(Russia) Anna Shcherbakova	(Russia) Alena Kostornaia	(Japan) Wakaba Higuchi
Internationaux de France	Pairs	(Russia) Aleksandra Boikova / Dmitrii Kozlovskii	(Russia) Iuliia Artemeva / Mikhail Nazarychev	(United States) Alexa Knierim / Brandon Frazier
Internationaux de France	Ice dance	(France) Gabriella Papadakis / Guillaume Cizeron	(Canada) Piper Gilles / Paul Poirier	(Russia) Alexandra Stepanova / Ivan Bukin

Event	Discipline	Gold	Silver	Bronze
(Russia) Rostelecom Cup	Men	(Georgia (country)) Morisi Kvitelashvili	(Russia) Mikhail Kolyada	(Japan) Kazuki Tomono
(Russia) Rostelecom Cup	Women	(Russia) Kamila Valieva	(Russia) Elizaveta Tuktamysheva	(Russia) Maiia Khromykh
(Russia) Rostelecom Cup	Pairs	(Russia) Anastasia Mishina / Aleksandr Galliamov	(Russia) Daria Pavliuchenko / Denis Khodykin	(Russia) Yasmina Kadyrova / Ivan Balchenko
(Russia) Rostelecom Cup	Ice dance	(Russia) Victoria Sinitsina / Nikita Katsalapov	(Italy) Charlène Guignard / Marco Fabbri	(Canada) Laurence Fournier Beaudry / Nikolaj Sørensen

=== Medal standings ===
Rank	Nation	Gold	Silver	Bronze	Total
1	Russia	11	11	8	30
2	Japan	4	4	3	11
3	United States	3	5	4	12
4	China	2	1	0	3
5	France	2	0	0	2
6	Canada	1	1	2	4
7	Georgia	1	0	0	1
8	Italy	0	2	1	3
9	South Korea	0	0	3	3
10	Belgium	0	0	1	1
10	Great Britain	0	0	1	1
10	Spain	0	0	1	1
Totals (12 entries)		24	24	24	72

== Qualification ==
At each event, skaters earned points toward qualification for the Grand Prix Final. Following the sixth event, the top six highest-scoring skaters/teams advanced to the Final. The points earned per placement were as follows:

Placement	Singles	Pairs/Ice dance
1st	15	15
2nd	13	13
3rd	11	11
4th	9	9
5th	7	7
6th	5	5
7th	4	—N/a
8th	3	—N/a

There were originally seven tie-breakers in cases of a tie in overall points:

1. Highest placement at an event. If a skater placed 1st and 3rd, the tiebreaker is the 1st place, and that beats a skater who placed 2nd in both events.
2. Highest combined total scores in both events. If a skater earned 200 points at one event and 250 at a second, that skater would win in the second tie-break over a skater who earned 200 points at one event and 150 at another.
3. Participated in two events.
4. Highest combined scores in the free skating/free dance portion of both events.
5. Highest individual score in the free skating/free dance portion from one event.
6. Highest combined scores in the short program/short dance of both events.
7. Highest number of total participants at the events.

If a tie remained, it was considered unbreakable and the tied skaters all advanced to the Grand Prix Final.

=== Qualification standings ===
Points	Men	Women	Pairs	Ice dance
30	(Japan) Yuma Kagiyama	(Russia) Kamila Valieva	(Russia) Anastasia Mishina / Aleksandr Galliamov	(France) Gabriella Papadakis / Guillaume Cizeron
30	(Japan) Yuma Kagiyama	(Russia) Anna Shcherbakova	(China) Sui Wenjing / Han Cong	(Russia) Victoria Sinitsina / Nikita Katsalapov
28	(Japan) Shoma Uno	—N/a	(Russia) Evgenia Tarasova / Vladimir Morozov	(United States) Madison Hubbell / Zachary Donohue
28	(United States) Vincent Zhou	—N/a	(Russia) Evgenia Tarasova / Vladimir Morozov	(Canada) Piper Gilles / Paul Poirier
26	(United States) Nathan Chen	(Russia) Elizaveta Tuktamysheva	(Russia) Aleksandra Boikova / Dmitrii Kozlovskii	(United States) Madison Chock / Evan Bates
26	(Russia) Mikhail Kolyada	(Russia) Elizaveta Tuktamysheva	(Russia) Daria Pavliuchenko / Denis Khodykin	(Italy) Charlène Guignard / Marco Fabbri
24	(United States) Jason Brown	(Japan) Kaori Sakamoto	(Japan) Riku Miura / Ryuichi Kihara	—N/a
24	(United States) Jason Brown	(Russia) Maiia Khromykh	(Russia) Iuliia Artemeva / Mikhail Nazarychev	—N/a
24	(United States) Jason Brown	(Russia) Alena Kostornaia	(Russia) Iuliia Artemeva / Mikhail Nazarychev	—N/a
22	(Japan) Shun Sato	(South Korea) You Young	—N/a	(Russia) Alexandra Stepanova / Ivan Bukin
22	(Japan) Shun Sato	(South Korea) You Young	—N/a	(Canada) Laurence Fournier Beaudry / Nikolaj Sørensen
20	(Georgia (country)) Morisi Kvitelashvili	—N/a	(United States) Alexa Knierim / Brandon Frazier	(Spain) Olivia Smart / Adrián Díaz
20	(Georgia (country)) Morisi Kvitelashvili	—N/a	(United States) Ashley Cain-Gribble / Timothy LeDuc	(Spain) Olivia Smart / Adrián Díaz
18	(South Korea) Cha Jun-hwan	(Belgium) Loena Hendrickx	(Canada) Vanessa James / Eric Radford	(Spain) Sara Hurtado / Kirill Khaliavin
18	(Latvia) Deniss Vasiļjevs	(Japan) Mai Mihara	(Canada) Vanessa James / Eric Radford	(Spain) Sara Hurtado / Kirill Khaliavin
18	(Russia) Makar Ignatov	(Japan) Mai Mihara	(Canada) Vanessa James / Eric Radford	(Spain) Sara Hurtado / Kirill Khaliavin
16	(Japan) Kazuki Tomono	(Japan) Wakaba Higuchi	(United States) Audrey Lu / Misha Mitrofanov	(United States) Caroline Green / Michael Parsons
16	(Russia) Evgeni Semenenko	(United States) Alysa Liu	(United States) Audrey Lu / Misha Mitrofanov	(United States) Caroline Green / Michael Parsons
16	(Russia) Evgeni Semenenko	(Russia) Kseniia Sinitsyna	(United States) Audrey Lu / Misha Mitrofanov	(United States) Caroline Green / Michael Parsons
15	(Italy) Daniel Grassl	(Russia) Alexandra Trusova	—N/a	
14	(Italy) Matteo Rizzo	(United States) Mariah Bell	(Italy) Rebecca Ghilardi / Filippo Ambrosini	(France) Evgeniia Lopareva / Geoffrey Brissaud
13	—N/a	(Japan) Mana Kawabe	(China) Peng Cheng / Jin Yang	—N/a
13	—N/a	(Russia) Daria Usacheva	(China) Peng Cheng / Jin Yang	—N/a
12	(Canada) Keegan Messing	—N/a	(Canada) Kirsten Moore-Towers / Michael Marinaro	(Canada) Marjorie Lajoie / Zachary Lagha
12	(Canada) Keegan Messing	—N/a	(Canada) Kirsten Moore-Towers / Michael Marinaro	(Russia) Annabelle Morozov / Andrei Bagin
11	—N/a	(Japan) Satoko Miyahara	(Russia) Yasmina Kadyrova / Ivan Balchenko	(United Kingdom) Lilah Fear / Lewis Gibson
10	—N/a	(South Korea) Lim Eun-soo	(Russia) Alina Pepeleva / Roman Pleshkov	—N/a
10	—N/a	(South Korea) Lim Eun-soo	(Hungary) Ioulia Chtchetinina / Márk Magyar	—N/a
9	(Canada) Roman Sadovsky	(United States) Amber Glenn	(Italy) Nicole Della Monica / Matteo Guarise	(China) Wang Shiyue / Liu Xinyu
8	(Russia) Alexander Samarin	(South Korea) Kim Ye-lim	—N/a	
8	(Japan) Sōta Yamamoto	(Canada) Madeline Schizas	—N/a	
8	(Japan) Sōta Yamamoto	(Japan) Rino Matsuike	—N/a	
7	(Russia) Dmitri Aliev	(United States) Karen Chen	(Germany) Minerva Fabienne Hase / Nolan Seegert	(United States) Christina Carreira / Anthony Ponomarenko
7	(United States) Jimmy Ma	(United States) Karen Chen	(United States) Jessica Calalang / Brian Johnson	(United States) Kaitlin Hawayek / Jean-Luc Baker
7	(United States) Jimmy Ma	(United States) Karen Chen	(United States) Jessica Calalang / Brian Johnson	(Russia) Diana Davis / Gleb Smolkin
5	(Czech Republic) Michal Březina	—N/a	(Canada) Evelyn Walsh / Trennt Michaud	(Japan) Misato Komatsubara / Tim Koleto
5	(Czech Republic) Michal Březina	—N/a	(Canada) Evelyn Walsh / Trennt Michaud	(Russia) Anastasia Skoptsova / Kirill Aleshin
5	(Czech Republic) Michal Březina	—N/a	(Canada) Evelyn Walsh / Trennt Michaud	(Japan) Kana Muramoto / Daisuke Takahashi
4	(United States) Camden Pulkinen	(Azerbaijan) Ekaterina Ryabova	—N/a	
4	(Russia) Andrei Mozalev	(South Korea) Lee Hae-in	—N/a	
4	(China) Jin Boyang	(Belarus) Viktoriia Safonova	—N/a	
4	(China) Jin Boyang	(Russia) Sofia Samodurova	—N/a	
3	(Russia) Petr Gumennik	(Germany) Nicole Schott	—N/a	
3	(Russia) Mark Kondratiuk	(South Korea) Park Yeon-jeong	—N/a	
3	(Japan) Kao Miura	(South Korea) Park Yeon-jeong	—N/a	
3	(Canada) Nam Nguyen	(South Korea) Park Yeon-jeong	—N/a	
3	(France) Adam Siao Him Fa	(South Korea) Park Yeon-jeong	—N/a	

=== Qualifiers ===
No.	Men	Women	Pairs	Ice dance
1	(Japan) Yuma Kagiyama	(Russia) Kamila Valieva	(Russia) Anastasia Mishina / Aleksandr Galliamov	(France) Gabriella Papadakis / Guillaume Cizeron
2	(Japan) Shoma Uno	(Russia) Anna Shcherbakova	(China) Sui Wenjing / Han Cong	(Russia) Victoria Sinitsina / Nikita Katsalapov
3	(United States) Vincent Zhou	(Russia) Elizaveta Tuktamysheva	(Russia) Evgenia Tarasova / Vladimir Morozov	(United States) Madison Hubbell / Zachary Donohue
4	(United States) Nathan Chen	(Japan) Kaori Sakamoto	(Russia) Aleksandra Boikova / Dmitrii Kozlovskii	(Canada) Piper Gilles / Paul Poirier
5	(Russia) Mikhail Kolyada	(Russia) Maiia Khromykh	(Russia) Daria Pavliuchenko / Denis Khodykin	(United States) Madison Chock / Evan Bates
6	(United States) Jason Brown	(Russia) Alena Kostornaia	(Japan) Riku Miura / Ryuichi Kihara	(Italy) Charlène Guignard / Marco Fabbri

Alternates

No.	Men	Women	Pairs	Ice dance
1	(Japan) Shun Sato	(South Korea) You Young	(Russia) Iuliia Artemeva / Mikhail Nazarychev	(Russia) Alexandra Stepanova / Ivan Bukin
2	(Georgia (country)) Morisi Kvitelashvili	(Belgium) Loena Hendrickx	(United States) Alexa Knierim / Brandon Frazier	(Canada) Laurence Fournier Beaudry / Nikolaj Sørensen
3	(South Korea) Cha Jun-hwan	(Japan) Mai Mihara	(United States) Ashley Cain-Gribble / Timothy LeDuc	(Spain) Olivia Smart / Adrián Díaz

== Records and achievements ==
=== Records ===
The following new ISU best scores were set during this season:

Disc.	Segment	Skater(s)	Score	Event	Date	Ref.
Women's singles	Short program	(Russia) Kamila Valieva	87.42	2021 Rostelecom Cup	November 26, 2021	
Women's singles	Free skating	(Russia) Kamila Valieva	185.29	2021 Rostelecom Cup	November 27, 2021	
Women's singles	Total score	(Russia) Kamila Valieva	272.71	2021 Rostelecom Cup	November 27, 2021	

=== Achievements ===
- At the 2021 Gran Premio d'Italia, Loena Hendrickx won Belgium's first Grand Prix medal (a bronze medal) in women's singles.
- At the 2021 Rostelecom Cup, Morisi Kvitelashvili won Georgia's first Grand Prix gold medal at the senior level in any discipline.

== Top scores ==
=== Men's singles ===
Top 10 best scores in the men's combined total
No.	Skater	Nation	Score	Event
1	Nathan Chen	United States	307.18	2021 Skate Canada International
2	Vincent Zhou	United States	295.56	2021 Skate America
3	Shoma Uno	Japan	290.15	2021 NHK Trophy
4	Yuma Kagiyama	Japan	286.41	2021 Internationaux de France
5	Mikhail Kolyada	Russia	273.55	2021 Gran Premio d'Italia
6	Daniel Grassl	Italy	269.00	2021 Gran Premio d'Italia
7	Morisi Kvitelashvili	Georgia	266.33	2021 Rostelecom Cup
8	Shun Sato	Japan	264.99	2021 Internationaux de France
9	Jason Brown	United States	264.20	2021 Internationaux de France
10	Kazuki Tomono	Japan	264.19	2021 Rostelecom Cup

Top 10 best scores in the men's short program
No.	Skater	Nation	Score	Event
1	Nathan Chen	United States	106.72	2021 Skate Canada International
2	Shoma Uno	Japan	102.58	2021 NHK Trophy
3	Yuma Kagiyama	Japan	100.64	2021 Internationaux de France
4	Vincent Zhou	United States	99.51	2021 NHK Trophy
5	Jin Boyang	China	97.89	2021 Gran Premio d'Italia
6	Cha Jun-hwan	South Korea	95.92	2021 NHK Trophy
7	Kazuki Tomono	Japan	95.81	2021 Rostelecom Cup
8	Daniel Grassl	Italy	95.67	2021 Gran Premio d'Italia
9	Morisi Kvitelashvili	Georgia	95.37	2021 Rostelecom Cup
10	Jason Brown	United States	94.00	2021 Skate Canada International

Top 10 best scores in the men's free skating
No.	Skater	Nation	Score	Event
1	Nathan Chen	United States	200.46	2021 Skate Canada International
2	Vincent Zhou	United States	198.13	2021 Skate America
3	Yuma Kagiyama	Japan	197.49	2021 Gran Premio d'Italia
4	Shoma Uno	Japan	187.57	2021 NHK Trophy
5	Mikhail Kolyada	Russia	181.25	2021 Gran Premio d'Italia
6	Andrei Mozalev	Russia	179.77	2021 Internationaux de France
7	Shun Sato	Japan	177.17	2021 Internationaux de France
8	Jason Brown	United States	174.81	2021 Internationaux de France
9	Daniel Grassl	Italy	173.33	2021 Gran Premio d'Italia
10	Matteo Rizzo	Italy	173.02	2021 Rostelecom Cup

=== Women's singles ===
Top 10 best scores in the women's combined total
No.	Skater	Nation	Score	Event
1	Kamila Valieva	Russia	272.71	2021 Rostelecom Cup
2	Anna Shcherbakova	Russia	236.78	2021 Gran Premio d'Italia
3	Elizaveta Tuktamysheva	Russia	232.88	2021 Skate Canada International
4	Alexandra Trusova	Russia	232.37	2021 Skate America
5	Maiia Khromykh	Russia	226.35	2021 Gran Premio d'Italia
6	Kaori Sakamoto	Japan	223.34	2021 NHK Trophy
7	Alena Kostornaia	Russia	221.85	2021 Internationaux de France
8	Loena Hendrickx	Belgium	219.05	2021 Gran Premio d'Italia
9	Daria Usacheva	Russia	217.31	2021 Skate America
10	You Young	South Korea	216.97	2021 Skate America

Top 10 best scores in the women's short program
No.	Skater	Nation	Score	Event
1	Kamila Valieva	Russia	87.42	2021 Rostelecom Cup
2	Elizaveta Tuktamysheva	Russia	81.24	2021 Skate Canada International
3	Anna Shcherbakova	Russia	77.94	2021 Internationaux de France
4	Alexandra Trusova	Russia	77.69	2021 Skate America
5	Daria Usacheva	Russia	76.71	2021 Skate America
6	Kaori Sakamoto	Japan	76.56	2021 NHK Trophy
7	Alena Kostornaia	Russia	76.44	2021 Internationaux de France
8	Mana Kawabe	Japan	73.88	2021 NHK Trophy
9	Alysa Liu	United States	73.63	2021 Skate Canada International
10	Loena Hendrickx	Belgium	73.52	2021 Gran Premio d'Italia

Top 10 best scores in the women's free skating
No.	Skater	Nation	Score	Event
1	Kamila Valieva	Russia	185.29	2021 Rostelecom Cup
2	Anna Shcherbakova	Russia	165.05	2021 Gran Premio d'Italia
3	Maiia Khromykh	Russia	154.97	2021 Rostelecom Cup
4	Alexandra Trusova	Russia	154.68	2021 Skate America
5	Elizaveta Tuktamysheva	Russia	151.64	2021 Skate Canada International
6	Kaori Sakamoto	Japan	146.78	2021 NHK Trophy
7	You Young	South Korea	146.24	2021 Skate America
8	Loena Hendrickx	Belgium	145.53	2021 Gran Premio d'Italia
9	Alena Kostornaia	Russia	145.41	2021 Internationaux de France
10	Mai Mihara	Japan	144.49	2021 Gran Premio d'Italia

=== Pairs ===
Top 10 best scores in the pairs' combined total
No.	Team	Nation	Score	Event
1	Anastasia Mishina / Aleksandr Galliamov	Russia	227.28	2021 NHK Trophy
2	Sui Wenjing / Han Cong	China	224.55	2021 Gran Premio d'Italia
3	Evgenia Tarasova / Vladimir Morozov	Russia	222.50	2021 Skate America
4	Aleksandra Boikova / Dmitrii Kozlovskii	Russia	216.96	2021 Internationaux de France
5	Daria Pavliuchenko / Denis Khodykin	Russia	212.59	2021 Rostelecom Cup
6	Peng Cheng / Jin Yang	China	211.86	2021 Gran Premio d'Italia
7	Riku Miura / Ryuichi Kihara	Japan	209.42	2021 NHK Trophy
8	Iuliia Artemeva / Mikhail Nazarychev	Russia	205.15	2021 Internationaux de France
9	Alexa Knierim / Brandon Frazier	United States	202.97	2021 Skate America
10	Ashley Cain-Gribble / Timothy LeDuc	United States	202.79	2021 NHK Trophy

Top 10 best scores in the pairs' short program
No.	Team	Nation	Score	Event
1	Evgenia Tarasova / Vladimir Morozov	Russia	80.36	2021 Skate America
2	Sui Wenjing / Han Cong	China	80.07	2021 Gran Premio d'Italia
3	Anastasia Mishina / Aleksandr Galliamov	Russia	78.40	2021 NHK Trophy
4	Aleksandra Boikova / Dmitrii Kozlovskii	Russia	77.17	2021 Internationaux de France
5	Peng Cheng / Jin Yang	China	76.71	2021 Gran Premio d'Italia
6	Riku Miura / Ryuichi Kihara	Japan	73.98	2021 NHK Trophy
7	Daria Pavliuchenko / Denis Khodykin	Russia	73.91	2021 Rostelecom Cup
8	Iuliia Artemeva / Mikhail Nazarychev	Russia	73.02	2021 Internationaux de France
9	Vanessa James / Eric Radford	Canada	71.84	2021 Internationaux de France
10	Ashley Cain-Gribble / Timothy LeDuc	United States	70.75	2021 NHK Trophy

Top 10 best scores in the pairs' free skating
No.	Team	Nation	Score	Event
1	Anastasia Mishina / Aleksandr Galliamov	Russia	153.34	2021 Rostelecom Cup
2	Sui Wenjing / Han Cong	China	145.11	2021 Skate Canada International
3	Evgenia Tarasova / Vladimir Morozov	Russia	142.14	2021 Skate America
4	Aleksandra Boikova / Dmitrii Kozlovskii	Russia	139.79	2021 Internationaux de France
5	Daria Pavliuchenko / Denis Khodykin	Russia	138.68	2021 Rostelecom Cup
6	Alexa Knierim / Brandon Frazier	United States	136.60	2021 Skate America
7	Riku Miura / Ryuichi Kihara	Japan	135.57	2021 Skate America
8	Peng Cheng / Jin Yang	China	135.15	2021 Gran Premio d'Italia
9	Iuliia Artemeva / Mikhail Nazarychev	Russia	132.13	2021 Internationaux de France
10	Ashley Cain-Gribble / Timothy LeDuc	United States	132.04	2021 NHK Trophy

=== Ice dance ===
Top 10 season's best scores in the combined total (ice dance)
No.	Team	Nation	Score	Event
1	Gabriella Papadakis / Guillaume Cizeron	France	221.25	2021 Internationaux de France
2	Victoria Sinitsina / Nikita Katsalapov	Russia	215.44	2021 NHK Trophy
3	Piper Gilles / Paul Poirier	Canada	210.97	2021 Skate Canada International
4	Madison Chock / Evan Bates	United States	210.78	2021 NHK Trophy
5	Madison Hubbell / Zachary Donohue	United States	209.54	2021 Skate America
6	Charlène Guignard / Marco Fabbri	Italy	203.71	2021 Rostelecom Cup
7	Alexandra Stepanova / Ivan Bukin	Russia	202.18	2021 Gran Premio d'Italia
8	Olivia Smart / Adrián Díaz	Spain	192.93	2021 Skate Canada International
9	Lilah Fear / Lewis Gibson	Great Britain	191.91	2021 NHK Trophy
10	Laurence Fournier Beaudry / Nikolaj Sørensen	Canada	191.40	2021 Rostelecom Cup

Top 10 season's best scores in the rhythm dance
No.	Team	Nation	Score	Event
1	Gabriella Papadakis / Guillaume Cizeron	France	89.08	2021 Internationaux de France
2	Victoria Sinitsina / Nikita Katsalapov	Russia	86.81	2021 Rostelecom Cup
3	Madison Chock / Evan Bates	United States	86.02	2021 NHK Trophy
4	Piper Gilles / Paul Poirier	Canada	85.65	2021 Skate Canada International
5	Madison Hubbell / Zachary Donohue	United States	84.79	2021 Gran Premio d'Italia
6	Alexandra Stepanova / Ivan Bukin	Russia	81.47	2021 Gran Premio d'Italia
7	Charlène Guignard / Marco Fabbri	Italy	79.56	2021 Rostelecom Cup
8	Olivia Smart / Adrián Díaz	Spain	76.97	2021 Skate Canada International
9	Lilah Fear / Lewis Gibson	Great Britain	76.43	2021 NHK Trophy
10	Laurence Fournier Beaudry / Nikolaj Sørensen	Canada	76.39	2021 Rostelecom Cup

Top 10 season's best scores in the free dance
No.	Team	Nation	Score	Event
1	Gabriella Papadakis / Guillaume Cizeron	France	132.61	2021 Gran Premio d'Italia
2	Victoria Sinitsina / Nikita Katsalapov	Russia	129.11	2021 NHK Trophy
3	Madison Hubbell / Zachary Donohue	United States	125.96	2021 Skate America
4	Madison Chock / Evan Bates	United States	125.68	2021 Skate America
5	Piper Gilles / Paul Poirier	Canada	125.32	2021 Skate Canada International
6	Charlène Guignard / Marco Fabbri	Italy	124.15	2021 Rostelecom Cup
7	Alexandra Stepanova / Ivan Bukin	Russia	120.71	2021 Gran Premio d'Italia
8	Olivia Smart / Adrián Díaz	Spain	115.96	2021 Skate Canada International
9	Lilah Fear / Lewis Gibson	Great Britain	115.48	2021 NHK Trophy
10	Laurence Fournier Beaudry / Nikolaj Sørensen	Canada	115.01	2021 Rostelecom Cup
