= 2021 NHK Trophy =

- Type: Grand Prix
- Date: November 12 – 14
- Season: 2021–22
- Location: Tokyo, Japan
- Host: Japan Skating Federation
- Venue: Yoyogi National Gymnasium

Champions
- Men's singles: (Japan) Shoma Uno
- Women's singles: (Japan) Kaori Sakamoto
- Pairs: (Russia) Anastasia Mishina and Aleksandr Galliamov
- Ice dance: (Russia) Victoria Sinitsina and Nikita Katsalapov
- Previous: 2020 NHK Trophy
- Next: 2022 NHK Trophy
- Previous Grand Prix: 2021 Gran Premio d'Italia
- Next Grand Prix: 2021 Internationaux de France

The 2021 NHK Trophy was a figure skating competition sanctioned by the International Skating Union (ISU), organized and hosted by the Japan Skating Federation (Japanese: 日本スケート連盟), and the fourth event of the 2021–22 ISU Grand Prix of Figure Skating series. It was held at the Yoyogi National Gymnasium in Tokyo, Japan, from November 12 to 14, 2021. Medals were awarded in men's singles, women's singles, pair skating, and ice dance. Skaters earned points based on their results, and the top skaters or teams in each discipline at the end of the season were then invited to compete at the 2021–22 Grand Prix Final in Osaka, Japan. Shoma Uno and Kaori Sakamoto, both of Japan, won the men's and women's events, respectively. Anastasia Mishina and Aleksandr Galliamov of Russia won the pairs event, while Victoria Sinitsina and Nikita Katsalapov of Russia won the ice dance event.

== Background ==
The ISU Grand Prix of Figure Skating is a series of seven events sanctioned by the International Skating Union (ISU) and held during the autumn: six qualifying events and the Grand Prix Final. This allows skaters to perfect their programs earlier in the season, as well as compete against the skaters with whom they will later compete at the World Championships. This series also provides the viewing public with additional televised skating, which was in high demand. Skaters earn points based on their results in their respective competitions and the top skaters or teams in each discipline are invited to compete at the Grand Prix Final.

== Changes to preliminary assignments ==
The International Skating Union announced the preliminary list of entrants on June 29, 2021.

Discipline	Withdrew		Added		Notes	Ref.
Discipline	Date	Skater(s)	Date	Skater(s)	Notes	Ref.
Men	—N/a		September 15	(Japan); Kao Miura	Host picks	
Women	—N/a		September 15	(Japan); Rino Matsuike	Host picks	
Ice dance	—N/a		September 15	(Japan); Misato Komatsubara; Tim Koleto	Host picks	
Ice dance	October 6	(China); Wang Shiyue; Liu Xinyu	October 6	(Russia); Sofia Shevchenko; Igor Eremenko	—N/a	
Men	October 27	(Russia); Daniil Samsonov	—N/a		—N/a	
Women	October 27	(Austria); Olga Mikutina	—N/a		Recovery from injury	
Pairs	October 27	(Austria); Miriam Ziegler; Severin Kiefer	—N/a		Lack of preparation after injury	
Men	November 4	(Japan); Yuzuru Hanyu	November 5	(Japan); Sōta Yamamoto	Injury	
Women	November 5	(Japan); Rika Kihira	November 8	(Japan); Mana Kawabe	Injury	
Women	November 7	(Russia); Alexandra Trusova	—N/a		Injury	
Ice dance	November 7	(United States); Kaitlin Hawayek; Jean-Luc Baker	—N/a		Concussion (Hawayek)	

== Required performance elements ==
=== Single skating ===
Men and women competing in single skating performed their short programs on Friday, November 12. Lasting no more than 2 minutes 40 seconds, the short program had to include the following elements:

For men: one double or triple Axel; one triple or quadruple jump; one jump combination consisting of a double jump and a triple jump, two triple jumps, or a quadruple jump and a double jump or triple jump; one flying spin; one camel spin or sit spin with a change of foot; one spin combination with a change of foot; and a step sequence using the full ice surface.

For women: one double or triple Axel; one triple jump; one jump combination consisting of a double jump and a triple jump, or two triple jumps; one flying spin; one layback spin, sideways leaning spin, camel spin, or sit spin without a change of foot; one spin combination with a change of foot; and one step sequence using the full ice surface.

Men and women then performed their free skates on Saturday, November 13. The free skate for both men and women could last no more than 4 minutes, and had to include the following: seven jump elements, of which one had to be an Axel-type jump; three spins, of which one had to be a spin combination, one had to be a flying spin, and one had to be a spin with only one position; a step sequence; and a choreographic sequence.

=== Pair skating ===
Couples competing in pair skating performed their short programs on Friday, November 12. Lasting no more than 2 minutes 40 seconds, it had to include the following elements: one pair lift, one twist lift, one double or triple throw jump, one double or triple solo jump, one solo spin combination with a change of foot, one death spiral, and a step sequence using the full ice surface.

Couples performed their free skates on Saturday, November 13. The free skate could last no more than 4 minutes, and had to include the following: three pair lifts, of which one had to be a twist lift; two different throw jumps; one solo jump; one jump combination or sequence; one pair spin combination; one death spiral; and a choreographic sequence.

=== Ice dance ===
Couples competing in ice dance performed their rhythm dances on Friday, November 12. Lasting no more than 2 minutes 50 seconds, the theme of the rhythm dance this season was "street dance rhythms". Examples of applicable dance styles included, but were not limited, to: hip-hop, disco, swing, krump, popping, funk, jazz, reggae (reggaeton), and blues. The required pattern dance element was the Midnight Blues. The rhythm dance had to include the following elements: the pattern dance, the pattern dance step sequence, one dance lift, one set of sequential twizzles, and one step sequence.

Couples performed their free dances on Saturday, November 13. The free dance performance could last no longer than 4 minutes, and had to include the following: three dance lifts, one dance spin, one set of synchronized twizzles, one step sequence in hold, one step sequence while on one skate and not touching, and three choreographic elements, of which one had to be a choreographic character step sequence.

== Judging ==
For the 2021–2022 season, all of the technical elements in any figure skating performance – such as jumps, spins, and lifts – were assigned a predetermined base point value and were then scored by a panel of nine judges on a scale from -5 to 5 based on their quality of execution. The judging panel's Grade of Execution (GOE) was determined by calculating the trimmed mean (that is, an average after deleting the highest and lowest scores), and this GOE was added to the base value to come up with the final score for each element. The panel's scores for all elements were added together to generate a total element score. At the same time, judges evaluated each performance based on five program components – skating skills, transitions, performance, composition, and interpretation of the music – and assigned a score from .25 to 10 in .25 point increments. The judging panel's final score for each program component was also determined by calculating the trimmed mean. Those scores were then multiplied by the factor shown on the following chart; the results were added together to generate a total program component score.

Program component factoring
Discipline	Short program or Rhythm dance	Free skate or Free dance
Men	1.00	2.00
Women	0.80	1.60
Pairs	0.80	1.60
Ice dance	0.80	1.20

Deductions were applied for certain violations like time infractions, stops and restarts, or falls. The total element score and total program component score were added together, minus any deductions, to generate a final performance score for each skater or team.

== Medal summary ==
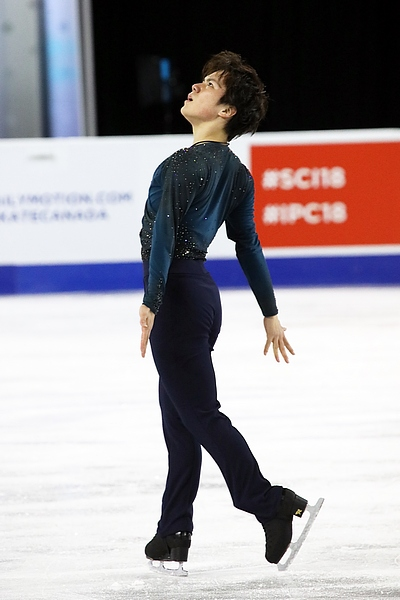
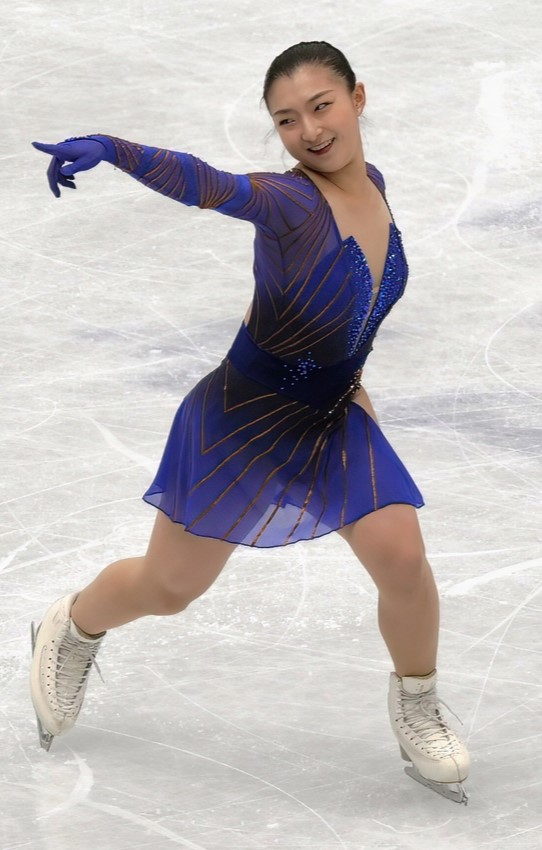
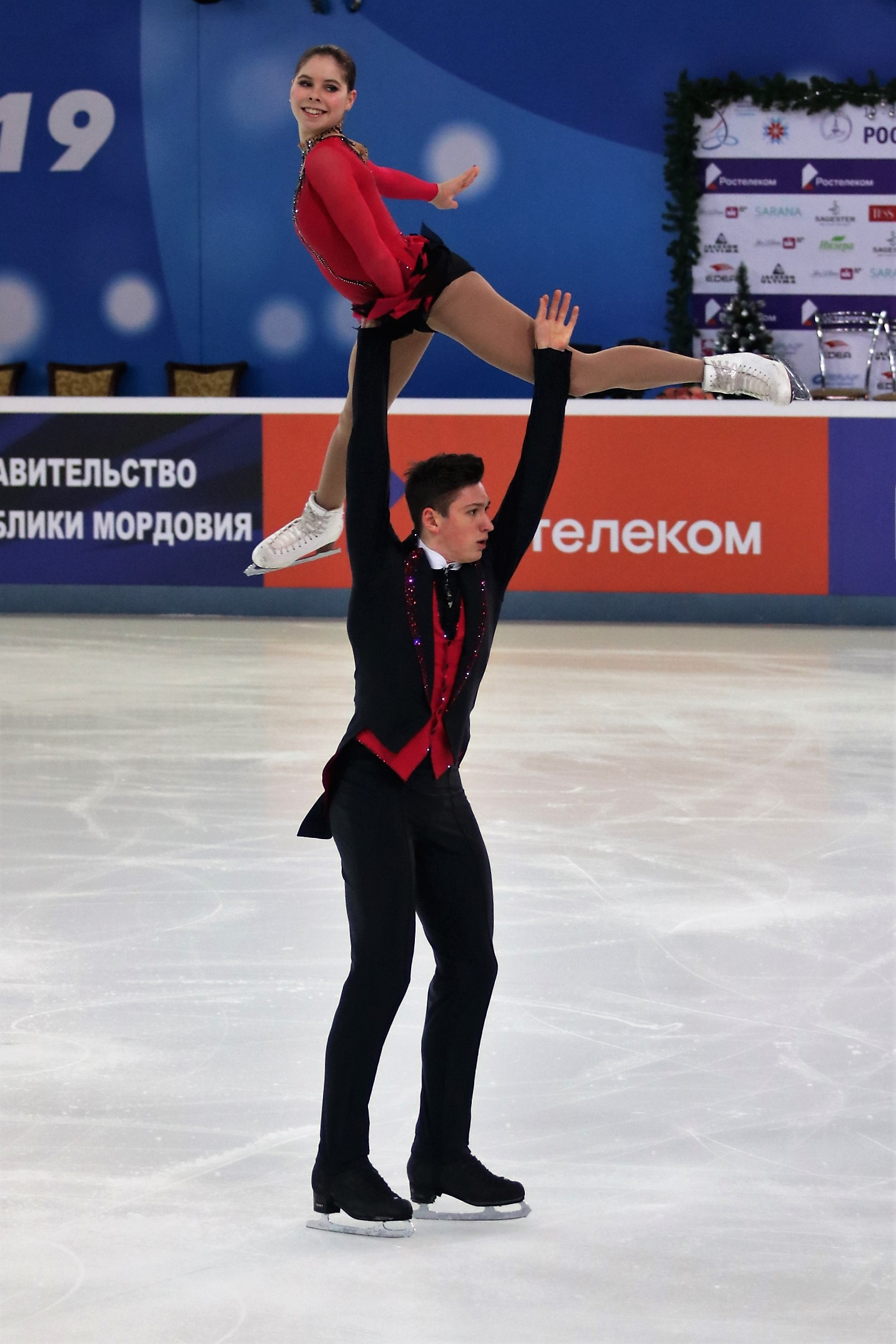
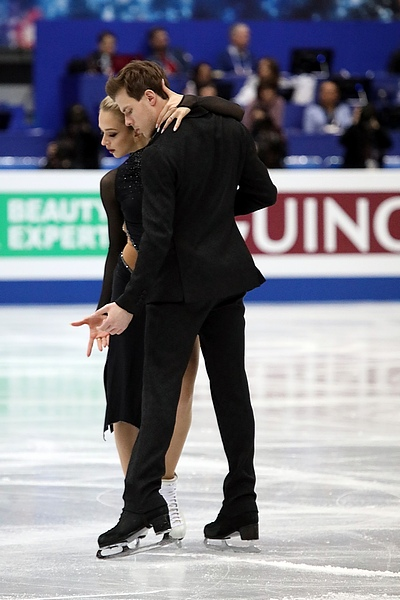
From left to right: The 2021 NHK Trophy champions: Shoma Uno of Japan (men's singles); Kaori Sakamoto of Japan (women's singles); Anastasia Mishina and Aleksandr Galliamov of Russia (pair skating); and Victoria Sinitsina and Nikita Katsalapov of Russia (ice dance)

Medalists
Discipline	Gold	Silver	Bronze
Men	(Japan) Shoma Uno	(United States) Vincent Zhou	(South Korea) Cha Jun-hwan
Women	(Japan) Kaori Sakamoto	(Japan) Mana Kawabe	(South Korea) You Young
Pairs	(Russia); Anastasia Mishina; Aleksandr Galliamov	(Russia); Evgenia Tarasova; Vladimir Morozov	(Japan); Riku Miura; Ryuichi Kihara
Ice dance	(Russia); Victoria Sinitsina; Nikita Katsalapov	(United States); Madison Chock; Evan Bates	(United Kingdom); Lilah Fear; Lewis Gibson

== Results ==
=== Men's singles ===
Men's results
Rank	Skater	Nation	Total points	SP		FS	
1st place, gold medalist(s)	Shoma Uno	Japan	290.15	1	102.58	1	187.57
2nd place, silver medalist(s)	Vincent Zhou	United States	260.69	2	99.51	6	161.18
3rd place, bronze medalist(s)	Cha Jun-hwan	South Korea	259.60	3	95.92	5	163.68
4	Makar Ignatov	Russia	257.20	4	90.54	4	166.66
5	Matteo Rizzo	Italy	255.84	6	84.78	3	171.06
6	Alexander Samarin	Russia	255.65	7	84.32	2	171.33
7	Sōta Yamamoto	Japan	238.90	5	86.05	8	152.85
8	Kao Miura	Japan	232.89	8	76.62	7	156.27
9	Tomoki Hiwatashi	United States	217.08	9	72.36	9	144.72
10	Nam Nguyen	Canada	208.39	10	64.28	10	144.11
11	Camden Pulkinen	United States	193.18	11	55.53	11	137.65

=== Women's singles ===
Women's results
Rank	Skater	Nation	Total points	SP		FS	
1st place, gold medalist(s)	Kaori Sakamoto	Japan	223.34	1	76.56	1	146.78
2nd place, silver medalist(s)	Mana Kawabe	Japan	205.44	2	73.88	4	131.56
3rd place, bronze medalist(s)	You Young	South Korea	203.60	3	68.08	2	135.52
4	Alysa Liu	United States	202.90	4	67.72	3	135.18
5	Lim Eun-soo	South Korea	186.68	5	65.23	6	121.45
6	Rino Matsuike	Japan	186.17	7	63.34	5	122.83
7	Amber Glenn	United States	175.83	6	63.43	8	112.40
8	Nicole Schott	Germany	172.37	8	59.26	7	113.11
9	Wi Seo-yeong	South Korea	170.54	9	58.23	9	112.31

=== Pairs ===
Pairs results
Rank	Team	Nation	Total points	SP		FS	
1st place, gold medalist(s)	Anastasia Mishina; Aleksandr Galliamov	Russia	227.28	1	78.40	1	148.88
2nd place, silver medalist(s)	Evgenia Tarasova; Vladimir Morozov	Russia	213.27	2	75.78	2	137.49
3rd place, bronze medalist(s)	Riku Miura; Ryuichi Kihara	Japan	209.42	3	73.98	3	135.44
4	Ashley Cain-Gribble; Timothy LeDuc	United States	202.79	4	70.75	4	132.04
5	Audrey Lu; Misha Mitrofanov	United States	190.03	5	64.95	5	125.08
6	Evelyn Walsh; Trennt Michaud	Canada	167.98	6	56.97	6	111.01
7	Minerva Fabienne Hase; Nolan Seegert	Germany	161.89	7	54.63	7	107.26

=== Ice dance ===
Ice dance results
Rank	Team	Nation	Total points	RD		FD	
1st place, gold medalist(s)	Victoria Sinitsina; Nikita Katsalapov	Russia	215.44	1	86.33	1	129.11
2nd place, silver medalist(s)	Madison Chock; Evan Bates	United States	210.78	2	86.02	2	124.76
3rd place, bronze medalist(s)	Lilah Fear; Lewis Gibson	Great Britain	191.91	3	76.43	3	115.48
4	Sara Hurtado; Kirill Khaliavin	Spain	188.09	4	76.40	5	111.69
5	Marjorie Lajoie; Zachary Lagha	Canada	187.38	5	74.45	4	112.93
6	Kana Muramoto; Daisuke Takahashi	Japan	179.50	6	70.74	6	108.76
7	Misato Komatsubara; Tim Koleto	Japan	172.20	7	68.13	7	104.07
8	Oleksandra Nazarova; Maksym Nikitin	Ukraine	165.38	8	66.07	8	99.31
9	Sofia Shevchenko; Igor Eremenko	Russia	160.13	9	65.17	9	94.96

== Works cited ==
- "Special Regulations & Technical Rules – Single & Pair Skating and Ice Dance 2021". International Skating Union. Archived from the original on April 4, 2022.
