= Conrad Orzel =

Canadian figure skater, and model (born 2000)

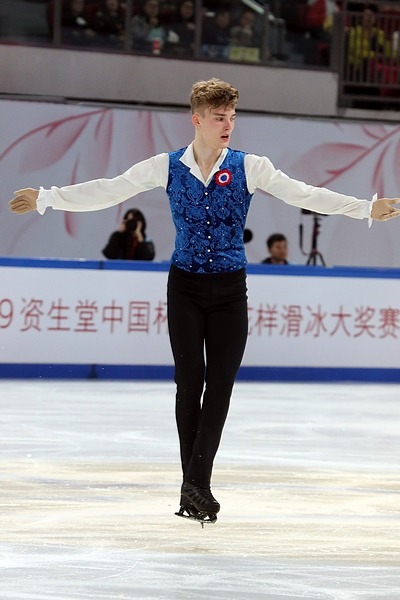
- Conrad Orzel at the 2019 Cup of China

Personal information
- Born: July 11, 2000 (age 26) Toronto, Ontario, Canada
- Home town: Woodbridge, Ontario
- Height: 1.83 m (6 ft 0 in)

Figure skating career
- Country: Canada
- Discipline: Men's singles
- Began skating: 2006
- Retired: May 1, 2024

Medal record
Canadian Championships
Silver medal – second place	2023 Oshawa	Singles

Conrad Orzel (born July 11, 2000) is a retired Canadian figure skater and model. He is the 2019 Bavarian Open silver medalist and 2023 Canadian national silver medalist. Earlier in his career, he won two medals on the ISU Junior Grand Prix series and placed 13th at the 2017 and 2018 World Junior Championships.

== Personal life ==
Orzel was born on July 11, 2000, in Toronto, Ontario, Canada. He is of Polish ancestry and speaks English, French, and Polish.

Orzel graduated from York University in May 2024. He also announced his retirement from competitive skating in order to pursue a career in public venture capital.

== Career ==
Orzel began learning to skate in 2003. Eva Najarro became his coach when he was five years old. He trained at the York Region Skating Academy in Richmond Hill, Ontario until 2018 and also worked with Joanne McLeod in Vancouver, British Columbia.

=== 2014–2015 season ===
Orzel sustained a torn ligament in his left leg before the Skate Canada Challenge in December 2014. The following month, he won bronze in the novice men's event at the 2015 Canadian Championships.

=== 2015–2016 season ===
Competing on the junior level, Orzel ranked fourth in the short program, sixth in the free skate, and fifth overall at the 2016 Canadian Championships. He hit his head on the ice during the free skate after attempting a triple Axel. He continued with his program and was examined afterwards by a medical team, which found no concussion. Making his international debut, he won the junior bronze medal at the Coupe du Printemps in March 2016.

=== 2016–2017 season ===
In August 2016, Orzel placed tenth at his first Junior Grand Prix (JGP) assignment in Saint Gervais-les-Bains, France, before winning silver at a JGP event in Dresden, Germany, in October. He received the junior silver medal at the 2017 Canadian Championships and was named in Canada's team to the 2017 World Junior Championships in Taipei, Taiwan. He placed eighteenth in the short program, twelfth in the free skate, and thirteenth overall.

=== 2017–2018 season ===
Orzel placed seventh at his first Junior Grand Prix assignment in Linz, Austria. In his second event in Poland, he won the bronze medal. Orzel moved to the senior level domestically, placing eleventh at the 2018 national championships. He ended the season at the 2018 World Junior Championships, where he placed thirteenth again.

=== 2018–2019 season ===
Orzel decided to leave his longtime coach Eva Najarro, transferring to the Toronto Cricket, Skating & Curling Club under the tutelage of Lee Barkell. He was again named to Skate Canada's NextGen team. Orzel placed fourth at both of his JGP assignments, coming only 0.01 points away from a bronze medal at 2018 JGP Slovenia after setting new personal bests in both the free skate and in total score.

At the 2019 Canadian Championships, Orzel placed fourth in the short program. He had a difficult free skate, dropping to fifth place overall. Because Orzel finished behind both Stephen Gogolev and Joseph Phan, he was not named to Canada's team for the World Junior Championships. He was instead assigned to the 2019 Bavarian Open, making his senior international debut, where he won the silver medal.

=== 2019–2020 season ===
Orzel moved to compete fully at the senior level, beginning the season at the 2019 CS Autumn Classic International, where he placed sixth. Making his Grand Prix debut at the 2019 Cup of China, he placed eleventh. Orzel was twelfth at the 2019 NHK Trophy and concluded his season with a sixth-place finish at the 2020 Canadian Championships.

=== 2020–2021 season ===
Orzel was assigned to compete at the 2020 Skate Canada International, but the event was cancelled as a result of the coronavirus pandemic.

With the pandemic continuing to make it difficult to hold in-person events, the 2021 Skate Canada Challenge was held virtually, and Orzel placed fifth at the event, notably placing third in the short program and landing two quadruple jumps. The 2021 Canadian Championships were subsequently cancelled.

=== 2021–2022 season ===
Orzel was assigned to begin the season at the 2021 CS Autumn Classic International, whose men's competition lost its Challenger status due to insufficient competitors and countries. Orzel won the gold medal over the two other Canadian men who competed. On the Grand Prix at 2021 Skate Canada International, Orzel placed ninth. After the free skate, he said, "even though there were some mistakes, I was still happy with the performance in general."

At the 2022 Canadian Championships, Orzel had a difficult short program, making mistakes on all his jumping passes to place fourteenth overall in the segment. He was sixth in the free skate, rising to ninth overall.

=== 2022–2023 season ===
After underwhelming results in preceding years, Orzel opted to leave his coaches at the Toronto Cricket, Skating and Curling Club to work with Ravi Walia at the Ice Palace FSC in Edmonton, Alberta.

Orzel was assigned to the 2022 CS Finlandia Trophy, finishing eleventh. He was eleventh as well at the 2022 Skate Canada International, and tenth at the 2022 NHK Trophy.

At the 2023 Canadian Championships, Orzel placed second in the short program. He placed fourth in the free skate, but won the silver medal. While national champion Keegan Messing was immediately named to compete at both the 2023 World Championships, the second Canadian men's berth was to be decided later, pending results at the 2023 Four Continents Championships, where both Orzel and fourth-place Stephen Gogolev were assigned. Orzel finished eighth at Four Continents.

Orzel finished twenty-sixth in the short program at the 2023 World Championships and did not qualify for the free skate.

=== 2023–2024 season ===
Beginning the season at the 2023 CS Nepela Memorial, Orzel came ninth. In his lone appearance on the Grand Prix, he finished in tenth place. At the domestic level, he went on to win the Skate Canada Challenge, the final qualifier to the 2024 Canadian Championships. At the national championships, Orzel had a "disastrous" short program, tripling both planned quad jumps and singling his triple Axel attempt. Tenth in that segment, he recovered with second-place free skate that boosted him to fourth overall. He finished 0.26 points behind bronze medalist Anthony Paradis.

Skate Canada initially declined to name the Canadian team for the 2024 World Championships, pending the results of the 2024 Four Continents Championships in Shanghai, which Orzel attended alongside Wesley Chiu and Roman Sadovsky. Orzel finished seventeenth, and third among the Canadians. The two Canadian berths at the home ice World Championships were ultimately given to Chiu and Sadovsky.

On May 1, Orzel announced that he was starting a new job at Rockbank Capital Corp in the role of Corporate Development and was thus retiring from competitive figure skating.

== Programs ==
Season	Short program	Free skating	Exhibition
2023–2024	Carmina Burana: O Fortuna by Carl Orff choreo. by Lance Vipond	Believer; Tied; Warriors by Imagine Dragons choreo. by Lance Vipond	Who Wants to Live Forever by Queen choreo. by Jeffrey Buttle
2022–2023	Carmina Burana: O Fortuna by Carl Orff choreo. by Lance Vipond	Out of Tears; Paint It Black by The Rolling Stones choreo. by Lance Vipond	Carmina Burana: O Fortuna by Carl Orff choreo. by Lance Vipond
2021–2022	Who Wants to Live Forever by Queen choreo. by Jeffrey Buttle	Warsaw Concerto by Richard Addinsell performed by Daniel Adni choreo. by Joey Russell	In My Blood by Shawn Mendes
2020–2021	Who Wants to Live Forever by Queen choreo. by Jeffrey Buttle	Les Miserables - Symphonic Suite; Suite from Les Miserables and Miss Saigon; Comme un homme (from Les Misérables) by Claude-Michel Schönberg & Alain Boublil choreo. by David Wilson	
2019–2020	In My Blood by Shawn Mendes choreo. by Jeffrey Buttle	Les Miserables - Symphonic Suite; Suite from Les Miserables and Miss Saigon; Comme un homme (from Les Misérables) by Claude-Michel Schönberg & Alain Boublil choreo. by David Wilson; On the Waterfront (soundtrack) by Leonard Bernstein choreo. by David Wilson	
2018–2019	In My Blood by Shawn Mendes choreo. by Jeffrey Buttle	Romeo and Juliet by Nino Rota; Un giorno per noi (from Romeo and Juliet) performed by Josh Groban choreo. by Joey Russell	
2017–2018	Secrets by OneRepublic; Beethoven's Five Secrets by The Piano Guys choreo. by Shae Zukiwsky	Big My Secret (from The Piano) by Michael Nyman; Knowing the Ropes (from Mozart 252) by Michael Nyman choreo. by Alison Purkiss	
2016–2017	Secrets by OneRepublic; Beethoven's Five Secrets by The Piano Guys choreo. by Shae Zukiwsky	The Last Samurai by Hans Zimmer; River Waltz (from The Painted Veil) by Alexandre Desplat; Takiotoshi (Sound of Waterfall) choreo. by Alison Purkiss	
2015–2016			
2014–2015		The Good, the Bad and the Ugly by Ennio Morricone	

== Competitive highlights ==
- GP – Event of the ISU Grand Prix Series
- JGP – Event of the ISU Junior Grand Prix Series
- CS – Event of the ISU Challenger Series
- C – Event cancelled

Competition placements at senior level
Season	2017–18	2018–19	2019–20	2020–21	2021–22	2022–23	2023-24
World Championships						26th	
Four Continents Championships						8th	17th
Canadian Championships	11th	5th	6th	C	9th	2nd	4th
GP Cup of China			11th				
GP NHK Trophy			12th			10th	
GP Skate Canada				C	9th	11th	10th
CS Autumn Classic			6th		1st		
CS Finlandia Trophy						11th	
CS Golden Spin of Zagreb					10th		
CS Nepela Memorial							9th
Bavarian Open		2nd					
Skate Canada Challenge	7th	3rd		5th			1st

Competition placements at junior level
Season	2015–16	2016–17	2017–18	2018–19
World Junior Championships		13th	13th	
Canadian Championships	5th	2nd		
JGP Austria			7th	4th
JGP France		10th		
JGP Germany		2nd		
JGP Poland			3rd	
JGP Slovenia				4th
Bavarian Open		2nd		
Coupe du Printemps	3rd			
Skate Canada Challenge	4th	3rd		

== Detailed results ==
ISU personal best scores in the +5/-5 GOE System
Segment	Type	Score	Event
Total	TSS	226.10	2023 Four Continents Championships
Short program	TSS	80.09	2023 Four Continents Championships
Short program	TES	46.63	2023 Four Continents Championships
Short program	PCS	37.41	2023 CS Nepela Memorial
Free skating	TSS	149.56	2021 Skate Canada International
Free skating	TES	79.46	2021 Skate Canada International
Free skating	PCS	73.00	2021 CS Golden Spin of Zagreb

ISU personal best scores in the +3/-3 GOE System
Segment	Type	Score	Event
Total	TSS	196.30	2016 JGP Germany
Short program	TSS	66.21	2017 World Junior Championships
Short program	TES	37.64	2017 World Junior Championships
Short program	PCS	32.17	2018 World Junior Championships
Free skating	TSS	134.98	2017 JGP Poland
Free skating	TES	71.62	2017 JGP Poland
Free skating	PCS	64.36	2017 JGP Poland

=== Senior level ===
Results in the 2017–18 season
Date	Event	SP		FS		Total	
Date	Event	P	Score	P	Score	P	Score
Nov 28 – Dec 3, 2017	2018 Skate Canada Challenge	11	60.07	5	125.40	7	185.47
Jan 8–14, 2018	(Canada) 2018 Canadian Championships	10	73.69	11	133.97	11	207.66

Results in the 2018–19 season
Date	Event	SP		FS		Total	
Date	Event	P	Score	P	Score	P	Score
Nov 28 – Dec 2, 2018	2019 Skate Canada Challenge	1	73.56	3	123.45	3	197.01
Jan 14–20, 2019	(Canada) 2019 Canadian Championships	4	82.87	6	141.28	5	224.15
Feb 5–10, 2019	(Germany) 2019 Bavarian Open	4	67.93	2	132.58	2	200.51

Results in the 2019–20 season
Date	Event	SP		FS		Total	
Date	Event	P	Score	P	Score	P	Score
Sep 12–14, 2019	(Canada) 2019 CS Autumn Classic International	6	76.64	5	138.34	6	214.98
Nov 8–10, 2019	2019 Cup of China	10	72.22	12	120.38	11	192.60
Nov 22–24, 2019	(Japan) 2019 NHK Trophy	10	70.35	12	125.99	12	196.34
Jan 13–19, 2020	(Canada) 2020 Canadian Championships	8	69.26	6	140.11	6	209.37

Results in the 2020–21 season
Date	Event	SP		FS		Total	
Date	Event	P	Score	P	Score	P	Score
Jan 8–17, 2021	2021 Skate Canada Challenge	3	87.22	8	131.39	5	218.61

Results in the 2021–22 season
Date	Event	SP		FS		Total	
Date	Event	P	Score	P	Score	P	Score
Sep 16–18, 2021	(Canada) 2021 CS Autumn Classic International	1	80.82	1	126.49	1	207.31
Oct 29–31, 2021	2021 Skate Canada International	9	73.19	6	149.56	9	222.75
Dec 7–11, 2021	(Croatia) 2021 CS Golden Spin of Zagreb	8	78.85	11	140.35	10	219.20
Jan 6–12, 2022	(Canada) 2022 Canadian Championships	14	59.13	6	133.79	9	192.92

Results in the 2022–23 season
Date	Event	SP		FS		Total	
Date	Event	P	Score	P	Score	P	Score
Oct 4–9, 2022	(Finland) 2022 CS Finlandia Trophy	6	71.58	13	121.57	11	193.15
Oct 28–30, 2022	2022 Skate Canada International	6	69.69	11	125.73	11	195.42
Nov 18–20, 2022	(Japan) 2022 NHK Trophy	8	73.10	11	129.59	10	202.69
Jan 9–15, 2023	(Canada) 2023 Canadian Championships	2	86.16	4	151.30	2	237.46
Feb 7–12, 2023	(United States) 2023 Four Continents Championships	7	80.09	7	146.01	8	226.10
Mar 22–26, 2023	(Japan) 2023 World Championships	26	67.65	–	–	26	67.65

Results in the 2023–24 season
Date	Event	SP		FS		Total	
Date	Event	P	Score	P	Score	P	Score
Sep 28–30, 2023	(Slovakia) 2023 CS Nepela Memorial	7	77.45	9	136.07	9	213.52
Oct 27–29, 2023	2023 Skate Canada International	6	77.68	10	135.44	10	213.12
Nov 30 – Dec 3, 2023	2024 Skate Canada Challenge	1	78.71	1	144.14	1	222.85
Jan 7–14, 2024	(Canada) 2024 Canadian Championships	10	61.72	2	148.00	4	209.72
Jan 30 – Feb 4, 2024	(China) 2024 Four Continents Championships	17	65.07	17	129.85	17	194.92

=== Junior level ===
Results in the 2015–16 season
Date	Event	SP		FS		Total	
Date	Event	P	Score	P	Score	P	Score
Dec 2–5, 2015	2016 Skate Canada Challenge	5	54.45	4	103.66	4	158.11
Jan 18–24, 2016	(Canada) 2016 Canadian Championships (Junior)	4	51.44	6	102.49	5	153.93
Mar 11–13, 2016	(Luxembourg) 2016 Coupe du Printemps	1	52.45	5	89.24	3	141.69

Results in the 2016–17 season
Date	Event	SP		FS		Total	
Date	Event	P	Score	P	Score	P	Score
Aug 24–27, 2016	2016 JGP France	4	61.65	11	100.67	10	162.32
Oct 5–8, 2016	2016 JGP Germany	5	64.98	2	131.32	2	196.30
Nov 30 – Dec 4, 2016	2017 Skate Canada Challenge	3	60.57	4	110.96	3	171.53
Jan 16–22, 2017	(Canada) 2017 Canadian Championships (Junior)	1	68.16	2	137.90	2	206.06
Feb 14–19, 2017	(Germany) 2017 Bavarian Open	2	71.60	3	125.85	2	197.45
Mar 15–19, 2017	(Taiwan) 2017 World Junior Championships	18	66.21	12	128.20	13	194.41

Results in the 2017–18 season
Date	Event	SP		FS		Total	
Date	Event	P	Score	P	Score	P	Score
Aug 31 – Sep 2, 2017	2017 JGP Austria	6	58.23	7	114.51	7	172.74
Oct 4–7, 2017	2017 JGP Poland	9	61.07	3	134.98	3	196.05
Mar 5–11, 2018	(Bulgaria) 2018 World Junior Championships	15	64.49	12	121.44	13	185.93

Results in the 2018–19 season
Date	Event	SP		FS		Total	
Date	Event	P	Score	P	Score	P	Score
Aug 29 – Sep 1, 2018	2018 JGP Austria	1	79.66	6	120.80	4	200.46
Oct 3–6, 2018	2018 JGP Slovenia	5	73.24	4	139.70	4	212.94
