= Mana Kawabe =

Japanese figure skater

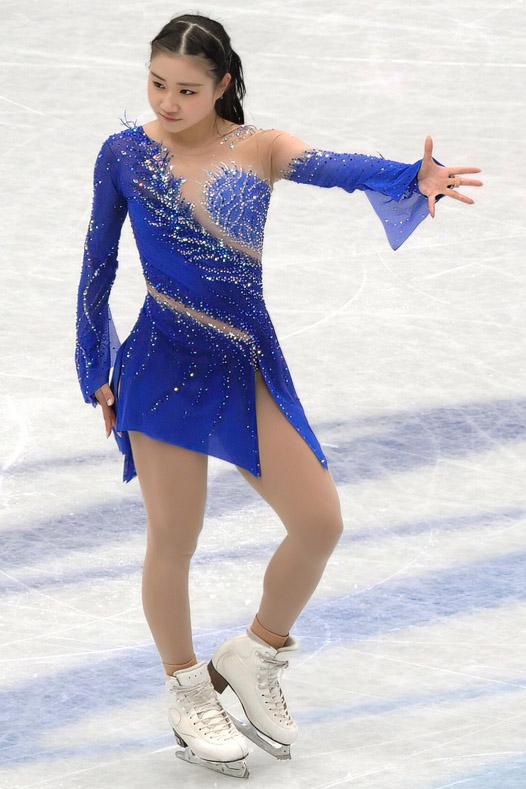
- Kawabe during her free skate at the 2022 World Championships

Personal information
- Native name: 河辺 愛菜
- Born: October 31, 2004 (age 22) Nagoya, Aichi, Japan
- Home town: Toyota, Japan
- Height: 1.55 m (5 ft 1 in)

Figure skating career
- Country: Japan
- Coach: Masakazu Kagiyama; Keisuke Kodaira
- Skating club: Chukyo University
- Began skating: 2009
Japan Championships
Bronze medal – third place	2021–22 Saitama	Singles

Mana Kawabe (河辺 愛菜, Kawabe Mana; born October 31, 2004) is a Japanese figure skater. She is the 2026 Coupe du Printemps champion, 2021 NHK Trophy silver medalist, the 2022 Grand Prix of Espoo bronze medalist, the 2022 CS U.S. Classic bronze medalist, the 2021–22 Japanese national bronze medalist, and the 2019–20 Japanese junior national champion. Kawabe is the eighteenth woman to land a clean triple Axel internationally.

She represented Japan at the 2022 Winter Olympics.

== Personal life ==
Mana Kawabe was born on October 31, 2004, in Nagoya, Japan. She enjoys reading as a hobby.

In addition, Kawabe looks up to her former training mate Rika Kihira.

== Career ==
=== Early career ===
Kawabe began skating in 2009 after being inspired by fellow Nagoya native Mao Asada. She was coached by Hiroshi Nagakubo, Yoriko Naruse, Miho Kawaume, and Yuko Hongo at Howa Sports Land in Nagoya until Nagakubo's retirement in 2017. Kawabe then switched to her former coaches, Mie Hamada, Yamato Tamura, Haruko Okamoto, and Cathy Reed, and moved to train with them in Takatsuki.

Kawabe is the 2015–16 Japanese national novice B silver medalist. On the advanced novice level internationally, she is the 2017 Coupe du Printemps and 2017 Asian Open Trophy champion. Kawabe did not qualify for the 2018–19 Japan Junior Championships and competed with an injury for much of the season.

=== 2019–2020 season ===
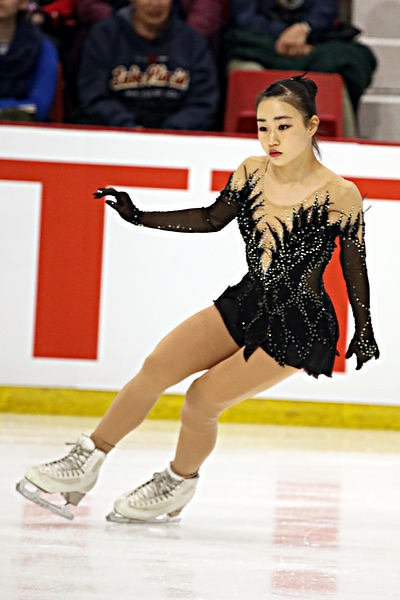
Kawabe at the 2019 JGP United States

Kawabe made her junior international debut at 2019 JGP United States, placing fifth. She then improved to fourth at 2019 JGP Croatia. In October 2019, Kawabe won Kinki Regionals ahead of Moa Iwano and Riko Takino before winning Western Sectionals in November ahead of Nana Araki and Hanna Yoshida.

At the 2019–20 Japan Junior Championships, Kawabe led Tomoe Kawabata and Rino Matsuike in the short program by over a point. She then landed her first officially ratified triple Axel in the free skate and completed eight clean triple jumps to take the title over Kawabata and Yoshida by nearly fifteen points. Kawabe told the media afterwards: "This is unbelievable. I didn’t think I could win." As junior national champion, she was named to represent Japan at the 2020 Winter Youth Olympics and the 2020 World Junior Championships.

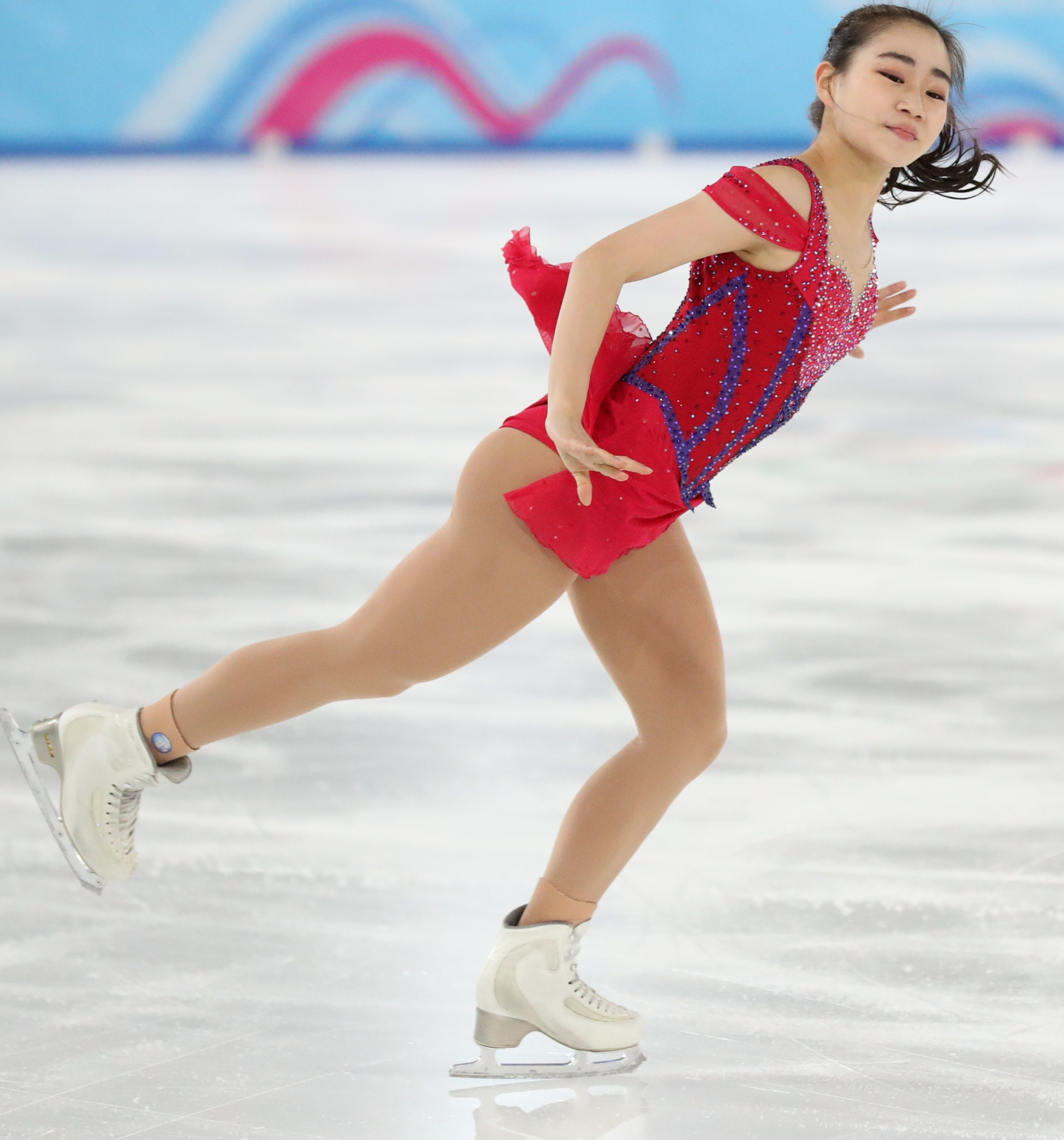
Kawabe at the 2020 Winter Youth Olympics

Kawabe was also invited to compete in the senior division at the 2019–20 Japan Championships, alongside the rest of the top six finishers in the junior division.

Kawabe struggled in both the short program and the free skating at 2019–20 Japan Championships and finished in thirteenth place overall. However, she successfully landed her opening triple Axel in the free skating and said her "satisfaction was about 65%."

At the 2020 Winter Youth Olympics in January, Kawabe set personal bests in all segments to finish fourth overall behind You Young of South Korea and Russians Kseniia Sinitsyna and Anna Frolova. She expressed disappointment at her mistakes on her triple Axel and her triple Lutz. Kawabe was the only member of the Japanese team not drawn for the team event.

Kawabe skated a clean short program to place eighth at the 2020 World Junior Championships but made several mistakes in the free skating to drop to eleventh overall.

=== 2020–2021 season ===
Kawabe won the silver medal at the Kinki Regional Championship before coming fourth at Western Sectionals. She was assigned to make her senior international debut at the 2020 NHK Trophy, in a Grand Prix field that, due to the COVID-19 pandemic, was attended primarily by Japanese skaters. She was sixth in the short program, falling on her attempted triple Axel. She was sixth in the free skate and overall as well.

Kawabe ranked sixth at the 2020–21 Japan Championships.

=== 2021–2022 season ===
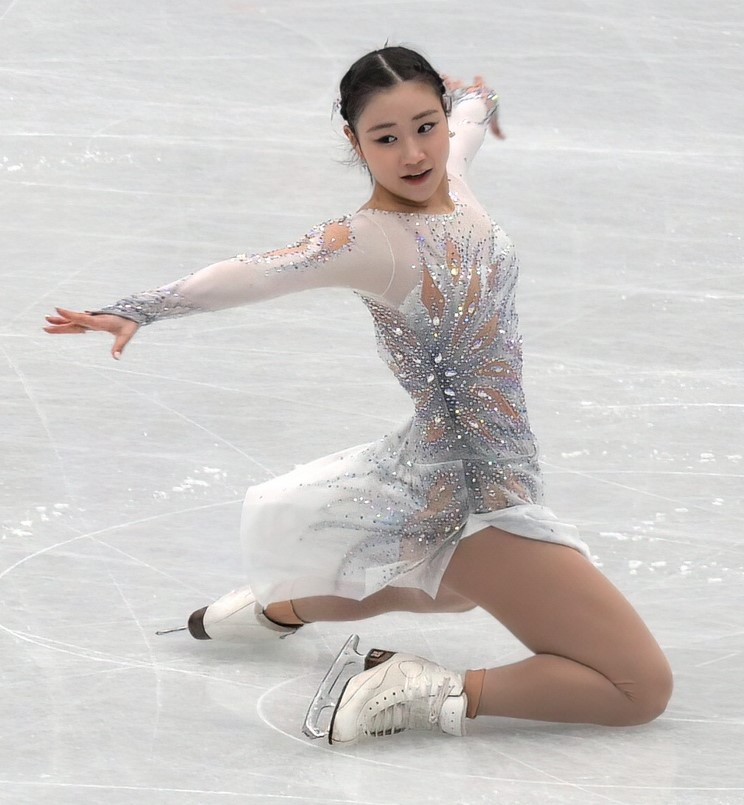
Kawabe during her short program at the 2022 World Championships

Initially without any Grand Prix assignments, Kawabe was named as a replacement skater at the 2021 Skate Canada International following the withdrawal of Alexia Paganini. She was twelfth of twelve skaters after the short program but was sixth in the free skate and rose to ninth place overall. She landed a triple Axel in the free skate, albeit deemed a quarter short of rotation by the technical panel, obtaining a new personal best in that segment and in total score. Kawabe received a second assignment to the 2021 NHK Trophy, following the injury-related withdrawal of Rika Kihira. Second in the short program with a landed triple Axel, she was fourth in the free skate but remained in second place overall and took the silver medal.

At the 2021–22 Japan Championships, Kawabe placed third in the short program, landing a triple Axel in that segment. She was third in the free as well, again landing the triple Axel but with a few other jump errors. The following day she was named to the Japanese Olympic team. In the 2022 Winter Olympics women's event short program, Kawabe fell on her triple Axel attempt, scoring 62.69 and placing fifteenth in the segment. An error-riddled free skate saw her drop to twenty-third. She was fifteenth at the 2022 World Championships to end the season.

=== 2022–2023 season ===
Kawabe began her season with a bronze medal at the 2022 CS U.S. International Figure Skating Classic. On the Grand Prix, she first competed at the 2022 Grand Prix de France, where she finished third in the short program, but dropped to sixth place overall after an error-riddled free skate. At her second event, the 2022 Grand Prix of Espoo, Kawabe was again third in the short program despite a slight under rotation on her triple flip. She indicated that she had been focusing on training her free skate, hoping to avoid "repeating the same mistakes." She managed a season's best score in the free skate, placing second in that second and holding third overall to take the bronze medal.

At the 2022–23 Japan Championships, Kawabe came in ninth place. Two months later, she won the bronze medal at the International Challenge Cup, joining Kaori Sakamoto and Mai Mihara in a Japanese sweep of the podium, and finishing second in the free skate after a disappointing ninth in the short program.

=== 2023–2024 season ===
Beginning the season on the Grand Prix at the 2023 Skate America, Kawabe placed eighth after a difficult free skate where she fell twice. She remarked afterward "I have no idea what happened with my jumps." She went on to place ninth at the 2023 Grand Prix of Espoo.

Kawabe came in thirteenth place at the 2023–24 Japan Championships.

=== 2024–2025 season ===
Kawabe competed at the 2024–25 Japan Championships, where she finished thirteenth.

In February, it was announced that Kawabe made a coaching change from Mihoko Higuchi to Masakazu Kagiyama.

=== 2025–2026 season ===
Kawabe competed at the 2025–26 Japan Championships, where she finished twelfth overall.

On her return to international competition at the 2026 Coupe du Printemps, she finished first in both the short program and the free skate, winning gold overall.

== Programs ==
Season	Short program	Free skating	Exhibition
2025–2026	La La Land; Stroll Up the Hill; Another Day of Sun by Justin Hurwitz choreo. by Shin Yea-ji	Fountain of Eternity; Keeper of the Night by Eternal Eclipse choreo. by Lori Nichol	WICKED by ALLDAY PROJECT choreo. by Shin Yea-ji
2024–2025	Someone Like You by Adele choreo. by Mihoko Higuchi	Paint It, Black performed by Ramin Djawadi; Paint It Black performed by Hidden Citizens ft. Rånya choreo. by Mihoko Higuchi	Boléro by Maurice Ravel choreo. by Mihoko Higuchi
2023–2024	Haunted by Dillistone; Lick It by Valentino Khan choreo. by Mihoko Higuchi	Boléro by Maurice Ravel choreo. by Mihoko Higuchi	
2022–2023	When The Party's Over; Bury a Friend; Bad Guy by Billie Eilish & Finneas O'Connell choreo. by Mihoko Higuchi	Drowning by Anne Sila choreo. by Mihoko Higuchi	Always Remember Us This Way by Lady Gaga performed by Lauren Spencer Smith; Fingers Crossed by Lauren Spencer Smith
2021–2022	Shadow 5; Winter 1 by Antonio Vivaldi performed by Max Richter choreo. by Cathy Reed	Miracle by Yoshiki performed by Sarah Brightman choreo. by Lori Nichol	
2020–2021	Fire Dance by Jennifer Thomas choreo. by Cathy Reed	Miracle by Yoshiki performed by Sarah Brightman choreo. by Lori Nichol	The Edge of Glory by Lady Gaga
2019–2020	You're a Mean One, Mr. Grinch performed by Lindsey Stirling ft. Sabrina Carpenter choreo. by Cathy Reed	Black Swan by Clint Mansell choreo. by Cathy Reed	

== Competitive highlights ==
- GP – Event of the ISU Grand Prix Series
- JGP – Event of the ISU Junior Grand Prix Series
- CS – Event of the ISU Challenger Series
- TBD – Assigned
- WD - Withdraw
- Medals at team events are awarded for the team results only. Individual placements at team events are listed in parentheses.

Competition placements at senior level
Season	2019–20	2020–21	2021–22	2022–23	2023–24	2024–25	2025–26
Winter Olympics			22nd				
World Championships			15th				
Japan Championships	13th	6th	3rd	9th	13th	13th	12th
GP Finland				3rd	9th		
GP France				6th			
GP NHK Trophy		6th	2nd				
GP Skate America					8th		
GP Skate Canada			9th				
CS Cup of Austria			WD				
CS U.S. Classic				3rd			
Challenge Cup				3rd			
Coupe du Printemps							1st
Japan Open			2nd (3rd)				

=== Junior results ===
Competition placements at junior level
Season	2016–17	2019–20
Winter Youth Olympics		4th
World Junior Championships		11th
Japan Championships	21st	1st
JGP Croatia		4th
JGP United States		5th

== Detailed results ==
ISU personal best scores in the +5/-5 GOE System
Segment	Type	Score	Event
Total	TSS	205.54	2021 NHK Trophy
Short program	TSS	73.88	2021 NHK Trophy
Short program	TES	42.71	2021 NHK Trophy
Short program	PCS	31.95	2022 Grand Prix de France
Free skating	TSS	133.22	2021 Skate Canada
Free skating	TES	70.31	2021 Skate Canada
Free skating	PCS	66.55	2022 Grand Prix of Espoo

=== Senior level ===
Results in the 2019–20 season
Date	Event	SP		FS		Total	
Date	Event	P	Score	P	Score	P	Score
Dec 18–22, 2019	2019–20 Japan Championships	14	56.52	10	112.76	13	169.28

Results in the 2020–21 season
Date	Event	SP		FS		Total	
Date	Event	P	Score	P	Score	P	Score
Nov 27–29, 2020	(Japan) 2020 NHK Trophy	6	63.62	6	122.08	6	185.70
Dec 24–27, 2020	2020–21 Japan Championships	8	64.70	5	136.88	6	201.58

Results in the 2021–22 season
Date	Event	SP		FS		Total	
Date	Event	P	Score	P	Score	P	Score
Oct 3, 2021	2021 Japan Open	–	–	3	134.91	2	–
Oct 29-31, 2021	2021 Skate Canada International	12	53.30	6	133.22	9	186.52
Nov 12–14, 2021	(Japan) 2021 NHK Trophy	2	73.88	4	131.56	2	205.44
Dec 22–26, 2021	2021–22 Japan Championships	3	74.27	3	135.38	3	209.65
Feb 15–17, 2022	(China) 2022 Winter Olympics	14	62.69	22	104.04	22	166.73
Mar 21–27, 2022	(France) 2022 World Championships	12	63.68	15	118.76	15	182.44

Results in the 2022–23 season
Date	Event	SP		FS		Total	
Date	Event	P	Score	P	Score	P	Score
Sep 13–16, 2022	(United States) 2022 CS U.S. Classic	2	62.68	3	117.43	3	180.11
Nov 4–6, 2022	2022 Grand Prix de France	3	68.83	6	113.67	6	182.50
Nov 25–27, 2022	(Finland) 2022 Grand Prix of Espoo	3	67.03	2	130.38	3	197.41
Dec 21–25, 2022	2022–23 Japan Championships	6	64.51	11	125.93	9	190.44
Feb 23–26, 2023	(Netherlands) 2023 International Challenge Cup	9	57.10	2	135.36	3	192.46

Results in the 2023–24 season
Date	Event	SP		FS		Total	
Date	Event	P	Score	P	Score	P	Score
Oct 20–22, 2023	(Japan) 2023 Skate America	8	59.74	9	105.66	8	165.40
Nov 17–19, 2023	(Finland) 2023 Grand Prix of Espoo	12	50.12	7	110.88	9	161.00
Dec 20–24, 2023	2023–24 Japan Championships	5	67.25	18	112.46	13	179.71

Results in the 2024–25 season
Date	Event	SP		FS		Total	
Date	Event	P	Score	P	Score	P	Score
Dec 19–22, 2024	2024–25 Japan Championships	14	62.25	10	127.98	13	190.23

Results in the 2025–26 season
Date	Event	SP		FS		Total	
Date	Event	P	Score	P	Score	P	Score
Dec 18–21, 2025	2025–26 Japan Championships	10	64.12	14	123.24	12	187.36
Mar 13–15, 2026	(Luxembourg) 2026 Coupe du Printemps	1	70.13	1	124.82	1	194.95

=== Junior level ===
Results in the 2016–17 season
Date	Event	SP		FS		Total	
Date	Event	P	Score	P	Score	P	Score
Nov 23–25, 2016	2016–17 Japan Championships (Junior)	24	41.41	20	82.53	3	123.94

Results in the 2019–20 season
Date	Event	SP		FS		Total	
Date	Event	P	Score	P	Score	P	Score
Aug 28–31, 2019	2019 JGP United States	6	53.78	5	109.26	5	163.04
Sep 25–28, 2019	2019 JGP Croatia	7	53.12	4	110.61	4	163.73
Nov 15–17, 2019	2019–20 Japan Championships (Junior)	1	64.95	1	128.62	1	193.57
Jan 10–15, 2020	(Switzerland) 2020 Winter Youth Olympics	4	65.84	3	119.38	4	185.22
Mar 2–8, 2020	(Estonia) 2020 World Junior Championships	8	64.47	13	105.15	11	169.62
