= 2021 Skate Canada International =

- Type: Grand Prix
- Date: 29 – 31 October
- Season: 2021–22
- Location: Vancouver, British Columbia, Canada
- Host: Skate Canada
- Venue: Thunderbird Sports Centre

Champions
- Men's singles: (United States) Nathan Chen
- Women's singles: (Russia) Kamila Valieva
- Pairs: (China) Sui Wenjing and Han Cong
- Ice dance: (Canada) Piper Gilles and Paul Poirier
- Previous: 2019 Skate Canada International
- Next: 2022 Skate Canada International
- Previous Grand Prix: 2021 Skate America
- Next Grand Prix: 2021 Gran Premio d'Italia

The 2021 Skate Canada International was a figure skating competition sanctioned by the International Skating Union (ISU), organized and hosted by Skate Canada, and the second event of the 2021–22 ISU Grand Prix of Figure Skating series. It was held at the Thunderbird Sports Centre in Vancouver, British Columbia, from 29 to 31 October 2021. Medals were awarded in men's singles, women's singles, pair skating, and ice dance. Skaters earned points based on their results, and the top skaters or teams in each discipline at the end of the season were then invited to then compete at the 2021–22 Grand Prix Final in Osaka, Japan. Nathan Chen of the United States won the men's event, Kamila Valieva of Russia won the women's event, Sui Wenjing and Han Cong of China won the pairs event, and Piper Gilles and Paul Poirier of Canada won the ice dance event.

== Background ==
The ISU Grand Prix of Figure Skating is a series of seven events sanctioned by the International Skating Union (ISU) and held during the autumn: six qualifying events and the Grand Prix of Figure Skating Final. This allows skaters to perfect their programs earlier in the season, as well as compete against the same skaters whom they would later encounter at the World Championships. Skaters earn points based on their results in their respective competitions and after the six qualifying events, the top skaters or teams in each discipline are invited to compete at the Grand Prix Final. Skate Canada International debuted in 1973, and when the ISU launched the Grand Prix series in 1995, Skate Canada International was one of the five qualifying events. It has been a Grand Prix event every year since, except for 2020, when it was cancelled due to the COVID-19 pandemic.

== Changes to preliminary assignments ==
The International Skating Union announced the preliminary assignments on 29 June 2021.

Discipline	Withdrew		Added		Notes	Ref.
Discipline	Date	Skater(s)	Date	Skater(s)	Notes	Ref.
Men	—N/a		16 September	(Canada) Conrad Orzel	Host pick	
Women	28 September	(Switzerland) Alexia Paganini	30 September	(Japan) Mana Kawabe		
Women	18 October	(Japan) Rika Kihira	19 October	(Japan) Mai Mihara	Injury	

== Required performance elements ==
=== Single skating ===
Men and women competing in single skating performed their short programs on Friday, 29 October. Lasting no more than 2 minutes 40 seconds, the short program had to include the following elements:

For men: one double or triple Axel; one triple or quadruple jump; one jump combination consisting of a double jump and a triple jump, two triple jumps, or a quadruple jump and a double jump or triple jump; one flying spin; one camel spin or sit spin with a change of foot; one spin combination with a change of foot; and a step sequence using the full ice surface.

For women: one double or triple Axel; one triple jump; one jump combination consisting of a double jump and a triple jump, or two triple jumps; one flying spin; one layback spin, sideways leaning spin, camel spin, or sit spin without a change of foot; one spin combination with a change of foot; and one step sequence using the full ice surface.

Men and women then performed their free skates on Saturday, 30 October. The free skate for both men and women could last no more than 4 minutes, and had to include the following: seven jump elements, of which one had to be an Axel-type jump; three spins, of which one had to be a spin combination, one had to be a flying spin, and one had to be a spin with only one position; a step sequence; and a choreographic sequence.

=== Pair skating ===
Couples competing in pair skating performed their short programs on Friday, 29 October. Lasting no more than 2 minutes 40 seconds, it had to include the following elements: one pair lift, one twist lift, one double or triple throw jump, one double or triple solo jump, one solo spin combination with a change of foot, one death spiral, and a step sequence using the full ice surface.

Couples performed their free skates on Saturday, 30 October. The free skate could last no more than 4 minutes, and had to include the following: three pair lifts, of which one had to be a twist lift; two different throw jumps; one solo jump; one jump combination or sequence; one pair spin combination; one death spiral; and a choreographic sequence.

=== Ice dance ===
Couples competing in ice dance performed their rhythm dances on Friday, 29 October. Lasting no more than 2 minutes 50 seconds, the theme of the rhythm dance this season was "street dance rhythms". Examples of applicable dance styles included, but were not limited, to: hip-hop, disco, swing, krump, popping, funk, jazz, reggae (reggaeton), and blues. The required pattern dance element was the Midnight Blues. The rhythm dance had to include the following elements: the pattern dance, the pattern dance step sequence, one dance lift, one set of sequential twizzles, and one step sequence.

Couples performed their free dances on Saturday, 30 October. The free dance performance could last no longer than 4 minutes, and had to include the following: three dance lifts, one dance spin, one set of synchronized twizzles, one step sequence in hold, one step sequence while on one skate and not touching, and three choreographic elements, of which one had to be a choreographic character step sequence.

== Judging ==
For the 2021–2022 season, all of the technical elements in any figure skating performance – such as jumps, spins, and lifts – were assigned a predetermined base point value and were then scored by a panel of nine judges on a scale from -5 to 5 based on their quality of execution. The judging panel's Grade of Execution (GOE) was determined by calculating the trimmed mean (that is, an average after deleting the highest and lowest scores), and this GOE was added to the base value to come up with the final score for each element. The panel's scores for all elements were added together to generate a total element score. At the same time, judges evaluated each performance based on five program components – skating skills, transitions, performance, composition, and interpretation of the music – and assigned a score from .25 to 10 in .25 point increments. The judging panel's final score for each program component was also determined by calculating the trimmed mean. Those scores were then multiplied by the factor shown on the following chart; the results were added together to generate a total program component score.

Program component factoring
Discipline	Short program or Rhythm dance	Free skate or Free dance
Men	1.00	2.00
Women	0.80	1.60
Pairs	0.80	1.60
Ice dance	0.80	1.20

Deductions were applied for certain violations like time infractions, stops and restarts, or falls. The total element score and total program component score were added together, minus any deductions, to generate a final performance score for each skater or team.

== Records and achievements ==
The following new senior ISU best scores were set during this competition.

Disc.	Segment	Skater(s)	Score	Date	Ref.
Women	Free skating	(Russia) Kamila Valieva	180.89	30 October 2021	
Women	Combined total	(Russia) Kamila Valieva	265.08	30 October 2021	

== Medal summary ==
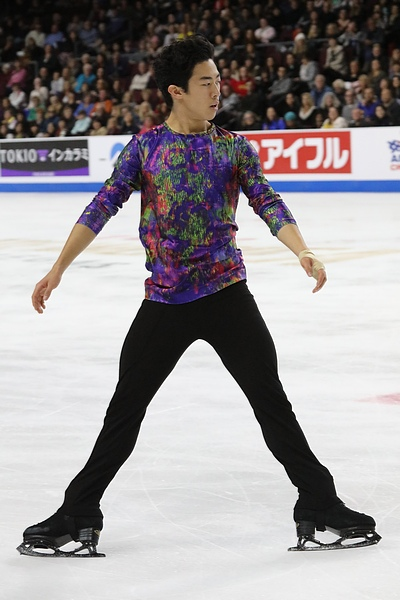
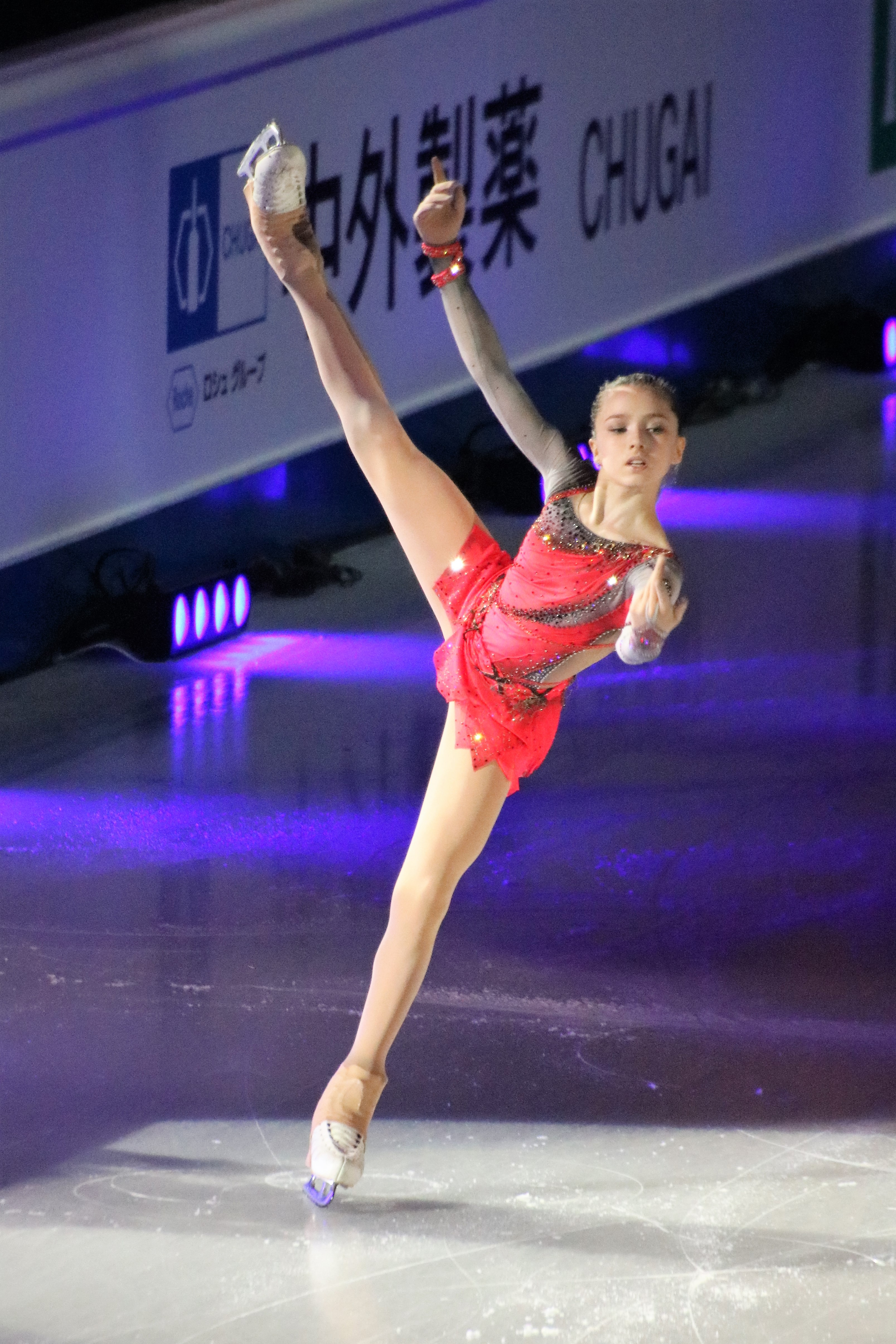
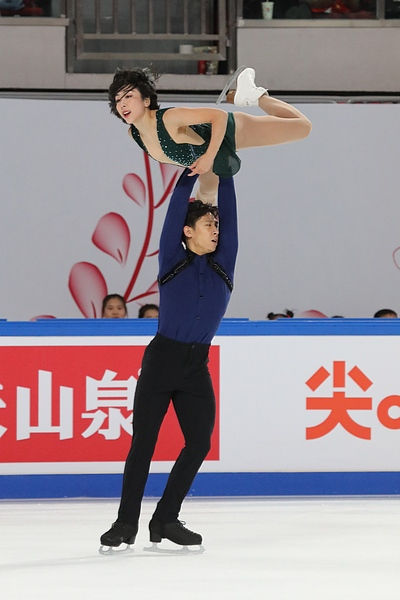
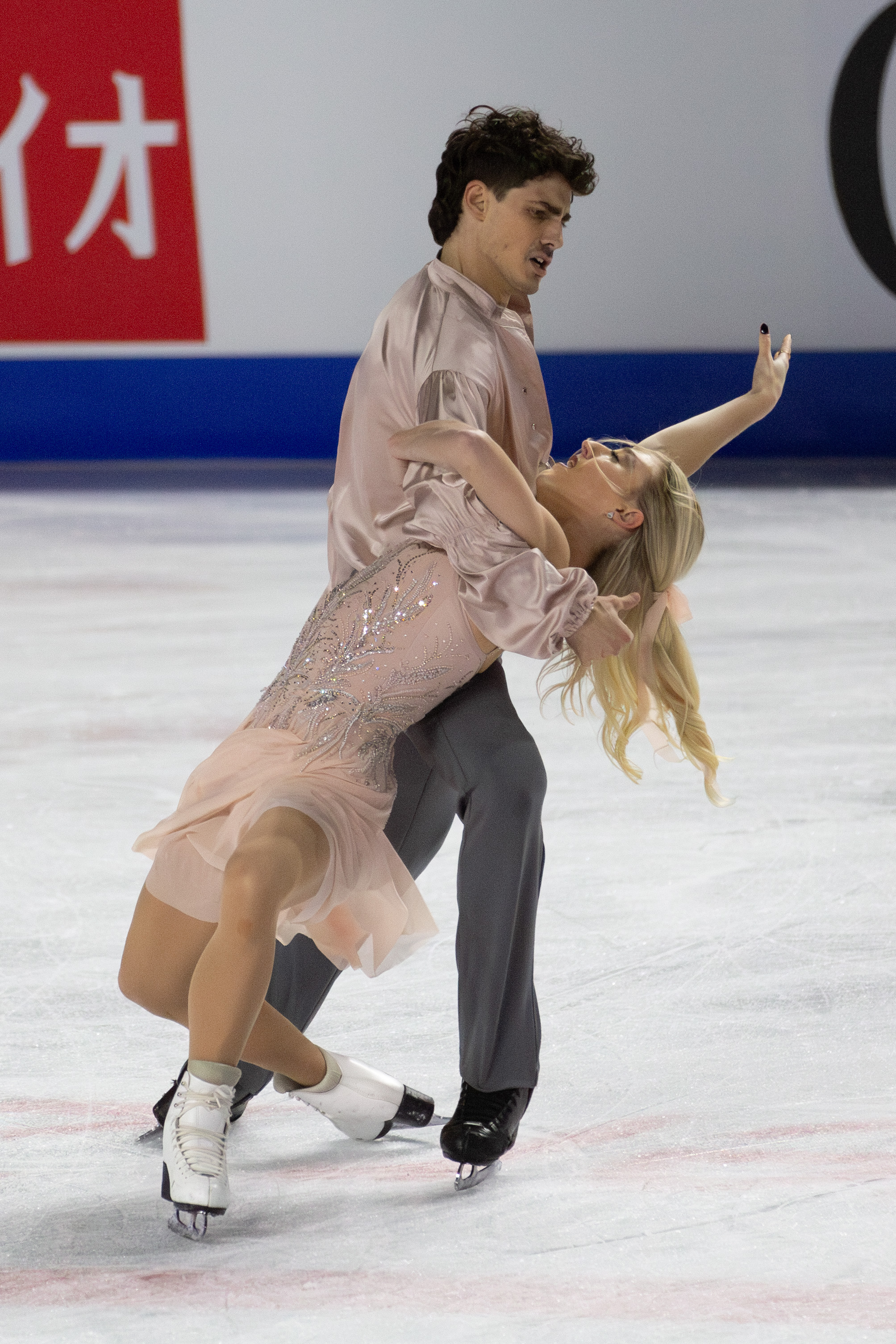
From left to right: The 2021 Skate Canada International champions: Nathan Chen of the United States (men's singles); Kamila Valieva of Russia (women's singles); Sui Wenjing and Han Cong of China (pair skating); and Piper Gilles and Paul Poirier of Canada (ice dance)

Medalists
Discipline	Gold	Silver	Bronze
Men	(United States) Nathan Chen	(United States) Jason Brown	(Russia) Evgeni Semenenko
Women	(Russia) Kamila Valieva	(Russia) Elizaveta Tuktamysheva	(Russia) Alena Kostornaia
Pairs	(China); Sui Wenjing; Han Cong	(Russia); Daria Pavliuchenko; Denis Khodykin	(United States); Ashley Cain-Gribble; Timothy LeDuc
Ice dance	(Canada); Piper Gilles; Paul Poirier	(Italy); Charlène Guignard; Marco Fabbri	(Spain); Olivia Smart; Adrián Díaz

== Results ==
=== Men's singles ===
Men's results
Rank	Skater	Nation	Total points	SP		FS	
1st place, gold medalist(s)	Nathan Chen	United States	307.18	1	106.72	1	200.46
2nd place, silver medalist(s)	Jason Brown	United States	259.55	2	94.00	3	165.55
3rd place, bronze medalist(s)	Evgeni Semenenko	Russia	256.01	5	87.71	2	168.30
4	Makar Ignatov	Russia	244.17	4	89.79	5	154.38
5	Keegan Messing	Canada	238.34	3	93.28	10	145.06
6	Morisi Kvitelashvili	Georgia	232.87	12	71.60	4	161.27
7	Sōta Yamamoto	Japan	225.74	7	78.78	8	146.96
8	Alexander Samarin	Russia	224.20	8	78.55	9	145.65
9	Conrad Orzel	Canada	222.75	9	73.19	6	149.56
10	Keiji Tanaka	Japan	222.20	6	78.83	12	143.37
11	Tomoki Hiwatashi	United States	221.77	11	72.92	7	148.85
12	Roman Sadovsky	Canada	217.73	10	72.94	11	144.79

=== Women's singles ===
Women's results
Rank	Skater	Nation	Total points	SP		FS	
1st place, gold medalist(s)	Kamila Valieva	Russia	265.08	1	84.19	1	180.89
2nd place, silver medalist(s)	Elizaveta Tuktamysheva	Russia	232.88	2	81.24	2	151.64
3rd place, bronze medalist(s)	Alena Kostornaia	Russia	214.54	3	75.58	4	138.96
4	Mai Mihara	Japan	210.01	7	67.89	3	142.12
5	Alysa Liu	United States	206.53	4	73.63	7	132.90
6	Wakaba Higuchi	Japan	205.27	5	69.41	5	135.86
7	Lee Hae-in	South Korea	190.00	8	62.63	8	127.37
8	Madeline Schizas	Canada	186.56	9	62.61	9	123.95
9	Mana Kawabe	Japan	186.52	12	53.30	6	133.22
10	Karen Chen	United States	183.41	6	68.74	10	114.67
11	Emily Bausback	Canada	159.88	10	59.53	11	100.35
12	Alison Schumacher	Canada	151.19	11	55.47	12	95.72

=== Pairs ===
Pairs results
Rank	Team	Nation	Total points	SP		FS	
1st place, gold medalist(s)	Sui Wenjing; Han Cong	China	224.05	1	78.94	1	145.11
2nd place, silver medalist(s)	Daria Pavliuchenko; Denis Khodykin	Russia	193.08	2	69.46	3	123.62
3rd place, bronze medalist(s)	Ashley Cain-Gribble; Timothy LeDuc	United States	189.90	6	61.68	2	128.22
4	Vanessa James; Eric Radford	Canada	187.92	5	65.02	4	122.90
5	Minerva Fabienne Hase; Nolan Seegert	Germany	186.82	3	67.93	5	118.89
6	Kirsten Moore-Towers; Michael Marinaro	Canada	180.25	4	66.43	6	113.82
7	Lori-Ann Matte; Thierry Ferland	Canada	168.81	7	57.25	7	111.56
8	Zoe Jones; Christopher Boyadji	Great Britain	134.68	8	48.80	8	85.88

=== Ice dance ===
Ice dance results
Rank	Team	Nation	Total points	RD		FD	
1st place, gold medalist(s)	Piper Gilles; Paul Poirier	Canada	210.97	1	85.65	1	125.32
2nd place, silver medalist(s)	Charlène Guignard; Marco Fabbri	Italy	200.05	2	78.82	2	121.23
3rd place, bronze medalist(s)	Olivia Smart; Adrián Díaz	Spain	192.93	3	76.97	3	115.96
4	Caroline Green; Michael Parsons	United States	186.51	4	72.40	4	114.11
5	Diana Davis; Gleb Smolkin	Russia	180.57	7	70.66	5	109.91
6	Marjorie Lajoie; Zachary Lagha	Canada	179.07	6	71.87	6	107.20
7	Lilah Fear; Lewis Gibson	Great Britain	178.08	5	71.89	7	106.19
8	Christina Carreira; Anthony Ponomarenko	United States	168.76	8	68.96	8	99.80
9	Elizaveta Shanaeva; Devid Naryzhnyy	Russia	160.66	9	68.53	10	92.13
10	Haley Sales; Nikolas Wamsteeker	Canada	156.56	10	60.75	9	95.81

== Works cited ==
- "Special Regulations & Technical Rules – Single & Pair Skating and Ice Dance 2021". International Skating Union. Archived from the original on 4 April 2022.
