= 2021 Gran Premio d'Italia =

International figure skating competition

- Type: Grand Prix competition
- Date: 5 – 7 November
- Season: 2021–22
- Location: Turin, Italy
- Host: Italian Ice Sports Federation
- Venue: Torino Palavela

Champions
- Men's singles: (Japan) Yuma Kagiyama
- Women's singles: (Russia) Anna Shcherbakova
- Pairs: (China) Sui Wenjing and Han Cong
- Ice dance: (France) Gabriella Papadakis and Guillaume Cizeron
- Previous Grand Prix: 2021 Skate Canada International
- Next Grand Prix: 2021 NHK Trophy

The 2021 Gran Premio d'Italia was a figure skating competition sanctioned by the International Skating Union (ISU), organized and hosted by the Italian Ice Sports Federation (Italian: Federazione Italiana Sport del Ghiaccio), and the third event of the 2021–22 ISU Grand Prix of Figure Skating series. It was held at the Torino Palavela in Turin, Italy, from 5 to 7 November 2021. Medals were awarded in men's singles, women's singles, pair skating, and ice dance. Skaters earned points based on their results, and the top skaters or teams in each discipline at the end of the season were then invited to then compete at the 2021–22 Grand Prix Final in Osaka, Japan. Yuma Kagiyama of Japan won the men's event, Anna Shcherbakova of Russia won the women's event, Sui Wenjing and Han Cong of China won the pairs event, and Gabriella Papadakis and Guillaume Cizeron of France won the ice dance event.

== Background ==
The ISU Grand Prix of Figure Skating is a series of seven events sanctioned by the International Skating Union (ISU) and held during the autumn: six qualifying events and the Grand Prix Final. This allows skaters to perfect their programs earlier in the season, as well as compete against the skaters with whom they will later compete at the World Championships. This series also provides the viewing public with additional televised skating, which was in high demand. Skaters earn points based on their results in their respective competitions and the top skaters or teams in each discipline are invited to compete at the Grand Prix Final.

The 2021 Cup of China, originally scheduled to be held in Chongqing, was cancelled due to travel and quarantine restrictions related to the COVID-19 pandemic. In an attempt to preserve the Grand Prix series, the ISU asked other interested ISU members to apply as hosts. The Gran Premio d'Italia was announced as its replacement. In addition to the successful bid from the Italian federation, the ISU also received applications from the Hungarian Skating Federation and U.S. Figure Skating. The ISU announced the preliminary list of entrants on 29 June 2021. The Gran Premio d'Italia was held from 5 to 7 November 2021 at the Torino Palavela in Turin, Italy.

== Required performance elements ==
=== Single skating ===
Men and women competing in single skating performed their short programs on 5 November. Lasting 2 minutes 40 seconds (+/− 10 seconds), the short program had to include the following elements:

For men: one double or triple Axel; one triple or quadruple jump; one jump combination consisting of a double jump and a triple jump, two triple jumps, or a quadruple jump and a double jump or triple jump; one flying spin; one camel spin or sit spin with a change of foot; one spin combination with a change of foot; and a step sequence using the full ice surface.

For women: one double or triple Axel; one triple jump; one jump combination consisting of a double jump and a triple jump, or two triple jumps; one flying spin; one layback spin, sideways leaning spin, camel spin, or sit spin without a change of foot; one spin combination with a change of foot; and one step sequence using the full ice surface.

Men and women then performed their free skates on 6 November. Lasting 4 minutes (+/− 10 seconds), the free skate had to include the following: seven jump elements, of which one had to be an Axel-type jump; three spins, of which one had to be a spin combination, one a flying spin, and one a spin with only one position; a step sequence; and a choreographic sequence.

=== Pair skating ===
Couples competing in pair skating performed their short programs on 5 November. Lasting 2 minutes 40 seconds (+/− 10 seconds), the short program had to include the following elements: one pair lift, one twist lift, one double or triple throw jump, one double or triple solo jump, one solo spin combination with a change of foot, one death spiral, and a step sequence using the full ice surface.

Couples performed their free skates on 6 November. Lasting 4 minutes (+/− 10 seconds), the free skate had to include the following: three pair lifts, of which one had to be a twist lift; two different throw jumps; one solo jump; one jump combination or sequence; one pair spin combination; one death spiral; and a choreographic sequence.

=== Ice dance ===
Couples competing in ice dance performed their rhythm dances on 5 November. Lasting 2 minutes 50 seconds (+/− 10 seconds), the theme of the rhythm dance this season was "street dance rhythms". Examples of applicable dance styles included hip-hop, disco, swing, krump, popping, funk, jazz, reggae (reggaeton), and blues. The required pattern dance element was the Midnight Blues. The rhythm dance had to include the following elements: the pattern dance, the pattern dance step sequence, one dance lift, one set of sequential twizzles, and one step sequence.

Couples performed their free dances on 6 November. Lasting 4 minutes (+/− 10 seconds), the free dance had to include the following: three dance lifts, one dance spin, one set of synchronized twizzles, one step sequence in hold, one step sequence while on one skate and not in hold, and three choreographic elements, of which one had to be a choreographic character step sequence.

== Judging ==
Skaters were judged according to the required technical elements of their program (such as jumps and spins), as well as the overall presentation of their program, based on five program components (skating skills, transitions, performance, composition, and musical interpretation). Each technical element in a figure skating performance was assigned a predetermined base point value and scored by a panel of nine judges on a scale from −5 to +5 based on the quality of its execution. Each Grade of Execution (GOE) from –5 to +5 was assigned a value as indicated on the Scale of Values. (Note: The International Skating Union had originally published a new Scale of Values for the 2020/21 season, but chose to cancel it, reverting back to the scale from the 2019/20 season.) For example, a triple Axel was worth a base value of 8.00 points, and a GOE of +3 was worth 2.40 points, so a triple Axel with a GOE of +3 earned 10.40 points. The judging panel's GOE for each element was determined by calculating the trimmed mean (the average after discarding the highest and lowest scores). The panel's scores for all elements were added together to generate a Total Elements Score. At the same time, the judges evaluated each performance based on the five aforementioned program components and assigned each a score from 0.25 to 10 in 0.25-point increments. The judging panel's final score for each program component was also determined by calculating the trimmed mean. Those scores were then multiplied by the factor shown on the chart below; the results were added together to generate a total Program Component Score.

Program component factoring
| Discipline | Short program or Rhythm dance | Free skate or Free dance |
|---|---|---|
| Men | 1.00 | 2.00 |
| Women | 0.80 | 1.60 |
| Pairs | 0.80 | 1.60 |
| Ice dance | 0.80 | 1.20 |

Deductions were applied for certain violations, such as time infractions or falls. The Total Elements Score and Program Component Score were then added together, minus any deductions, to generate a final performance score for each skater or team.

== Medal summary ==
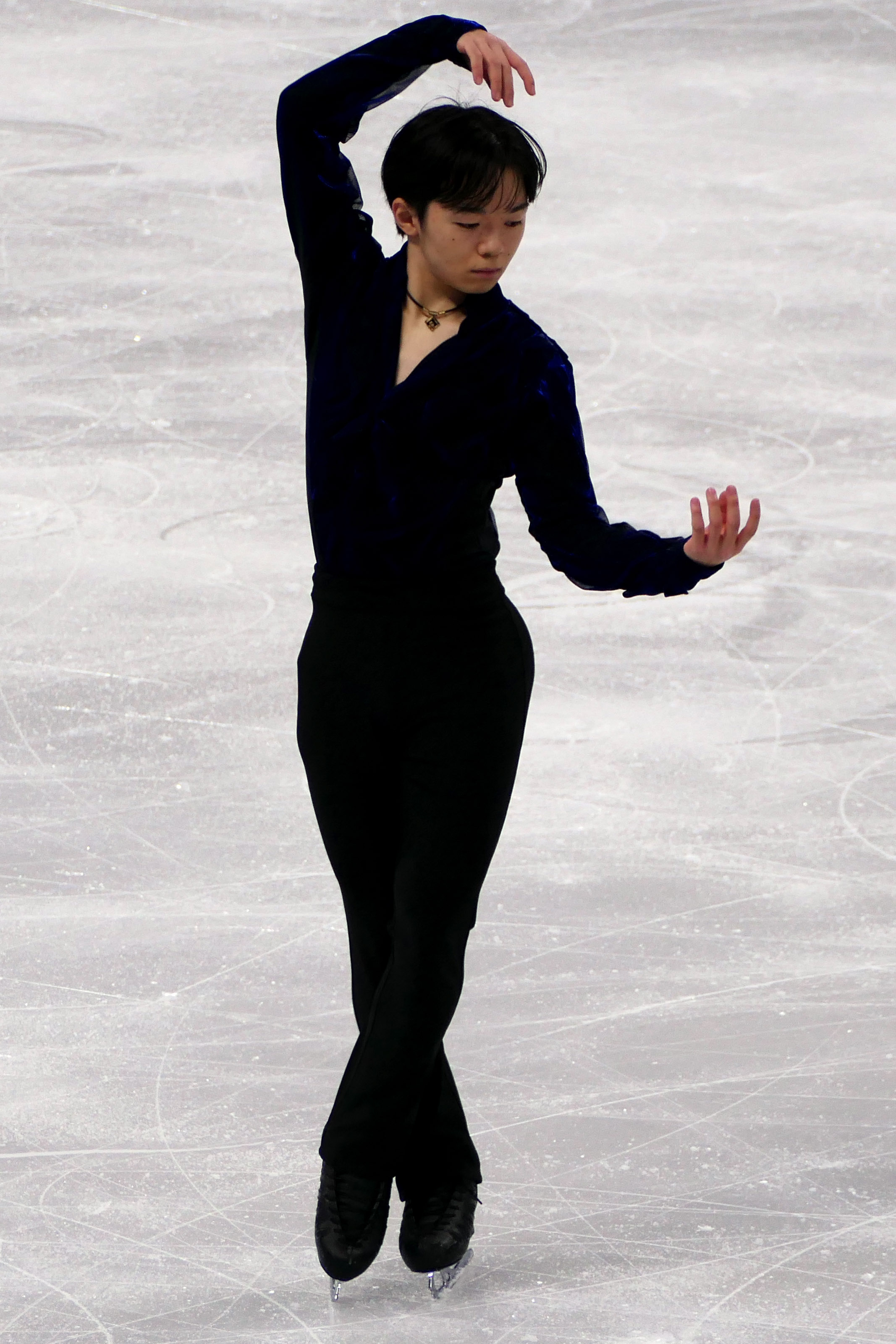
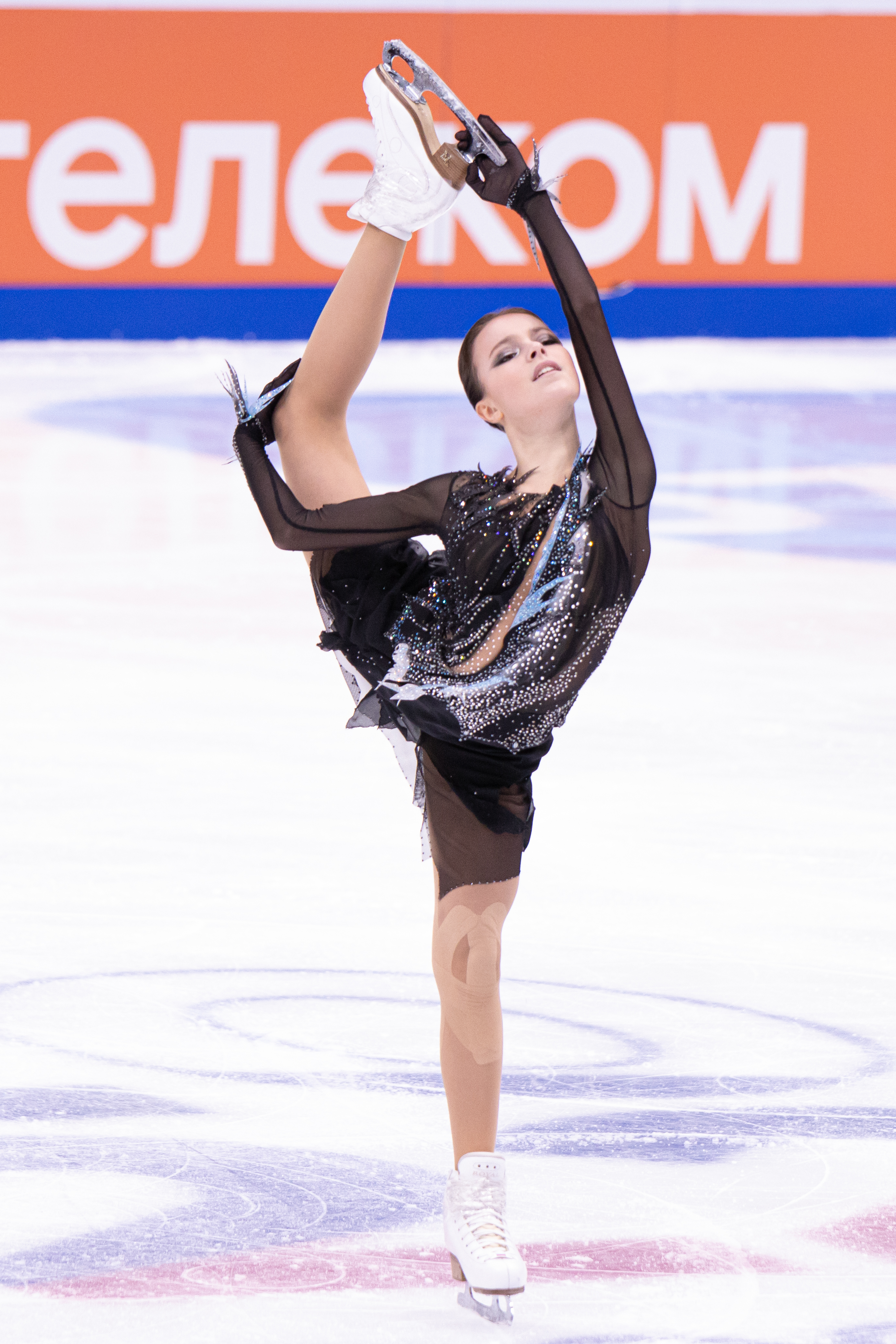
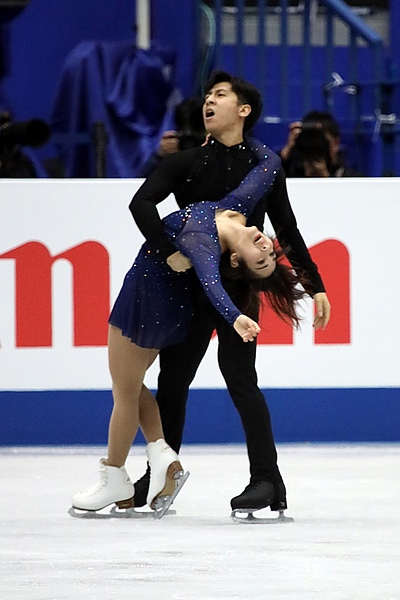
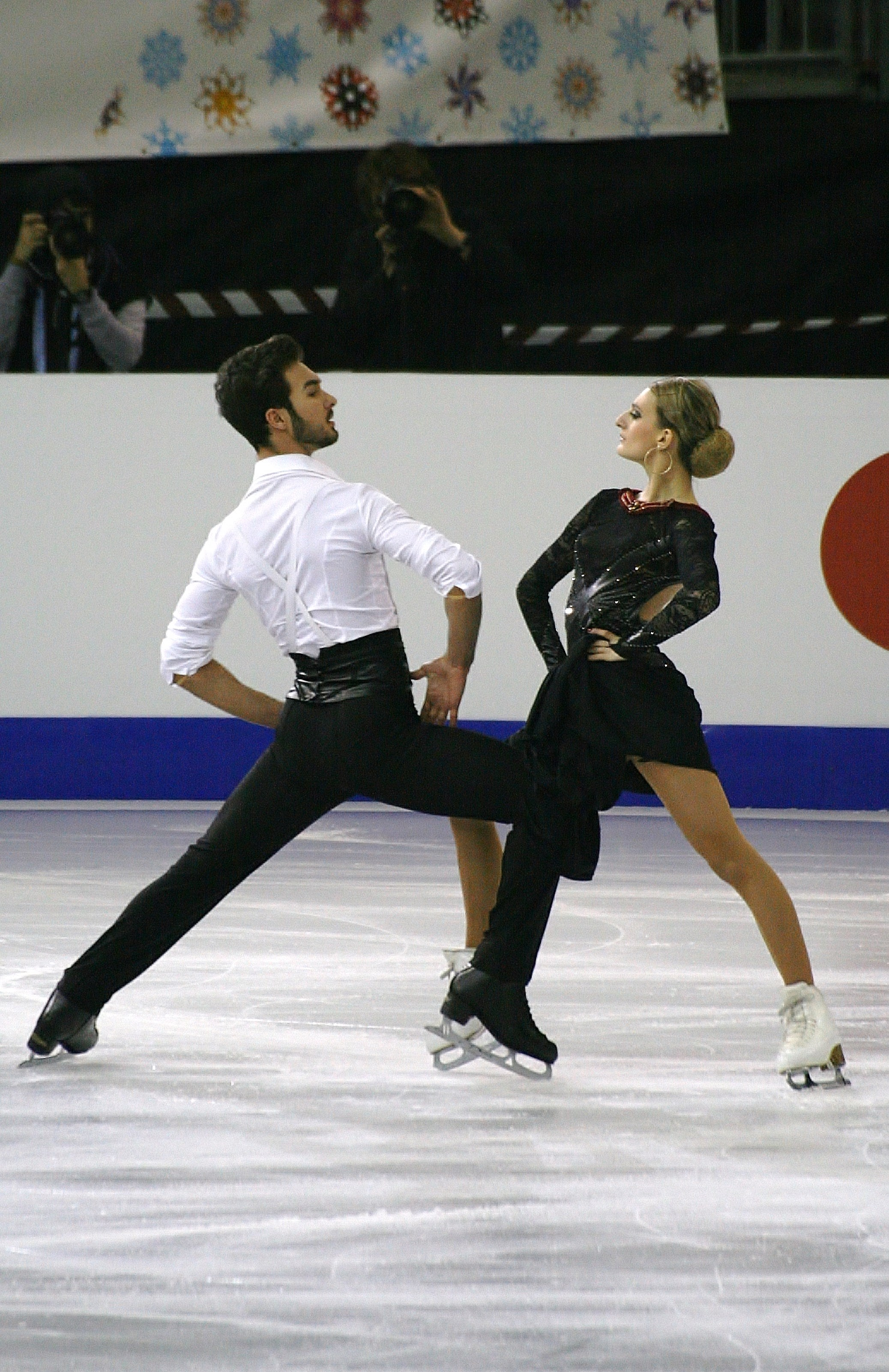
The 2021 Gran Premio d'Italia champions (from left to right): Yuma Kagiyama of Japan (men's singles); Anna Shcherbakova of Russia (women's singles); Sui Wenjing and Han Cong of China (pair skating); and Gabriella Papadakis and Guillaume Cizeron of France (ice dance)

Medalists
| Discipline | Gold | Silver | Bronze |
|---|---|---|---|
| Men | (Japan); Yuma Kagiyama | (Russia); Mikhail Kolyada | (Italy); Daniel Grassl |
| Women | (Russia); Anna Shcherbakova | (Russia); Maiia Khromykh | (Belgium); Loena Hendrickx |
| Pairs | (China); Sui Wenjing; Han Cong | (China); Peng Cheng; Jin Yang | (Russia); Iuliia Artemeva; Mikhail Nazarychev |
| Ice dance | (France); Gabriella Papadakis; Guillaume Cizeron | (United States); Madison Hubbell; Zachary Donohue | (Russia); Alexandra Stepanova; Ivan Bukin |

== Results ==
=== Men's singles ===
Men's results
| Rank | Skater | Nation | Total | SP | | FS | |
|---|---|---|---|---|---|---|---|
| 1st place, gold medalist(s) | Yuma Kagiyama | Japan | 278.02 | 7 | 80.53 | 1 | 197.49 |
| 2nd place, silver medalist(s) | Mikhail Kolyada | Russia | 273.55 | 4 | 92.30 | 2 | 181.25 |
| 3rd place, bronze medalist(s) | Daniel Grassl | Italy | 269.00 | 2 | 95.67 | 3 | 173.33 |
| 4 | Deniss Vasiļjevs | Latvia | 248.44 | 5 | 85.09 | 4 | 163.35 |
| 5 | Cha Jun-hwan | South Korea | 247.74 | 3 | 95.56 | 6 | 152.18 |
| 6 | Kazuki Tomono | Japan | 245.11 | 6 | 83.91 | 5 | 161.20 |
| 7 | Jin Boyang | China | 242.27 | 1 | 97.89 | 9 | 144.38 |
| 8 | Petr Gumennik | Russia | 226.76 | 9 | 76.81 | 7 | 149.95 |
| 9 | Dmitri Aliev | Russia | 217.67 | 10 | 71.07 | 8 | 146.60 |
| 10 | Chen Yudong | China | 200.96 | 8 | 78.79 | 10 | 122.17 |
| 11 | Gabriele Frangipani | Italy | 167.60 | 12 | 55.09 | 11 | 112.51 |
| WD | Paul Fentz | Germany | Withdrew | 11 | 57.17 | Withdrew from competition | |

=== Women's singles ===
Loena Hendrickx's bronze medal was the first ISU Grand Prix medal for a Belgian skater in the women's individual event.

Women's results
| Rank | Skater | Nation | Total | SP | | FS | |
|---|---|---|---|---|---|---|---|
| 1st place, gold medalist(s) | Anna Shcherbakova | Russia | 236.78 | 3 | 71.73 | 1 | 165.05 |
| 2nd place, silver medalist(s) | Maiia Khromykh | Russia | 226.35 | 2 | 72.04 | 2 | 154.31 |
| 3rd place, bronze medalist(s) | Loena Hendrickx | Belgium | 219.05 | 1 | 73.52 | 3 | 145.53 |
| 4 | Mai Mihara | Japan | 214.95 | 5 | 70.46 | 4 | 144.49 |
| 5 | Satoko Miyahara | Japan | 209.57 | 4 | 70.85 | 5 | 138.72 |
| 6 | Kim Ye-lim | South Korea | 193.50 | 7 | 62.78 | 6 | 130.72 |
| 7 | Sofia Samodurova | Russia | 180.59 | 9 | 58.68 | 7 | 121.91 |
| 8 | Lim Eun-soo | South Korea | 179.58 | 6 | 67.03 | 8 | 112.55 |
| 9 | Zhu Yi | China | 171.25 | 8 | 60.00 | 9 | 111.25 |
| 10 | Nicole Schott | Germany | 167.20 | 10 | 58.33 | 10 | 108.87 |
| 11 | Lara Naki Gutmann | Italy | 158.57 | 11 | 54.83 | 11 | 103.74 |
| 12 | Lucrezia Beccari | Italy | 148.29 | 12 | 53.35 | 12 | 94.94 |

=== Pairs ===
Pairs results
| Rank | Team | Nation | Total | SP | | FS | |
|---|---|---|---|---|---|---|---|
| 1st place, gold medalist(s) | Sui Wenjing; Han Cong | China | 224.55 | 1 | 80.07 | 1 | 144.48 |
| 2nd place, silver medalist(s) | Peng Cheng; Jin Yang | China | 211.86 | 2 | 76.71 | 2 | 135.15 |
| 3rd place, bronze medalist(s) | Iuliia Artemeva; Mikhail Nazarychev | Russia | 187.01 | 4 | 61.90 | 3 | 125.11 |
| 4 | Nicole Della Monica; Matteo Guarise | Italy | 179.26 | 3 | 65.12 | 4 | 114.14 |
| 5 | Rebecca Ghilardi; Filippo Ambrosini | Italy | 165.45 | 5 | 60.89 | 6 | 104.56 |
| 6 | Alina Pepeleva; Roman Pleshkov | Russia | 162.71 | 7 | 52.72 | 5 | 109.99 |
| 7 | Sara Conti; Niccolò Macii | Italy | 152.72 | 6 | 54.55 | 7 | 98.17 |
| WD | Annika Hocke; Robert Kunkel | Germany | Withdrew | 8 | 49.16 | Withdrew from competition | |

=== Ice dance ===
After missing the entire 2020–21 season, the Gran Premio d'Italia was the first Grand Prix event for Gabriella Papadakis and Guillaume Cizeron of France since 2019.

Ice dance results
| Rank | Team | Nation | Total | RD | | FD | |
|---|---|---|---|---|---|---|---|
| 1st place, gold medalist(s) | Gabriella Papadakis; Guillaume Cizeron | France | 220.06 | 1 | 87.45 | 1 | 132.61 |
| 2nd place, silver medalist(s) | Madison Hubbell; Zachary Donohue | United States | 207.90 | 2 | 84.79 | 2 | 123.11 |
| 3rd place, bronze medalist(s) | Alexandra Stepanova; Ivan Bukin | Russia | 202.18 | 3 | 81.47 | 3 | 120.71 |
| 4 | Wang Shiyue; Liu Xinyu | China | 184.59 | 5 | 73.28 | 4 | 111.31 |
| 5 | Caroline Green; Michael Parsons | United States | 178.26 | 4 | 75.60 | 6 | 102.66 |
| 6 | Evgeniia Lopareva; Geoffrey Brissaud | France | 174.63 | 6 | 67.31 | 5 | 107.32 |
| 7 | Carolane Soucisse; Shane Firus | Canada | 163.86 | 8 | 63.40 | 7 | 100.46 |
| 8 | Katharina Müller; Tim Dieck | Germany | 159.97 | 7 | 63.41 | 9 | 95.56 |
| 9 | Chen Hong; Sun Zhuoming | China | 158.12 | 9 | 62.37 | 8 | 95.75 |
| 10 | Carolina Moscheni; Francesco Fioretti | Italy | 140.83 | 10 | 55.79 | 10 | 85.04 |

== Works cited ==
- "Special Regulations & Technical Rules – Single & Pair Skating and Ice Dance 2021". International Skating Union. Archived from the original on 4 April 2022.
