= 2018 Canadian Figure Skating Championships =

Figure skating competition

2018 Canadian Skating Championships
- Type: National Championship
- Date: January 8 – 14
- Season: 2017–18
- Location: Vancouver, British Columbia
- Host: Skate Canada
- Venue: Doug Mitchell Thunderbird Sports Centre

Champions
- Men's singles: Patrick Chan (S); Matthew Markell (J)
- Ladies' singles: Gabrielle Daleman (S); Olivia Gran (J)
- Pairs: Meagan Duhamel and Eric Radford (S); Lori-Ann Matte and Thierry Ferland (J)
- Ice dance: Tessa Virtue and Scott Moir (S); Marjorie Lajoie and Zachary Lagha (J)
- Previous: 2017 Canadian Championships
- Next: 2019 Canadian Championships

The 2018 Canadian Figure Skating Championships took place from January 8–14, 2018, at the Doug Mitchell Thunderbird Sports Centre in Vancouver, British Columbia. Medals were awarded in men's singles, women's singles, pair skating, and ice dance on the senior, junior, and novice levels. The results of this competition were part of the Canadian selection criteria for the 2018 Winter Olympics, the 2018 World Championships, the 2018 Four Continents Championships, and the 2018 World Junior Championships.

Vancouver was named as the host in January 2017. Competitors qualified at the Skate Canada Challenge held in Pierrefonds, Quebec, in December 2017.

== Medal summary ==
=== Senior results ===
Discipline	Gold	Silver	Bronze
Men	Patrick Chan	Keegan Messing	Nam Nguyen
Women	Gabrielle Daleman	Kaetlyn Osmond	Larkyn Austman
Pairs	Meagan Duhamel; Eric Radford	Julianne Séguin; Charlie Bilodeau	Kirsten Moore-Towers; Michael Marinaro
Ice dance	Tessa Virtue; Scott Moir	Piper Gilles; Paul Poirier	Kaitlyn Weaver; Andrew Poje

=== Junior results ===
Discipline	Gold	Silver	Bronze
Men	Matthew Markell	Corey Circelli	Zoé Duval-Yergeau
Women	Olivia Gran	Sarah-Maude Blanchard	Victoria Bocknek
Pairs	Lori-Ann Matte; Thierry Ferland	Patricia Andrew; Paxton Knott	Gabrielle Levesque; Pier-Alexandre Hudon
Ice dance	Marjorie Lajoie; Zachary Lagha	Olivia McIsaac; Elliott Graham	Ashlynne Stairs; Lee Royer

== Senior results ==
=== Men's singles ===
Men's results
Rank	Skater	Total	SP		FS	
1st place, gold medalist(s)	Patrick Chan	272.24	1	90.98	1	181.26
2nd place, silver medalist(s)	Keegan Messing	259.25	3	85.65	3	173.60
3rd place, bronze medalist(s)	Nam Nguyen	258.16	5	83.39	2	174.77
4	Elladj Baldé	250.28	4	84.91	4	165.37
5	Kevin Reynolds	249.30	2	86.20	6	163.10
6	Joseph Phan	241.71	8	78.01	5	163.70
7	Roman Sadovsky	233.67	7	78.72	8	154.95
8	Liam Firus	232.49	9	77.44	7	155.05
9	Nicolas Nadeau	227.51	6	79.56	10	147.95
10	Stephen Gogolev	220.81	11	72.61	9	148.20
11	Conrad Orzel	207.66	10	73.69	11	133.97
12	Bennet Toman	198.91	13	68.83	12	130.08
13	Samuel Angers	191.64	12	69.96	13	121.68
14	Eric Liu	185.01	14	64.82	14	120.19
15	Olivier Bergeron	180.92	15	63.61	16	117.31
16	Jérémie Crevaux	177.75	16	60.32	15	117.43
17	Dustin Sherriff-Clayton	166.00	17	57.95	17	108.05
18	Edrian Paul Celestino	153.71	18	56.14	18	97.57

=== Women's singles ===
Women's results
Rank	Skater	Total	SP		FS	
1st place, gold medalist(s)	Gabrielle Daleman	229.78	1	77.88	1	151.90
2nd place, silver medalist(s)	Kaetlyn Osmond	218.73	2	71.41	2	147.32
3rd place, bronze medalist(s)	Larkyn Austman	169.62	6	53.96	3	115.66
4	Alaine Chartrand	164.21	9	52.19	4	112.02
5	Aurora Cotop	156.89	14	48.83	5	108.06
6	Kim Deguise-Léveillé	154.41	11	49.70	6	104.71
7	Michelle Long	153.46	4	54.11	8	99.35
8	Alicia Pineault	152.21	12	49.43	7	102.78
9	Sarah Tamura	150.39	3	54.34	9	96.05
10	Sophie Larouche	144.09	7	52.87	11	91.22
11	Kelsey Wong	142.90	13	48.95	10	93.95
12	Emy Decelles	139.55	15	48.55	12	91.00
13	Amanda Tobin	139.54	10	51.95	14	87.59
14	Jane Gray	137.11	16	46.51	13	90.60
15	Triena Robinson	136.91	5	53.96	17	82.95
16	Aislinn Ganci	136.52	8	52.77	15	83.75
17	Hélène Carle	123.17	17	39.90	16	83.27
18	Maysie Poliziani	118.77	18	39.85	18	78.92

=== Pairs ===
Pairs' results
Rank	Team	Total	SP		FS	
1st place, gold medalist(s)	Meagan Duhamel; Eric Radford	234.55	1	81.78	1	152.77
2nd place, silver medalist(s)	Julianne Séguin; Charlie Bilodeau	213.00	2	68.51	2	144.49
3rd place, bronze medalist(s)	Kirsten Moore-Towers; Michael Marinaro	209.85	3	68.28	3	141.57
4	Liubov Ilyushechkina; Dylan Moscovitch	190.53	4	65.45	4	125.08
5	Evelyn Walsh; Trennt Michaud	182.87	5	62.61	5	120.26
6	Camille Ruest; Andrew Wolfe	177.54	6	60.18	6	117.36
7	Sydney Kolodziej; Maxime Deschamps	171.20	7	56.42	7	114.78

=== Ice dance ===
Ice dance results
Rank	Team	Total	SD		FD	
1st place, gold medalist(s)	Tessa Virtue; Scott Moir	209.82	1	85.12	1	124.70
2nd place, silver medalist(s)	Piper Gilles; Paul Poirier	192.08	2	78.37	3	113.71
3rd place, bronze medalist(s)	Kaitlyn Weaver; Andrew Poje	191.09	4	70.31	2	120.78
4	Carolane Soucisse; Shane Firus	180.73	3	70.97	4	109.76
5	Sarah Arnold; Thomas Williams	158.53	6	60.18	5	98.35
6	Haley Sales; Nikolas Wamsteeker	154.74	5	63.84	6	90.90
7	Molly Lanaghan; Dmitre Razgulajevs	146.22	7	57.38	7	88.84
8	Gina Cipriano; Jake Richardson	126.89	8	51.19	8	75.70
9	Ravie Cunningham; Cedar Bridgewood	122.78	9	47.36	9	75.42
10	Vanessa Chartrand; Alexander Seidel	111.31	10	42.38	10	68.93

== Junior results ==
=== Men ===
Rank	Name	Total points	SP		FS	
1	Matthew Markell	181.41	4	54.53	1	126.88
2	Corey Circelli	176.66	2	59.64	3	117.02
3	Zoé Duval-Yergeau	170.58	1	59.97	4	110.61
4	Iliya Kovler	169.80	11	50.10	2	119.70
5	Brian Le	162.34	6	54.33	5	108.01
6	Jack Dushenski	159.46	8	51.90	6	107.56
7	Bruce Waddell	156.48	3	57.32	9	99.16
8	Max Denk	150.65	15	46.77	7	103.88
9	Dawson Nodwell	148.38	10	50.91	10	97.47
10	Graham Schaufele	145.65	7	53.06	11	92.59
11	Koen Kucher	145.14	16	45.34	8	99.80
12	Samuel Turcotte	144.61	5	54.48	14	90.13
13	Justin Hampole	142.12	12	49.70	12	92.42
14	David Birinberg	140.76	13	48.40	13	92.36
15	Loucas Ethier	130.97	17	44.35	16	86.62
16	Ehren Chang	130.01	9	51.03	17	78.98
17	Alexandre Simard	126.59	18	39.24	15	87.35
18	James Henri-Singh	119.72	14	48.15	18	71.57

=== Women ===
Rank	Name	Total points	SP		FS	
1	Olivia Gran	149.65	2	54.96	1	94.69
2	Sarah-Maude Blanchard	148.52	1	58.24	2	90.28
3	Victoria Bocknek	138.89	4	50.31	4	88.58
4	Béatrice Lavoie-Léonard	136.91	5	48.27	3	88.64
5	Alison Schumacher	131.95	3	52.39	12	79.56
6	Emma Bulawka	131.93	8	45.50	5	86.43
7	Justine Brasseur	127.87	6	46.77	8	81.10
8	Vasilisa Matantseva	127.23	14	41.30	6	85.93
9	Elodie Adsuar	125.50	10	44.70	9	80.80
10	Rosalie Vincent	124.94	9	45.21	11	79.73
11	Catherine Carle	123.83	15	40.74	7	83.09
12	Olivia Farrow	123.47	12	43.34	10	80.13
13	Lissa Anne McGaghey	121.43	11	44.32	13	77.11
14	Evelyn Walsh	115.85	7	45.92	16	69.93
15	Hannah Dawson	114.98	16	40.41	15	74.57
16	Lilika Zheng	111.55	18	35.17	14	76.38
17	Jolie Chiem	107.36	13	41.72	17	65.64
18	Julia LaBella	99.95	17	38.68	18	61.27

=== Pairs ===
Rank	Name	Total points	SP		FS	
1	Lori-Ann Matte / Thierry Ferland	139.87	1	53.48	1	86.39
2	Patricia Andrew / Paxton Knott	131.27	5	46.61	2	84.66
3	Gabrielle Levesque / Pier-Alexander Hudon	130.94	4	47.76	3	83.18
4	Mariah McCaw / Steven Adcock	130.58	3	47.97	4	82.61
5	Chloe Choinard / Mathieu Ostiguy	126.18	6	45.25	5	80.93
6	Chloe Panetta / Steven Lapointe	123.12	2	47.99	7	75.13
7	Isabella Mancini / Christian Reekie	114.24	8	37.93	6	76.31
8	Alison Schumacher / Zachary Daleman	113.86	7	41.44	8	72.42
9	Katherina Frantz / Nicolas Frantz	100.26	9	34.51	9	65.75

=== Ice dance ===
Rank	Name	Total points	SD		FD	
1	Marjorie Lajoie / Zachary Lagha	154.40	1	65.02	1	89.38
2	Olivia McIsaac / Elliott Graham	137.56	2	57.91	4	79.65
3	Ashlynne Stairs / Lee Royer	134.51	8	52.74	2	81.77
4	Ellie Fisher / Simon-Pierre Malette-Paquette	134.19	7	52.86	3	81.33
5	Irina Galiyanova / Tommy Tang	132.01	3	55.13	5	76.88
6	Valerie Taillefer / Jason Chan	130.84	4	54.59	6	76.25
7	Alicia Fabbri / Claudio Pietrantonio	127.11	5	53.76	7	73.35
8	Natalie D'Alessandro / Bruce Waddell	123.83	9	50.99	8	72.84
9	Olivia Han / Grayson Lochhead	119.77	6	52.96	10	66.81
10	Katrine Roy / Oliver Zhang	108.62	14	41.73	9	66.89
11	Kaitlyn Chubb / Alew Gunther	104.02	12	45.86	13	58.16
12	Keelee Gingrich / Parker Brown	103.84	11	46.40	14	57.44
13	Katerina Kasatkin / Corey Circelli	102.46	13	42.75	11	59.71
14	Jade McCue / Gabriel Clemente	99.77	15	41.45	12	58.32
WD	Nina Mizuki / Veniamins Volskis		10	48.39	withdrew from competition	

== International team selections ==
=== Winter Olympics ===
The team for the 2018 Winter Olympics was announced on January 14, 2018.

No.	Men	Women	Pairs	Ice dance
1	Patrick Chan	Gabrielle Daleman	Meagan Duhamel; Eric Radford	Tessa Virtue; Scott Moir
2	Keegan Messing	Kaetlyn Osmond	Julianne Séguin; Charlie Bilodeau	Piper Gilles; Paul Poirier
3	—	Larkyn Austman	Kirsten Moore-Towers; Michael Marinaro	Kaitlyn Weaver; Andrew Poje

=== World Championships ===
The team for the 2018 World Championships was announced on January 14, 2018.

No.	Men	Women	Pairs	Ice dance
1	Patrick Chan	Larkyn Austman	Meagan Duhamel; Eric Radford	Tessa Virtue; Scott Moir
2	Keegan Messing	Gabrielle Daleman	Kirsten Moore-Towers; Michael Marinaro	Piper Gilles; Paul Poirier
3	—	Kaetlyn Osmond	Julianne Séguin; Charlie Bilodeau	Kaitlyn Weaver; Andrew Poje

Alternates

No.	Men	Women	Pairs	Ice dance
1	Nam Nguyen	Alaine Chartrand	Lubov Ilyushechkina; Dylan Moscovitch	Carolane Soucisse; Shane Firus
2	Elladj Baldé	Michelle Long	Camille Ruest; Drew Wolfe	Sarah Arnold; Thomas Williams
3	Kevin Reynolds	Alicia Pineault	Sydney Kolodziej; Maxime Deschamps	Haley Sales; Nikolas Wamsteeker

=== Four Continents Championships ===
The team for the 2018 Four Continents Championships was announced on January 14, 2018.

No.	Men	Women	Pairs	Ice dance
1	Elladj Baldé	Alaine Chartrand	Lubov Ilyushechkina; Dylan Moscovitch	Carolane Soucisse; Shane Firus
2	Nam Nguyen	Michelle Long	Camille Ruest; Drew Wolfe	Sarah Arnold; Thomas Williams
3	Kevin Reynolds	Alicia Pineault	Sydney Kolodziej; Maxime Deschamps	Haley Sales; Nikolas Wamsteeker

Alternates

No.	Men	Women	Pairs	Ice dance
1	Roman Sadovsky	Sarah Tamura	Molly Lanaghan; Dmitre Razgulajevs	—
2	Liam Firus	Emy Decelles	—	—
3	Nicolas Nadeau	—	—	—

=== World Junior Championships ===
The team for the 2018 World Junior Championships was announced on January 14, 2018.

No.	Men	Women	Pairs	Ice dance
1	Conrad Orzel	Aurora Cotop	Lori-Ann Matte; Thierry Ferland	Marjorie Lajoie; Zachary Lagha
2	Joseph Phan	—	Evelyn Walsh; Trennt Michaud	Olivia McIsaac; Elliott Graham

Alternates

No.	Men	Women	Pairs	Ice dance
1	Corey Circelli	Alison Schumacher	Gabreille Levesque; Pier-Alexandre Hudon	Ashlynne Stairs; Lee Royer
2	Eric Liu	Olivia Gran	Chloe Choinard; Mathieu Ostiguy	Ellie Fisher; Simon-Pierre Malette-Paquette
3	—		Chloé Panetta; Steven Lapointe	—
