= Olivia McIsaac =

Canadian ice dancer

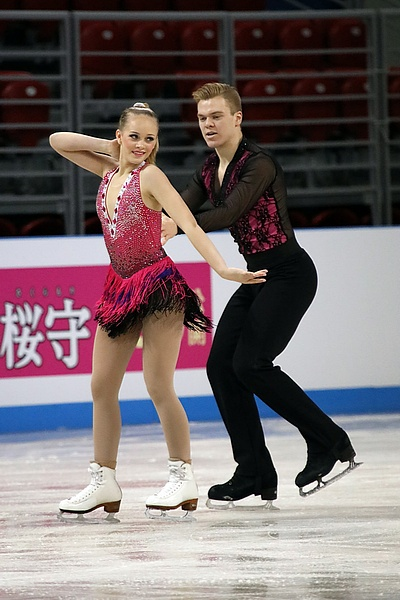
- McIsaac/Graham at the 2018 World Junior Championships

Personal information
- Born: October 30, 2001 (age 24) Oakville, Ontario, Canada
- Home town: Burlington, Ontario
- Height: 1.62 m (5 ft 4 in)

Figure skating career
- Country: Canada
- Skating club: Burlington SC
- Began skating: 2005
- Retired: May 16, 2020

Olivia McIsaac (born October 30, 2001) is a Canadian former competitive ice dancer. With her former skating partner, Corey Circelli, she is the 2020 Canadian national junior bronze medalist. With her former skating partner, Elliott Graham, she is the 2018 Canadian national junior silver medalist and finished in the top 12 at the 2018 World Junior Championships.

== Personal life ==
McIsaac was born on October 30, 2001, in Oakville, Ontario. Her mother, Clare Kelly McIsaac, was a competitive figure skater at the senior level internationally for Canada. McIsaac has a younger sister named Rachel. She looks up to fellow Canadian ice dancers Marjorie Lajoie / Zachary Lagha. McIsaac competed in gymnastics when she was young. She is currently a student at Queen's University at Kingston.

== Career ==
=== Early career ===
McIsaac began skating in 2005, after her mother put her on the ice as a toddler. She trained in ladies' singles with her mother and Shelley Barnett as her coaches. McIsaac began competing simultaneously in ice dance after teaming up with Scott Norton during the 2015–16 season to compete on the intermediate level. She competed with Liam MacDonald the following season, finishing 11th at the novice level at the 2017 Canadian Championships.

=== 2017–2018 season ===
McIsaac quit singles in 2017 to focus on training ice dance full-time. She teamed up with Elliott Graham and moved to train with his coaches at the Mariposa School of Skating in Barrie, Ontario. McIsaac/Graham made their junior international debut at 2017 JGP Poland, where they finished fourth. They then won Sectionals and medaled at Skate Canada Challenge to qualify to the 2018 Canadian Championships. At Canadian Championships, McIsaac/Graham won the silver medal behind Marjorie Lajoie / Zachary Lagha and were named to the team for Junior Worlds in their first season as a team.

At the 2018 World Junior Championships, McIsaac/Graham finished 12th in the short dance and 14th in the free dance to finish 12th overall. Graham ended the partnership at the end of the season.

=== 2018–2019 season ===
In 2018, McIsaac teamed up with Corey Circelli and relocated to the Toronto Cricket, Skating and Curling Club, where he trained in singles alongside ice dance. They made their international debut at 2018 JGP Czech Republic, where they finished seventh. At the 2019 Canadian Championships, McIsaac/Graham finished eighth.

=== 2019–2020 season ===
McIsaac/Circelli were assigned to 2019 JGP France and 2019 JGP Italy, where they finished ninth and 12th, respectively. They earned their first national medal at the 2020 Canadian Championships, winning the junior bronze behind Emmy Bronsard / Aissa Bouaraguia and Nadiia Bashynska / Peter Beaumont.

On May 16, 2020, McIsaac announced her retirement from the sport.

== Programs ==
=== With Circelli ===
Season	Rhythm dance	Free dance
2019–2020	Quickstep: Overture; Foxtrot: I'd Rather Be Blue; Quickstep: Don't Rain on My Parade (from Funny Girl) by Jule Styne performed by Barbra Streisand choreo. by Kelly Johnson	Nature Boy by eden ahbez; Danse Macabre (from The History of Eternity) by Zbigniew Preisner; Danse Macabre by Camille Saint-Saëns choreo. by Romain Haguenauer
2018–2019	Foxtrot: Overture; Foxtrot: All That Jazz; Tango: Cell Block Tango (from Chicago) by Fred Ebb, John Kander choreo. by Kelly Johnson	There Will Be Time by Mumford & Sons, Baaba Maal choreo. by Romain Haguenauer

=== With Graham ===
Season	Short dance	Free dance
2017–2018	Rhumba: Quizás, Quizás, Quizás by Osvaldo Farrés performed by Pink Martini; Cha cha: Angelina by Dámaso Pérez Prado performed by Lou Bega choreo. by Kelly Johnson	Let It Be Me by Ray LaMontagne; What I Wouldn't Do by Serena Ryder choreo. by Shae Zukiwsky

== Competitive highlights ==
- JGP – Event of the ISU Junior Grand Prix Series

=== Ice dance with Corey Circelli ===
Competition placements at junior level
Season	2018–19	2019–20
Canadian Championships	8th	3rd
JGP Czech Republic	7th	
JGP France		9th
JGP Italy		12th
Skate Canada Challenge	9th	6th

=== With Graham ===
International: Junior
Event	2017–18
Junior Worlds	12th
JGP Poland	4th
National
Canadian Champ.	2nd J
Levels: J = Junior

== Detailed results ==
ISU personal bests highlighted in bold.

=== With Circelli ===
2019–20 season
Date	Event	RD	FD	Total
January 13–19, 2020	2020 Canadian Championships	4; 56.92	3; 89.81	3; 146.73
October 2–5, 2019	2019 JGP Italy	10; 51.38	13; 74.65	12; 126.03
August 21–24, 2019	2019 JGP France	10; 50.36	8; **83.42**	9; 133.78
2018–19 season
Date	Event	RD	FD	Total
January 14–20, 2018	2019 Canadian Championships	9; 54.43	7; 87.88	8; 142.31
September 26–29, 2018	2018 JGP Czech Republic	7; **52.86**	7; 81.33	7; **134.19**

=== With Graham ===
2017–18 season
Date	Event	SD	FD	Total
March 5–11, 2018	2018 World Junior Championships	12; 52.80	14; 68.37	12; 121.17
January 8–14, 2018	2018 Canadian Championships	2; 57.91	4; 79.65	2; 137.56
October 4–7, 2017	2017 JGP Poland	5; **53.44**	6; **68.96**	4; **122.40**
