= 2022 Four Continents Figure Skating Championships =

2022 Four Continents Championships
- Type: ISU Championship
- Date: January 18 – 23
- Season: 2021–22
- Location: Tallinn, Estonia
- Host: Estonian Skating Union
- Venue: Tondiraba Ice Hall

Champions
- Men's singles: (South Korea) Cha Jun-hwan
- Women's singles: (Japan) Mai Mihara
- Pairs: (United States) Audrey Lu / Misha Mitrofanov
- Ice dance: (United States) Caroline Green / Michael Parsons
- Previous: 2020 Four Continents Championships
- Next: 2023 Four Continents Championships

The 2022 Four Continents Figure Skating Championships were held from January 18–23, 2022, at the Tondiraba Ice Hall in Tallinn, Estonia. Held annually since 1999 (except for 2021 due to the COVID-19 pandemic), the competition featured skaters from the Americas, Asia, Africa, and Oceania. Medals were awarded in men's singles, women's singles, pair skating, and ice dance.

Tianjin, China was announced as the original host in October 2020. The 2022 Four Continents Championships were one of several events cancelled by the Chinese Skating Association during the COVID-19 pandemic. Upon China's withdrawal as host on September 13, 2021, the International Skating Union asked for other non-European ISU members to apply as alternative hosts, with any relocation decision to be determined at the ISU Council meeting on October 1. However, as no other qualified members chose to apply, the ISU asked the Estonian Skating Union, the host of the 2022 European Championships, to host the Four Continents Championships, resulting in a event held for the first time outside a member country.

== Impact of the COVID-19 pandemic ==
During the 2020–21 season, the Chinese Skating Association had already cancelled several events due to the country's stringent quarantine requirements – 21 days in isolation for non-residents – and limited flights in and out of the country. Among the cancelled events were the 2021 World Junior Championships and the 2020–21 Grand Prix Final. Less than a month prior to the cancellation of the Four Continents Championships, the CSA cancelled the 2021 Cup of China. Again citing "the complicated epidemic situation," the CSA and the Tianjin Municipal Government informed the ISU of the cancellation of Four Continents on September 13, 2021.

The Four Continents Championships would have been the first ISU Championship event during the 2021–22 season to be cancelled, before being relocated to Tallinn. The ISU and various host federations had already cancelled or relocated several other events earlier in the season, including events on the Junior Grand Prix, Grand Prix, and Challenger Series. After the ISU was able to find a replacement host for the Cup of China, it again asked non-European ISU members to consider applying to host the Four Continents Championships on the originally scheduled dates. After an unsuccessful search, Tallinn was chosen as the replacement host, having just hosted the 2022 European Championships one week prior.

Due to the proximity of the Four Continents Championships, both in terms of geography and time, to the 2022 Winter Olympics in Beijing, China's decision to cancel the event prompted further concerns about whether the Winter Olympics would be able to proceed as scheduled, and if so, be conducted in a safe manner.

== Qualification ==
=== Age and minimum TES requirements ===
The competition was open to skaters from all non-European member nations of the International Skating Union. The corresponding competition for European skaters was the 2022 European Championships.

Skaters were eligible for the 2022 Four Continents Championships if they turned 15 years of age before July 1, 2021, and met the minimum technical elements score requirements. The ISU accepts scores if they were obtained at senior-level ISU-recognized international competitions during the ongoing season at least 21 days before the first official practice day of the championships or during the two preceding seasons.

Discipline	SP / RD	FS / FD
Men	28	46
Women	23	40
Pairs	25	42
Ice dance	28	44

- SP/RD and FS/FD scores may be attained at different events.

=== Number of entries per discipline ===
Each qualifying ISU member nation could enter up to three skaters or teams per discipline.

== Entries ==
Member nations began announcing their selections in December 2021. The International Skating Union published a complete list of entries on December 29, 2021.

Country	Men	Women	Pairs	Ice dance
Australia	Jordan Dodds; Brendan Kerry; James Min	Victoria Alcantara; Kailani Craine		Holly Harris / Jason Chan; India Nette / Eron Westwood
Canada	Corey Circelli; Joseph Phan	Gabrielle Daleman; Véronik Mallet; Alison Schumacher	Lori-Ann Matte / Thierry Ferland; Deanna Stellato-Dudek / Maxime Deschamps; Evelyn Walsh / Trennt Michaud	Marie-Jade Lauriault / Romain Le Gac; Haley Sales / Nikolas Wamsteeker; Carolane Soucisse / Shane Firus
Chinese Taipei		Ting Tzu-Han		
Hong Kong	Harrison Jon-Yen Wong			
India		Tara Prasad		
Japan	Kao Miura; Sena Miyake; Kazuki Tomono	Rino Matsuike; Mai Mihara; Yuhana Yokoi		Kana Muramoto / Daisuke Takahashi
Kazakhstan	Dias Jirenbayev; Mikhail Shaidorov			
Mexico		Eugenia Garza; Andrea Montesinos Cantú		
New Zealand		Jocelyn Hong		Charlotte Lafond-Fournier / Richard Kang-in Kam
Philippines		Sofia Lexi Jacqueline Frank		
South Korea	Cha Jun-hwan; Kyeong Jae-seok; Lee Si-hyeong	Kim Ye-lim; Lee Hae-in; You Young		
United States	Tomoki Hiwatashi; Jimmy Ma; Camden Pulkinen	Starr Andrews; Gabriella Izzo; Audrey Shin	Emily Chan / Spencer Akira Howe; Audrey Lu / Misha Mitrofanov; Katie McBeath / Nathan Bartholomay	Emily Bratti / Ian Somerville; Christina Carreira / Anthony Ponomarenko; Caroline Green / Michael Parsons

=== Changes to preliminary assignments ===
Date	Discipline	Withdrew	Added	Notes	Ref.
January 5	Pairs	(Australia) Anastasia Golubeva / Hektor Giotopoulos Moore	—N/a		
January 5	Ice dance	(Australia) Chantelle Kerry / Andrew Dodds	—N/a		
January 6	Women	(Japan) Satoko Miyahara	(Japan) Yuhana Yokoi	Poor physical condition	
January 10	Men	(Mexico) Donovan Carrillo	—N/a	COVID-19 precaution	
January 10	Women	(Hong Kong) Joanna So	—N/a		
January 10	Pairs	(Australia) Maria Chernyshova / Harley Windsor	—N/a		
January 15	Men	(South Africa) Matthew Samuels	—N/a		
January 17	Men	(Canada) Wesley Chiu	—N/a	Positive COVID-19 test (coach)	

== Medal summary ==
=== Medalists ===
Medals awarded to the skaters who achieve the highest overall placements in each discipline:

Discipline	Gold	Silver	Bronze
Men	(South Korea) Cha Jun-hwan	(Japan) Kazuki Tomono	(Japan) Kao Miura
Women	(Japan) Mai Mihara	(South Korea) Lee Hae-in	(South Korea) Kim Ye-lim
Pairs	(United States) Audrey Lu / Misha Mitrofanov	(United States) Emily Chan / Spencer Akira Howe	(Canada) Evelyn Walsh / Trennt Michaud
Ice dance	(United States) Caroline Green / Michael Parsons	(Japan) Kana Muramoto / Daisuke Takahashi	(United States) Christina Carreira / Anthony Ponomarenko

Small medals awarded to the skaters who achieve the highest short program or rhythm dance placements in each discipline:

Discipline	Gold	Silver	Bronze
Men	(South Korea) Cha Jun-hwan	(Japan) Kazuki Tomono	(Japan) Kao Miura
Women	(Japan) Mai Mihara	(South Korea) Lee Hae-in	(South Korea) Kim Ye-lim
Pairs	(United States) Audrey Lu / Misha Mitrofanov	(Canada) Evelyn Walsh / Trennt Michaud	(United States) Emily Chan / Spencer Akira Howe
Ice dance	(United States) Caroline Green / Michael Parsons	(Japan) Kana Muramoto / Daisuke Takahashi	(United States) Christina Carreira / Anthony Ponomarenko

Small medals awarded to the skaters who achieve the highest free skating or free dance placements in each discipline:

Discipline	Gold	Silver	Bronze
Men	(South Korea) Cha Jun-hwan	(Japan) Kazuki Tomono	(Japan) Kao Miura
Women	(Japan) Mai Mihara	(South Korea) Lee Hae-in	(Japan) Rino Matsuike
Pairs	(United States) Audrey Lu / Misha Mitrofanov	(United States) Emily Chan / Spencer Akira Howe	(Canada) Evelyn Walsh / Trennt Michaud
Ice dance	(United States) Caroline Green / Michael Parsons	(Japan) Kana Muramoto / Daisuke Takahashi	(United States) Christina Carreira / Anthony Ponomarenko

=== Medals by country ===
Table of medals for overall placement:

Rank	Nation	Gold	Silver	Bronze	Total
1	United States	2	1	1	4
2	Japan	1	2	1	4
3	South Korea	1	1	1	3
4	Canada	0	0	1	1
Totals (4 entries)		4	4	4	12

== Results ==
=== Men ===
Rank	Name	Nation	Total points	SP		FS	
1	Cha Jun-hwan	South Korea	273.22	1	98.96	1	174.26
2	Kazuki Tomono	Japan	268.99	2	97.10	2	171.89
3	Kao Miura	Japan	251.07	3	88.37	3	162.70
4	Sena Miyake	Japan	240.02	5	79.67	4	160.35
5	Mikhail Shaidorov	Kazakhstan	234.67	8	75.96	5	158.71
6	Brendan Kerry	Australia	227.57	4	81.12	8	146.45
7	Lee Si-hyeong	South Korea	223.18	6	79.13	11	144.05
8	Tomoki Hiwatashi	United States	222.37	7	77.51	10	144.86
9	Joseph Phan	Canada	220.85	10	69.70	6	151.15
10	Jimmy Ma	United States	215.12	9	69.98	9	145.14
11	Corey Circelli	Canada	213.02	11	69.57	12	143.15
12	Camden Pulkinen	United States	204.39	14	57.58	7	146.81
13	Dias Jirenbayev	Kazakhstan	192.92	12	66.92	13	126.00
14	Kyeong Jae-seok	South Korea	187.97	13	63.78	14	124.19
15	James Min	Australia	155.02	15	54.35	15	100.67
16	Jordan Dodds	Australia	139.15	16	47.47	16	91.68
WD	Harrison Jon-Yen Wong	Hong Kong	withdrew	17	43.95	withdrew from competition	

=== Women ===
Rank	Name	Nation	Total points	SP		FS	
1	Mai Mihara	Japan	218.03	1	72.62	1	145.51
2	Lee Hae-in	South Korea	213.52	2	69.97	2	143.55
3	Kim Ye-lim	South Korea	209.91	3	68.93	4	140.98
4	Audrey Shin	United States	203.86	5	67.20	5	136.66
5	Rino Matsuike	Japan	202.21	8	60.16	3	142.05
6	You Young	South Korea	198.56	4	67.86	7	130.70
7	Yuhana Yokoi	Japan	185.34	12	53.93	6	131.41
8	Gabriella Izzo	United States	180.06	7	63.19	8	116.87
9	Starr Andrews	United States	173.01	6	66.60	12	106.41
10	Gabrielle Daleman	Canada	172.98	9	59.01	9	113.97
11	Alison Schumacher	Canada	168.42	11	57.36	10	111.06
12	Kailani Craine	Australia	164.02	10	57.46	11	106.56
13	Véronik Mallet	Canada	151.87	13	53.77	13	98.10
14	Jocelyn Hong	New Zealand	145.62	18	48.60	14	97.02
15	Ting Tzu-Han	Chinese Taipei	145.57	17	49.15	14	96.42
16	Sofia Lexi Jacqueline Frank	Philippines	139.26	14	52.74	17	86.52
17	Victoria Alcantara	Australia	138.26	16	49.73	16	88.53
18	Andrea Montesinos Cantú	Mexico	133.03	19	47.36	18	85.67
19	Eugenia Garza	Mexico	128.73	15	51.16	20	77.57
20	Tara Prasad	India	127.93	20	43.31	19	84.62

=== Pairs ===
Rank	Name	Nation	Total points	SP		FS	
1	Audrey Lu / Misha Mitrofanov	United States	189.10	1	68.35	1	120.75
2	Emily Chan / Spencer Akira Howe	United States	180.94	3	64.47	2	116.47
3	Evelyn Walsh / Trennt Michaud	Canada	179.70	2	65.42	3	114.28
4	Deanna Stellato-Dudek / Maxime Deschamps	Canada	172.71	5	59.07	4	113.64
5	Katie McBeath / Nathan Bartholomay	United States	168.18	4	59.54	5	108.64
6	Lori-Ann Matte / Thierry Ferland	Canada	163.60	6	55.40	6	108.20

=== Ice dance ===
Rank	Name	Nation	Total points	RD		FD	
1	Caroline Green / Michael Parsons	United States	200.59	1	80.62	1	119.97
2	Kana Muramoto / Daisuke Takahashi	Japan	181.91	2	72.43	2	109.48
3	Christina Carreira / Anthony Ponomarenko	United States	175.67	3	69.35	3	106.32
4	Carolane Soucisse / Shane Firus	Canada	172.45	4	69.15	4	103.30
5	Emily Bratti / Ian Somerville	United States	169.54	6	67.72	5	101.82
6	Marie-Jade Lauriault / Romain Le Gac	Canada	166.89	5	68.66	6	98.23
7	Haley Sales / Nikolas Wamsteeker	Canada	160.99	7	62.95	7	98.04
8	Holly Harris / Jason Chan	Australia	157.00	8	59.07	8	97.93
9	Charlotte Lafond-Fournier / Richard Kang-in Kam	New Zealand	141.11	9	57.31	9	83.80
10	India Nette / Eron Westwood	Australia	113.15	10	40.89	10	72.26
