= Bruce Waddell =

Canadian figure skater

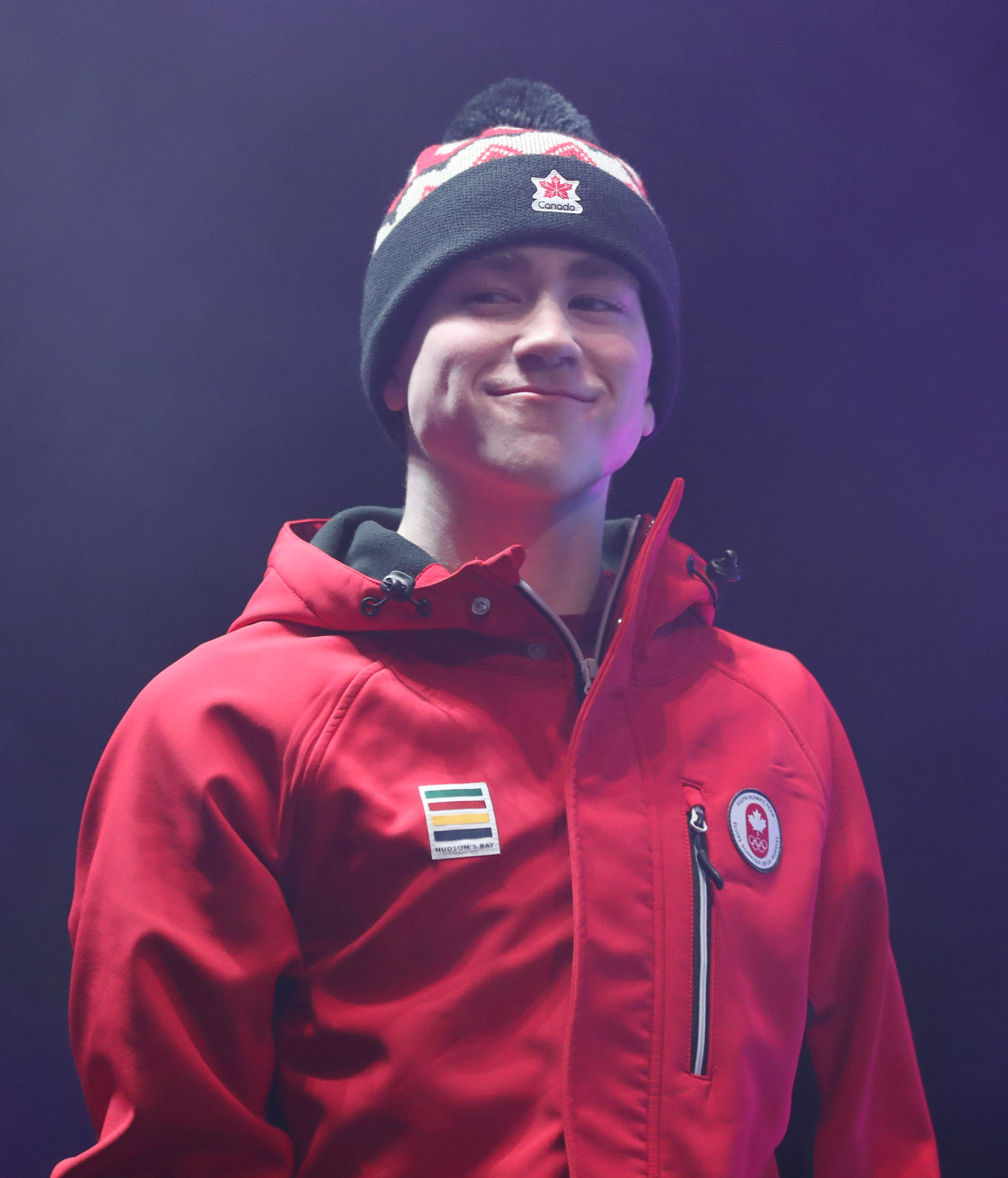
- Waddell at the 2020 Winter Youth Olympics

Personal information
- Born: November 28, 2001 (age 24) Toronto, Ontario, Canada
- Height: 1.78 m (5 ft 10 in)

Figure skating career
- Country: Canada
- Discipline: Men's singles (since 2016); Ice dance (2016–22)
- Coach: Andrew Hallam; Joey Russell; Tracy Wilson
- Skating club: Toronto Cricket, Skating and Curling Club
- Began skating: 2002

Medal record
Winter Youth Olympics
Bronze medal – third place	2020 Lausanne	Team
World Junior Championships
Silver medal – second place	2022 Tallinn	Ice dance

Bruce Waddell (born November 28, 2001) is a Canadian ice dancer and singles skater. With his skating partner, Natalie D'Alessandro, he is the 2022 World Junior silver medallist and 2022 Canadian national junior champion. They have won three medals on the ISU Junior Grand Prix series, including gold at the 2021 JGP Slovakia, and bronze in the 2020 Winter Youth Olympics team event.

== Personal life ==
Waddell was born on November 28, 2001, in Toronto, Canada. He has two older brothers, twins George and Charles. Charles is a former ice dancer, and George currently competes in ice dance, representing Great Britain. He enjoys playing the piano and skateboarding. He is the grandson of NHL hockey star Leonard "Red" Kelly and his uncle Patrick Kelly is an Olympic speed skater. Waddell has dual Canadian-British citizenship.

== Skating career ==
Waddell started skating in 2002. Both he and Natalie D'Alessandro trained as singles skaters at the Toronto Cricket, Skating and Curling Club and initially tried out as a dance team at the suggestion of the TCC's dance coach, Andrew Hallam. D'Alessandro/Waddell were pre-novice champions at the 2016 Skate Canada Challenge and then won the novice title at the 2017 Canadian Championships. Making their international debut as a dance team, they placed fourth at the 2017 Bavarian Open in the advanced novice division.

=== 2017–18 season: Junior debut ===
D'Alessandro/Waddell were assigned by Skate Canada to make their debut on the ISU Junior Grand Prix, with one assignment to the 2017 JGP Australia in Brisbane. Placing sixth, Waddell commented that the international competition made them "more nervous than usual." Competing at the 2018 Canadian Junior Championships, they placed eighth.

=== 2018–19 season: Junior national bronze ===
Given two assignments on the Junior Grand Prix, D'Alessandro/Waddell were fourth at the 2018 JGP Austria and sixth at the 2018 JGP Canada, the latter held in Richmond, British Columbia. Competing at the 2019 Canadian Junior Championships, they won the bronze medal.

=== 2019–20 season: First JGP medal ===
Again assigned to two events on the Junior Grand Prix, D'Alessandro/Waddell began the season at the 2019 JGP Latvia, where they placed fourth, missing the bronze medal by 0.68 points after sitting in third after the rhythm dance. At their second event, the 2019 JGP Italy, they won the silver medal, the highest colour of medal won by a Canadian dance team on the Junior Grand Prix that season. D'Alessandro commented afterwards, "seeing your name on the podium with the Canadian flag next to it is a pretty cool feeling."

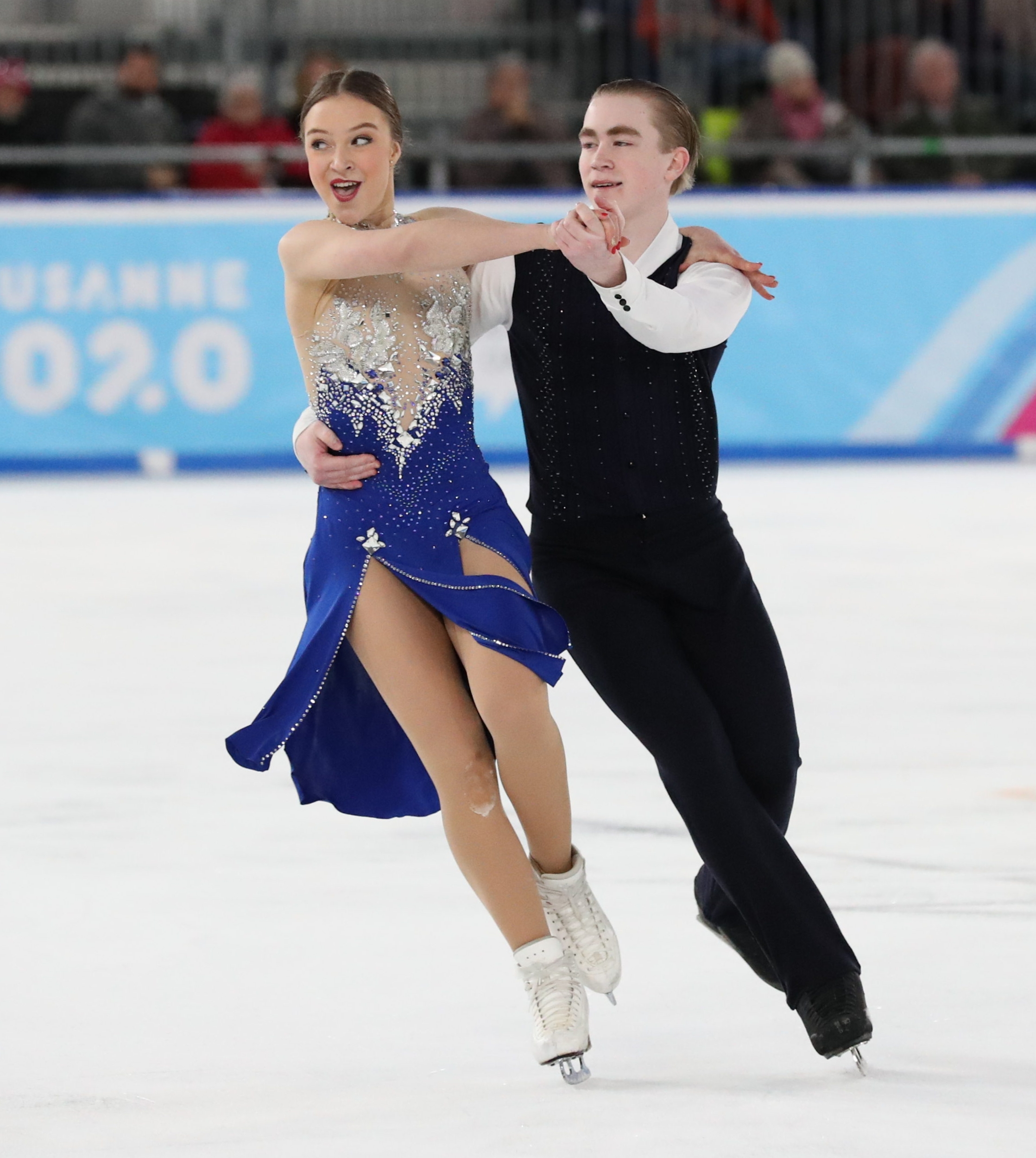
D'Alessandro & Waddell compete in the rhythm dance at the 2020 Winter Youth Olympics

D'Alessandro/Waddell won the gold at the 2020 Skate Canada Challenge. This would be their final domestic competition of the season, as they were assigned as part of the Canadian delegation to the 2020 Winter Youth Olympics in Lausanne, which both had had as a longtime goal. Competing in the ice dance event in Lausanne, D'Alessandro/Waddell placed third in the rhythm dance despite encountering level issues on several elements. These continued in the free dance, where they placed fifth and dropped to fourth place overall, 0.91 points behind bronze medallists Wolfkostin/Chen. Waddell said after, "there were a few technical errors, but I definitely still had a blast." They subsequently won a bronze medal in the team event.

Skate Canada assigned D'Alessandro/Waddell to one of Canada's three berths at the 2020 World Junior Championships in Tallinn, Estonia, and also to compete at the 2020 Bavarian Open in the junior division. They won the bronze medal, narrowly behind fellow Canadians Bronsard/Bouaraguia. D'Alessandro/Waddell finished the season at the World Junior Championships, where they placed eleventh, narrowly behind the other Canadian teams competing, Bronsard/Bouraguia and Makita/Gunara.

=== 2020–21 season ===
With the COVID-19 pandemic severely constraining competitions, both the ISU Junior Grand Prix and the 2021 World Junior Championships were cancelled. As well, in-person domestic competition was limited, as a result of which D'Alessandro/Waddell competed only once during the season at a virtually-held 2021 Skate Canada Challenge. They won the gold medal. The 2021 Canadian Junior Championships were subsequently cancelled.

=== 2021–22 season: World Junior silver ===
With the resumption of the Junior Grand Prix, D'Alessandro/Waddell returned to international competition at the 2021 JGP Slovakia in Košice. Second in the rhythm dance, they won the free dance and took the gold medal. D'Alessandro commented on the effects of the pandemic, saying the long absence from competition "made us hungrier and more excited to come out here." Weeks later, at their second event, the 2021 JGP Slovenia in Ljubljana, they won the bronze medal.

In November, D'Alessandro/Waddell competed at the junior event at the 2021 Ice Challenge in Graz. Second in the short program, they won the free dance and took the gold medal, their second international win of the season. Waddell assessed the result as having had "lots of positives but also a couple of negatives we weren't as happy about. But that’s super necessary for us to happen in order to realize the difference between this and an amazing performance." While their results on the Junior Grand Prix had qualified them to the Junior Grand Prix Final in December, this event was cancelled as a result of restrictions prompted by the Omicron variant.

Entering the 2022 Canadian Junior Championships as the favourites for the gold medal, they won both programs to take their first national junior title. They were subsequently sent to compete at the Egna Trophy, taking the silver medal in the junior competition.

Due to the pandemic, the 2022 World Junior Championships could not be held as scheduled in Sofia in early March and, as a result, were rescheduled for Tallinn in mid-April. Due to the Russian invasion of Ukraine, the International Skating Union banned all Russian and Belarusian athletes from participating, which had a significant impact on the dance field. In the rhythm dance, D'Alessandro/Waddell scored an even 64 points, finishing in second place. They were third in the free dance, but won the silver medal. D'Alessandro said afterward, "this season, we've trained so hard, so many mornings, and finishing it off on the podium at a competition like this...it still has not sunk in." With Bashynska/Beaumont winning the bronze medal, it was the first time two Canadian dance teams had stood on the podium together at the World Junior Championships.

On May 3, 2022, D'Alessandro and Waddell announced on their joint Instagram account that they would no longer be skating together, stating, "the time has come when we are excited to move on with new separate adventures."

== Programs ==
Season	Rhythm dance	Free dance
2021–2022	Blues: Son of a Preacher Man (from Pulp Fiction) by Dusty Springfield; Hitting the Fan (from The Good Wife) by David Buckley; Pump It by Black Eyed Peas choreo. by Romain Haguenauer	Swan Lake by Pyotr Ilyich Tchaikovsky choreo. by Romain Haguenauer
2020–2021	Foxtrot: He Loves and She Loves (from Funny Face) by George Gershwin; Quickstep: Le Jazz Hot! (from Victor/Victoria) by Henry Mancini both performed by Julie Andrews choreo. by Romain Haguenauer	Swan Lake by Pyotr Ilyich Tchaikovsky choreo. by Romain Haguenauer
2019–2020	Foxtrot: He Loves and She Loves (from Funny Face) by George Gershwin; Quickstep: Le Jazz Hot! (from Victor/Victoria) by Henry Mancini both performed by Julie Andrews choreo. by Romain Haguenauer	I'd Do Anything For Love (But I Won't Do That) by Jim Steinman performed by Meat Loaf choreo. by Romain Haguenauer
2018–2019	Argentine Tango: Querer; Tango: Toreado (from Cirque du Soleil) by René Dupéré choreo. by Romain Haguenauer	Malagueña by Ernesto Lecuona; Carmen Suite by Rodion Shchedrin after Bizet choreo. by Romain Haguenauer
	Short dance	
2017–2018	Cha cha: I Need to Know by Marc Anthony; Cha cha: Let's Get Loud (from On the 6) by Jennifer Lopez choreo. by Romain Haguenauer	Compilation 74: Your Song by Elton John, Bernie Taupin; Your Song performed by Ewan McGregor, Alessandro Safina; Original Arrangement/A Wonderful Love by Karl Hugo choreo. by Romain Haguenauer

== Competitive highlights ==
=== Single skating ===
Competition placements at senior level
Season	2020–21	2021–22	2022–23	2023–24	2024–25	2025-26
Canadian Championships		16th	15th	10th	7th	14th
Cranberry Cup			6th	12th		
Skate Canada Challenge	12th	10th	4th	7th	9th	8th

Competition placements at junior level
Season	2016–17	2017–18	2018–19	2019–20
Canadian Championships	11th	7th	4th	
Skate Canada Challenge	10th	5th	10th	4th

=== Ice dance with Natalie D'Alessandro ===
ISU personal best scores in the +5/-5 GOE System
Segment	Type	Score	Event
Total	TSS	163.04	2021 JGP Slovakia
Rhythm dance	TSS	64.48	2021 JGP Slovakia
Rhythm dance	TES	34.92	2021 JGP Slovakia
Rhythm dance	PCS	30.05	2022 World Junior Championships
Free dance	TSS	98.56	2021 JGP Slovakia
Free dance	TES	52.74	2021 JGP Slovakia
Free dance	PCS	47.01	2022 World Junior Championships

ISU personal bests in the +3/-3 GOE System (from 2010–11)
Segment	Type	Score	Event
Total	TSS	113.25	2017 JGP Australia
Short dance	TSS	47.70	2017 JGP Australia
Short dance	TES	26.30	2017 JGP Australia
Short dance	PCS	22.40	2017 JGP Australia
Free dance	TSS	65.55	2017 JGP Australia
Free dance	TES	30.96	2017 JGP Australia
Free dance	PCS	34.59	2017 JGP Australia

- JGP – Event of the ISU Junior Grand Prix Series
- C – Event was cancelled

Competition placements at junior level
Season	2017–18	2018–19	2019–20	2020–21	2021–22
Winter Youth Olympics			4th		
Winter Youth Olympics (Team event)			3rd		
World Junior Championships			11th		2nd
Canadian Championships	8th	3rd		C	1st
JGP Australia	6th				
JGP Austria		4th			
JGP Canada		6th			
JGP Italy			2nd		
JGP Latvia			4th		
JGP Slovakia					1st
JGP Slovenia					3rd
Bavarian Open			3rd		
Egna Trophy					2nd
Ice Challenge					1st
Skate Canada Challenge	10th	7th	1st	1st	

== Detailed results ==
=== Men's singles ===
Results in the 2022–23 season
Date	Event	SP		FS		Total	
Date	Event	P	Score	P	Score	P	Score
Aug 9–14, 2022	(United States) 2022 Cranberry Cup International	6	62.39	5	122.06	6	184.45
Nov 30 – Dec 3, 2022	2023 Skate Canada Challenge	5	66.17	5	130.55	4	196.72
Jan 9–15, 2023	(Canada) 2023 Canadian Championships	7	70.37	15	106.02	15	176.39

Results in the 2023–24 season
Date	Event	SP		FS		Total	
Date	Event	P	Score	P	Score	P	Score
Aug 11–14, 2023	(United States) 2023 Cranberry Cup International	14	58.72	8	120.56	12	179.28
Nov 29 – Dec 3, 2023	2024 Skate Canada Challenge	4	71.71	7	112.72	7	184.43
Jan 7–14, 2024	(Canada) 2024 Canadian Championships	8	65.86	9	121.17	10	187.03

Results in the 2024–25 season
Date	Event	SP		FS		Total	
Date	Event	P	Score	P	Score	P	Score
Jan 14–19, 2025	(Canada) 2025 Canadian Championships	6	63.84	6	118.13	7	181.97

Results in the 2025–26 season
Date	Event	SP		FS		Total	
Date	Event	P	Score	P	Score	P	Score
Nov 27–29, 2025	2025 Skate Canada Challenge	8	67.79	10	124.08	8	191.87
Jan 6–11, 2026	(Canada) 2026 Canadian Championships	17	59.27	12	126.83	14	186.10

=== Ice dance with Natalie D'Alessandro ===
2021–22 season
Date	Event	RD	FD	Total
April 13–17, 2022	2022 World Junior Championships	2; 64.00	3; 98.56	2; 162.56
February 4–6, 2022	2022 Egna Dance Trophy	2; 62.62	2; 97.09	2; 167.06
January 6–12, 2022	2022 Canadian Junior Championships	1; 70.79	1; 104.24	1; 175.03
November 11–14, 2021	2021 Ice Challenge	2; 60.65	1; 93.01	1; 153.66
September 22–25, 2021	2021 JGP Slovenia	2; 64.26	3; 97.53	3; 161.79
September 1–4, 2021	2021 JGP Slovakia	2; 64.48	1; 98.56	1; 163.04
2020–21 season
Date	Event	RD	FD	Total
January 15–17, 2021	2021 Skate Canada Junior Challenge	1; 68.08	1; 101.79	1; 169.87
2019–20 season
Date	Event	RD	FD	Total
March 2–8, 2020	2020 World Junior Championships	9; 61.63	12; 90.16	11; 151.79
February 3–9, 2020	2020 Bavarian Open	3; 61.48	3; 93.57	3; 155.05
January 10–15, 2020	2020 Winter Youth Olympics – Team	–	3; 95.73	3T/3P
January 10–15, 2020	2020 Winter Youth Olympics	3; 59.61	5; 91.91	4; 151.52
Nov. 27 – Dec. 1, 2019	2020 Skate Canada Junior Challenge	1; 69.79	1; 104.53	1; 174.32
October 2–5, 2019	2019 JGP Italy	2; 63.25	3; 89.51	2; 152.76
September 4–7, 2019	2019 JGP Latvia	3; 61.68	4; 90.44	4; 152.12
2018–19 season
Date	Event	RD	FD	Total
January 13–20, 2019	2019 Canadian Junior Championships	6; 58.75	2; 97.04	3; 155.79
Nov. 28 – Dec. 2, 2018	2019 Skate Canada Junior Challenge	5; 58.14	6; 88.70	7; 146.84
September 12–15, 2018	2018 JGP Canada	7; 52.94	4; 85.19	6; 138.13
Aug. 29 – Sept. 1, 2018	2018 JGP Austria	5; 50.45	3; 84.97	4; 135.42
2017–18 season
Date	Event	SD	FD	Total
January 8–14, 2018	2018 Canadian Junior Championships	9; 50.99	8; 72.84	8; 123.83
Nov. 28 – Dec. 2, 2017	2018 Skate Canada Junior Challenge	11; 44.90	7; 67.92	10; 112.82
August 23–26, 2017	2017 JGP Australia	6; 47.70	6; 65.55	6; 113.25
