= Yvan Desjardins =

Canadian figure skating coach

Personal information
- Born: October 6, 1975 (age 50) Boisbriand, Quebec, Canada
- Height: 1.83 m (6 ft 0 in)

Figure skating career
- Country: Canada
- Skating club: CPA Boisbriand
- Retired: 1997

Yvan Desjardins (born October 6, 1975) is a Canadian figure skating coach and former competitor. He reached the free skate at two ISU Championships.

== Career ==
Desjardins competed at the 1993 and 1994 World Junior Championships, qualifying to the free skate at both events. His best final result, 11th, came in 1993 in Seoul, South Korea.

After retiring from competition, Desjardins became a coach, based in Rosemère, Quebec. In August 2015, he became only the 13th person to achieve Level 5 in Skate Canada's National Coaching Certification Program. In 2016, he received the Skate Canada Competitive Coach Award of Excellence. His past and present students include, Nicolas Nadeau, Jessica Dubé, Shawn Sawyer and Joseph Phan.

== Personal life ==
Desjardins was born on October 6, 1975, in Boisbriand, Quebec. He studied at the Université de Montréal. He is married to figure skating coach Claudine Morency and has two children.

== Competitive highlights ==
International
Event	91–92	92–93	93–94	94–95	96–97
Czech Skate				7th	
Nebelhorn Trophy					11th
International: Junior
World Junior Champ.		11th	18th		
Blue Swords			2nd J		
National
Canadian Champ.	5th J	7th J	2nd J	13th	10th
