= Lori-Ann Matte =

Canadian pair skater

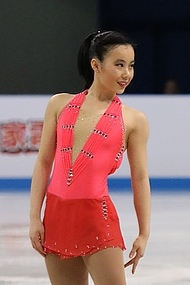
- Lori-Ann Matte at the 2020 World Junior Championships

Personal information
- Born: June 30, 1999 (age 27) Yongxiu, China
- Height: 1.52 m (5 ft 0 in)

Figure skating career
- Country: Canada (2015–23, since 2026); France (since 2023)
- Discipline: Pair skating
- Partner: Thierry Ferland (2015–23, since 2026); Noël-Antoine Pierre (2023–24)
- Began skating: 2004

Medal record
Representing France
French Championships
| Bronze medal – third place | 2024 Vaujany | Pairs |

Lori-Ann Matte (born June 30, 1999) is a Canadian pair skater. With her current partner, Thierry Ferland, she is the 2018 Canadian national junior champion and finished within the top ten at two World Junior Championships (2017, 2018).

As of August 2023, she is paired with French skater Noel-Antoine Pierre.

== Personal life ==
Lori-Ann Matte was born June 30, 1999, in Yongxiu, China, and grew up in Lévis, Quebec, Canada. As of 2018, she is enrolled at Collège de Rosemont in Montréal.

== Career ==
=== Early years ===
Matte began learning to skate in 2004. She teamed up with Thierry Ferland around 2010. The pair won the novice bronze medal at the 2015 Canadian Championships and the novice silver medal at the 2015 Canada Winter Games. The following season, they moved up to the junior level and placed 6th at the 2016 Canadian Championships.

=== 2016–2017 season ===
Matte/Ferland made their ISU Junior Grand Prix debut in September 2016. After winning the junior silver medal at the 2017 Canadian Championships, they were assigned to the 2017 World Junior Championships in Taipei. The pair ranked 7th in the short program, 12th in the free skate, and 9th overall at the competition in Taiwan. They were coached by Martine Simard in Lévis, Quebec until the end of the season. In May 2017, they relocated to Montréal.

=== 2017–2018 season ===
The pair lost several weeks of training after Matte broke her elbow in the autumn of 2017. In January, Matte/Ferland won the junior pairs' title at the 2018 Canadian Championships. They placed 10th in the short program, 7th in the free skate, and 9th overall at the 2018 World Junior Championships, which took place in March in Sofia, Bulgaria. Richard Gauthier and Bruno Marcotte coached the pair in Montréal.

=== 2018–2019 season ===
Making their senior international debut, Matte/Ferland placed fifth at the 2018 CS Autumn Classic International in September. They were fourth at the 2020 Canadian Championships.

=== 2019–2020 season ===
Competing at two Challenger events to begin the season, Matte/Ferland were eight at the 2019 CS U.S. Classic and seventh at the 2019 CS Warsaw Cup. They placed fifth at the 2020 Canadian Championships.

=== 2020–2021 season ===
Matte/Ferland were assigned to make their Grand Prix debut at the 2020 Skate Canada International, but the event was cancelled as a result of the coronavirus pandemic. They made their competitive debut at the 2021 Skate Canada Challenge, the qualifying event for the national championships, winning the silver medal.

Matte/Ferland were named as alternates to the 2021 World Championships. With Canada's mandatory two-week quarantine for returning athletes; however, no member of the World team was assigned to the 2021 World Team Trophy, and they assigned as Canada's entry in the pairs segment. They finished sixth in both the short and free programs, while Team Canada finished in sixth place overall.

=== 2021–2022 season ===
Matte/Ferland made their competitive debut at the 2021 CS Autumn Classic International, where they placed seventh. Making their Grand Prix debut, they were seventh as well at the 2021 Skate Canada International. They placed fourth at the 2022 Canadian Championships. Assigned to compete at the 2022 Four Continents Championships, they finished sixth.

=== 2022–2023 season ===
The team began the season with a seventh-place finish at the 2022 CS U.S. Classic. Matte and Ferland were scheduled to compete on the Grand Prix at the 2022 MK John Wilson Trophy, but had to withdraw due to injury.

=== 2023–2024 season ===
Though no official announcement of their spilt happened, in August, she announced that she had been paired with new partner, Noel-Antoine Pierre for seven weeks. According to a post on her Instagram, the two will be competing for France.

== Programs ==
(with Ferland)

| Season | Short program | Free skating |
|---|---|---|
| 2021–2022 | 6's to 9 by Big Wild | Waves by Dean Lewis |
| 2020–2021 | Awoo by Sofi Tukker | Waves by Dean Lewis |
| 2018–2019 | Down the Road by C2C; Happy by C2C, Derek Martin choreo. by Julie Marcotte | Ameksa (District 78 Remix) performed by Taalbi Brothers; Sendero performed by Compania Talent Danza choreo. by Julie Marcotte |
| 2017–2018 | Down the Road by C2C; Happy by C2C, Derek Martin choreo. by Julie Marcotte | The Scientist by Guy Berryman, Jonny Buckland, Will Champion, Chris Martin choreo. by Julie Marcotte |
| 2016–2017 | Too Darn Hot by Cole Porter choreo. by Marc-Olivier Bossé | Life Is Beautiful by Nicola Piovani; Barcarolle; Grand Hotel Valse; Il gioco di Giosuè choreo. by Milena Todaro |
| 2015–2016 | Too Darn Hot by Cole Porter choreo. by Marc-Olivier Bossé | Dream On performed by Glee cast choreo. by Julie Marcotte |

== Competitive highlights ==
GP: Grand Prix; CS: Challenger Series; JGP: Junior Grand Prix

=== With Pierre for France ===
National
| Event | 23–24 |
|---|---|
| Masters | 4th |

=== With Ferland for Canada ===
International
| Event | 15–16 | 16–17 | 17–18 | 18–19 | 19–20 | 20–21 | 21–22 | 22–23 |
|---|---|---|---|---|---|---|---|---|
| Four Continents | | | | | | | 6th | |
| GP Skate Canada | | | | | | C | 7th | |
| CS Autumn Classic | | | | 5th | | | 7th | |
| CS U.S. Classic | | | | | 8th | | | 7th |
| CS Warsaw Cup | | | | | 7th | | 10th | |
International: Junior
| Junior Worlds | | 9th | 9th | | | | | |
| JGP Belarus | | | 8th | | | | | |
| JGP Czech Rep. | | 6th | | | | | | |
| JGP Poland | | | 12th | | | | | |
| JGP Russia | | 4th | | | | | | |
| Bavarian Open | | 2nd | | | | | | |
National
| Canadian Champ. | 6th J | 2nd J | 1st J | 4th | 5th | C | 4th | WD |
| SC Challenge | 2nd J | 2nd J | 1st J | 2nd | | 2nd | 2nd | |
Team events
| World Team Trophy | | | | | | 6th T 6th P | | |
WD = Withdrew; C = Event cancelled J = Junior; T = Team result; P = Personal result. Medals awarded for team result only.
