= Corey Circelli =

Canadian-Italian figure skater (born 2002)

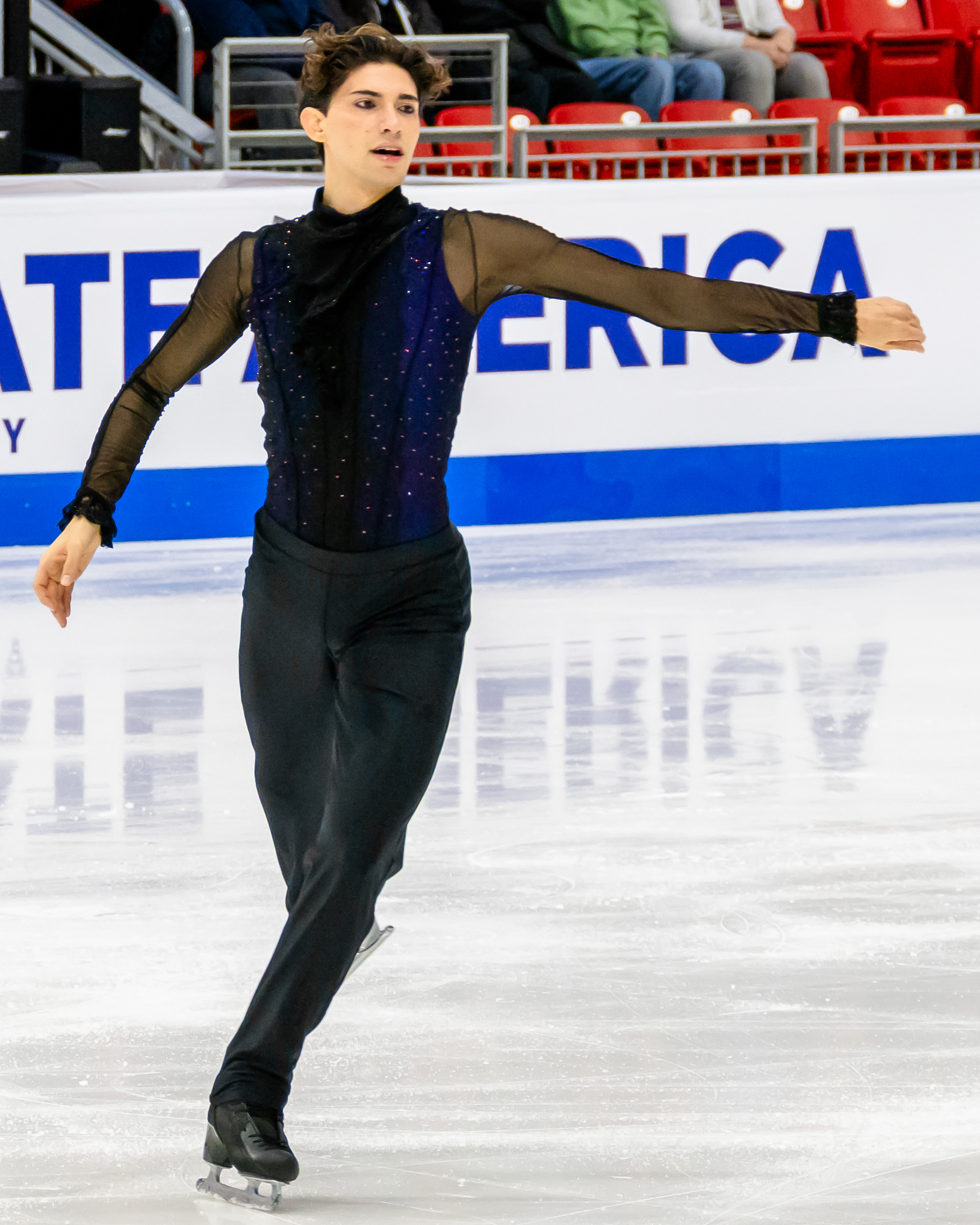
- Corey Circelli at the 2025 Skate America

Personal information
- Born: September 11, 2002 (age 23) Manchester, England, United Kingdom
- Home town: Toronto, Ontario, Canada
- Height: 1.85 m (6 ft 1 in)

Figure skating career
- Country: Italy (since 2023); Canada (2007–23)
- Discipline: Men's singles
- Coach: Olga Romanova
- Skating club: IceLab Bergamo
- Began skating: 2007

Medal record
Representing Italy
Italian Championships
Bronze medal – third place	2024 Pinerolo	Singles
Bronze medal – third place	2026 Begamo	Singles

Corey Circelli (born September 11, 2002) is a Canadian figure skater, who represents Italy. Representing Italy, he is the 2024 Nepela Memorial bronze medalist and a two-time Italian national bronze medalist (2024, 2026).

He represented Canada at the Four Continents Championships and the Grand Prix series. He is the 2020 Canadian national junior champion.

== Personal life ==
Circelli was born in Manchester, England. He is of Italian descent.

== Single skating career ==
=== Early years ===
Circelli began learning to skate in 2007. He won the novice men's title at the 2017 Canadian Championships.

He made his ISU Junior Grand Prix (JGP) debut in September 2017, placing 14th in Riga, Latvia. Competing in the junior men's category, he won silver at the 2018 Canadian Championships and bronze at the 2019 Canadian Championships. At the time, he was coached by Lee Barkell.

=== 2019–20 season: Canadian junior national title ===
Circelli changed coaches for the 2019–20 season, deciding to train under Brian Orser and Tracy Wilson. He placed tenth at his JGP assignment in September 2019 in Poland.

Circelli sustained a torn meniscus in his right knee in late December 2019. In January, he won the national junior men's title at the 2020 Canadian Championships.

=== 2020–21 season ===
The 2020–21 season was significantly impacted by the COVID-19 pandemic, with rink closures and event cancellations. Circelli won bronze in the senior men's event at the Skate Canada Challenge. He qualified to the 2021 Canadian Championships, but the competition was eventually cancelled.

=== 2021–22 season: Senior international debut ===
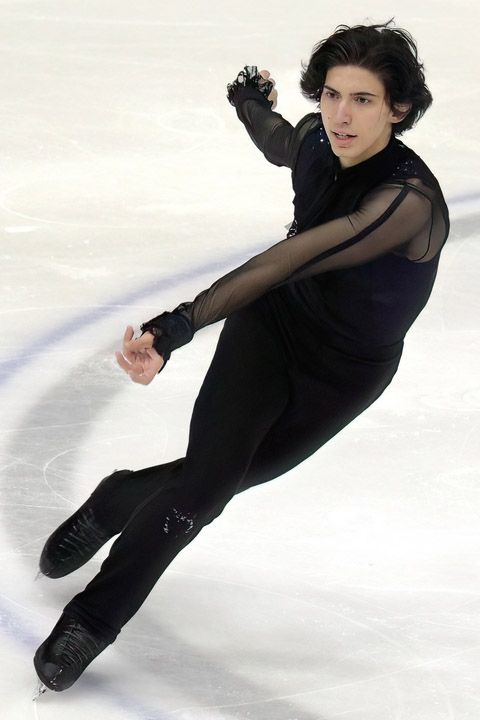
Circelli at the 2021 CS Cup of Austria

In August and September, Circelli competed on the 2021–22 ISU Junior Grand Prix series, placing fourth in France and Slovakia. In November, he made his senior international debut and placed tenth at the 2021 CS Cup of Austria. In January, he placed fifth in the senior men's event at the 2022 Canadian Championships. Later that month, he competed at the 2022 Four Continents Championships in Tallinn, Estonia, and finished eleventh.

=== 2022–23 season ===
Circelli's free skate was a tribute to Canadian champion Toller Cranston. Making his senior Grand Prix debut, Circelli placed tenth at the 2022 MK John Wilson Trophy in Sheffield, England.

=== 2023–24 season: Switch to Italy ===
Circelli failed to re-qualify for the Canadian national team after finishing fifth at the Canadian Championships and no participation in spring competitions. In late November, Circelli competed at a regional competition in Italy and then officially announced his switch to Italy in December. Later that month, he competed at the 2024 Italian Championships, where he earned the bronze medal.

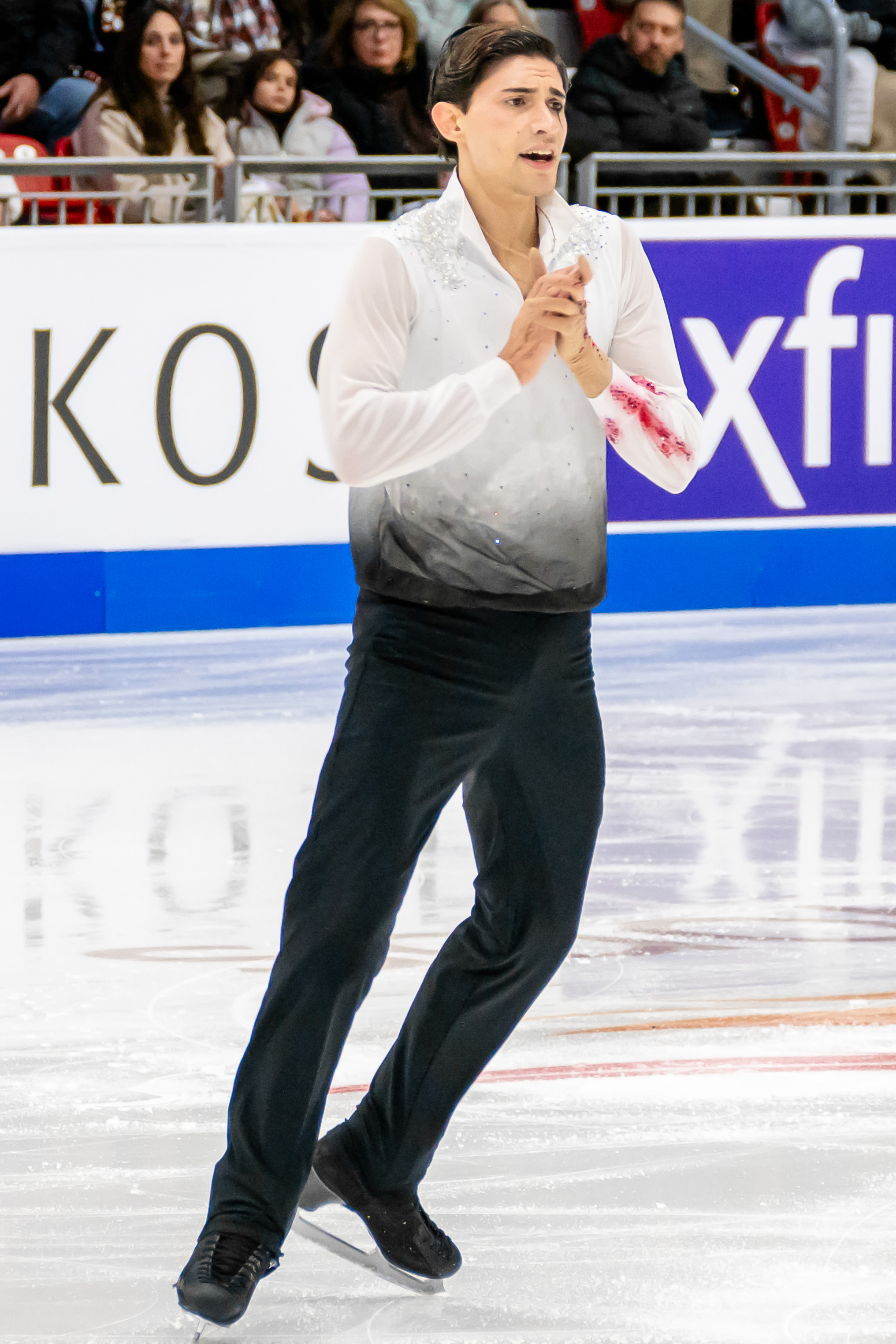
Circelli during his free skate at 2025 Skate America

=== 2024–25 season: Challenger Series bronze ===
Making his international debut competing for Italy, Circelli won the silver medal at the 2024 Tayside Trophy. He then went on to compete on the 2024–25 Challenger Series, taking bronze at the 2024 CS Nepela Memorial and finishing fourteenth at the 2024 CS Tallinn Trophy.

In December, Circelli competed at the 2025 Italian Championships, where he finished in fifth place.

=== 2025–26 season ===
Circelli opened the season by winning silver at the 2025 Swiss Open. He then went on to make his Grand Prix debut for Italy, finishing twelfth at 2025 Skate America. Going on to compete on the 2025–26 Challenger Series, Circelli placed seventh at the 2025 CS Tallinn Trophy and tenth at the 2025 CS Golden Spin of Zagreb.

In late December, he won his second national bronze medal at the 2026 Italian Championships.

== Ice dance career ==
Competing in novice ice dance with Katerina Kasatkin, Circelli placed 5th at the 2016 Canadian Championships and 4th at the 2017 Canadian Championships. Kasatkin and Circelli then moved up to the junior ranks and placed 13th at the 2018 Canadian Championships.

Circelli skated the next two seasons in partnership with Olivia McIsaac. Competing in juniors, McIsaac and Circelli placed eighth at the 2019 Canadian Championships and won the bronze medal at the 2020 Canadian Championships. The two were coached by Andrew Hallam and Tracy Wilson.

== Programs ==
=== Men's singles ===
Competition and exhibition programs by season
Season	Short program	Free skate program	Exhibition program
2017–18	"Hallelujah": Performed by Leonard Cohen; Choreo. by Joey Russell & David Wilson	La bohème: Composed by Giacomo Puccini; Choreo. by Joey Russell & David Wilson	—N/a
2018–19	La traviata: Composed by Giuseppe Verdi; Choreo. by Joey Russell	"Total Eclipse of the Heart": Performed by Jim Steinman; Choreo. by David Wilson	—N/a
2019–20	"Ophelia": Performed by The Lumineers; Choreo. by Jeffrey Buttle	Moonlight Sonata: Composed by Ludwig van Beethoven; Choreo. by David Wilson	—N/a
2020–21	"Io ci sarò": Performed by Andrea Bocelli; Choreo. by David Wilson	The Nutcracker: Composed by Pyotr Ilyich Tchaikovsky; Choreo. by David Wilson	—N/a
2021–22	Prince Medley: 1. "Purple Rain"; 2. "The Question of U"; Performed by Prince; Choreo. by Jeffrey Buttle	The Nutcracker	—N/a
2022–23	Prince Medley	Pagliacci: 1. "Intermezzo; Performed by National Philharmonic Orchestra, Giuseppe Patanè; 2. "Vesti la giubba"; Performed by Luciano Pavarotti, National Philharmonic Orchestra, Giuseppe Patanè; 3. "No, Pagliaccio non son...Suvvia, cosi terribile"; Performed by Luciano Pavarotti, Giuseppe Patanè, Finchley Children's Music Group, National Philharmonic Orchestra, Ingvar Wixell, Mirella Freni, Lorenzo Saccomani, Vincenzo Bello, The London Opera Chorus; Composed by Ruggero Leoncavallo; Choreo. by David Wilson	Prince Medley
2023–24	The Swan: Composed by Camille Saint-Saëns	Gladiator: 1. "The Wheat"; 2. "The Battle"; 3. "Elysium"; 4. "Now We Are Free"; Composed by Hans Zimmer and Lisa Gerrard	—N/a
2024–25	"Mon Dieu": Performed by Édith Piaf; Choreo. by Guillaume Cizeron	"Piano Concerto No.2 in C Minor, Op. 18: 2. Adagio sostenuto": Composed by Sergei Rachmaninoff; Choreo. by Joey Russell	—N/a
2025–26	Prince Medley	Pagliacci	—N/a

=== Ice dance with Olivia McIsaac ===
Competition programs by season
Season	Rhythm dance program	Free dance program
2018–19	Chicago: Composed by Fred Ebb, John Kander; Choreo. by Kelly Johnson & Romain Haguenauer; Tracks used: 1. Foxtrot: "Ouverture"; 2. Foxtrot: "All That Jazz"; 3. Tango: "Cell Block Tango"	"There Will Be Time": Performed by Mumford & Sons, Baaba Maal; Choreo. by Kelly Johnson & Romain Haguenauer
2019–20	Funny Girl: Performed by Barbra Streisand; Choreo. by Kelly Johnson & Romain Haguenauer; Tracks used: 1. "Overture"; 2. Foxtrot: "I'd Rather Be Blue Over You"; 3. Quickstep: "Don't Rain on My Parade"	Medley: 1. "Nature Boy"; Performed by eden ahbez 2. "Danse Macabre"; Composed by Zbigniew Preisner; 3. Danse Macabre; Composed by Camille Saint-Saëns; Choreo. by Kelly Johnson & Romain Haguenauer

== Competitive highlights ==
- GP – Event of the ISU Grand Prix Series
- JGP – Event of the ISU Junior Grand Prix Series
- CS – Event of the ISU Challenger Series
- C – Event was cancelled

=== Single skating (for Italy) ===
Competition placements at senior level
Season	2023–24	2024–25	2025–26
Italian Championships	3rd	5th	3rd
GP Skate America			12th
CS Golden Spin of Zagreb			10th
CS Nepela Memorial		3rd	
CS Tallinn Trophy		14th	7th
Merano Ice Trophy		5th	2nd
Tayside Trophy		2nd	
Road to 26 Trophy		7th	
Sofia Trophy			1st
Sonja Henie Trophy		9th	
Winter University Games		7th	

=== Single skating (for Canada) ===
Competition placements at senior level
Season	2020–21	2021–22	2022–23
Four Continents Championships		11th	
Canadian Championships	C	5th	5th
GP Wilson Trophy			10th
CS Cup of Austria		10th	
CS Golden Spin of Zagreb			7th
Cranberry Cup			7th
Skate Canada Challenge	3rd	3rd	

Competition placements at junior level
Season	2017–18	2018–19	2019–20	2021–22
Canadian Championships	2nd	3rd	1st	
JGP France				4th
JGP Latvia	14th			
JGP Poland		10th		
JGP Slovakia				4th
Skate Canada Challenge	2nd	6th	1st	

=== Ice dance with Olivia McIsaac (for Canada) ===
Competition placements at junior level
Season	2018–19	2019–20
Canadian Championships	8th	3rd
JGP Czech Republic	7th	
JGP France		9th
JGP Italy		12th
Skate Canada Challenge	9th	6th

== Detailed results ==
ISU personal best scores in the +5/-5 GOE System
Segment	Type	Score	Event
Total	TSS	232.36	2024 CS Nepela Memorial
Short program	TSS	77.48	2024 CS Nepela Memorial
Short program	TES	42.07	2024 CS Nepela Memorial
Short program	PCS	35.41	2024 CS Nepela Memorial
Free skating	TSS	154.78	2024 CS Nepela Memorial
Free skating	TES	78.03	2024 CS Nepela Memorial
Free skating	PCS	76.75	2024 CS Nepela Memorial

=== Senior level (for Italy) ===
Results in the 2023–24 season
Date	Event	SP		FS		Total	
Date	Event	P	Score	P	Score	P	Score
Dec 22–23, 2023	(Italy) 2024 Italian Championships	3	72.98	3	141.02	3	214.00

Results in the 2024–25 season
Date	Event	SP		FS		Total	
Date	Event	P	Score	P	Score	P	Score
Oct 12–13, 2024	(United Kingdom) 2024 Tayside Trophy	3	63.31	1	140.79	2	204.10
Oct 25–27, 2024	(Slovakia) 2024 CS Nepela Memorial	3	77.48	3	154.78	3	232.26
Nov 12–17, 2024	(Estonia) 2024 CS Tallinn Trophy	20	53.86	8	132.03	14	185.89
Dec 19–21, 2024	(Italy) 2025 Italian Championships	5	73.82	5	127.16	5	200.98
Jan 16–18, 2025	(Italy) 2025 Winter World University Games	8	70.48	7	140.68	7	211.16
Feb 13–16, 2025	(Italy) 2025 Merano Ice Trophy	4	71.84	6	127.83	5	199.67
Feb 18–20, 2025	(Italy) Road to 26 Trophy	9	65.07	7	137.46	7	202.53
Mar 6–9, 2025	(Norway) 2025 Sonja Henie Trophy	7	66.41	11	103.29	9	169.70

Results in the 2025–26 season
Date	Event	SP		FS		Total	
Date	Event	P	Score	P	Score	P	Score
Oct 23–26, 2025	(Switzerland) 2025 Swiss Open	2	70.77	2	135.07	2	205.84
Nov 14–16, 2025	(United States) 2025 Skate America	12	61.99	11	128.56	12	190.55
Nov 25–30, 2025	(Estonia) 2025 CS Tallinn Trophy	11	64.84	5	147.57	7	212.41
Dec 3–6, 2025	(Croatia) 2025 CS Golden Spin of Zagreb	14	70.70	7	135.69	10	206.39
Dec 17–20, 2025	(Italy) 2026 Italian Championships	3	73.71	3	144.98	3	218.69
Jan 6-11, 2026	(Bulgaria) 2026 Sofia Trophy	1	74.26	1	146.73	1	220.99
Jan 22-25, 2026	(Italy) 2026 Merano Ice Trophy	6	68.31	2	144.32	2	212.63

=== Senior level (for Canada) ===
Results in the 2020–21 season
Date	Event	SP		FS		Total	
Date	Event	P	Score	P	Score	P	Score
Jan 8–17, 2021	2021 Skate Canada Challenge	4	81.11	3	154.39	3	235.50

Results in the 2021–22 season
Date	Event	SP		FS		Total	
Date	Event	P	Score	P	Score	P	Score
Nov 11–14, 2021	2021 CS Cup of Austria	14	67.41	9	134.21	10	201.62
Dec 1–5, 2021	2022 Skate Canada Challenge	9	64.09	2	137.24	3	201.33
Jan 6–12, 2022	(Canada) 2022 Canadian Championships	5	76.64	4	152.97	5	229.61
Jan 18–23, 2022	(Estonia) 2022 Four Continents Championships	11	69.57	12	143.15	11	213.02

Results in the 2022–23 season
Date	Event	SP		FS		Total	
Date	Event	P	Score	P	Score	P	Score
Aug 9–14, 2022	(United States) 2022 Cranberry Cup International	5	67.84	7	114.82	7	182.66
Nov 11–13, 2022	(United Kingdom) 2022 MK John Wilson Trophy	10	62.97	10	119.84	10	182.81
Dec 7–10, 2022	(Croatia) 2022 CS Golden Spin of Zagreb	9	60.03	6	133.62	7	193.65
Jan 9–15, 2023	(Canada) 2023 Canadian Championships	5	75.73	6	136.60	5	212.33

=== Junior level (for Canada) ===
Results in the 2017–18 season
Date	Event	SP		FS		Total	
Date	Event	P	Score	P	Score	P	Score
Sep 6–9, 2017	2017 JGP Latvia	7	59.28	14	96.24	14	155.52
Nov 27 – Dec 1, 2017	2018 Skate Canada Challenge	2	61.62	2	116.19	2	177.81
Jan 8–14, 2018	(Canada) 2018 Canadian Championships (Junior)	2	59.64	3	117.02	2	176.66

Results in the 2018–19 season
Date	Event	SP		FS		Total	
Date	Event	P	Score	P	Score	P	Score
Nov 27 – Dec 1, 2018	2019 Skate Canada Challenge	10	51.47	4	103.69	6	155.16
Jan 13–19, 2019	(Canada) 2019 Canadian Championships (Junior)	1	68.79	4	113.19	3	181.98

Results in the 2019–20 season
Date	Event	SP		FS		Total	
Date	Event	P	Score	P	Score	P	Score
Sep 18–21, 2021	2021 JGP Poland	9	65.24	11	107.48	10	172.72
Nov 27 – Dec 1, 2019	2020 Skate Canada Challenge	1	68.69	3	115.77	1	184.46
Jan 13–19, 2020	(Canada) 2020 Canadian Championships (Junior)	2	72.37	1	130.76	1	203.13

Results in the 2021–22 season
Date	Event	SP		FS		Total	
Date	Event	P	Score	P	Score	P	Score
Aug 18–21, 2021	2021 JGP France I	2	76.63	6	105.52	4	182.15
Sep 1–4, 2021	2021 JGP Slovakia	8	62.60	3	128.53	4	191.13
