= Nicolas Nadeau =

Canadian figure skater

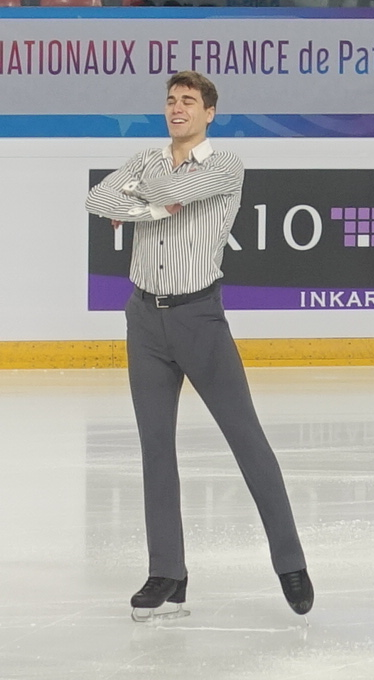

Personal information
- Born: September 30, 1997 (age 29) Montreal, Quebec
- Home town: Boisbriand, Quebec
- Height: 1.86 m (6 ft 1 in)

Figure skating career
- Country: Canada
- Coach: Yvan Desjardins, Stéphanie Valois
- Skating club: Patinage des Mille-Îles
- Began skating: 2003
Medal record
Representing Canada
Figure skating: Men's singles
World Junior Championships
Silver medal – second place	2016 Debrecen	Men's singles

Nicolas Nadeau (born September 30, 1997) is a retired Canadian competitive figure skater. Competing in pair skating with his partner Emmanuelle Proft, they are the 2023 CS Autumn Classic International bronze medallists.

Nadeau previously competed as a singles skater, enjoying notable success at the junior level, where he won the silver medal at the 2016 World Junior Championships. He was also the 2015 Canadian national junior champion.

== Personal life ==
Nadeau was born on September 30, 1997, in Montreal, Quebec. He has three older sisters – Tania, Paméla, and Mélissa. He enjoys skiing in addition to figure skating.

== Career ==
=== Early years ===
Nadeau began learning to skate in 2003. He has been coached by Yvan Desjardins since the summer 2004.

Competing on the junior level, Nadeau placed sixth at the 2013 Canadian Championships and fourth in 2014.

=== 2014–2015 season ===
Nadeau made his international debut in the 2014–2015 season, being selected to compete on the ISU Junior Grand Prix (JGP) series. He placed fifth at his first JGP event, in Aichi, Japan, and tenth in Zagreb, Croatia. He became the national junior champion at the 2015 Canadian Championships in Kingston, Ontario. This earned him a berth to the 2015 World Junior Championships in Tallinn, Estonia, but he missed qualifying for the free skate by one spot, having placed 25th in the short program.

=== 2015–2016 season ===
In 2015–2016, Nadeau started his season at the JGP in Riga, Latvia; he finished fifth after placing second in the short program and seventh in the free skate. He won the silver medal at his second JGP event, in Zagreb, Croatia, finishing 0.38 points behind the gold medallist, Alexander Samarin.

In January 2016, Nadeau placed fifth on the senior level at the 2016 Canadian Nationals and was given Canada's sole spot in men's singles at the 2016 World Junior Championships in Debrecen, Hungary. Competing in March at Junior Worlds, he qualified for the final segment by placing eighth in the short program and second in the free skate, winning the silver medal overall.

=== 2016–2017 season ===
Nadeau withdrew from his JGP assignments due to an ankle injury, which occurred while practising a quad toe loop jump and took about three months to heal. He returned to competition at the 2016 CS Golden Spin of Zagreb, his first senior international, and finished 11th. At the 2017 Canadian Championships, he placed fifth in the short program, third in the free skate, and fourth overall.

=== 2017–2018 season ===
Nadeau began his season at the 2017 Nepela Trophy, where he placed sixth. He then made his debut appearance on the senior Grand Prix at the 2017 Skate Canada International, where he placed seventh. He placed ninth at the 2018 Canadian Championships.

=== 2018–2019 season ===
Beginning the season at the 2018 Finlandia Trophy, Nadeau placed fourth, less than four points behind from bronze medallist Morisi Kvitelashvili. Nadeau said that he needed to work on executing the one quadruple jump in his free skate. He subsequently competed in the short program at his lone Grand Prix assignment for the year, the 2018 Internationaux de France, but withdrew for medical reasons.

At the 2019 Canadian Championships, Nadeau placed seventh in the short program after singling his triple Axel attempt and receiving a negative Grade of Execution on his quadruple toe loop. He rallied in the free skate, where he placed fourth and moved up to sixth place overall. While he finished sixth overall, three of the skaters who finished ahead of him (Stephen Gogolev, Joseph Phan and Conrad Orzel) were ineligible to compete as seniors due to either their age or a lack of the required minimum technical scores, and consequently, Nadeau was named to Canada's team for the 2019 Four Continents Championships, when he finished eleventh.

=== 2019–2020 season ===
After withdrawing from the 2019 CS U.S. Classic, Nadeau competed on the Grand Prix at the 2019 Skate Canada International. Eighth in the short program with a clean skate, but for a problematic landing on his triple loop, he rose to seventh overall after a sixth-place free skate. He was seventh as well at the 2019 Internationaux de France.

Nadeau placed fifth at the 2020 Canadian Championships.

=== 2020–2021 season ===
Nadeau was assigned to compete at the 2020 Skate Canada International, but the event was cancelled as a result of the coronavirus pandemic.

With the pandemic continuing to make it difficult to hold in-person events, the 2021 Skate Canada Challenge was held virtually, and Nadeau placed sixth. The 2021 Canadian Championships were cancelled.

=== 2022–2023 season ===
On August 25, 2021, Nadeau announced that he would be retiring from singles skating to take up pair skating with partner Emmanuelle Proft. Proft/Nadeau competed only domestically during the 2022–23 season, finishing fifth at the 2023 Canadian Championships.

=== 2023–2024 season ===
Proft/Nadeau made their international debut at the 2023 CS Autumn Classic International, winning the bronze medal. On October 24, 2023, Proft/Nadeau announced their retirement. He currently skates professionally for Royal Caribbean Cruise Line.

== Programs ==
=== With Proft ===
Season	Short program	Free skating	Exhibition
2023–24	Way Down We Go by Kaleo choreo. by Madison Hubbell, Scott Moir, Mylène Girard	Suite Madame Blue by Styx choreo. by Madison Hubbell, Scott Moir, Mylène Girard	I Hear a Symphony by The Supremes performed by Cody Fry choreo. by Stéphanie Valois

=== Single skating ===
Season	Short program	Free skating	Exhibition
2020–2021	Don't Fall in Love by Wake Child choreo. by Mark Pillay	Roadhouse Blues; People Are Strange; Break On Through by The Doors choreo. by Scott Moir	
2019–2020	Don't Fall in Love by Wake Child choreo. by Mark Pillay	Enjoy the Silence; It's No Good; I Feel You; Somebody; Personal Jesus; Just Can't Get Enough by Depeche Mode choreo. by Shae-Lynn Bourne	
2018–2019	A Wink and a Smile (from Sleepless in Seattle soundtrack) by Harry Connick Jr. choreo. by Shae-Lynn Bourne	Enjoy the Silence; It's No Good; I Feel You; Somebody; Personal Jesus; Just Can't Get Enough by Depeche Mode choreo. by Shae-Lynn Bourne	
2017–2018	A Wink and a Smile (from Sleepless in Seattle soundtrack) by Harry Connick Jr. choreo. by Shae-Lynn Bourne	Elvis Presley medley: Also sprach Zarathustra by Richard Strauss; That's All Right by Arthur Crudup; Bridge over Troubled Water by Paul Simon; Blue Suede Shoes by Carl Perkins all performed by Elvis Presley choreo. by Shae-Lynn Bourne	Daniella Denmark Jonathan Roy
2016–2017	For Me, Formidable by Charles Aznavour choreo. by Shae-Lynn Bourne	Elvis Presley medley: Also sprach Zarathustra by Richard Strauss; That's All Right by Arthur Crudup; Bridge over Troubled Water by Paul Simon; Blue Suede Shoes by Carl Perkins all performed by Elvis Presley choreo. by Shae-Lynn Bourne	Je m'voyais déjà by Charles Aznavour
2015–2016	For Me, Formidable by Charles Aznavour choreo. by Shae-Lynn Bourne	Mary Poppins by Robert B. Sherman, Richard M. Sherman; A Spoonful of Sugar; One Man Band; Pavement Artist; Chim Chim Cher-ee; Overture choreo. by Sylvain Bouillere	Je m'voyais déjà by Charles Aznavour
2014–2015	The Puss Suite (from Puss in Boots) by Henry Jackman choreo. by Sylvain Bouillere	Mary Poppins by Robert B. Sherman, Richard M. Sherman; A Spoonful of Sugar; One Man Band; Pavement Artist; Chim Chim Cher-ee; Overture choreo. by Sylvain Bouillere	

== Competitive highlights ==
=== Pairs with Proft ===
International
Event	22–23	23–24
CS Autumn Classic		3rd
National
Canadian Champ.	5th	
SC Challenge	4th	
TBD = Assigned; WD = Withdrew

=== Singles career ===
GP: Grand Prix; CS: Challenger Series; JGP: Junior Grand Prix

International
Event	12–13	13–14	14–15	15–16	16–17	17–18	18–19	19–20	20–21
Four Continents							11th		
GP France							WD	7th	
GP Skate Canada						7th		7th	C
CS Finlandia Trophy							4th		
CS Golden Spin					11th				
CS Nepela Trophy						6th			
CS U.S. Classic								WD	
International: Junior
Junior Worlds			25th	2nd	12th				
JGP Croatia			10th	2nd					
JGP Japan			5th						
JGP Latvia				5th					
Bavarian Open					1st				
National
Canadian Champ.	6th J	4th J	1st J	5th	4th	9th	6th	5th	C
SC Challenge			2nd J.	1st		2nd		4th	6th
TBD = Assigned; WD = Withdrew; C = Event cancelled J = Junior level

== Detailed results ==
Current personal best scores are highlighted in bold.

=== Pairs ===
==== With Proft ====
**2023–2024 season**
Date	Event	SP	FS	Total
September 14–17, 2023	2023 CS Autumn Classic International	3; **58.44**	5; **106.95**	3; **165.39**
**2022–23 season**
Date	Event	SP	FS	Total
January 9–15, 2023	2023 Canadian Championships	6; 57.74	5; 107.07	5; 164.81
Nov. 30 – Dec. 3, 2022	2023 Skate Canada Challenge	3; 60.56	5; 97.91	4; 158.47

==== Senior level ====
Small medals for short and free programs awarded only at ISU Championships.

**2020–2021 season**
Date	Event	SP	FS	Total
January 8–17, 2021	2021 Skate Canada Challenge	6; 79.72	9; 130.36	6; 210.08
**2019–20 season**
Date	Event	SP	FS	Total
January 13–19, 2020	2020 Canadian Championships	6; 73.83	5; 145.27	5; 219.10
November 1–3, 2019	2019 Internationaux de France	9; 69.42	6; 148.26	7; 217.68
October 25–27, 2019	2019 Skate Canada International	8; 75.22	6; 147.11	7; 222.33
**2018–19 season**
Date	Event	SP	FS	Total
February 7–10, 2019	2019 Four Continents Championships	11; 74.44	11; 135.21	11; 209.65
January 14–20, 2019	2019 Canadian National Championships	7; 70.16	4; 153.74	6; 223.90
November 23–25, 2018	2018 Internationaux de France	11; 61.46	WD	WD
October 4–7, 2018	2018 CS Finlandia Trophy	4; 79.17	5; 148.59	4; 227.76
**2017–18 season**
Date	Event	SP	FS	Total
January 8–14, 2018	2018 Canadian Championships	6; 79.56	10; 147.95	9; 227.51
October 27–29, 2017	2017 Skate Canada International	9; 74.23	6; 155.20	7; 229.43
September 21–23, 2017	2017 CS Ondrej Nepela Trophy	8; 66.75	4; 139.22	6; 205.97
