= Thierry Ferland =

Canadian pair skater

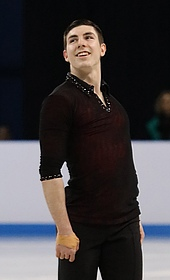

Personal information
- Born: August 3, 1997 (age 29) Quebec City, Quebec, Canada
- Home town: Lévis, Quebec, Canada
- Height: 1.72 m (5 ft 7 1/2 in)

Figure skating career
- Country: Canada
- Discipline: Pair skating
- Partner: Lori-Ann Matte (2010-2023, since 2026); Eliana Secunda (2025-2026)
- Coach: Julie Marcotte; Vanessa James
- Skating club: CPA St. Romuald - St. Jean Levis
- Began skating: 2003

Thierry Ferland (born August 3, 1997) is a Canadian pair skater. With his former partner, Lori-Ann Matte, he is the 2018 Canadian national junior champion and finished within the top ten at two World Junior Championships (2017, 2018).

== Personal life ==
Thierry Ferland was born on August 3, 1997, in Quebec City, Canada. After attending Cégep de Sainte-Foy, he enrolled at Université Laval, where he is studying teaching through distance education.

== Career ==
=== Early years ===
Ferland began learning to skate in 2003. He teamed up with Lori-Ann Matte around 2010. The pair won the novice bronze medal at the 2015 Canadian Championships and the novice silver medal at the 2015 Canada Winter Games. The following season, they moved up to the junior level and placed 6th at the 2016 Canadian Championships.

=== 2016–2017 season ===
Matte/Ferland made their ISU Junior Grand Prix debut in September 2016. After winning the junior silver medal at the 2017 Canadian Championships, they were assigned to the 2017 World Junior Championships in Taipei. The pair ranked 7th in the short program, 12th in the free skate, and 9th overall at the competition in Taiwan. They were coached by Martine Simard in Lévis, Quebec until the end of the season. In May 2017, they relocated to Montréal.

=== 2017–2018 season ===
The pair lost several weeks of training after Matte broke her elbow in the autumn of 2017. In January, Matte/Ferland won the junior pairs' title at the 2018 Canadian Championships. They placed 10th in the short program, 7th in the free skate, and 9th overall at the 2018 World Junior Championships, which took place in March in Sofia, Bulgaria. Richard Gauthier and Bruno Marcotte coached the pair in Montréal.

=== 2018–2019 season ===
Making their senior international debut, Matte/Ferland placed fifth at the 2018 CS Autumn Classic International in September. They were fourth at the 2020 Canadian Championships.

=== 2019–2020 season ===
Competing at two Challenger events to begin the season, Matte/Ferland were eight at the 2019 CS U.S. Classic and seventh at the 2019 CS Warsaw Cup. They placed fifth at the 2020 Canadian Championships.

=== 2020–2021 season ===
Matte/Ferland were assigned to make their Grand Prix debut at the 2020 Skate Canada International, but the event was cancelled as a result of the coronavirus pandemic. They made their competitive debut at the 2021 Skate Canada Challenge, the qualifying event for the national championships, winning the silver medal.

Matte/Ferland were named as alternates to the 2021 World Championships. With Canada's mandatory two-week quarantine for returning athletes; however, no member of the World team was assigned to the 2021 World Team Trophy, and they assigned as Canada's entry in the pairs segment. They finished sixth in both the short and free programs, while Team Canada finished in sixth place overall.

=== 2021–2022 season ===
Matte/Ferland made their competitive debut at the 2021 CS Autumn Classic International, where they placed seventh. Making their Grand Prix debut, they were seventh as well at the 2021 Skate Canada International. They placed fourth at the 2022 Canadian Championships. Assigned to compete at the 2022 Four Continents Championships, they finished sixth.

=== 2022–2023 season ===
The team began the season with a seventh-place finish at the 2022 CS U.S. Classic. Matte and Ferland were scheduled to compete on the Grand Prix at the 2022 MK John Wilson Trophy, but had to withdraw due to injury.

=== 2023–24 season ===
Though no official announcement about their split happened, in August, Ferland was on the entry list for a Canadian domestic competition, Souvenir Georges-Ethier, with new partner, Gabriella Izzo. Izzo announced in an interview that she and Ferland would be representing Canada. The partnership was short-lived, however, as in November, Izzo announced her retirement from competitive skating.

=== 2025–26 season ===
In May 2025, it was announced that Ferland had teamed up with American-born pairs skater, Eliana Secunda, to compete for Canada.

The team debuted at the 2025 Skate Canada Challenge, where they won the silver medal. In January, Secunda/Ferland finished seventh at the 2026 Canadian Championships.

== Programs ==
(with Secunda)

Season	Short program	Free skating
2025–2026	Maybe by Janis Joplin choreo. by Julie Marcotte	Desert by Cirque du Soleil choreo. by Julie Marcotte

(with Matte)

Season	Short program	Free skating
2021–2022	6's to 9 by Big Wild choreo. by Julie Marcotte	Waves by Dean Lewis choreo. by Julie Marcotte
2020–2021	Awoo by Sofi Tukker choreo. by Julie Marcotte	Waves by Dean Lewis choreo. by Julie Marcotte
2018–2019	Down the Road by C2C; Happy by C2C, Derek Martin choreo. by Julie Marcotte	Ameksa (District 78 Remix) performed by Taalbi Brothers; Sendero performed by Compania Talent Danza choreo. by Julie Marcotte
2017–2018	Down the Road by C2C; Happy by C2C, Derek Martin choreo. by Julie Marcotte	The Scientist by Guy Berryman, Jonny Buckland, Will Champion, Chris Martin choreo. by Julie Marcotte
2016–2017	Too Darn Hot by Cole Porter choreo. by Marc-Olivier Bossé	Life Is Beautiful by Nicola Piovani; Barcarolle; Grand Hotel Valse; Il gioco di Giosuè choreo. by Milena Todaro
2015–2016	Too Darn Hot by Cole Porter choreo. by Marc-Olivier Bossé	Dream On performed by Glee cast choreo. by Julie Marcotte

== Competitive highlights ==
GP: Grand Prix; CS: Challenger Series; JGP: Junior Grand Prix

=== Pair skating with Eliana Secunda ===
Competition placements at senior level
Season	2025–26
Canadian Championships	7th
Skate Canada Challenge	2nd

=== Pair skating with Lori-Ann Matte ===
International
Event	15–16	16–17	17–18	18–19	19–20	20–21	21–22	22–23
Four Continents							6th	
GP Skate Canada						C	7th	
CS Autumn Classic				5th			7th	
CS U.S. Classic					8th			7th
CS Warsaw Cup					7th		10th	
International: Junior
Junior Worlds		9th	9th					
JGP Belarus			8th					
JGP Czech Rep.		6th						
JGP Poland			12th					
JGP Russia		4th						
Bavarian Open		2nd						
National
Canadian Champ.	6th J	2nd J	1st J	4th	5th	C	4th	WD
Skate Canada Challenge	2nd J	2nd J	1st J	2nd		2nd	2nd	
Team events
World Team Trophy						6th T 6th P		
TBD = Assigned; WD = Withdrew; C = Event cancelled Levels: P = Pre-novice; N = Novice; J = Junior; T = Team result; P = Personal result. Medals awarded for team result only.

=== Men's singles ===
National
Event	15–16
Canadian Champ.	14th J
Skate Canada Challenge	11th J
J = Junior
