= 2017 Canadian Figure Skating Championships =

Figure skating competition

2017 Canadian Skating Championships
- Type: National Championship
- Date: January 16 – 22
- Season: 2016–17
- Location: Ottawa, Ontario
- Host: Skate Canada
- Venue: TD Place Arena

Champions
- Men's singles: Patrick Chan (S); Stephen Gogolev (J); Corey Circelli (N)
- Ladies' singles: Kaetlyn Osmond (S); Aurora Cotop (J); Catherine Carle (N)
- Pairs: Megan Duhamel / Eric Radford (S); Evelyn Walsh / Trennt Michaud (J); Chloé Panetta / Steven Lapointe (N)
- Ice dance: Tessa Virtue / Scott Moir (S); Marjorie Lajoie / Zachary Lagha (J); Natalie D'Alessandro / Bruce Waddell (N)
- Previous: 2016 Canadian Championships
- Next: 2018 Canadian Championships

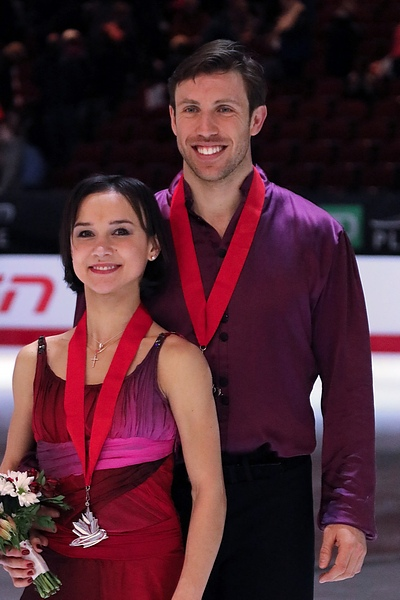
Dylan Moscovitch and Liubov Ilyushechkina at the 2017 Canadian Figure Skating Championships.

The 2017 Canadian Tire National Skating Championships was held January 16–22, 2017 in Ottawa, Ontario. It was organized by Skate Canada and sponsored by Canadian Tire. The event determined the national champions of Canada. Medals were awarded in the disciplines of men's singles, women's singles, pair skating, and ice dancing on the senior, junior, and novice levels. Although the official International Skating Union terminology for female skaters in the singles category is ladies, Skate Canada uses women officially. The results of this competition were among the selection criteria for the 2017 World Championships, the 2017 Four Continents Championships, and the 2017 World Junior Championships.

== Medal summary ==
=== Senior ===
Discipline	Gold	Silver	Bronze
Men	Patrick Chan	Kevin Reynolds	Nam Nguyen
Women	Kaetlyn Osmond	Gabrielle Daleman	Alaine Chartrand
Pairs	Meagan Duhamel / Eric Radford	Liubov Ilyushechkina / Dylan Moscovitch	Kirsten Moore-Towers / Michael Marinaro
Ice dancing	Tessa Virtue / Scott Moir	Kaitlyn Weaver / Andrew Poje	Piper Gilles / Paul Poirier

=== Junior ===
Discipline	Gold	Silver	Bronze
Men	Stephen Gogolev	Conrad Orzel	Samuel Turcotte
Women	Aurora Cotop	Emily Bausback	Alison Schumacher
Pairs	Evelyn Walsh / Trennt Michaud	Lori-Ann Matte / Thierry Ferland	Olivia Boys-Eddy / Mackenzie Boys-Eddy
Ice dancing	Marjorie Lajoie / Zachary Lagha	Ashlynne Stairs / Lee Royer	Danielle Wu / Nik Mirzakhani

=== Novice ===
Discipline	Gold	Silver	Bronze
Men	Corey Circelli	Dawson Nodwell	Alistair Lam
Women	Catherine Carle	Emma Bulawka	Élodie Adsuar
Pairs	Chloé Panetta / Steven Lapointe	Patricia Andrew / Paxton Knott	Takara Dei / Josh Venema
Ice dancing	Natalie D'Alessandro / Bruce Waddell	Jade McCue / Gabriel Clemente	Jessica-Lee Behiel / Jackson Behiel

== Senior results ==
=== Men ===
Rank	Name	Section	Total points	SP		FS	
1	Patrick Chan	CO	296.86	1	91.50	1	205.36
2	Kevin Reynolds	BC/YK	255.77	2	81.76	2	174.01
3	Nam Nguyen	CO	240.60	4	76.08	4	164.52
4	Nicolas Nadeau	QC	238.22	5	72.82	3	165.40
5	Keegan Messing	AB/NT/NU	231.04	8	72.09	5	158.95
6	Elladj Baldé	QC	227.16	3	77.45	6	149.71
7	Liam Firus	BC/YK	213.39	6	72.41	7	140.98
8	Bennet Toman	CO	203.91	11	68.14	8	135.77
9	Roman Sadovsky	CO	202.96	7	72.38	10	130.58
10	Mitchell Gordon	BC/YK	201.09	9	70.48	9	130.61
11	Joseph Phan	QC	196.78	12	66.51	11	130.27
12	Edrian Paul Celestino	QC	194.90	10	69.41	12	125.49
13	Samuel Morais	QC	179.70	15	59.78	13	119.92
14	Jack Kermezian	QC	171.46	13	61.78	16	109.68
15	Alexander Lawrence	BC/YK	169.40	18	58.05	14	111.35
16	Shaquille Davis	CO	168.80	16	58.31	15	110.49
17	Laurent Guay	QC	168.62	14	60.16	17	108.46
18	Antony Cheng	BC/YK	166.58	17	58.21	18	108.37
19	Olivier Bergeron	QC	160.63	19	54.35	19	106.28
20	Dustin Sherriff-Clayton	AB/NT/NU	149.65	20	51.13	20	98.52
21	Dominic Rondeau	QC	138.63	21	46.87	21	91.76

=== Women ===
Rank	Name	Section	Total points	SP		FS	
1	Kaetlyn Osmond	AB/NT/NU	219.66	1	81.01	1	138.65
2	Gabrielle Daleman	CO	211.09	2	75.04	2	136.05
3	Alaine Chartrand	EO	182.07	3	67.41	3	114.66
4	Larkyn Austman	BC/YK	166.13	5	58.72	4	107.41
5	Sarah Tamura	BC/YK	162.12	4	60.09	6	102.03
6	Kim Decelles	QC	160.31	6	56.06	5	104.25
7	Alicia Pineault	QC	153.20	8	51.33	7	101.87
8	Megan Yim	BC/YK	151.39	9	50.75	8	100.64
9	Michelle Long	CO	147.30	7	54.45	10	92.85
10	Emy Decelles	QC	142.24	11	48.80	9	93.44
11	Valérie Bergeron	QC	131.15	13	43.97	11	87.18
12	Maya Lappin	CO	130.97	10	49.06	16	81.91
13	Kim Deguise-Léveillé	QC	128.19	15	43.13	15	85.06
14	Jane Gray	AB/NT/NU	127.86	16	42.73	14	85.13
15	Emma Cullen	EO	127.76	17	41.33	12	86.43
16	Rachel LaFleche	WO	126.44	18	40.44	13	86.00
17	Veronique Cloutier	NO	114.35	12	46.26	17	68.09
18	Michelle Lifshits	CO	109.80	14	43.35	18	66.45

=== Pairs ===
Rank	Name	Section	Total points	SP		FS	
1	Meagan Duhamel / Eric Radford	QC	227.23	1	80.72	1	146.51
2	Liubov Ilyushechkina / Dylan Moscovitch	CO	208.24	2	72.19	2	136.05
3	Kirsten Moore-Towers / Michael Marinaro	WO	198.74	3	70.69	3	128.05
4	Brittany Jones / Joshua Reagan	WO	162.80	5	59.88	5	102.92
5	Camille Ruest / Andrew Wolfe	QC	156.75	4	64.58	6	92.17
6	Sydney Kolodziej / Maxime Deschamps	QC	154.65	6	49,57	4	105.08
7	Angelina Ekaterinina / Sebastian Arcieri	WO	125.90	7	43.93	7	81.97
WD	Julianne Séguin / Charlie Bilodeau	QC					

=== Ice dance ===
Rank	Name	Section	Total points	SP		FS	
1	Tessa Virtue / Scott Moir	QC	203.45	1	84.36	1	119.09
2	Kaitlyn Weaver / Andrew Poje	NO	192.90	2	78.92	2	113.98
3	Piper Gilles / Paul Poirier	CO	189.89	3	78.15	3	111.74
4	Carolane Soucisse / Shane Firus	QC	159.27	4	62.50	4	96.77
5	Haley Sales / Nikolas Wamsteeker	BC/YK	151.63	5	60.26	5	91.37
6	Sarah Arnold / Thomas Williams	BC/YK	145.55	6	56.66	6	88.89
7	Mira Samoisette / Dominic Barthe	QC	132.09	7	55.34	7	76.75
8	Elysia-Marie Campbell / Philippe Granger	QC	119.23	8	48.10	8	71.13
9	Vanessa Chartrand / Alexander Seidel	QC	114.17	9	45.78	9	68.39

== Junior results ==
=== Men ===
Rank	Name	Section	Total points	SP		FS	
1	Stephen Gogolev	CO	210.06	2	67.18	1	142.88
2	Conrad Orzel	CO	206.06	1	68.16	2	137.90
3	Samuel Turcotte	QC	165.19	3	61.56	4	103.63
4	Jack Dushenski	CO	157.26	4	59.59	8	97.67
5	Iliya Kovler	CO	154.16	10	50.17	3	103.99
6	Graham Schaufele	AB/NT/NU	151.53	8	52.26	7	99.27
7	Brian Le	BC/YK	151.14	9	50.91	6	100.23
8	Josh Allen	EO	147.63	17	44.25	5	103.38
9	Zachary Daleman	CO	145.37	12	48.40	9	96.97
10	James Henri-Singh	QC	139.86	5	53.65	12	86.21
11	Bruce Waddell	CO	137.15	15	47.44	10	89.71
12	Jérémie Crevaux	QC	135.51	14	47.83	11	87.68
13	Zoé Duval-Yergeau	QC	131.01	13	48.24	14	82.77
14	Justin Brandon Ng-Siva	CO	130.20	16	45.25	13	84.95
15	Matthew Markell	EO	129.82	11	49.13	15	80.69
16	Brandon Day	QC	112.32	7	52.82	17	59.50
17	Pier-Alexandre Hudon	QC	106.30	18	35.16	16	71.14
WD	Eric Liu	AB/NT/NU		6	53.53		

=== Women ===
Rank	Name	Section	Total points	SP		FS	
1	Aurora Cotop	CO	163.11	1	59.55	1	103.56
2	Emily Bausback	BC/YK	151.52	2	53.62	3	97.90
3	Alison Schumacher	WO	150.17	5	49,42	2	100.75
4	Triena Robinson	AB/NT/NU	139.25	3	51.72	4	87.53
5	Amanda Tobin	WO	137.03	4	49.72	5	87.31
6	Lissa Anne McGaghey	NB	132.76	10	45.58	6	87.18
7	Hélène Carle	CO	130.87	7	47.32	7	83.55
8	Hannah Dawson	EO	128.25	11	45.54	8	82.71
9	Aislinn Ganci	AB/NT/NU	125.93	12	44.60	9	81.33
10	Olivia Gran	BC/YK	124.42	6	48.91	12	75.51
11	Mckenna Colthorp	BC/YK	121.41	9	45.85	11	75.56
12	Evelyn Walsh	WO	121.07	8	46.56	13	74.51
13	Sarah-Maude Blanchard	QC	119.83	14	40.21	10	79.62
14	Sophie Larouche	QC	107.09	13	41.99	15	65.10
15	Natalie D'Alessandro	CO	104.47	17	37.05	14	67.42
16	Victoria Bocknek	CO	99.17	16	38.72	17	60.45
17	Semi Won	CO	97.27	18	35.55	16	61.72
18	Jennyfer Richer-Labelle	QC	91.24	15	39.62	18	51.62

=== Pairs ===
Rank	Name	Section	Total points	SP		FS	
1	Evelyn Walsh / Trennt Michaud	EO	155.73	1	56.22	1	99.51
2	Lori-Ann Matte / Thierry Ferland	QC	141.33	2	54.48	2	86.85
3	Olivia Boys-Eddy / Mackenzie Boys-Eddy	CO	122.53	3	47.89	4	74.64
4	Tessa Jones / Matthew den Boer	BC/YK	122.14	4	45.15	3	76.99
5	Jamie Knoblauch / Cody Wong	WO	118.98	5	45.07	5	73.91
WD	Hannah Dawson / Christian Reekie	EO					
WD	Justine Brasseur / Mathieu Ostiguy	QC					

=== Ice dance ===
Rank	Name	Section	Total points	SD		FD	
1	Marjorie Lajoie / Zachary Lagha	QC	153.55	1	61.62	1	91.93
2	Ashlynne Stairs / Lee Royer	BC/YK	139.63	2	56.19	2	83.44
3	Danielle Wu / Nik Mirzakhani	BC/YK	133.98	4	52.48	3	81.50
4	Valerie Taillefer / Jason Chan	QC	127.53	3	54.10	5	73.43
5	Alicia Fabbri / Claudio Pietrantonio	QC	126.04	7	48.46	4	77.58
6	Irina Galiyanova / Tommy Tang	CO	120.62	6	48.89	6	71.73
7	Sabrina Bédard / George Waddell	QC	114.35	11	46.38	7	67.97
8	Olivia Han / Grayson Lochhead	WO	112.08	5	49.12	8	62.96
9	Keelee Gingrich / Parker Brown	CO	110.21	8	48.24	11	61.97
10	Gina Cipriano / Jake Richardson	QC	108.71	9	47.30	12	61.41
11	Ravie Cunningham / Cedar Bridgewood	BC/YK	107.13	12	44.66	10	62.47
12	Yohanna Broker / Matthew Korkoian	WO	100.53	13	37.96	9	62.57
13	Priya Ramesh / Brandon Labelle	CO	94.43	14	33.93	13	60.50
14	Jolie Che / Paul Ayer	AB/NT/NU	87.98	10	47.23	15	40.75
15	Kaitlyn Chubb / Alex Gunther	EO	83.16	15	31.79	14	51.37

== Novice results ==
=== Men ===
Rank	Name	Section	Total points	SP		FS	
1	Corey Circelli	CO	139.27	2	42.72	1	96.55
2	Dawson Nodwell	AB/NT/NU	132.67	4	41.93	2	90.74
3	Alistair Lam	WO	127.75	1	43.91	3	83.84
4	Koen Kucher	SK	124.61	5	40.96	4	83.65
5	Beres Clements	BC/YK	124.50	3	42.52	5	81.98
6	Aleksa Rakic	BC/YK	119.77	6	40.71	6	79.06
7	Max Denk	CO	112.44	13	37.37	7	75.07
8	Daniel Rousskikh	EO	110.98	7	40.10	8	70.88
9	Alec Guinzbourg	EO	108.20	8	38.83	11	69.37
10	Loucas Éthier	QC	107.56	11	37.62	9	69.94
11	Hugo Li	CO	105.16	9	38.61	13	66.55
12	Yu Jin Armstrong	AB/NT/NU	104.95	14	36.93	12	68.02
13	David Birinberg	EO	101.42	17	31.65	10	69.77
14	Justin Hampole	BC/YK	99.22	10	38.10	15	61.12
15	Alexis Lay	QC	95.67	16	32.40	14	63.27
16	Alexandre Simard	QC	93.43	12	37.61	17	55.82
17	Bryan Pierro	QC	91.92	15	32.66	16	59.26
18	Evan Hopkins	EO	77.67	18	24.55	18	53.12

=== Women ===
Rank	Name	Section	Total points	SP		FS	
1	Catherine Carle	CO	133.73	1	41.88	1	91.85
2	Emma Bulawka	BC/YK	122.68	6	38.02	2	84.66
3	Élodie Adsuar	QC	119.96	3	41.38	4	78.58
4	Noémie Morin	QC	117.80	2	41.62	5	76.18
5	Natalie Walker	CO	117.31	5	38.30	3	79.01
6	Katrine Denis	QC	112.86	4	38.41	7	74.45
7	Rosalie Vincent	QC	111.72	11	35.69	6	76.03
8	Jolie Chiem	AB/NT/NU	105.00	10	37.43	9	67.57
9	Leah Lee	BC/YK	104.73	8	37.74	10	66.99
10	Heidi Pelchat	QC	104.18	7	37.91	11	66.27
11	Sandrine Bouchard	QC	102.48	16	33.57	8	68.91
12	Samira D'Auteuil	QC	100.71	9	37.57	14	63.14
13	Alanna Liu	SK	100.20	12	35.34	12	64.86
14	Samantha Couillard	QC	98.67	14	35.01	13	63.66
15	Lilika Zheng	CO	92.54	13	35.09	16	57.45
16	Amelia Orzel	CO	88.14	17	31.72	17	56.42
17	Charlotte Rannou	QC	87.64	18	25.65	15	61.99
18	Jade Apréa-Ricard	QC	81.04	15	34.60	18	46.44

=== Pairs ===
Rank	Name	Section	Total points	SP		FS	
1	Chloé Panetta / Steven Lapointe	QC	113.42	1	41.91	1	71.51
2	Patricia Andrew / Paxton Knott	WO	92.91	3	31.54	2	61.37
3	Takara Dei / Josh Venem	AB/NT/NU	91.34	2	34.34	3	57.00
4	Keara Harney / Zachary Freedman	QC	75.01	4	28.93	4	46.08
5	Danika Levesque / Samir Andjorin	QC	67.41	5	26.89	5	40.52

=== Ice dance ===
Rank	Name	Section	Total points	PD1		PD2		FD	
1	Natalie D'Alessandro / Bruce Waddell	CO	90.49	2	13.60	2	12.35	1	64.54
2	Jade McCue / Gabriel Clemente	CO	84.28	4	12.88	1	14.44	5	56.96
3	Jessica-Lee Behiel / Jackson Behiel	AB/NT/NU	83.20	3	13.37	9	9.99	3	59.84
4	Katerina Kasatkin / Corey Circelli	CO	81.44	7	10.83	6	10.50	2	60.11
5	Nina Mizuki / Veniamins Volskis	BC/YK	79.56	9	10.76	5	10.54	4	58.26
6	Bridget Le Donne / Jakub Smal	WO	76.44	5	12.83	10	9.84	7	53.77
7	Charlotte Lafond-Fournier / Anthony Campanel	QC	75.63	12	10.33	7	10.44	6	54.86
8	Sophia Strachan / Everest Zhu	WO	73.29	1	14.06	3	11.34	13	47.89
9	Jessica Li / Jacob Richmond	QC	72.48	14	9.80	4	10.84	8	51.84
10	Emily Mikulcik / Malcolm Kowan	AB/NT/NU	69.74	11	10.55	8	9.99	9	49.20
11	Olivia McIsaac / Liam MacDonald	WO	68.87	6	11.62	11	9.17	10	48.08
12	Lily Hensen / Nathan Lickers	WO	67.39	10	10.76	13	8.56	11	48.07
13	Pearl Kang / Cael Elford	AB/NT/NU	66.05	15	9.76	14	8.38	12	47.91
14	Théadora Sauvé / Alexandre Faucher	QC	62.38	13	10.22	12	8.58	15	43.58
15	Katrine Roy / Olivier Poupart	QC	61.57	8	10.81	15	7.05	14	43.71

== International team selections ==
=== World Championships ===
The team for the 2017 World Championships was announced on January 22, 2017.

	Men	Women	Pairs	Ice dance
1	Patrick Chan	Kaetlyn Osmond	Meagan Duhamel / Eric Radford	Tessa Virtue / Scott Moir
2	Kevin Reynolds	Gabrielle Daleman	Liubov Ilyushechkina / Dylan Moscovitch	Kaitlyn Weaver / Andrew Poje
3			Julianne Séguin / Charlie Bilodeau	Piper Gilles / Paul Poirier

=== Four Continents Championships ===
The team for the 2017 Four Continents Championships was announced on January 22, 2017.

	Men	Women	Pairs	Ice dance
1	Patrick Chan	Kaetlyn Osmond	Meagan Duhamel / Eric Radford	Tessa Virtue / Scott Moir
2	Kevin Reynolds	Gabrielle Daleman	Liubov Ilyushechkina / Dylan Moscovitch	Kaitlyn Weaver / Andrew Poje
3	Nam Nguyen	Alaine Chartrand	Kirsten Moore-Towers / Michael Marinaro	Piper Gilles / Paul Poirier

=== World Junior Championships ===
The team for the 2017 World Junior Championships was announced on January 22, 2017.

	Men	Women	Pairs	Ice dance
1	Nicolas Nadeau	Sarah Tamura	Evelyn Walsh / Trennt Michaud	Marjorie Lajoie / Zachary Lagha
2	Roman Sadovsky		Lori-Ann Matte / Thierry Ferland	Ashlynne Stairs / Lee Royer
3	Conrad Orzel			
