= Aurora Cotop =

Canadian figure skater

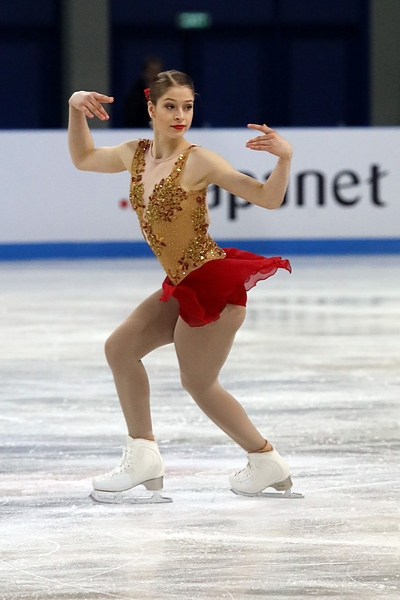
- Aurora Cotop at the Junior Worlds in 2018

Personal information
- Born: July 13, 2002 (age 24) Toronto, Ontario, Canada
- Height: 1.64 m (5 ft 4 1/2 in)

Figure skating career
- Country: Canada
- Coach: Ravi Walia
- Skating club: Ice Palace FSC
- Began skating: 2005
- Retired: 2022

Aurora Cotop (born July 13, 2002) is a retired Canadian figure skater. She is the 2019 Bavarian Open bronze medalist and 2019 Canadian national silver medalist. Earlier in her career, she won the junior ladies' title at the 2017 Canadian Championships and competed in the final segment at the 2018 World Junior Championships.

== Personal life ==
Cotop was born on July 13, 2002, in Toronto, Ontario, Canada. She is of Romanian descent.

== Career ==
=== Early years ===
Cotop began learning to skate in 2005. She won the novice ladies' title at the 2016 Canadian Championships and the junior ladies' title the following year, at the 2017 Canadian Championships.

=== 2017–2018 season ===
Cotop made her ISU Junior Grand Prix (JGP) debut in August, placing seventh in Brisbane, Australia. In October, she finished ninth at her second JGP assignment, in Gdańsk, Poland. Competing in the senior ranks, she won gold at the Skate Canada Challenge in December. As a result, she qualified to compete on the same level at the 2018 Canadian Championships, where she would place fifth.

She was then selected to represent Canada at the 2018 World Junior Championships in Sofia. In Bulgaria, she qualified to the free skate by placing twenty-first in the short program and went on to finish seventeenth overall. Following this, Cotop decided to move to Edmonton to train with Ravi Walia, the coach of Olympic and World medalist Kaetlyn Osmond.

=== 2018–2019 season ===
Cotop's move to Edmonton was complicated by a pelvic fracture and bone marrow edema which limited her jump content. She placed eleventh at her lone JGP assignment, the 2018 JGP Slovenia, and subsequently withdrew from what would have been her senior debut on the ISU Challenger Series. In December 2018, Cotop finished fourth at the Skate Canada Challenge.

In January, she won silver at the 2019 Canadian Championships after placing sixth in the short program and second in the free skate. Cotop praised her new coach Walia, and said her free skate that it was "one of my best programs, because my run-throughs weren’t as good, so I feel like I sort of rose to the occasion." Despite finishing in second place, Cotop lacked the senior technical minimums required to compete at the remaining senior ISU Championships for the season. Skate Canada subsequently assigned her to the Bavarian Open, in the hopes of obtaining them. She won the bronze medal at the Bavarian Open, placing third in both segments, and obtaining the necessary technical minimum scores. Cotop called the result "pretty good", but said she still needed to work on integrated more triple jumps into her program, in particular the Lutz.

On February 22, Skate Canada formally assigned Cotop to the Canadian team for the 2019 World Championships in Saitama, Japan.

=== 2019–2020 season ===
After placing first in her domestic summer competition, complications from a groin tendon injury forced Cotop to withdraw from her initial planned Challenger assignment, the Nebelhorn Trophy, as well as the 2019 Skate Canada International.

While recovering from her groin injury, Cotop began to experience serious back pain. She attempted to compete at the 2020 Canadian Championships, but withdrew after placing twelfth in the short program.

== Programs ==
Season	Short program	Free skating	Exhibition
2019–2020	Moonlight Sonata by Ludwig van Beethoven choreo. by Lance Vipond	Romeo and Juliet Fantasy Overture by Pyotr Ilyich Tchaikovsky; Dance of the Knights (from Romeo and Juliet) by Sergei Prokofiev; Love Theme (from Romeo and Juliet) by Nino Rota choreo. by Lance Vipond	Tainted Love by Ed Cobb choreo. by Lance Vipond
2018–2019	Arrival of the Birds by The Cinematic Orchestra; Blackbird by The Beatles performed by Sara Niemietz choreo. by Myke Gillman	W.E. by Abel Korzeniowski; Evgeni's Waltz; Revolving Doors; Letters choreo. by Myke Gillman	
2017–2018	Habanera (from Carmen) by Georges Bizet choreo. by Myke Gillman	Clair de lune (from Suite bergamasque) by Claude Debussy choreo. by Myke Gillman	Get the Party Started by Pink

== Competitive highlights ==
GP: Grand Prix; CS: Challenger Series; JGP: Junior Grand Prix

International
Event	16–17	17–18	18–19
Worlds			35th
Bavarian Open			3rd
International: Junior
Junior Worlds		17th	
JGP Australia		7th	
JGP Poland		9th	
JGP Slovenia			11th
Autumn Classic	1st		
Bavarian Open	4th		
National
Canadian Champ.	1st J	5th	2nd
Levels: N = Novice; J = Junior; TBD = Assigned; WD = Withdrew

== Detailed results ==
=== Senior level ===
2019–20 season
Date	Event	SP	FS	Total
January 13–19, 2019	2020 Canadian Championships	12; 49.42	WD —	WD —

=== Junior level ===
2018–19 season
Date	Event	Level	SP	FS	Total
March 18–24, 2019	2019 World Championships	Senior	35; 48.83	—	35; 48.83
January 16–22, 2019	2019 Bavarian Open	Senior	3; 55.52	3; 107.04	3; 162.56
January 13–20, 2019	2019 Canadian Championships	Senior	6; 58.98	2; 110.37	2; 169.35
October 3–6, 2018	2018 Junior Grand Prix in Slovenia	Junior	11; 46.30	12; 87.95	11; 134.25
2017–18 season
Date	Event	Level	SP	FS	Total
March 5–11, 2018	2018 World Junior Championships	Junior	21; 49.15	17; 92.49	17; 141.64
January 8–14, 2018	2018 Canadian Championships	Senior	14; 48.83	5; 108.06	5; 156.89
October 13–16, 2017	2017 Junior Grand Prix in Poland	Junior	8; 48.70	12; 84.94	9; 133.64
September 23–26, 2017	2017 Junior Grand Prix in Australia	Junior	9; 43.39	6; 96.75	7; 140.14
2016–17 season
Date	Event	Level	SP	FS	Total
February 14–19, 2017	2017 Bavarian Open	Junior	3; 54.15	4; 91.85	4; 146.00
January 16–22, 2017	2017 Canadian Junior Championships	Junior	1; 59.55	1; 103.56	1; 163.11
September 29 – October 1, 2016	2017 Bavarian Open	Junior	3; 47.06	1; 92.50	1; 139.56
