= Skate Canada Challenge =

Annual skating competition hosted in Canada

The Skate Canada Challenge is an annual domestic figure skating competition hosted by Skate Canada. It is typically held in November or December with the location differing by year. Medals may be awarded in men's singles, women's singles, ice dance, and pair skating at the senior, junior, and novice. The results of the Skate Canada Challenge are used to determine entries for the Canadian Championships.

== Senior results ==
=== Men's singles ===
Year	Location	Gold	Silver	Bronze	Ref.
2008	Mississauga	Fedor Andreev	Jeremy Ten	Christopher Mabee	
2009	Mississauga	Fedor Andreev	Joey Russell	Ken Rose	
2010	Mississauga	Joey Russell	Ian Martinez	Louis-Philippe Sirois	
2011	Mississauga	Ian Martinez	Alexandra Najarro	Adriana DeSanctis	
2012	Regina	Jeremy Ten	Marc-André Craig	Joey Russell	
2013	Regina	Elladj Baldé	Mitchell Gordon	Garrett Gosselin	
2014	Regina	Andrei Rogozine	Liam Firus	Nam Nguyen	
2015	Pierrefonds	Nam Nguyen	Mitchell Gordon	Keegan Messing	
2016	Edmonton	Nicolas Nadeau	Kevin Reynolds	Keegan Messing	
2017	Pierrefonds	Joseph Phan	Bennet Toman	Mitchell Gordon	
2018	Pierrefonds	Joseph Phan	Nicolas Nadeau	Nam Nguyen	
2019	Edmonton	Nam Nguyen	Bennet Toman	Conrad Orzel	
2020	Edmonton	Nam Nguyen	Eric Liu	Joseph Phan	
2021	Virtual	Roman Sadovsky	Nam Nguyen	Corey Circelli	
2022	Regina	Stephen Gogolev	Aleksa Rakic	Corey Circelli	
2023	Winnipeg	Matthew Newnham	Wesley Chiu	Matthew Markell	
2024	Winnipeg	Conrad Orzel	Aleksa Rakic	Matthew Newnham	
2025	Winnipeg	Aleksa Rakic	Anthony Paradis	Roman Sadovsky	
2026	Calgary	Wesley Chiu	Keegan Messing	Aleksa Rakic	

=== Women's singles ===
Year	Location	Gold	Silver	Bronze	Ref.
2008	Mississauga	Amélie Lacoste	Cynthia Phaneuf	Diane Szmiett	
2009	Mississauga	Kathryn Kang	Vanessa Grenier	Erin Scherrer	
2010	Mississauga	Myriane Samson	Kate Charbonneau	Erin Scherrer	
2011	Mississauga	Vanessa Grenier	Alexandra Najarro	Adriana DeSanctis	
2012	Regina	Kaetlyn Osmond	Alexandra Gagnon	Alaine Chartrand	
2013	Regina	Kaetlyn Osmond	Julianne Séguin	Gabrielle Daleman	
2014	Regina	Kaetlyn Osmond	Gabrielle Daleman	Veronik Mallet	
2015	Pierrefonds	Kim DeGuise Léveillée	Roxanne Rheault	Madelyn Dunley	
2016	Edmonton	Gabrielle Daleman	Véronik Mallet	Larkyn Austman	
2017	Pierrefonds	Gabrielle Daleman	Sarah Tamura	Alicia Pineault	
2018	Pierrefonds	Aurora Cotop	Michelle Long	Alicia Pineault	
2019	Edmonton	Larkyn Austman	Alison Schumacher	Michelle Long	
2020	Edmonton	Madeline Schizas	Aurora Cotop	Michelle Long	
2021	Virtual	Madeline Schizas	Alison Schumacher	Gabrielle Daleman	
2022	Regina	Gabrielle Daleman	Amanda Tobin	Véronik Mallet	
2023	Winnipeg	Fiona Bombardier	Amy Shao Ning Yang	Sara-Maude Dupuis	
2024	Winnipeg	Fée-Ann Landry	Kaiya Ruiter	Hetty Shi	
2025	Winnipeg	Amy Shao Ning Yang	Uliana Shiryaeva	Kara Yun	
2026	Calgary	Gabrielle Daleman	Uliana Shiryaeva	Megan Woodley	

=== Pairs ===
Year	Location	Gold	Silver	Bronze	Ref.
2008	Mississauga	Megan Duhamel; Craig Buntin	Kyra Moscovitch; Dylan Moscovitch	Mylène Brodeur; John Mattatall	
2009	Mississauga	Brooke Paulin; Brian Shales	Paige Lawrence; Rudi Swiegers	Taylor Steele; Christopher Richardson	
2010	Mississauga	Mylène Brodeur; John Mattatall	Paige Lawrence; Rudi Swiegers	Brittany Jones; Kurtis Gaskell	
2011	Mississauga	Megan Duhamel; Eric Radford	Margaret Purdy; Michael Marinaro	Noemie Arseneault; Simon-Pierre Côté	
2012	Regina	Paige Lawrence; Rudi Swiegers	Julianne Séguin; Andrew Evans	Margaret Purdy; Michael Marinaro	
2013	Regina	Taylor Steele; Simon-Pierre Côté	No other competitors		
2014	Regina	Natasha Purich; Mervin Tran	Brittany Jones; Kurtis Gaskell	Shalena Rau; Rob Schultz	
2015	Pierrefonds	Liubov Ilyushechkina; Dylan Moscovitch	Kirsten Moore-Towers; Michael Marinaro	Natasha Purich; Drew Wolfe	
2016	Edmonton	Vanessa Grenier; Maxime Deschamps	Brittany Jones; Joshua Reagan	Shalena Rau; Sebastian Arcieri	
2017	Pierrefonds	Kirsten Moore-Towers; Michael Marinaro	Brittany Jones; Joshua Reagan	Camille Ruest; Andrew Wolfe	
2018	Pierrefonds	Julianne Seguin; Charlie Bilodeau	Evelyn Walsh; Trennt Michaud	Sydney Kolodziej; Maxime Deschamps	
2019	Edmonton	Evelyn Walsh; Trennt Michaud	Lori-Ann Matte; Thierry Ferland	Mariah Mccaw; Steven Adcock	
2020	Edmonton	Evelyn Walsh; Trennt Michaud	Justine Brasseur; Mark Bardei	Deanna Stellato; Maxime Deschamps	
2021	Virtual	Kirsten Moore-Towers; Michael Marinaro	Lori-Ann Matte; Thierry Ferland	Deanna Stellato; Maxime Deschamps	
2022	Regina	Deanna Stellato; Maxime Deschamps	Lori-Ann Matte; Thierry Ferland	Patricia Andrew; Steven Adcock	
2023	Winnipeg	Lia Pereira; Trennt Michaud	Brooke McIntosh; Benjamin Mimar	Kelly Ann Laurin; Loucas Ethier	
2024	Winnipeg	Émy Carignan; Bryan Pierro	Fiona Bombardier; Gabriel Farand	Caidence Derenisky; Raine Eberl	
2025	Winnipeg	Cristina Lyons; Marty Haubrich	No other competitors		
2026	Calgary	Miyu Yunoki; Tristan Taylor	Eliana Secunda; Thierry Ferland	No other competitors	

=== Ice dance ===
Year	Location	Gold	Silver	Bronze	Ref.
2011	Regina	Kharis Ralph; Asher Hill	Tarrah Harvey; Keith Gagnon	Helene Letourneau; Kevin Boczar	
2012	Regina	Piper Gilles; Paul Poirier	Nicole Orford; Thomas Williams	Larissa Van As; Troy Shindle	
2013	Regina	Élisabeth Paradis; François-Xavier Ouellette	Mélissande Dumas; David Mackay Perry	No other competitors	
2014	Regina	Kharis Ralph; Asher Hill	Victoria Hasegawa; Connor Hasegawa	Mariève Cyr; Benjamin Brisebois Gaudreau	
2015	Pierrefonds	Élisabeth Paradis; François-Xavier Ouellette	Carolane Soucisse; Simon Tanguay	Mariève Cyr; Benjamin Brisebois Gaudreau	
2016	Edmonton	Carolane Soucisse; Simon Tanguay	Lauren Collins; Shane Firus	Andréanne Poulin; Marc-André Servant	
2017	Pierrefonds	Piper Gilles; Paul Poirier	Carolane Soucisse; Shane Firus	Haley Sales; Nikolas Wamsteeker	
2018	Pierrefonds	Haley Sales; Nikolas Wamsteeker	Sarah Arnold; Thomas Williams	Molly Lanaghan; Dmitre Razgulajevs	
2019	Edmonton	Laurence Fournier Beaudry; Nikolaj Sorensen	Haley Sales; Nikolas Wamsteeker	Molly Lanaghan; Dmitre Razgulajevs	
2020	Edmonton	Haley Sales; Nikolas Wamsteeker	Alicia Fabbri; Paul Ayer	Molly Lanaghan; Dmitre Razgulajevs	
2021	Virtual	Piper Gilles; Paul Poirier	Laurence Fournier Beaudry; Nikolaj Sorensen	Marjorie Lajoie; Zachary Lagha	
2022	Regina	Alicia Fabbri; Paul Ayer	Haley Sales; Nikolas Wamsteeker	Marie-Jade Lauriault; Romain Le Gac	
2023	Winnipeg	Marie-Jade Lauriault; Romain Le Gac	Lily Hensen; Nathan Lickers	Molly Lanaghan; Dmitre Razgulajevs	
2024	Winnipeg	Nadiia Bashynska; Peter Beaumont	Alicia Fabbri; Paul Ayer	Haley Sales; Nikolas Wamsteeker	
2025	Winnipeg	Lily Hensen; Nathan Lickers	Jamie Fournier; Everest Zhu	Alisa Korneva; Kieran MacDonald	
2026	Calgary	Marie-Jade Lauriault; Romain Le Gac	Lily Hensen; Nathan Lickers	Alyssa Robinson; Jacob Portz	

== Junior results ==
=== Men's singles ===
Year	Location	Gold	Silver	Bronze	Ref.
2015	Pierrefonds	Edrian Paul Célestino	Nicolas Nadeau	Antony Cheng	
2016	Edmonton	Joseph Phan	Christian Reekie	Zachary Daleman	
2017	Pierrefonds	Stephen Gogolev	Eric Liu	Conrad Orzel	
2018	Pierrefonds	Iliya Kovler	Corey Circelli	Samuel Turcotte	
2019	Edmonton	Alistair Lam	Jack Dushenski	Beres Clements	
2020	Edmonton	Corey Circelli	Wesley Chiu	Matthew Newnham	
2021	Virtual	Rio Morita	Matthew Newnham	Wesley Chiu	
2022	Regina	Rio Morita	Grayson Long	Shohei Law	
2023	Winnipeg	Grayson Long	Shohei Law	Rio Morita	
2024	Winnipeg	David Shteyngart	Grayson Long	David Howes	
2025	Winnipeg	David Bondar	David Howes	David Shteyngart	
2026	Calgary	Parker Heiderich	William Chan	Ethan Luo	

=== Women's singles ===
Year	Location	Gold	Silver	Bronze	Ref.
2015	Pierrefonds	Triena Robinson	Kelsey Wong	Cailey England	
2016	Edmonton	Amanda Tobin	Mckenna Colthorp	Sarah Tamura	
2017	Pierrefonds	Olivia Gran	Emily Bausback	Mckenna Colthorp	
2018	Pierrefonds	Alison Schumacher	Sarah-Maude Blanchard	Hannah Dawson	
2019	Edmonton	Hannah Dawson	Emma Bulawka	Madeline Schizas	
2020	Edmonton	Kaiya Ruiter	Catherine Carle	Michelle Rivest	
2021	Virtual	Sara-Maude Dupuis	Melody Zhu	Lia Pereira	
2022	Regina	Justine Miclette	Katherine Karon	Alexa Matveev	
2023	Winnipeg	Kara Yun	Lulu Lin	Aleksa Volkova	
2024	Winnipeg	Lulu Lin	Aleksa Volkova	Kara Yun	
2025	Winnipeg	Lia Cho	Reese Rose	Mégane Vallières	
2026	Calgary	Lia Cho	Quinn Startek	Victoria Barakhtina	

=== Pairs ===
Year	Location	Gold	Silver	Bronze	Ref.
2015	Pierrefonds	Shalena Rau / Sebastian Arcieri	Hope McLean / Trennt Michaud	Mary Orr / Phelan Simpson	
2016	Edmonton	Hope McLean / Trennt Michaud	Justine Brasseur / Mathieu Ostiguy	Allison Eby / Brett Varley	
2017	Pierrefonds	Evelyn Walsh / Trennt Michaud	Lori-Ann Matte / Thierry Ferland	Olivia Boys-Eddy / Mackenzie Boys-Eddy	
2018	Pierrefonds	Lori-Ann Matte / Thierry Ferland	Mariah McCaw / Steven Adcock	Olivia Boys-Eddy / Mackenzie Boys-Eddy	
2019	Edmonton	Chloe Choinard / Mathieu Ostiguy	Chloe Panetta /Benjamin Mimar	Patricia Andrew / Paxton Fletcher	
2020	Edmonton	Patricia Andrew / Zachary Daleman	Brooke McIntosh / Brandon Toste	Audrey Carle / Gabriel Farand	
2021	Virtual	Audrey Carle / Gabriel Farand	Kelly Ann Laurin / Loucas Éthier	Meghan Fredette / William St-Louis	
2022	Regina	Brooke McIntosh / Benjamin Mimar	Summer Homick / Marty Haubrich	Emy Carignan / Bryan Pierro	
2023	Winnipeg	Ashlyn Schmitz / Tristan Taylor	Martina Ariano Kent / Alexis Leduc	Jazmine Desrochers / Aidan Wright	
2024	Winnipeg	Beau Callahan / Christophe Roch	Noémie Rolland / Étienne Lacasse	Annika Behnke / Kole Sauve	
2025	Winnipeg	Ava Kemp / Yohnatan Elizarov	Noémie Rolland / Étienne Lacasse	Siyul Back / Gavin Mahoney	
2026	Calgary	Ava Cheung / Stephen Parc Qu Lee	Beau Callahan / Vladimir Furman	Brianna Dion / Jacob Cote	

=== Ice dance ===
Year	Location	Gold	Silver	Bronze	Ref.
2011	Regina	Nicole Orford / Thomas Williams	Laurence Fournier Beaudry / Yoan Breton	Andréanne Poulin / Marc-André Servant	
2012	Regina	Élisabeth Paradis / François-Xavier Ouellette	Madeline Edwards / Zhao Kai Pang	Noa Bruser / Timothy Lum	
2013	Regina	Madeline Edwards / Zhao Kai Pang	Mackenzie Bent / Garrett MacKeen	Mariève Cyr / Benjamin Brisebois Gaudreau	
2014	Regina	Mackenzie Bent / Garrett MacKeen	Danielle Wu / Spencer Soo	Carolane Soucisse / Simon Tanguay	
2015	Pierrefonds	Brianna Delmaestro / Timothy Lum	Danielle Wu / Spencer Soo	Lauren Collins / Shane Firus	
2016	Edmonton	Melinda Meng / Andrew Meng	Marjorie Lajoie / Zachary Lagha	Haley Sales / Nikolas Wamsteeker	
2017	Pierrefonds	Marjorie Lajoie / Zachary Lagha	Valerie Taillefer / Jason Chan	Ashlynne Stairs / Lee Royer	
2018	Pierrefonds	Ashlynne Stairs / Lee Royer	Alicia Fabbri / Claudio Pietrantonio	Olivia McIsaac / Elliott Graham	
2019	Edmonton	Alicia Fabbri / Paul Ayer	Yuka Orihara / Lee Royer	Irina Galiyanova / Grayson Lochhead	
2020	Edmonton	Natalie D'Alessandro / Bruce Waddell	Nadiia Bashynska / Peter Beaumont	Miku Makita / Tyler Gunara	
2021	Virtual	Natalie D'Alessandro / Bruce Waddell	Miku Makita / Tyler Gunara	Nadiia Bashynska / Peter Beaumont	
2022	Regina	Nadiia Bashynska / Peter Beaumont	Hailey Yu / Brendan Giang	Chad'ma Benkhaliifa / Everest Zhu	
2023	Winnipeg	Sandrine Gauthier / Quentin Thieren	Hailey Yu / Brendan Giang	Layla Veillon / Alexander Brandys	
2024	Winnipeg	Chloe Nguyen / Brendan Giang	Layla Veillon / Alexander Brandys	Alisa Korneva / Kieran MacDonald	
2025	Winnipeg	Chloe Nguyen / Brendan Giang	Sandrine Gauthier / Quentin Thieren	Layla Veillon / Alexander Brandys	
2026	Calgary	Summer Homick / Nicholas Buelow	Charlie Anderson / Cayden Dawson	Auréa Cincon-Debout / Earl Jesse Celestino	
