= 2023 CS Nebelhorn Trophy =

Figure skating competition in Germany

- Type: ISU Challenger Series
- Date: September 20 – 23
- Season: 2023–24
- Location: Oberstdorf, Germany
- Host: Deutsche Eislauf Union
- Venue: Eissportzentrum Oberstdorf

Champions
- Men's singles: (France) Adam Siao Him Fa
- Women's singles: (United States) Isabeau Levito
- Pairs: (Germany) Minerva Fabienne Hase / Nikita Volodin
- Ice dance: (United Kingdom) Lilah Fear / Lewis Gibson
- Previous: 2022 CS Nebelhorn Trophy
- Next: 2024 CS Nebelhorn Trophy
- Previous CS: 2023 CS Autumn Classic International
- Next CS: 2023 CS Nepela Memorial

The 2023 CS Nebelhorn Trophy was held on September 20–23, 2023, in Oberstdorf, Germany. It was part of the 2023–24 ISU Challenger Series. Medals were awarded in men's singles, women's singles, pair skating, and ice dance.

== Entries ==
The International Skating Union published the list of entries on August 29, 2023.

Country	Men	Women	Pairs	Ice dance
Austria		Stefanie Pesendorfer		
Azerbaijan				Samantha Ritter / Daniel Brykalov
Canada	Aleksa Rakic	Sara-Maude Dupuis	Kelly Ann Laurin / Loucas Éthier; Lia Pereira / Trennt Michaud	Alicia Fabbri / Paul Ayer; Molly Lanaghan / Dmitre Razgulajevs
Czech Republic	Filip Scerba			Kateřina Mrázková / Daniel Mrázek
Estonia		Gerli Liinamäe		
Finland				Juulia Turkkila / Matthias Versluis
France	Landry Le May; Adam Siao Him Fa	Lorine Schild	Oxana Vouillamoz / Flavien Giniaux	Natacha Lagouge / Arnaud Caffa; Lou Terreaux / Noe Perron
Georgia				Maria Kazakova / Georgy Reviya
Germany	Kai Jagoda		Minerva Fabienne Hase / Nikita Volodin; Annika Hocke / Robert Kunkel; Letizia Roscher / Luis Schuster	Jennifer Janse van Rensburg / Benjamin Steffan
Great Britain			Lydia Smart / Harry Mattick	Lilah Fear / Lewis Gibson
Hungary			Maria Pavlova / Alexei Sviatchenko	
Italy			Lucrezia Beccari / Matteo Guarise; Irma Caldara / Riccardo Maglio; Anna Valesi / Manuel Piazza	
Japan	Koshiro Shimada; Kazuki Tomono			
Lithuania				Allison Reed / Saulius Ambrulevičius
Monaco	Davide Lewton Brain			
Netherlands		Lindsay van Zundert	Nika Osipova / Dmitry Epstein	
Norway		Linnea Kilsand		
Slovenia		Julija Lovrenčič		
South Africa			Julia Mauder / Johannes Wilkinson	
South Korea		Kim Min-chae		
Spain	Euken Alberdi			
Sweden			Greta Crafoord / John Crafoord	Milla Ruud Reitan / Nikolaj Majorov
Switzerland		Livia Kaiser; Alexia Paganini; Kimmy Repond		
Ukraine		Mariia Andriichuk	Sofiia Holichenko / Artem Darenskyi	
United States	Lucas Broussard	Sonja Hilmer; Isabeau Levito	Maria Mokhova / Ivan Mokhov; Valentina Plazas / Maximiliano Fernandez	Christina Carreira / Anthony Ponomarenko; Lorraine McNamara / Anton Spiridonov

=== Changes to preliminary assignments ===
Date	Discipline	Withdrew	Added	Ref.
August 30	Ice dance	—N/a	(Belgium) Olivia Josephine Shilling / Léo Baeten	
September 5	Men	(Latvia) Deniss Vasiļjevs	—N/a	
September 7	Women	(France) Maïa Mazzara	—N/a	
September 11	Men	(France) Corentin Spinar	—N/a	
September 11	Men	(Italy) Daniel Grassl	—N/a	
September 11	Women	(France) Maé-Bérénice Méité	—N/a	
September 15	Women	(Chile) Yae-Mia Neira	—N/a	
September 15	Pairs	(Czech Republic) Federica Simoli / Alexander Zarbo	—N/a	
September 15	Pairs	(United States) Ellie Kam / Danny O'Shea	—N/a	
September 15	Ice dance	(Belgium) Olivia Josephine Shilling / Léo Baeten	—N/a	

== Results ==
=== Men's singles ===
Rank	Skater	Nation	Total points	SP		FS	
1st place, gold medalist(s)	Adam Siao Him Fa	France	279.57	1	95.17	1	184.40
2nd place, silver medalist(s)	Kazuki Tomono	Japan	265.78	2	93.55	2	172.23
3rd place, bronze medalist(s)	Koshiro Shimada	Japan	247.43	3	79.57	3	167.86
4	Lucas Broussard	United States	216.10	4	69.99	4	146.11
5	Aleksa Rakic	Canada	209.88	7	65.03	5	144.85
6	Filip Scerba	Czech Republic	195.58	5	69.17	6	126.41
7	Kai Jagoda	Germany	187.89	8	63.92	7	123.97
8	Landry le May	France	181.77	6	68.77	8	113.00
9	Davide Lewton Brain	Monaco	163.22	9	63.50	9	99.72
10	Euken Alberdi	Spain	129.62	10	40.90	10	88.72

=== Women's singles ===
Rank	Skater	Nation	Total points	SP		FS	
1st place, gold medalist(s)	Isabeau Levito	United States	198.79	1	69.30	2	129.49
2nd place, silver medalist(s)	Kimmy Repond	Switzerland	191.94	3	61.55	1	130.39
3rd place, bronze medalist(s)	Kim Min-chae	South Korea	184.03	2	62.76	3	121.27
4	Livia Kaiser	Switzerland	169.47	6	57.72	4	111.75
5	Alexia Paganini	Switzerland	168.96	5	58.61	5	110.35
6	Lindsay van Zundert	Netherlands	162.52	4	58.96	8	103.56
7	Sonja Hilmer	United States	160.13	9	51.79	7	108.34
8	Lorine Schild	France	155.65	12	46.62	6	109.03
9	Sara-Maude Dupuis	Canada	145.36	7	56.62	11	88.74
10	Linnea Kilsand	Norway	143.77	8	56.58	12	87.19
11	Julija Lovrenčič	Slovenia	134.18	13	43.60	9	90.58
12	Stefanie Pesendorfer	Austria	132.74	10	51.43	13	81.31
13	Mariia Andrichuk	Ukraine	121.95	14	32.62	10	89.33
14	Gerli Liinamäe	Estonia	121.08	11	47.44	14	73.64

=== Pairs ===
Rank	Team	Nation	Total points	SP		FS	
1st place, gold medalist(s)	Minerva Fabienne Hase / Nikita Volodin	Germany	194.96	1	62.85	1	132.11
2nd place, silver medalist(s)	Lucrezia Beccari / Matteo Guarise	Italy	191.71	2	66.36	3	125.35
3rd place, bronze medalist(s)	Annika Hocke / Robert Kunkel	Germany	189.01	3	65.55	4	123.46
4	Lia Pereira / Trennt Michaud	Canada	188.94	4	62.38	2	126.56
5	Maria Pavlova / Alexei Sviatchenko	Hungary	182.60	5	61.34	5	121.26
6	Kelly Ann Laurin / Loucas Éthier	Canada	175.73	6	59.59	6	116.14
7	Valentina Plazas / Maximiliano Fernandez	United States	169.37	7	54.93	7	114.44
8	Sofiia Holichenko / Artem Darenskyi	Ukraine	156.48	8	50.71	8	105.77
9	Anna Valesi / Manuel Piazza	Italy	150.12	10	47.47	9	102.65
10	Irma Caldara / Riccardo Maglio	Italy	139.15	9	47.78	12	91.37
11	Letizia Roscher / Luis Schuster	Germany	138.40	11	46.96	11	91.44
12	Greta Crafoord / John Crafoord	Sweden	131.46	15	39.37	10	92.09
13	Maria Mokhova / Ivan Mokhov	United States	127.05	14	40.58	13	86.47
14	Lydia Smart / Harry Mattick	Great Britain	113.66	13	46.68	15	66.98
15	Julia Mauder / Johannes Wilkinson	South Africa	109.71	16	38.32	14	71.39
WD	Oxana Vouillamoz / Flavien Giniaux	France	withdrew	12	46.72	withdrew from competition	
WD	Nika Osipova / Dmitry Epstein	Netherlands	withdrew from competition				

=== Ice dance ===
Rank	Team	Nation	Total points	RD		FD	
1st place, gold medalist(s)	Lilah Fear / Lewis Gibson	Great Britain	207.84	1	82.42	1	125.42
2nd place, silver medalist(s)	Allison Reed / Saulius Ambrulevičius	Lithuania	190.55	2	73.62	2	116.93
3rd place, bronze medalist(s)	Juulia Turkkila / Matthias Versluis	Finland	183.63	3	69.68	3	113.95
4	Christina Carreira / Anthony Ponomarenko	United States	177.91	6	65.82	4	112.09
5	Kateřina Mrázková / Daniel Mrázek	Czech Republic	177.38	5	67.63	5	109.75
6	Maria Kazakova / Georgy Reviya	Georgia	175.83	4	68.68	6	107.15
7	Jennifer Janse van Rensburg / Benjamin Steffan	Germany	169.30	9	62.27	7	107.03
8	Lorraine McNamara / Anton Spiridonov	United States	167.77	8	63.75	8	104.02
9	Alicia Fabbri / Paul Ayer	Canada	167.14	7	63.84	9	103.30
10	Molly Lanaghan / Dmitre Razgulajevs	Canada	157.81	10	61.31	10	96.50
11	Natacha Lagouge / Arnaud Caffa	France	154.58	11	61.26	11	93.32
12	Lou Terreaux / Noé Perron	France	146.15	13	54.89	12	91.26
13	Milla Ruud Reitan / Nikolaj Majorov	Sweden	141.86	12	56.43	13	85.43
14	Samantha Ritter / Daniel Brykalov	Azerbaijan	122.33	14	44.55	14	77.78
