= Sara-Maude Dupuis =

Canadian figure skater (born 2005)

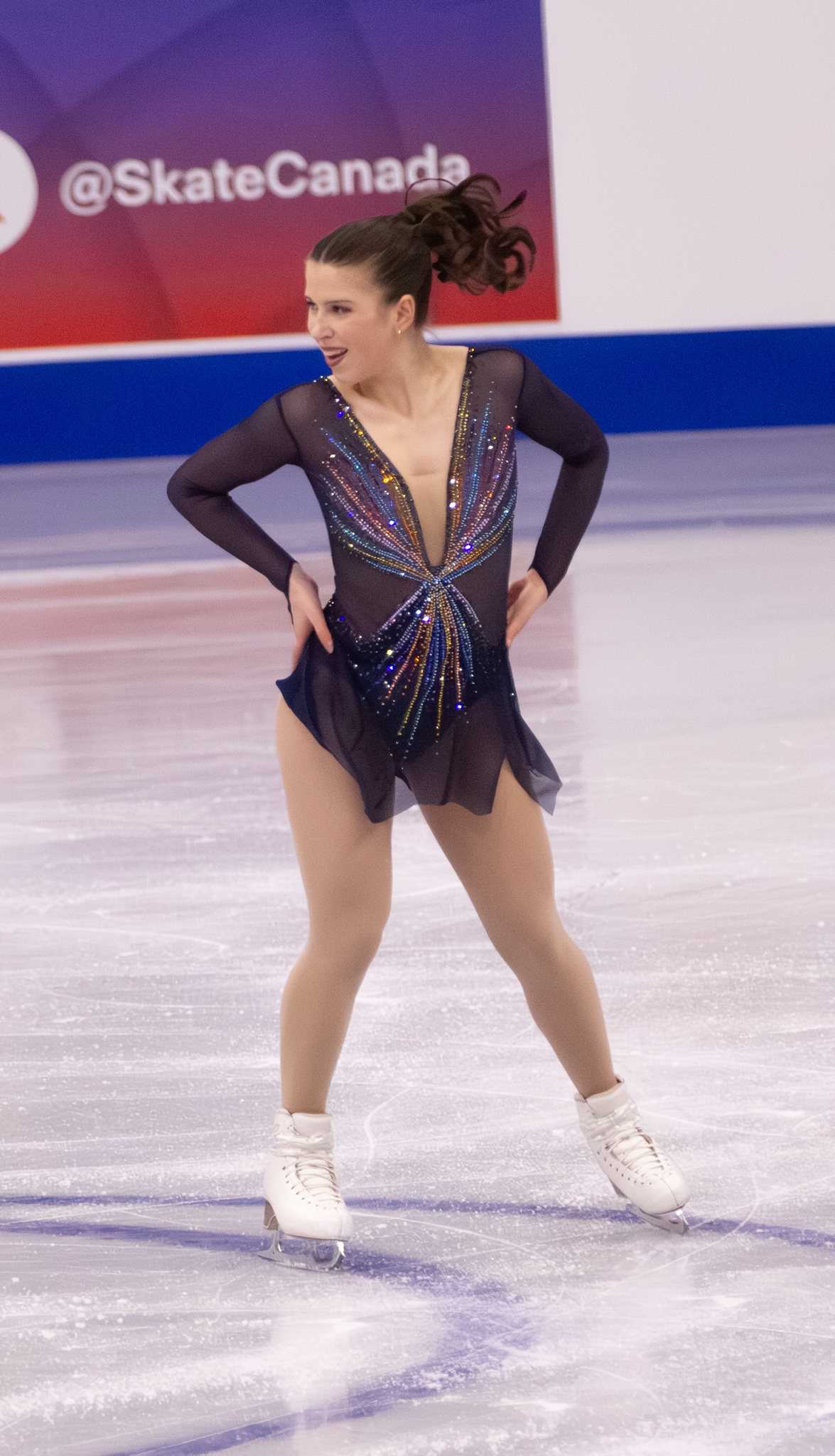
- Dupuis at 2025 Skate Canada International

Personal information
- Born: 3 June 2005 (age 21) Montreal, Québec, Canada
- Home town: Montreal
- Height: 1.56 m (5 ft 1 1/2 in)

Figure skating career
- Country: Canada
- Discipline: Women's singles
- Coach: Stéphane Yvars
- Skating club: Patinage Anjou
- Began skating: 2007

Medal record
Canadian Championships
Silver medal – second place	2025 Laval	Singles

Sara-Maude Dupuis (born 3 June 2005) is a Canadian figure skater. She is the 2025 CS Warsaw Cup champion, the 2024 CS Tallinn Trophy bronze medalist, and the 2025 Canadian national silver medalist.

She is also the first Canadian woman to land a triple Axel in an ISU competition.

== Personal life ==
Dupuis was born on 3 June 2005 in Montreal, Québec, Canada. She attended École secondaire De Mortagne.

== Career ==
=== Early years ===
Dupuis began learning how to skate at age two, and began competing as a singles skater at age six.

=== 2021–22 season: International junior debut ===
Dupuis made her international junior debut for Canada in October 2021 at 2021 JGP Austria. There she narrowly finished within the top ten junior women's skaters, placing tenth of the thirty-five competitors.

She subsequently placed eleventh at the 2022 Canadian Championships.

=== 2022–23 season: International senior debut ===
Dupuis opened the season on the ISU Junior Grand Prix circuit at 2022 JGP Czech Republic where she finished eleventh of thirty-five competitors. She next made her international senior debut at the 2022 CS Ice Challenge, again placing eleventh.

Going on to compete at the 2023 Canadian Championships in January, Dupuis finished just off the podium in fourth place. Following this, Dupuis was assigned to the Canadian team for the 2023 Four Continents Championships along with Madeline Schizas and Justine Miclette. There, she was the top finishing Canadian competitor in the women's event, placing ninth with Schizas and Miclette following in quick succession. Dupuis then concluded her season at the 2023 World Team Trophy, finishing twelfth in the women's singles event and sixth as part of Team Canada.

=== 2023–24 season ===
Dupuis started the season by competing at the 2023 CS Nebelhorn Trophy, where she placed ninth. She then went on to make her senior Grand Prix debut at 2023 Skate Canada International, coming in eleventh place.

In January, Dupuis competed at the 2024 Canadian Championships, where she finished sixth. Selected to compete at the 2024 Four Continents Championships in Shanghai, China, Dupuis closed the season by finishing the event in ninth place.

=== 2024–25 season: Senior national silver ===
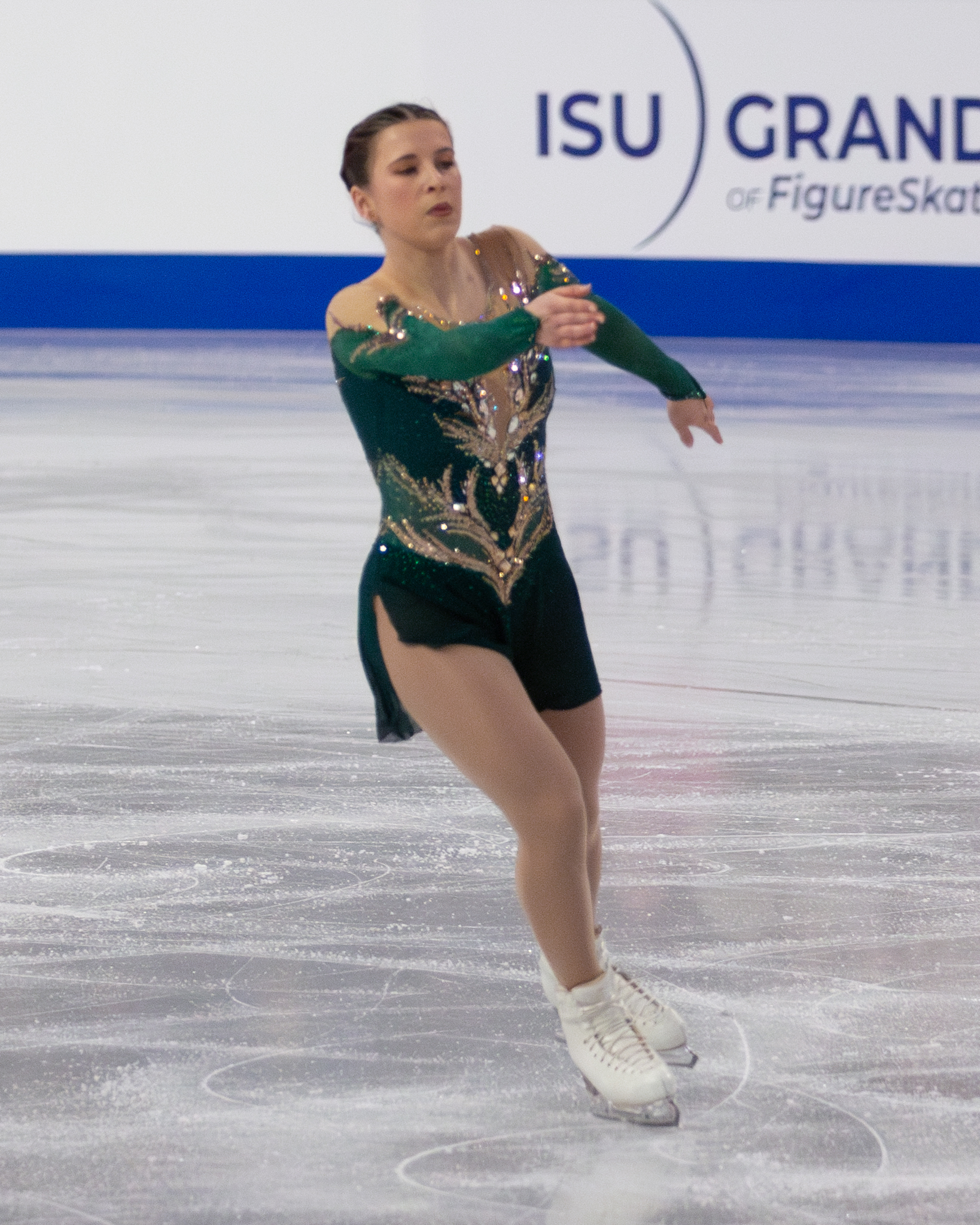
Dupuis at 2024 Skate Canada International

In September, Dupuis began the season with a ninth-place finish at the 2024 CS Nebelhorn Trophy. She then went on to place tenth at the 2024 Skate Canada International as well as win the bronze medal at the 2024 CS Tallinn Trophy.

At the 2025 Canadian Championships, Dupuis placed third in the short program and second in the free skate, winning the silver medal overall behind Madeline Schizas.

Named to the 2025 Four Continents team, Dupuis finished the event in tenth place overall.

Dupuis then closed the season by competing for Team Canada at the 2025 World Team Trophy. She placed tenth in the women's singles event and Team Canada finished in fifth place overall.

=== 2025–26 season: Triple Axel attempts ===
Dupuis opened her season in September by competing at the 2025 CS Nepela Memorial, where she finished in fifth place. At that event, she attempted a triple Axel for the first time during her free skate but stepped out of it.

She went on to compete at 2025 Skate Canada International, finishing in eleventh place. A couple weeks later, at the 2025 CS Warsaw Cup, Dupuis scored personal bests in all competition segments and won the gold medal. Her triple Axel attempt during her free skate was also deemed to be cleanly landed despite receiving negative Grade of Execution (GOE), making her the first Canadian woman to land a triple Axel in an international competition.

In January, she competed at the 2026 Canadian Championships, finishing in eighth place. She was subsequently named to the Four Continents team. At the 2026 Four Continents, Sara-Maude finished in 13th place.

=== 2026–27 season ===
Dupuis begun the new season at the 2026 CS Budapest Trophy where she placed eighth overall.

In October, Dupuis went onto compete on the Grand Prix series; her first stage being the 2026 Skate Canada International. She delivered a clean short program and placed seventh in that segment. During the free program, Dupuis made mistakes on the majority of her jumping passes which led her to place twelfth in that segment and eleventh overall. Subsequently, Dupuis competed at her second Grand Prix assignment at the 2026 Skate America. Dupuis placed sixth in the short program, tenth in the free program and scored a new personal best short program and overall score, concluding the event in ninth place overall.

== Programs ==
Season	Short program	Free skating	Exhibition
2026–2027	Ray of Light by Madonna choreo. by David Wilson	The Thrill Is Gone Requiem; The Thrill Is Gone by Raye choreo. by David Wilson	
2025–2026	Ray of Light by Madonna choreo. by David Wilson	Human; Castells; Dam in China; Paddy Fields; Toil by Armand Amar choreo. by David Wilson	
2024–2025	Never Go Back by Evanescence choreo. by David Wilson	Human; Castells; Dam in China; Paddy Fields; Toil by Armand Amar choreo. by David Wilson	
2023–2024	Never Go Back by Evanescence choreo. by David Wilson	Piano Concerto No. 3 in C minor, Op. 25: I. Allegro moderato; Concerto de Québec: I. Allegro Moderato by Alain Lefèvre choreo. by David Wilson	Feels Like by Gracie Abrams
2022–2023	Take the "A" Train by Nikki Yanofsky choreo. by David Wilson	The 100 by Tree Adams; Empire of Our Own by RAIGN choreo. by David Wilson	Toxic performed by Postmodern Jukebox ft. Melinda Doolittle; Rock This Joint by Yanivi choreo. by Julie Marcotte
2021–2022	Toxic performed by Postmodern Jukebox ft. Melinda Doolittle; Rock This Joint by Yanivi choreo. by Julie Marcotte	The 100 by Tree Adams; Empire of Our Own by RAIGN choreo. by David Wilson	

== Competitive highlights ==
- GP – Event of the ISU Grand Prix of Figure Skating
- JGP – Event of the ISU Junior Grand Prix
- CS – Event of the ISU Challenger Series
- TBD – Assigned
- WD – Withdrew from competition

Competition placements at senior level
Season	2021–22	2022–23	2023–24	2024–25	2025–26	2026-27
Four Continents Championships		9th	9th	10th	13th	
World Team Trophy		6th (12th)		5th (10th)		
Canadian Championships	11th	4th	6th	2nd	8th	
GP Skate America						9th
GP Skate Canada			11th	10th	11th	11th
CS Ice Challenge		11th				
CS Nebelhorn Trophy			9th	9th		
CS Nepela Memorial					5th	
CS Tallinn Trophy				3rd		
CS Warsaw Cup					1st	
CS Budapest Trophy						8th
Skate Canada Challenge	13th	3rd	6th			

Competition placements at junior level
Season	2021–22	2022–23
JGP Austria	10th	
JGP Czech Republic		11th

== Detailed results ==
ISU personal best scores in the +5/-5 GOE System
Segment	Type	Score	Event
Total	TSS	188.28	2026 Skate America
Short program	TSS	68.95	2026 Skate America
Short program	TES	39.60	2026 Skate America
Short program	PCS	29.40	2025 CS Warsaw Cup
Free skating	TSS	119.43	2025 CS Warsaw Cup
Free skating	TES	65.19	2023 Four Continents Championships
Free skating	PCS	59.32	2026 Skate America

=== Senior level ===
- Medals at team events are awarded for the team results only. Individual placements at team events are listed in parentheses.

Results in the 2021-22 season
Date	Event	SP		FS		Total	
Date	Event	P	Score	P	Score	P	Score
Jan 7-13, 2022	(Canada) 2022 Canadian Championships	10	50.18	13	90.87	11	141.05

Results in the 2022-23 season
Date	Event	SP		FS		Total	
Date	Event	P	Score	P	Score	P	Score
Nov 9-13, 2022	(Austria) 2022 CS Ice Challenge	13	50.49	8	103.28	11	153.77
Jan 9-15, 2023	(Canada) 2023 Canadian Championships	4	60.33	4	109.23	4	169.56
Feb 7-12, 2023	(United States) 2023 Four Continents Championships	12	51.68	9	118.99	9	170.67
Apr 13-16, 2023	(Japan) 2023 World Team Trophy	11	54.31	12	94.44	6 (12)	148.75

Results in the 2023–24 season
Date	Event	SP		FS		Total	
Date	Event	P	Score	P	Score	P	Score
Sep 20-23, 2023	(Germany) 2023 CS Nebelhorn Trophy	7	56.62	11	88.74	9	145.36
Oct 27-29, 2023	2023 Skate Canada International	10	52.17	10	99.78	11	151.95
Jan 8-14, 2024	(Canada) 2024 Canadian Championships	3	57.87	7	99.77	6	157.64
Feb 1-4, 2024	(China) 2024 Four Continents Championships	12	56.00	8	116.45	9	172.45

Results in the 2024–25 season
Date	Event	SP		FS		Total	
Date	Event	P	Score	P	Score	P	Score
Sep 18–21, 2024	(Germany) 2024 CS Nebelhorn Trophy	4	62.20	10	104.11	9	166.31
Oct 25–27, 2024	2024 Skate Canada International	9	54.15	9	106.31	10	160.46
Nov 12–17, 2024	(Estonia) 2024 CS Tallinn Trophy	2	55.04	4	108.54	3	163.58
Jan 14–19, 2025	(Canada) 2025 Canadian Championships	3	59.81	2	122.80	2	182.61
Feb 19–23, 2025	(South Korea) 2025 Four Continents Championships	9	62.35	12	116.01	10	178.36
Apr 17–20, 2025	(Japan) 2025 World Team Trophy	10	61.88	10	99.07	5 (10)	160.95

Results in the 2025–26 season
Date	Event	SP		FS		Total	
Date	Event	P	Score	P	Score	P	Score
Sep 25–27, 2025	(Slovakia) 2025 CS Nepela Memorial	3	64.16	6	114.61	5	178.77
Oct 31 – Nov 2, 2025	2025 Skate Canada International	8	60.41	12	103.17	11	163.58
Nov 19–23, 2025	(Poland) 2025 CS Warsaw Cup	1	66.23	1	119.43	1	185.66
Jan 5-11, 2026	(Canada) 2026 Canadian Championships	3	65.74	12	104.21	8	169.95
Jan 21-25, 2026	(China) 2026 Four Continents Championships	13	56.59	13	110.36	13	166.95

Results in the 2026–27 season
Date	Event	SP		FS		Total	
Date	Event	P	Score	P	Score	P	Score
Oct 15-18, 2026	(Hungary) 2026 CS Budapest Trophy	13	56.92	6	112.86	8	169.78
Oct 30 - Nov 1, 2026	2026 Skate Canada International	7	64.58	12	94.05	11	158.63
Nov 13–15, 2026	(United States) 2026 Skate America	6	68.95	10	119.33	9	188.28

=== Junior Level ===
Results in the 2021-22 season
Date	Event	SP		FS		Total	
Date	Event	P	Score	P	Score	P	Score
Oct 6-9, 2021	2021 JGP Austria	7	53.40	10	90.14	10	143.54

Results in the 2022-23 season
Date	Event	SP		FS		Total	
Date	Event	P	Score	P	Score	P	Score
Aug 31-Sep 3, 2022	2022 JGP Czech Republic	11	51.11	12	92.06	11	143.17
