= Kelly Ann Laurin =

Canadian pair skater (born 2005)

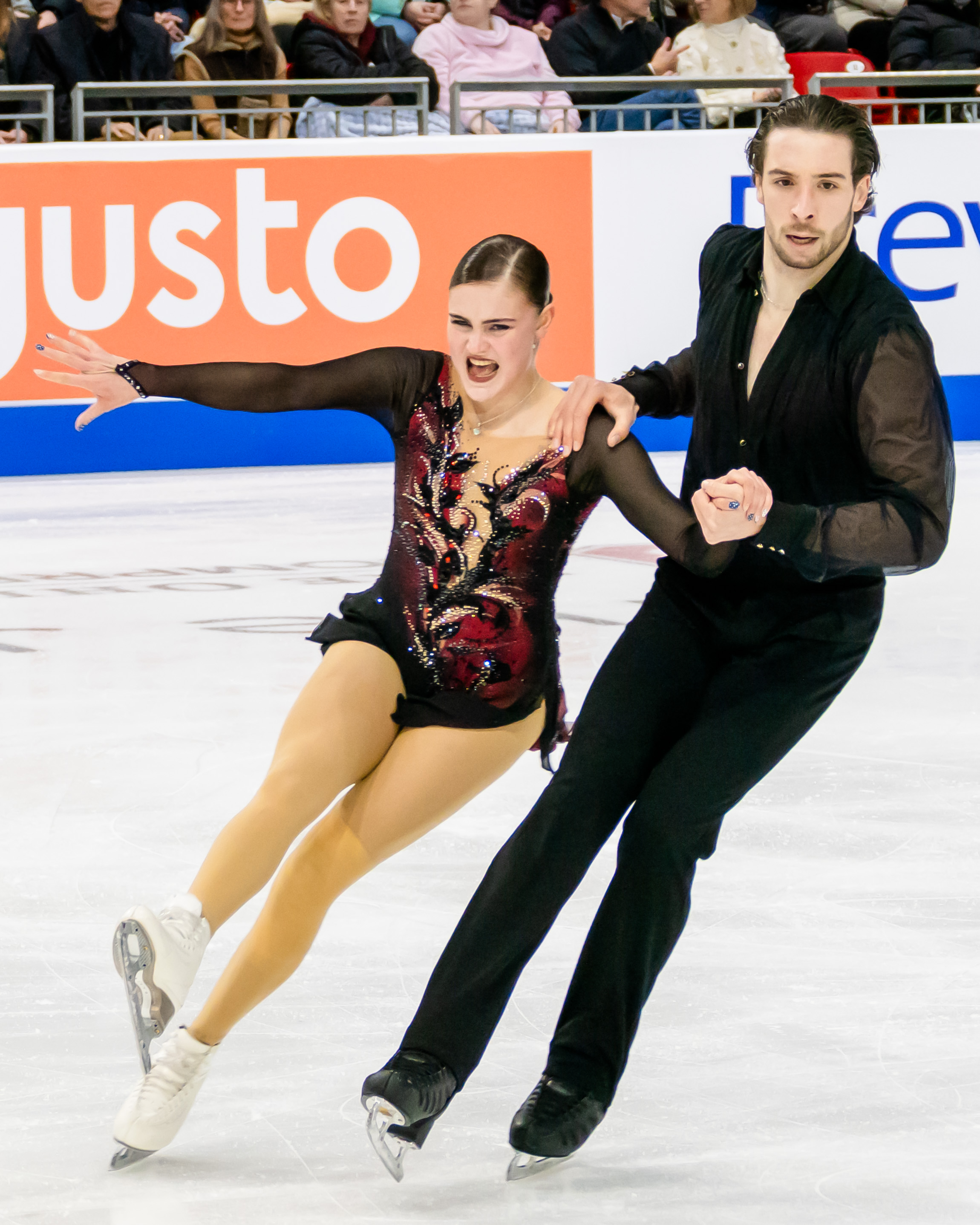
- Kelly Ann Laurin and Loucas Éthier during their short program at 2025 Skate America

Personal information
- Born: November 16, 2005 (age 20) Saint-Jérôme, Quebec, Canada
- Height: 1.60 m (5 ft 3 in)

Figure skating career
- Country: Canada
- Discipline: Pair skating
- Partner: Loucas Éthier (2018–26)
- Coach: Stéphanie Valois; Yvan Desjardins; Violaine Émard; Annie Barabé
- Skating club: Patinage St-Jérôme
- Began skating: 2011

Medal record
Canadian Championships
Bronze medal – third place	2024 Calgary	Pairs
Bronze medal – third place	2025 Laval	Pairs
Bronze medal – third place	2026 Gatineau	Pairs

Kelly Ann Laurin (born November 16, 2005) is a Canadian pair skater. With her skating partner, Loucas Éthier, she is a two-time Grand Prix medallist and a three-time Canadian national bronze medallist (2024–26).

== Personal life ==
Laurin was born on November 16, 2005 in Saint-Jérôme, Quebec, Canada. She has a younger sister, Mahély.

== Career ==
=== Early years ===
Laurin began learning to skate in 2011. In 2018, she teamed up with Loucas Éthier. The two won gold in the novice pairs' event at the 2019 Canadian Championships.

=== 2019–20 season: Debut of Laurin/Éthier ===
Laurin/Éthier appeared at one ISU Junior Grand Prix event, placing sixth in Poland. They became junior national bronze medallists at the 2020 Canadian Championships and were assigned to the 2020 World Junior Championships, where they finished fourteenth.

=== 2020–21 season ===
Laurin/Éthier placed second in junior pairs at the Skate Canada Challenge, a qualifier for the 2021 Canadian Championships. The latter event was cancelled, along with many internationals, due to the COVID-19 pandemic.

=== 2021–22 season ===
The pair moved up to the senior ranks for the 2021–22 season. They placed sixth at the 2022 Canadian Championships.

=== 2022–23 season: Senior international debut, Grand Prix bronze ===
Making their senior international debut, Laurin/Éthier placed fifth at the 2022 CS U.S. International Figure Skating Classic. They were then invited to make their Grand Prix debut at the 2022 Skate America. In a pairs field marked by the absence of Russian competitors as a result of the Russo-Ukrainian War, Laurin/Éthier won the bronze medal, which he called "a big deal for us." They were seventh at Skate Canada International the following weekend.

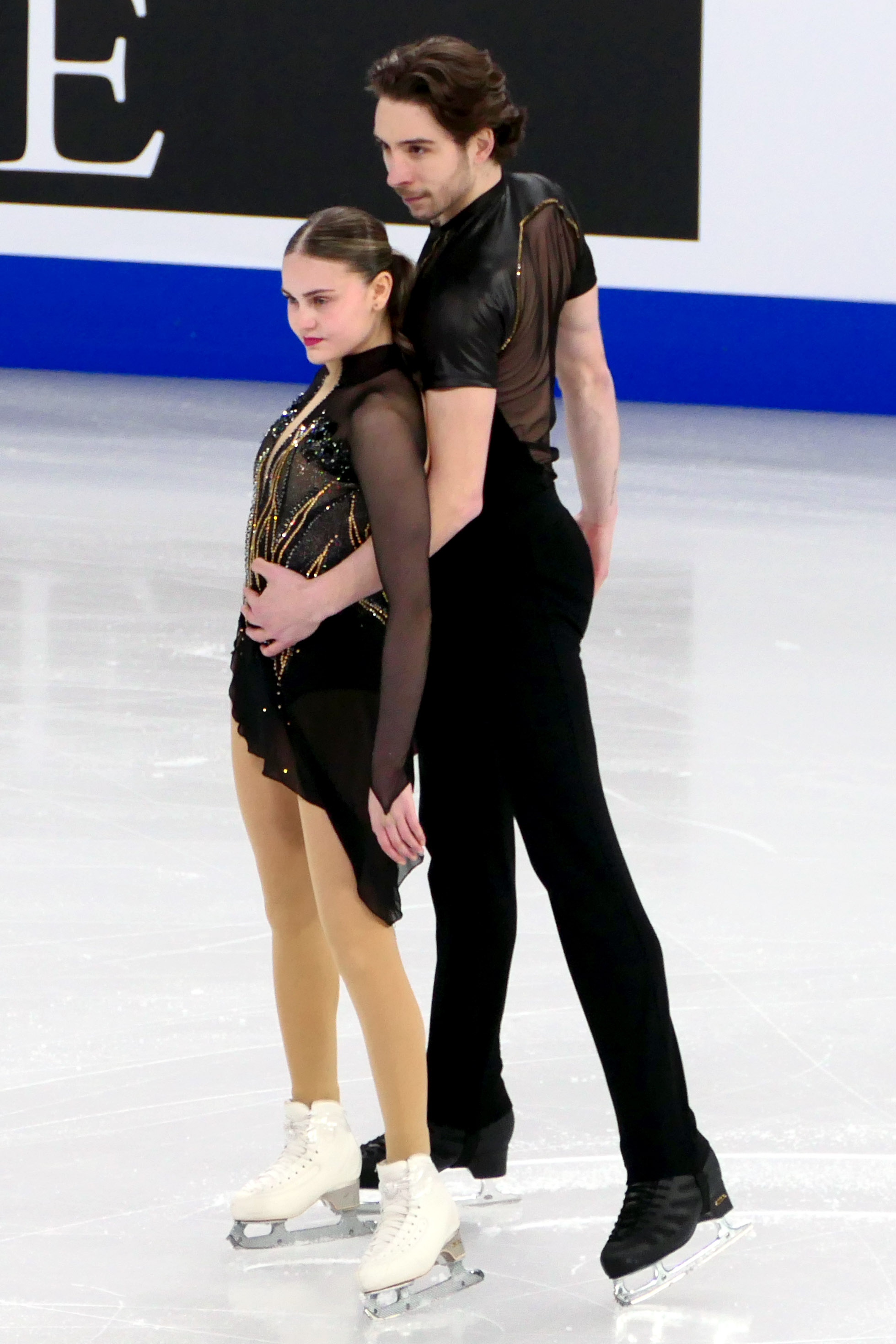
Laurin/Éthier during their short program at the 2024 World Championships

Following the Grand Prix, Laurin/Éthier won the bronze medal at the 2022–23 Skate Canada Challenge to qualify to the 2023 Canadian Championships. They finished third in the short program at the national championships, but in the free skate they were overtaken by Pereira/Michaud for the bronze medal. Despite finishing fourth overall, they were named to compete at the 2023 Four Continents Championships. Laurin/Éthier finished seventh at the event, setting new personal bests in the process.

=== 2023–24 season: World Championships debut ===
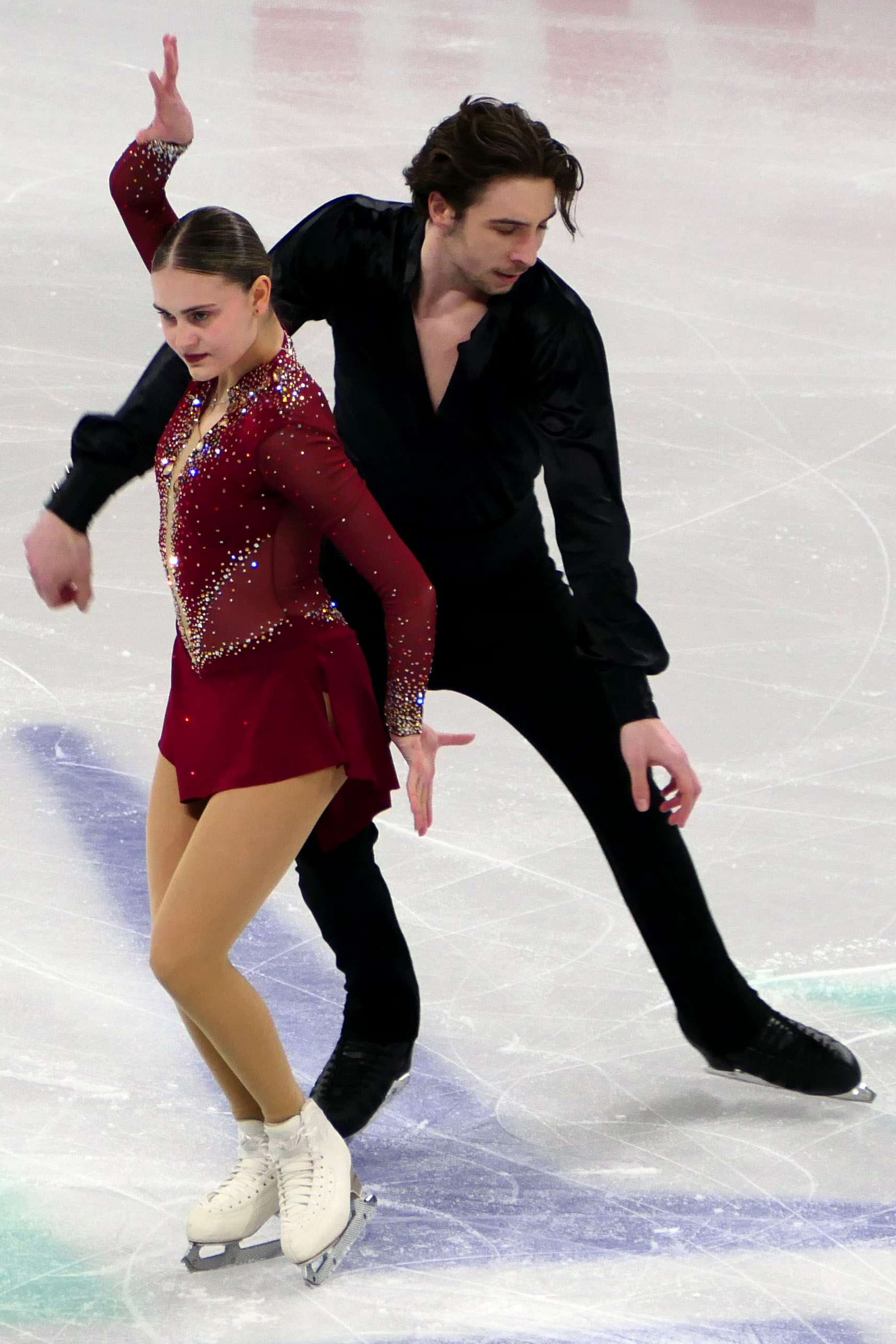
Laurin/Éthier during their free skate at the 2024 World Championships

Laurin/Éthier finished sixth at the 2023 CS Nebelhorn Trophy to start their season. Appearing on the Grand Prix at the 2023 Skate Canada International, they came seventh of eight teams in the short program, but rose to fifth place overall following the free skate. Weeks later at the 2023 NHK Trophy, they placed seventh of eight teams in the short program with a difficult skate that Éthier called "one of the worst programs of our competitive career." They performed much more strongly in the free skate, coming sixth in the segment, though staying seventh overall. He said after that "we skated for ourselves and for redemption and just to prove to ourselves what we could really do after our short performance," adding that the event was "an unreal experience."

At the 2024 Canadian Championships, Laurin/Éthier came third in both segments and took the bronze medal, their first appearance on the senior national podium. They went on to place eighth at the 2024 Four Continents Championships.

The 2024 World Championships were held on home ice in Montreal, Quebec, Canada. Laurin/Éthier, as Quebecois skaters, received a particularly notable reception from the crowds at the Bell Centre. Of this, she said that it "was a great feeling to skate like that at home. I was just very proud of us, what we did." The team came fourteenth in the short program, qualifying to the free skate. Fifteenth in the free skate, they finished fifteenth overall in their World Championship debut.

=== 2024–25 season ===
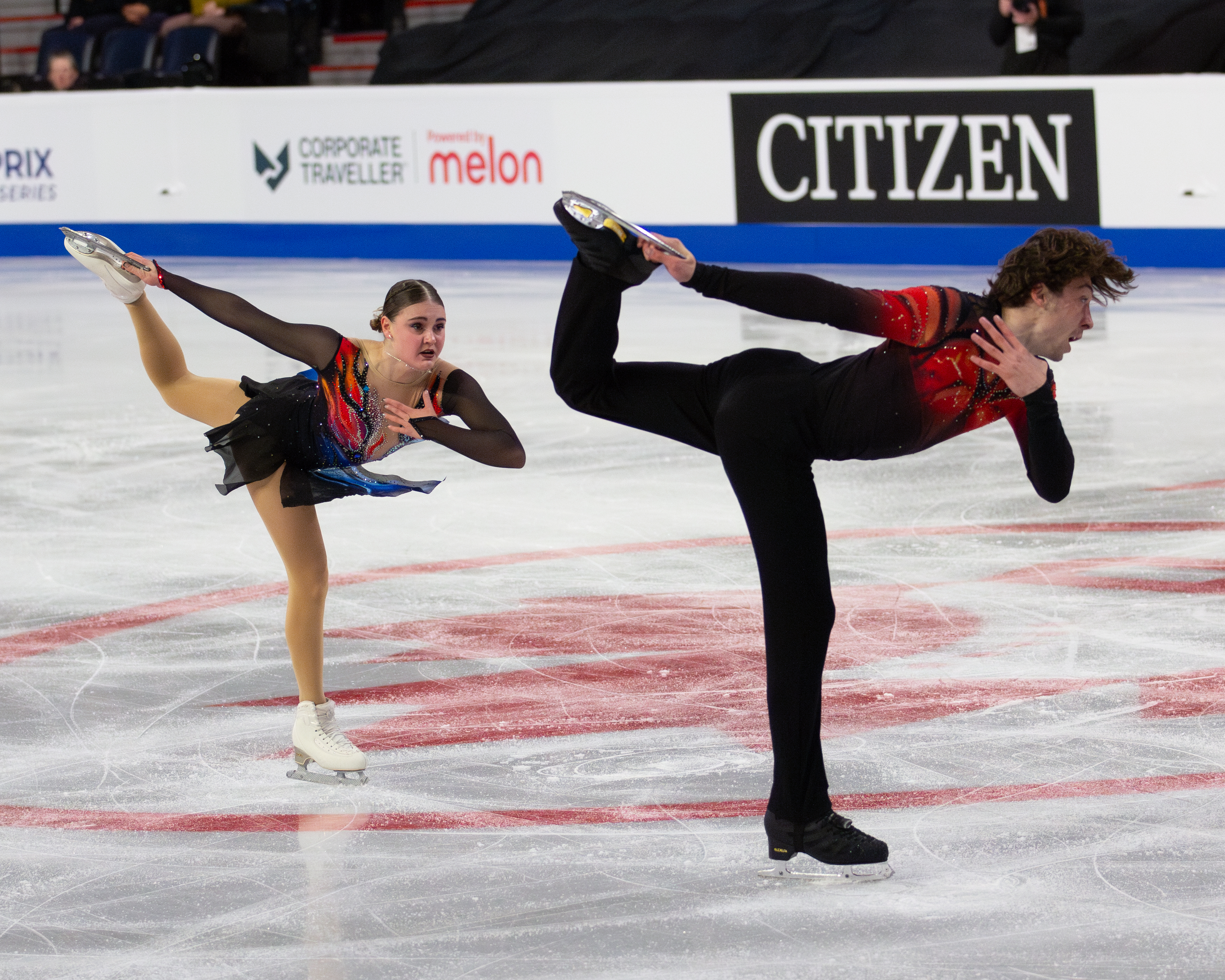
Laurin/Éthier performing a side-by-side spin at 2024 Skate Canada International

Laurin/Éthier started the season by competing at the 2024 CS John Nicks International Pairs Competition, where they finished fourth. In their first appearance on the 2024–25 Grand Prix series at 2024 Skate Canada International, they placed eighth in the short program, with errors that included an invalidated death spiral element, something they professed confusion over. Eighth in the free skate as well, they were eighth overall. Laurin/Éthier fared better at their second Grand Prix assignment, the 2024 Finlandia Trophy, where they finished fourth overall and managed new personal bests in the free skate (118.12) and total score (178.57). Their score was 3.02 points back of bronze medalists Ghilardi/Ambrosini. “We are really happy about this competition,” said Laurin. “We were able to show almost two clean skates for the first time this season.”

At the 2025 Canadian Championships, Laurin/Éthier won their second consecutive national bronze medal, coming third in both segments of the competition.

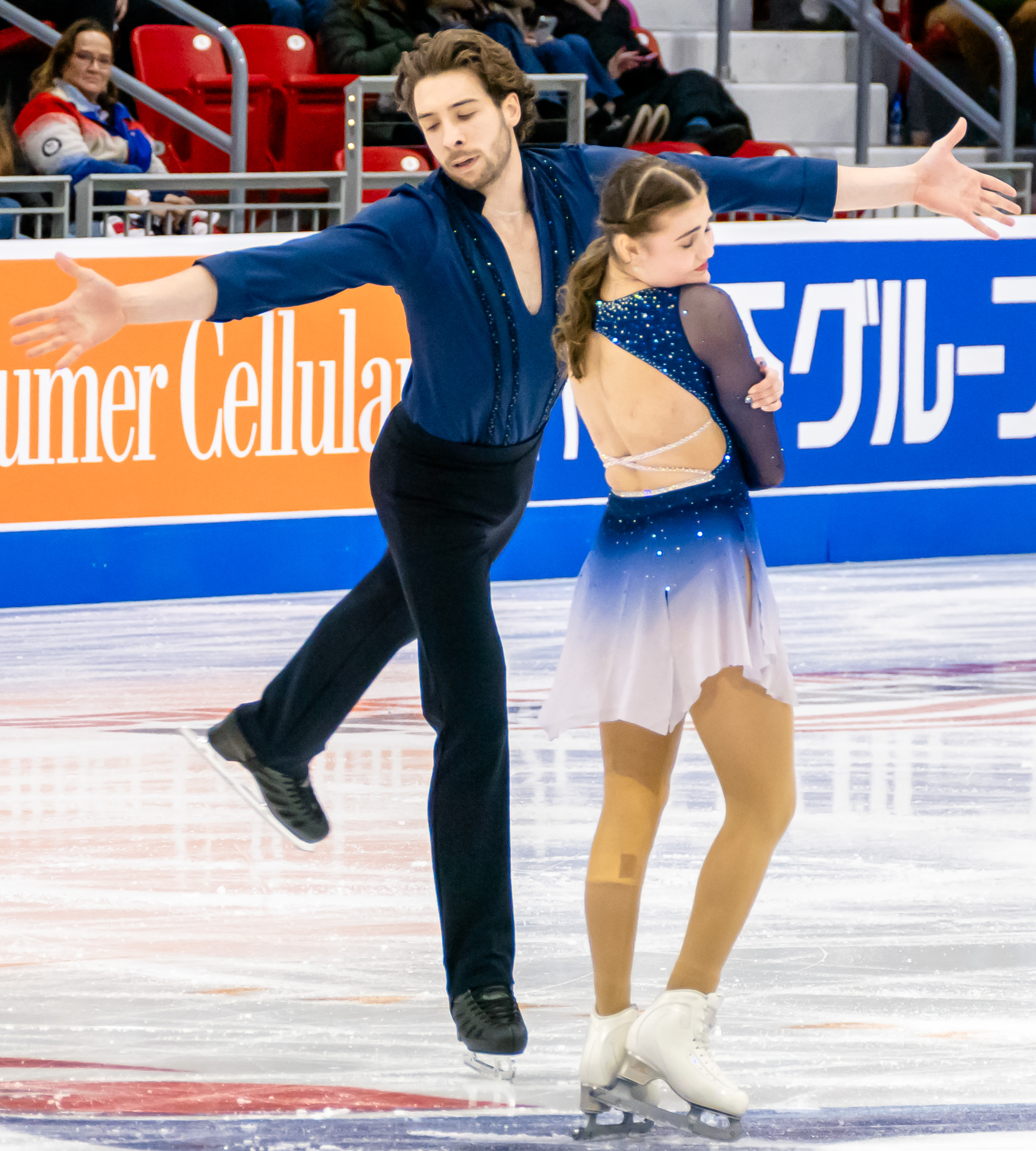
Laurin/Éthier performing their free skate at 2025 Skate America

Going on to compete at the 2025 Four Continents Championships in Seoul, South Korea, Laurin/Éthier placed seventh in the short program and ninth in the free skate, finishing the event in ninth place overall. They then finished the season by competing at the 2025 World Championships in Boston, Massachusetts, United States, where they placed sixteenth overall.

=== 2025–26 season: Grand Prix bronze ===
Laurin and Éthier began their season at 2025 Skate Canada International, where they finished fifth. Two weeks later, they rose from sixth place after the short program to third overall for the bronze at 2025 Skate America. "For us, it’s kind of a full circle moment," said Éthier. "We medaled at our first Grand Prix here in Skate America (in 2022) and now to be back on the podium feels really good."

In January, Laurin and Éthier won the bronze medal at the 2026 Canadian Championships behind Pereira/Michaud and Stellato-Dudek/Deschamps.

Less than two weeks later, Laurin and Éthier competed at the 2026 Four Continents Figure Skating Championships where they finished fifth. It was their highest ranking in their fourth appearance at this event.

== Programs ==
with Éthier

Season	Short program	Free skating	Exhibition
2025–2026	Asturias by Suprhot & 2WEI choreo. by Mark Pillay, Paul Boll	The Turmoil of Love by Karl Hugo; Say Something by A Great Big World & Christina Aguilera choreo. by David Wilson, Sandra Bezic	
2024–2025	Separate Ways (Worlds Apart) (from Stranger Things) by Journey choreo. by Mark Pillay, Paul Boll	Elevation by U2 choreo. by David Wilson, Sandra Bezic	The Scientist by Coldplay; Chasing Cars by Snow Patrol performed by Tommee Profitt & Fleurie
2023–2024	All Right Now by Superhuman choreo. by Mark Pillay	You Don't Own Me performed by Brenna Whitaker; Independent Mind by Karl Hugo choreo. by David Wilson	Dream by Imagine Dragons
2022–2023	All Right Now by Superhuman choreo. by Mark Pillay	Carnival Row: Main Title by Nathan Barr; In the End by Tommee Profitt, Chester Bennington, Mike Shinoda, Fleurie choreo. by Mylène Girard	Money Heist: My Life Is Going On by Cecilia Krull; Bella ciao performed by Manu Pilas
2019–2020	Doctor Zhivago by Maurice Jarre choreo. by Stéphanie Valois	Ever After by George Fenton choreo. by Stéphanie Valois	

== Competitive highlights ==
=== Pair skating with Loucas Éthier ===
- GP – Event of the ISU Grand Prix Series
- JGP – Event of the ISU Grand Prix Series
- CS – Event of the ISU Challenger Series
- TBD – Assigned
- WD – Withdrew from competition
- C – Event was cancelled

Competition placements at senior level
Season	2021–22	2022–23	2023–24	2024–25	2025–26
World Championships			15th	16th	19th
Four Continents Championships		7th	8th	9th	5th
Canadian Championships	6th	4th	3rd	3rd	3rd
GP Finland				4th	
GP NHK Trophy			7th		
GP Skate America		3rd			3rd
GP Skate Canada		7th	5th	8th	5th
CS John Nicks Pairs				4th	
CS Nebelhorn Trophy			6th		
CS U.S. Classic		5th			
Skate Canada Challenge	4th	3rd			

Competition placements at junior level
Season	2019–20	2020–21
World Junior Championships	14th	
Canadian Championships	3rd	C
JGP Poland	6th	
Bavarian Open	1st	
Skate Canada Challenge	8th	2nd

== Detailed results ==
ISU personal best scores in the +5/-5 GOE System
Segment	Type	Score	Event
Total	TSS	188.27	2026 Four Continents Championships
Short program	TSS	65.68	2026 Four Continents Championships
Short program	TES	36.37	2026 Four Continents Championships
Short program	PCS	29.31	2026 Four Continents Championships
Free skating	TSS	122.59	2026 Four Continents Championships
Free skating	TES	64.18	2025 Skate America
Free skating	PCS	59.84	2026 Four Continents Championships

=== Senior level ===
Results in the 2021–22 season
Date	Event	SP		FS		Total	
Date	Event	P	Score	P	Score	P	Score
Dec 1–5, 2021	2022 Skate Canada Challenge	4	50.66	2	100.49	4	151.15
Jan 7–13, 2022	(Canada) 2022 Canadian Championships	7	49.93	6	98.84	6	148.77

Results in the 2022–23 season
Date	Event	SP		FS		Total	
Date	Event	P	Score	P	Score	P	Score
Sep 12–15, 2022	(United States) 2022 CS U.S. International Classic	5	50.48	5	100.33	5	150.81
Oct 21–23, 2022	(United States) 2022 Skate America	4	52.59	3	104.35	3	156.94
Oct 28–30, 2022	2022 Skate Canada International	8	50.84	6	101.25	7	152.09
Nov 30 – Dec 3, 2022	2023 Skate Canada Challenge	4	60.50	4	100.35	3	160.85
Jan 9–15, 2023	(Canada) 2023 Canadian Championships	3	65.61	4	109.66	4	175.27
Feb 7–12, 2023	(United States) 2023 Four Continents Championships	6	59.12	7	108.55	7	167.67

Results in the 2023–24 season
Date	Event	SP		FS		Total	
Date	Event	P	Score	P	Score	P	Score
Sep 20–23, 2023	(Germany) 2023 CS Nebelhorn Trophy	6	59.59	6	116.14	6	175.73
Oct 27–29, 2023	2023 Skate Canada International	7	57.14	5	110.98	5	168.12
Nov 24–26, 2023	(Japan) 2023 NHK Trophy	7	49.18	6	111.61	7	160.79
Jan 8–14, 2024	(Canada) 2024 Canadian Championships	3	62.21	3	125.19	3	187.40
Feb 1–4, 2024	(China) 2024 Four Continents Championships	8	58.50	7	115.97	8	174.47
Mar 18–24, 2024	(Canada) 2024 World Championships	14	60.18	15	109.30	15	169.48

Results in the 2024-25 season
Date	Event	SP		FS		Total	
Date	Event	P	Score	P	Score	P	Score
Sep 3-4, 2024	(United States) 2024 CS John Nicks Pairs Competition	5	60.97	4	113.11	4	174.08
Oct 25–27, 2024	2024 Skate Canada International	8	52.16	8	111.44	8	163.60
Nov 15–17, 2024	(Finland) 2024 Finlandia Trophy	4	60.45	4	118.12	4	178.57
Jan 14–19, 2025	(Canada) 2025 Canadian Championships	3	63.10	3	124.19	3	187.29
Feb 19–23, 2025	(South Korea) 2025 Four Continents Championships	7	62.90	9	107.33	9	170.23
Mar 25–30, 2025	(United States) 2025 World Championships	12	62.30	18	107.25	16	169.55

Results in the 2025–26 season
Date	Event	SP		FS		Total	
Date	Event	P	Score	P	Score	P	Score
Oct 31 – Nov 2, 2025	2025 Skate Canada International	6	59.93	6	108.31	5	168.24
Nov 14–16, 2025	(United States) 2025 Skate America	6	61.29	2	121.58	3	182.87
Jan 5–11, 2026	(Canada) 2026 Canadian Championships	4	64.92	2	132.49	3	197.41
Jan 21-25, 2026	(China) 2026 Four Continents Championships	5	65.68	5	122.59	5	188.27
Mar 24–29, 2026	(Czech Republic) 2026 World Championships	12	63.99	18	103.76	19	167.75

=== Junior level ===
Results in the 2019–20 season
Date	Event	SP		FS		Total	
Date	Event	P	Score	P	Score	P	Score
Sep 18–21, 2019	2019 JGP Poland	7	45.84	6	84.64	6	130.48
Nov 27 – Dec 1, 2019	2020 Skate Canada Challenge	9	44.23	4	85.43	8	129.66
Jan 13–19, 2020	(Canada) 2020 Canadian Championships	3	50.50	3	87.62	3	138.12
Feb 3–9, 2020	(Germany) 2020 Bavarian Open	2	49.96	1	89.75	1	139.71
Mar 2–8, 2020	(Estonia) 2020 World Junior Championships	12	47.77	13	83.24	14	131.01

Results in the 2020–21 season
Date	Event	SP		FS		Total	
Date	Event	P	Score	P	Score	P	Score
Jan 8–17, 2021	2021 Skate Canada Challenge	2	49.24	4	79.33	2	128.57
