= 2025 Canadian Figure Skating Championships =

- Type: National championships
- Date: January 14 – 19
- Season: 2024–25
- Location: Laval, Quebec
- Host: Skate Canada
- Venue: Place Bell

Champions
- Men's singles: Roman Sadovsky (Senior) & David Bondar (Junior)
- Women's singles: Madeline Schizas (Senior) & Lia Cho (Junior)
- Pairs: Deanna Stellato-Dudek and Maxime Deschamps (Senior) & Ava Kemp and Yohnatan Elizarov (Junior)
- Ice dance: Piper Gilles and Paul Poirier (Senior) & Chloe Hguyen and Brendan Giang (Junior)
- Synchronized skating: Les Suprêmes (Senior) & Les Suprêmes (Junior)
- Previous: 2024 Canadian Championships
- Next: 2026 Canadian Championships

The 2025 Canadian National Skating Championships were held from January 14–19, 2025, at the Place Bell in Laval, Quebec. Medals were awarded in men's singles, women's singles, pair skating, and ice dance at the senior and junior levels. The results were part of the Canadian selection criteria for the 2025 World Championships, the 2025 Four Continents Championships, and the 2025 World Junior Championships.

== Entries ==
A list of entries was posted prior to the competition.

=== Senior ===
Senior entries
Men	Women	Pairs	Ice dance	Synchronized skating
Damien Bueckert	Breken Brezden	Fiona Bombardier; Benjamin Mimar	Nadiia Bashynska; Peter Beaumont	Black Gold
Edrian Paul Celestino	Marie-France D'Amour	Jazmine Desrochers; Kieran Thrasher	Alicia Fabbri; Paul Ayer	Les Suprêmes
Brian Chiem	Sara-Maude Dupuis	Kelly Ann Laurin; Loucas Éthier	Éliane Foroglou-Gadoury; Luke Anderson	NEXXICE
Antoine Goyette	Grace Johnson	Cristina Lyons; Marty Haubrich	Jamie Fournier; Everest Zhu	Nova
Alec Guinzbourg	Fée-Ann Landry	Lia Pereira; Trennt Michaud	Piper Gilles; Paul Poirier	—N/a
John Kim	Julianne Lussier	Deanna Stellato-Dudek; Maxime Deschamps	Lily Hensen; Nathan Lickers	—N/a
Shohei Law	Katherine Medland Spence	—N/a	Alisa Korneva; Kieran MacDonald	—N/a
David Li	Justine Miclette	—N/a	Marjorie Lajoie; Zachary Lagha	—N/a
Grayson Long	Marie-Maude Pomerleau	—N/a	Marie-Jade Lauriault; Romain Le Gac	—N/a
Rio Morita	Kaiya Ruiter	—N/a	Alyssa Robinson; Jacob Portz	—N/a
Matthew Newnham	Marie-Raphaële Savoie	—N/a	—N/a	—N/a
Anthony Paradis	Madeline Schizas	—N/a	—N/a	—N/a
Aleksa Rakic	Hetty Shi	—N/a	—N/a	—N/a
Roman Sadovsky	Natalie Roccatani	—N/a	—N/a	—N/a
Bruce Waddell	Uliana Shiryaeva	—N/a	—N/a	—N/a
—N/a	Megan Woodley	—N/a	—N/a	—N/a
—N/a	Amy Shao Ning Yang	—N/a	—N/a	—N/a
—N/a	Kara Yun	—N/a	—N/a	—N/a
—N/a	Uma Zagele	—N/a	—N/a	—N/a

=== Junior ===
Junior entries
Men	Women	Pairs	Ice dance	Synchronized skating
David Bondar	Calissa Adlem	Martina Ariano Kent; Charly Laliberté Laurent	Charlie Anderson; Cayden Dawson	Gold Ice
James Cha	Sandrine Blais	Siyul Back; Gavin Mahoney	Laurence Brière; Julien Lévesque	Golding Ice
William Chan	Lia Cho	Ava Kemp; Yohnatan Elizarov	Victoria Carandiuc; Andrei Carandiuc	ICE Ignite
Nico Conforti	Laurence Gignac	Julia Quattrocchi; Simon Desmarais	Nelly-Anne Chao; Thierry Caron	Les Suprêmes
Jake Ellis	Sadie Henderson	Noémie Rolland; Étienne Lacasse	Auréa Cinçon-Debout; Earl Jesse Celestino	Lower Mainland Junior
Louie Fukuda-Wu	Natasha Hewitt	—N/a	Audra Gans; Gabriel Liu	NEXXICE
Vladimir Furman	Gabrielle Jugnauth	—N/a	Sandrine Gauthier; Quentin Thieren	Nova
Parker Heiderich	Kaydee Kallay	—N/a	Sophia Gover; Billy Wilson-French	—N/a
David Howes	Séléna Koster	—N/a	Summer Homick; Nicholas Buelow	—N/a
Étienne Lacasse	Ksenia Krouzkevitch	—N/a	Olympia Kalaganis; Émile Deveau	—N/a
Tehryn Lee	Konstantina Lock	—N/a	Anjou Karino; Andrew Song	—N/a
Christopher Manis	Yaena Nam	—N/a	Caroline Kravets; Aiden Dotzert	—N/a
Jonathon Moravec	Brookelynn Pollock	—N/a	Rachel Martins; Juel Kowalczyk	—N/a
Kole Sauve	Reese Rose	—N/a	Chloe Nguyen; Brendan Giang	—N/a
Liam Schmidt	Rebecca Schindel	—N/a	Layla Veillon; Alexander Brandys	—N/a
David Shteyngart	Eva Sicurella	—N/a	—N/a	—N/a
Neo Tran	Kassidy Sinclair	—N/a	—N/a	—N/a
Edward Nicholas Vasii	Kaylee Sun	—N/a	—N/a	—N/a
—N/a	Mégane Vallières	—N/a	—N/a	—N/a

=== Changes to preliminary assignments ===
Date	Discipline	Withdrew	Added	Notes	Ref.
January 2	Senior men	Wesley Chiu		Ankle issues	

== Medal summary ==
=== Senior medallists ===
Discipline	Gold	Silver	Bronze
Men	Roman Sadovsky	Anthony Paradis	David Li
Women	Madeline Schizas	Sara-Maude Dupuis	Katherine Medland Spence
Pairs	Deanna Stellato-Dudek; Maxime Deschamps	Lia Pereira; Trennt Michaud	Kelly Ann Laurin; Loucas Éthier
Ice dance	Piper Gilles; Paul Poirier	Marjorie Lajoie; Zachary Lagha	Alicia Fabbri; Paul Ayer
Synchronized skating	Les Suprêmes	Nova	NEXXICE

=== Junior medallists ===
Discipline	Gold	Silver	Bronze
Men	David Bondar	Edward Vasii	David Howes
Women	Lia Cho	Ksenia Krouzkevitch	Sandrine Blais
Pairs	Ava Kemp; Yohnatan Elizarov	Martina Ariano-Kent; Charly Laliberté-Laure	Julia Quattrocchi; Simon Desmarais
Ice dance	Chloe Nguyen; Brendan Giang	Sandrine Gauthier; Quentin Thieren	Layla Veillon; Alexander Brandys
Synchronized skating	Les Suprêmes	NEXXICE	Nova

== Senior results ==
=== Men's singles ===
Men's results
Rank	Skater	Total	SP		FS	
1st place, gold medalist(s)	Roman Sadovsky	240.35	1	81.44	1	158.91
2nd place, silver medalist(s)	Anthony Paradis	225.56	2	77.27	2	148.29
3rd place, bronze medalist(s)	David Li	197.99	4	65.04	3	132.95
4	Grayson Long	188.76	9	58.81	4	129.95
5	John Kim	186.45	3	71.32	7	115.13
6	Matthew Newham	186.33	5	64.33	5	122.00
7	Bruce Waddell	181.97	6	63.84	6	118.13
8	Rio Morita	167.13	13	53.23	8	113.90
9	Shohei Law	165.22	8	59.12	11	106.10
10	Edrian Paul Celestino	164.59	10	55.79	9	108.80
11	Alec Guinzbourg	155.60	15	49.19	10	106.41
12	Antoine Goyette	149.48	12	54.74	12	94.74
13	Brian Chiem	148.93	11	55.10	13	93.83
14	Damien Bueckert	139.93	14	51.10	14	88.83
WD	Aleksa Rakic	WD	7	62.39	Withdrew from competition	

=== Women's singles ===
Women's results
Rank	Skater	Total	SP		FS	
1st place, gold medalist(s)	Madeline Schizas	203.87	1	70.00	1	133.87
2nd place, silver medalist(s)	Sara-Maude Dupuis	182.61	3	59.81	2	122.80
3rd place, bronze medalist(s)	Katherine Medland Spence	181.55	2	61.99	4	119.56
4	Kaiya Ruiter	179.41	8	57.17	3	122.24
5	Breken Brezden	172.66	7	57.67	6	114.99
6	Kara Yun	169.28	12	53.35	5	115.93
7	Megan Woodley	162.54	10	55.12	8	107.42
8	Hetty Shi	160.39	6	58.41	10	101.98
9	Uliana Shiryaeva	158.05	14	47.72	7	110.33
10	Fée-Ann Landry	156.72	5	58.49	13	98.23
11	Justine Miclette	155.92	11	54.85	11	101.07
12	Marie-Maude Pomerleau	154.89	9	55.24	12	99.65
13	Marie-France D'Amour	151.30	15	47.25	9	104.05
14	Amy Shao Ning Yang	146.60	13	53.01	15	93.59
15	Julianne Lussier	139.96	4	59.33	17	80.63
16	Marie-Raphaële Savoie	139.65	18	43.00	14	96.65
17	Grace Johnson	137.77	17	46.40	16	91.37
18	Uma Zagele	110.85	16	47.08	18	63.77

=== Pair skating ===
Pairs' results
Rank	Team	Total	SP		FS	
1st place, gold medalist(s)	Deanna Stellato-Dudek; Maxime Deschamps	207.06	1	76.31	2	130.75
2nd place, silver medalist(s)	Lia Pereira; Trennt Michaud	204.96	2	70.43	1	134.53
3rd place, bronze medalist(s)	Kelly Ann Laurin; Loucas Éthier	187.29	3	63.10	3	124.19
4	Fiona Bombardier; Benjamin Mimar	170.63	4	56.49	4	114.14
5	Jazmine Desrochers; Kieran Thrasher	158.54	5	55.59	5	102.95
6	Cristina Lyons; Marty Haubrich	140.38	6	49.86	6	90.52

=== Ice dance ===
Ice dance results
Rank	Team	Total	RD		FD	
1st place, gold medalist(s)	Piper Gilles; Paul Poirier	229.55	1	91.84	1	137.71
2nd place, silver medalist(s)	Marjorie Lajoie; Zachary Lagha	218.52	2	86.42	2	132.10
3rd place, bronze medalist(s)	Alicia Fabbri; Paul Ayer	195.88	3	78.53	3	117.35
4	Marie-Jade Lauriault; Romain Le Gac	193.28	4	78.09	4	115. 19
5	Lily Hensen; Nathan Lickers	179.83	5	72.80	5	107.03
6	Jamie Fournier; Everest Zhu	166.52	6	65.26	7	101.26
7	Nadiia Bashynska; Peter Beaumont	163.09	9	60.54	6	102.55
8	Alyssa Robinson; Jacob Portz	162.05	7	62.10	8	99.95
9	Alisa Korneva; Kieran MacDonald	150.07	8	60.55	9	89.52
10	Éliane Foroglou-Gadoury; Luke Anderson	119.17	10	40.87	10	78.30

=== Synchronized skating ===
Synchronized results
Rank	Team	Total	SP		FS	
1st place, gold medalist(s)	Les Suprêmes	223.73	1	79.53	2	144.20
2nd place, silver medalist(s)	Nova	220.03	2	75.13	1	144.90
3rd place, bronze medalist(s)	NEXXICE	210.56	3	68.59	3	141.97
4	Black Gold	127.80	4	44.74	4	83.06

== Junior results ==
=== Men's singles ===
Men's results
Rank	Skater	Total	SP		FS	
1st place, gold medalist(s)	David Bondar	196.86	3	61.79	1	135.07
2nd place, silver medalist(s)	Edward Vasii	181.52	2	65.69	4	115.83
3rd place, bronze medalist(s)	David Howes	174.10	1	70.41	10	103.69
4	Parker Heiderich	172.77	6	53.12	2	119.65
5	William Chan	171.87	4	58.28	5	113.59
6	Jake Ellis	170.36	5	58.12	6	112.24
7	David Shteyngart	170.03	9	52.22	3	117.81
8	Liam Schmidt	164.38	7	52.69	7	111.69
9	Louie Fukuda-Wu	161.80	8	52.60	8	109.20
10	Vladimir Furman	158.17	10	51.73	9	106.44
11	James Cha	137.77	11	49.99	12	87.78
12	Kole Sauve	134.75	15	43.80	11	90.95
13	Étienne Lacasse	133.68	12	49.37	16	84.31
14	Nico Conforti	133.09	13	45.75	14	87.34
15	Neo Tran	130.90	16	43.55	13	87.35
16	Tehryn Lee	126.86	17	42.14	15	84.72
17	Christopher Manis	125.04	14	45.71	18	79.33
18	Jonathon Moravec	123.52	18	41.74	17	81.78

=== Women's singles ===
Women's results
Rank	Skater	Total	SP		FS	
1st place, gold medalist(s)	Lia Cho	188.79	1	64.19	1	124.60
2nd place, silver medalist(s)	Ksenia Krouzkevitch	160.97	3	57.28	2	103.69
3rd place, bronze medalist(s)	Sandrine Blais	151.68	2	57.33	4	94.35
4	Reese Rose	148.09	5	49.91	3	98.18
5	Konstantina Lock	143.95	6	49.68	5	94.27
6	Calissa Adlem	139.56	7	48.11	6	91.45
7	Mégane Vallières	138.79	4	51.91	9	86.88
8	Kaylee Sun	133.26	10	45.34	7	87.92
9	Gabrielle Jugnauth	126.64	13	39.56	8	87.08
10	Natasha Hewitt	123.76	14	38.99	10	84.77
11	Kassidy Sinclair	122.26	9	45.75	13	76.51
12	Rebecca Schindel	121.88	11	43.23	12	78.65
13	Sadie Henderson	117.23	8	45.89	17	71.34
14	Kaydee Kallay	115.38	12	42.05	16	73.33
15	Brookelynn Pollock	113.60	18	33.89	11	79.71
16	Eva Sicurella	112.88	15	38.97	15	73.91
17	Laurence Gignac	111.06	17	34.89	14	76.17
18	Séléna Koster	107.36	16	38.51	18	68.85
19	Yaena Nam	78.09	19	32.64	19	45.45

=== Pair skating ===
Pairs' results
Rank	Team	Total	SP		FS	
1st place, gold medalist(s)	Ava Kemp; Yohnatan Elizarov	159.39	1	59.49	1	99.90
2nd place, silver medalist(s)	Martina Ariano Kent; Charly Laliberté Laurent	145.94	3	50.27	2	95.67
3rd place, bronze medalist(s)	Julia Quattrocchi; Simon Desmarais	141.67	4	48.90	3	92.77
4	Noémie Rolland; Étienne Lacasse	139.97	2	50.34	4	89.63
5	Siyul Back; Gavin Mahoney	112.79	5	41.28	5	71.51

=== Ice dance ===
Ice dance results
Rank	Team	Total	RD		FD	
1st place, gold medalist(s)	Chloe Nguyen; Brendan Giang	170.99	1	69.45	2	101.54
2nd place, silver medalist(s)	Sandrine Gauthier; Quentin Thieren	170.61	2	67.35	1	103.26
3rd place, bronze medalist(s)	Layla Veillon; Alexander Brandys	160.22	3	64.23	3	95.99
4	Summer Homick; Nicholas Buelow	144.02	4	56.25	4	87.77
5	Auréa Cinçon-Debout; Earl Jesse Celestino	139.20	6	53.70	5	85.50
6	Laurence Brière; Julien Lévesque	136.20	5	56.01	6	80.19
7	Victoria Carandiuc; Andrei Carandiuc	128.07	10	49.74	8	78.33
8	Charlie Anderson; Cayden Dawson	127.11	11	48.77	7	78.34
9	Rachel Martins; Juel Kowalczyk	126.62	8	51.00	9	75.62
10	Caroline Kravets; Aiden Dotzert	123.27	7	53.41	12	69.86
11	Olympia Kalaganis; Émile Deveau	120.98	14	45.96	10	75.02
12	Anjou Karino; Andrew Song	117.82	12	46.96	11	70.86
13	Audra Gans; Gabriel Liu	108.08	13	45.98	14	62.10
14	Nelly-Anne Chao; Thierry Caron	106.11	15	42.43	13	63.68
WD	Sophia Gover; Billy Wilson-French	WD	9	49.81	Withdrew from competition	

=== Synchronized skating ===
Synchronized results
Rank	Team	Total	SP		FS	
1st place, gold medalist(s)	Les Suprêmes	195.76	1	68.60	1	127.16
2nd place, silver medalist(s)	NEXXICE	186.33	2	67.15	2	119.18
3rd place, bronze medalist(s)	Nova	175.83	3	61.62	3	114.21
4	ICE Ignite	162.20	4	58.93	4	103.27
5	Golding Ice	158.76	5	58.89	5	99.87
6	Gold Ice	146.30	6	58.17	6	88.13
7	Lower Mainland Junior	108.14	7	39.23	7	68.91
