= Lia Cho =

Canadian figure skater

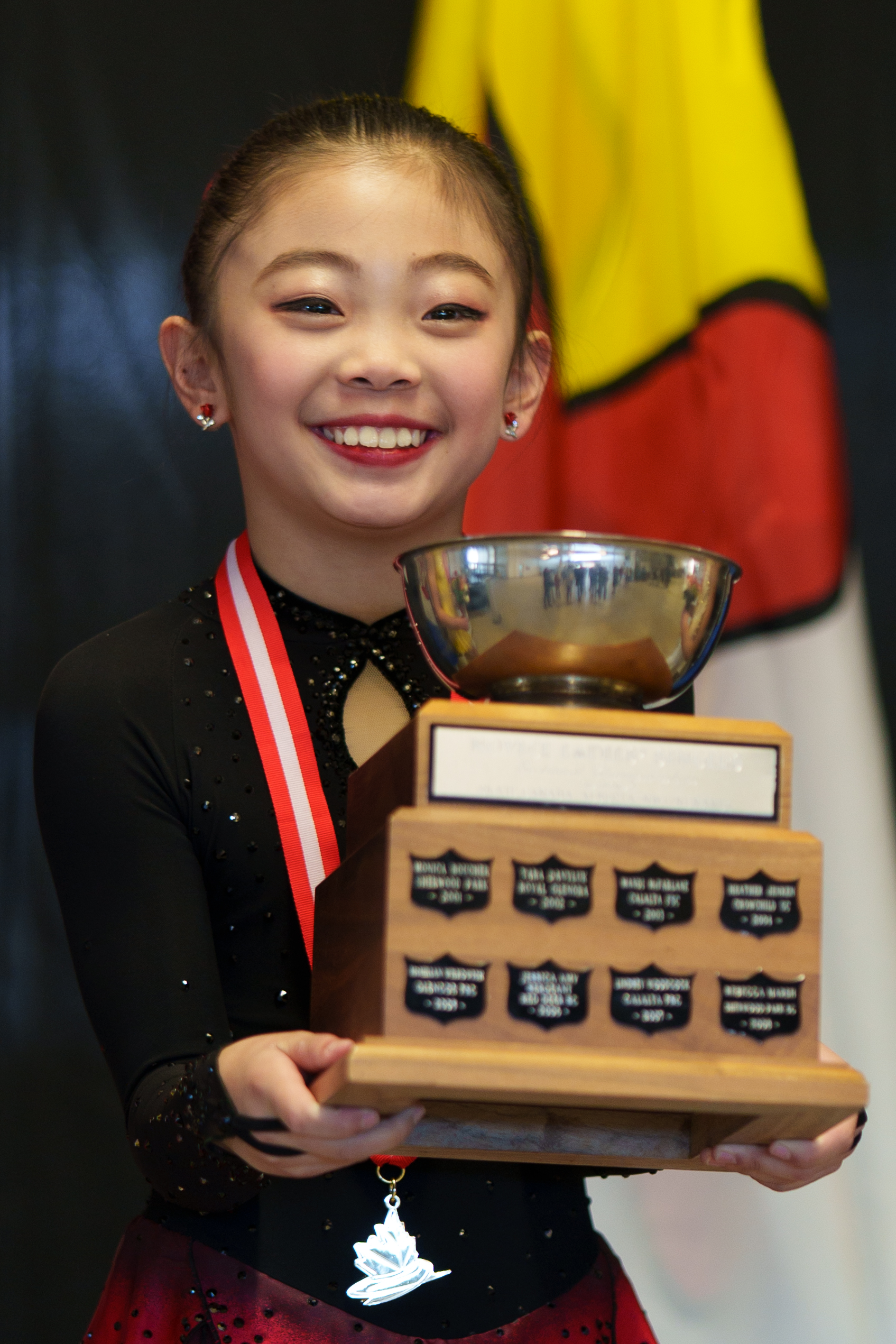
- Lia Cho after winning the 2023 Skate AB/NT/NU Sectional Championship

Personal information
- Other names: 지우
- Born: August 21, 2012 (age 14) Red Deer, Alberta, Canada
- Home town: Calgary, Alberta, Canada
- Height: 1.38 m (4 ft 6 1/2 in)

Figure skating career
- Country: Canada
- Discipline: Women's singles
- Coach: Scott Davis
- Skating club: The Glencoe Club
- Began skating: 2015

Lia Cho is a Canadian junior figure skater. She is a two-time Canadian junior national champion (2025, 2026) and a two-time ISU Junior Grand Prix medalist.

== Personal life ==
Lia Cho was born on August 21, 2012 in Red Deer, Alberta, Canada to parents Ara and Brian Cho. She also has a brother, Lucas, who is two years younger than her. The family moved to Calgary in 2021 due to Cho's father's work.

Cho is currently a student at Mount Royal School. In addition, she is fluent in both English and Korean.

== Career ==
=== Early career ===
Cho began skating at age three at the Red Deer Skating Club in Red Deer, Alberta and was coached by Patti Somer. In 2021, after moving to Calgary with her family, Cho began training at The Glencoe Club under coach Scott Davis.

=== 2023–24 season ===
Cho began her season by making her novice debut in February at the 2023 Skate Canada Challenge, where she won the gold medal. Two weeks later, she competed at the 2024 Canadian Novice Championships, winning the gold medal by almost thirty-three points and setting a new Canadian novice women's record with a total score of 166.56 points.

In April, Cho finished her season by winning the 2024 Triglav Trophy on the novice level.

=== 2024–25 season ===
Cho started her season in August, winning gold on the novice level at the 2024 Cranberry Cup. She followed this up by making her junior debut at the 2024 Skate Canada Challenge, winning the gold medal.

In January, Cho won the 2025 Canadian Junior Championships, setting a Canadian junior women's record in all competition segments with a score of 64.19 in the short program, 124.60 in the free skate, and 188.79 for a combined total score. Two months later, she concluded her season with a gold medal win on the novice level at the 2025 Maria Olszewska Memorial.

=== 2025–26 season ===
Beginning her season in August at the 2025 Cranberry Cup, Cho won the gold medal on the novice level. Three months later, she won another gold medal at the 2025 Skate Canada Challenge on the junior level.

In January, Cho won her second consecutive national title at the 2026 Canadian Junior Championships, breaking her previous Canadian junior women's records with a score of 66.77 in the short program, 132.83 in the free skate, and 199.60 for a combined total score. The following month, she finished her season by winning gold at the 2026 Maria Olszewska Memorial on the novice level.

=== 2026–27 season ===
For the 2026–27 season, Cho became eligible to compete on the junior level internationally and the senior level domestically, welcoming the latter as an opportunity "to compete against everyone who's really good in Canada." She made her junior international debut at the 2026 Cranberry Cup, where she won gold.

Cho was assigned to make her Junior Grand Prix debut at the 2026 JGP Thailand in Bangkok. She placed third in both the short program and the free skate, winning the bronze medal. Speaking afterward, she stated that she "wasn't really expecting to get a medal; my goal was to get top 5. I'm so happy and excited that I podiumed." At her second assignment, the 2026 JPG Poland in Gdańsk, Cho narrowly won the short program. Second in the free skate, she finished second overall, 0.61 points behind Japan's Sumika Kanazawa. Ranking seventh in the women's standings on the Junior Grand Prix, she was named the first alternate for the Junior Grand Prix Final.

== Programs ==
Season	Short program	Free skating	Exhibition
2026–2027	Overture to Die Fledermaus by Johann Strauss II performed by Berlin Philharmonic & Herbert von Karajan choreo. by Jeffrey Buttle	Scheherazade Op. 35 by Nikolai Rimsky-Korsakov; I. Largo e maestoso - Allegro non troppo "The Sea and Sinbad's Ship"; III. Andantino quasi allegretto "The Young Prince and The Young Princess"; IV. Allegro molto "Festival at Baghdad" performed by New York Philharmonic & Alan Gilbert choreo. by Jeffrey Buttle	
2025–2026	Joli Garçon by Pink Martini choreo. by Yuka Sato	Scheherazade Op. 35 by Nikolai Rimsky-Korsakov; I. Largo e maestoso - Allegro non troppo "The Sea and Sinbad's Ship"; III. Andantino quasi allegretto "The Young Prince and The Young Princess"; IV. Allegro molto "Festival at Baghdad" performed by New York Philharmonic & Alan Gilbert choreo. by Jeffrey Buttle	
2024–2025	The Blue Danube by Johann Strauss II performed by Ramin Djawadi choreo. by Jeffrey Langdon	Romeo and Juliet; Epilogue; Adieu (Farewell Love Scene); Parting Is Such Sweet Sorrow; Love Theme from Romeo and Juliet by Nino Rota & City of Prague Philharmonic Orchestra choreo. by Garrett Gosselin	
2023–2024	La La Land; Planetarium; Another Day of Sun by Justin Hurwitz performed by La La Land Cast	The Red Poppy by Reinhold Glière; Op.70: II. Scene and Dance. II. Dance performed by Edward Downes & BBC Philharmonic; III. Scene and Dance with Goldfingers performed by Yuri Fayer & Bolshoi Theatre Orchestra; Act Three: Toa-Hoa's Death performed by André Anichanov & Saint Petersburg Philharmonic Orchestra; Op.70: III. Chinese Dance performed by Edward Downes & BBC Philharmonic	
2022–2023	The Pink Panther; The Pink Panther Theme by Henry Mancini; The Pink Panther Theme (Dance Radio Mix) remixed by Dream Chaser	Anastasia; Finale by David Newman; Once Upon a December by Stephen Flaherty & Liz Callaway	

== Competitive highlights ==
- JGP – Event of the ISU Grand Prix Series
- TBD – Assigned

Competition placements at junior level
Season	2024–25	2025–26	2026–27
Canadian Championships	1st	1st	
JGP Poland			2nd
JGP Thailand			3rd
Cranberry Cup			1st
Skate Canada Challenge	1st	1st	

Competition placements at advanced novice level
Season	2023–24	2024-25	2025-26
Canadian Championships	1st		
Cranberry Cup		1st	1st
Olszewska Memorial		1st	1st
Skate Canada Challenge	1st		
Triglav Trophy	1st		

== Detailed results ==
ISU personal best scores in the +5/-5 GOE System
Segment	Type	Score	Event
Total	TSS	192.75	2026 JGP Thailand
Short program	TSS	69.42	2026 JGP Poland
Short program	TES	40.91	2026 JGP Poland
Short program	PCS	28.84	2026 JGP Thailand
Free skating	TSS	126.03	2026 JGP Thailand
Free skating	TES	68.25	2026 JGP Thailand
Free skating	PCS	57.78	2026 JGP Thailand

=== Junior level ===
Results in the 2024–25 season
Date	Event	SP		FS		Total	
Date	Event	P	Score	P	Score	P	Score
Nov 28 – Dec 1, 2024	2024 Skate Canada Challenge	1	63.35	1	123.15	1	186.50
Jan 14–19, 2025	(Canada) 2025 Canadian Junior Championships	1	64.19	1	124.60	1	188.79

Results in the 2025–26 season
Date	Event	SP		FS		Total	
Date	Event	P	Score	P	Score	P	Score
Nov 27–29, 2025	2025 Skate Canada Challenge	1	64.97	1	122.69	1	187.66
Jan 6–11, 2026	(Canada) 2026 Canadian Junior Championships	1	66.77	1	132.83	1	199.60

Results in the 2026–27 season
Date	Event	SP		FS		Total	
Date	Event	P	Score	P	Score	P	Score
Aug 5–9, 2026	(United States) 2026 Cranberry Cup International	1	64.78	1	116.07	1	180.85
Sep 3–5, 2026	2026 JGP Thailand	3	66.72	3	126.03	3	192.75
Oct 8–10 2026	2026 JGP Poland	1	69.42	2	126.34	2	195.76
