= Aleksa Rakic =

Canadian figure skater (born 2004)

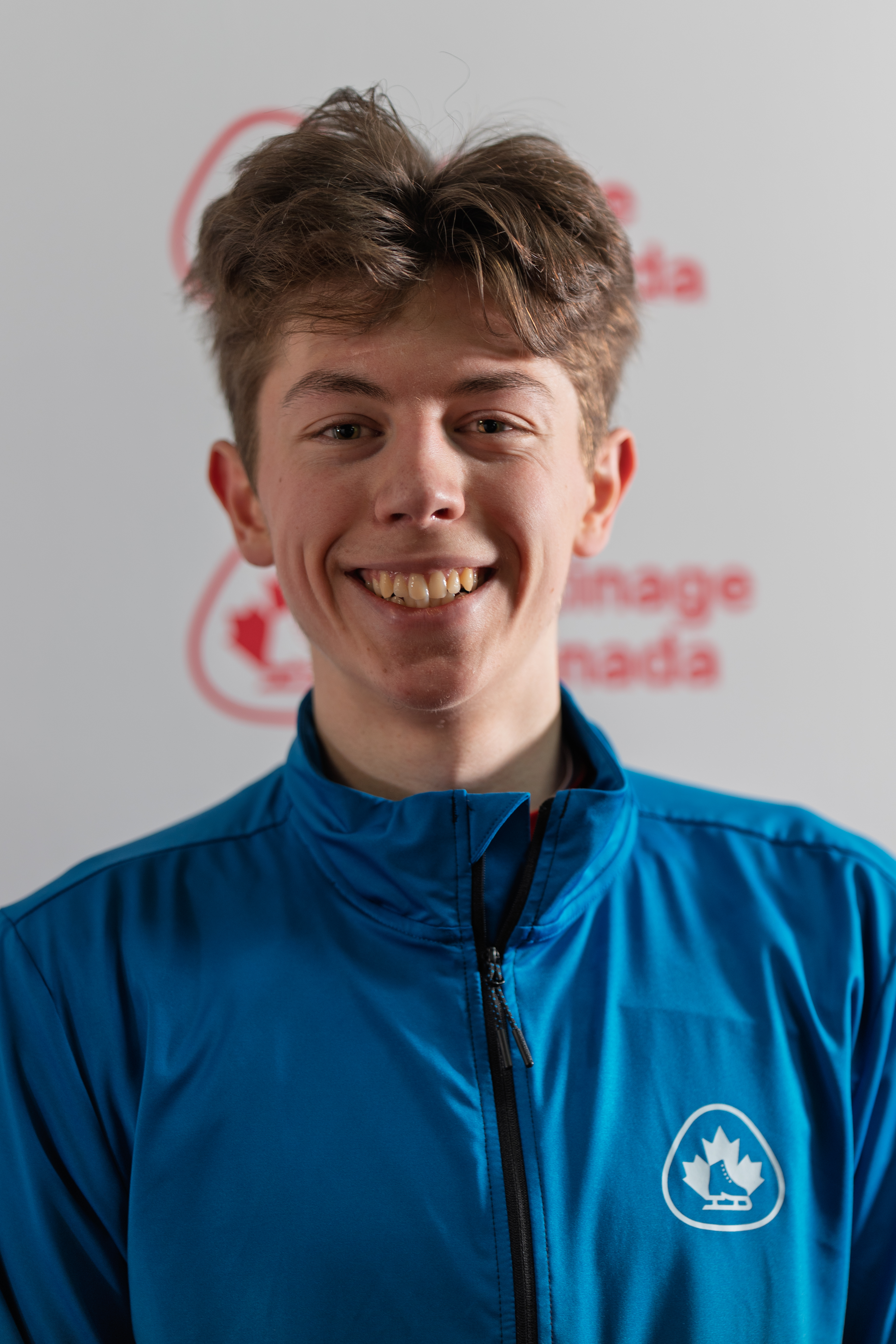
- Aleksa Rakic at the 2024 Canadian Figure Skating Championships

Personal information
- Born: September 14, 2004 (age 22) New Westminster, British Columbia, Canada
- Home town: Burnaby, British Columbia
- Height: 1.80 m (5 ft 11 in)

Figure skating career
- Country: Canada
- Discipline: Men's singles
- Coach: Joanne McLeod
- Skating club: Champs International Skating Center of British Columbia
- Began skating: 2013

Medal record
Canadian Championships
Silver medal – second place	2024 Calgary	Singles
Bronze medal – third place	2026 Gatineau	Singles

Aleksa Rakic (born September 14, 2004) is a Canadian figure skater. He is the 2024 Canadian national silver medalist, the 2026 Canadian national bronze medalist, and the 2019 Canadian Junior national champion.

== Personal life ==
Rakic was born on September 14, 2004, in New Westminster, British Columbia, Canada. In addition to figure skating, he also enjoys reading, biking, drawing, and listening to music.

== Career ==
=== Early career ===
Rakic began figure skating in 2013 after deciding to take lessons with CanSkate, a Canadian learn-to-skate program. His first figure skating coach was Josie Leeworthy before he would eventually begin training under Joanne McLeod at the Champs International Skating Center of BC in Burnaby.

As an advanced novice skater, Rakic won bronze at the 2017 International Challenge Cup and gold at the 2018 Egna Spring Trophy.

=== 2018–19 season ===
Making his junior international debut on the 2018–19 ISU Junior Grand Prix, Rakic finished eighth at 2018 JGP Slovakia and sixth at 2018 JGP Czech Republic. In January, he would win the 2019 Canadian Junior Championship title.

=== 2019–20 season ===
Competing on the Junior Grand Prix circuit for a second time, Rakic won the silver medal at 2019 JGP France and twelfth at 2019 JGP Croatia. Selected to represent Canada at the 2020 Winter Youth Olympics in Lausanne, Switzerland. He would finish fourth in the boys' singles event.

=== 2020–21 season ===
Due to the COVID-19 pandemic, the 2020–21 ISU Junior Grand Prix series and the 2021 Canadian Championships were cancelled. This meant that Rakic was unable to compete for the whole season.

=== 2021–22 season ===
Rakic's only major competition of the season was the 2022 Canadian Championships, where he would finish eighth at the event.

=== 2022–23 season ===
Making his return to the Junior Grand Prix series, Rakic finished seventh at 2022 JGP Czech Republic and fifth at 2022 JGP Italy. Going on to compete at the 2023 Canadian Championships in January, Rakic would finish twelfth. Selected to compete at the 2023 World Junior Championships in Calgary, Rakic finished thirteenth at the event.

=== 2023–24 season ===
Rakic started the season with a silver medal win at the 2023 Cranberry Cup International. He then went on to compete on the 2023–24 ISU Challenger Series, finishing fifth at the 2023 CS Nebelhorn Trophy. Selected to compete at 2023 Skate Canada International following the withdrawal of Roman Sadovsky, Rakic made his senior Grand Prix at the event, finishing in twelfth place.

In January, Rakic competed at the 2024 Canadian Championships, where he won the silver medal behind Wesley Chiu. With this result, he was selected to represent Canada at the 2024 World Junior Championships in Taipei, Taiwan, where he finished eighth. “I am looking back on this season with a lot of things to be proud of,” Rakic summed up.

=== 2024–25 season ===
Rakic began his season by finishing fifth at the 2024 Philadelphia Summer Championships and eighth at the 2024 CS Denis Ten Memorial Challenge. Selected to compete at 2024 Skate Canada International, Rakic finished seventh, scoring new personal best free skate and combined total scores in the process. 2026 Canadian Figure Skating Championships In February, Rakic completed the short program at the 2025 Canadian Championships, finishing seventh in that segment. He withdrew prior to the free skate, however, due to illness. Despite this, Rakic was selected to compete at the 2025 Four Continents Championships, where he finished in sixteenth place. Two months later, Rakic was selected to compete for Team Canada at the 2025 World Team Trophy, finishing eleventh in the men's singles event and Team Canada placing fifth overall.

=== 2025–26 season ===
Rakic opened his season by competing on the 2025–26 Challenger Series, placing seventh at the 2025 CS Kinoshita Group Cup and tenth at the 2025 CS Nepela Memorial. He then went on to finish twelfth at 2025 Skate Canada International and win the bronze medal at the 2025 Skate Canada Challenge.

In January, Rakic won the bronze medal at the 2026 Canadian Championships.

=== 2026–27 season ===
Rakic started his season by finishing sixth at the 2026 CS Nebelhorn Trophy and placing tenth at the 2026 Skate America.

== Programs ==
Season	Short program	Free skating	Exhibition
2018–2019	The Blower's Daughter by Damien Rice choreo. by Mark Pillay, Joanne McLeod, Megan Wing	5 Morceaux de Fantaisie, Op. 3; Piano Concerto No. 3 in D Minor; Piano Concerto No. 2, Op. 18: II. Adagio sostenuto; Piano Concerto No.2 in C Minor, Op.18: 3. Allegro Scherzando by Sergei Rachmaninoff choreo. by Mark Pillay, Joanne McLeod, Megan Wing	
2019–2020	Stargazing by Kygo & Justin Jesso choreo. by Mark Pillay, Joanne McLeod, Megan Wing	5 Morceaux de Fantaisie, Op. 3; Piano Concerto No. 3 in D Minor; Piano Concerto No. 2, Op. 18: II. Adagio sostenuto; Piano Concerto No.2 in C Minor, Op.18: 3. Allegro Scherzando by Sergei Rachmaninoff choreo. by Mark Pillay, Joanne McLeod, Megan Wing	
2020–2021	Stargazing by Kygo & Justin Jesso choreo. by Mark Pillay, Joanne McLeod, Megan Wing	5 Morceaux de Fantaisie, Op. 3; Piano Concerto No. 3 in D Minor; Piano Concerto No. 2, Op. 18: II. Adagio sostenuto; Piano Concerto No.2 in C Minor, Op.18: 3. Allegro Scherzando by Sergei Rachmaninoff choreo. by Mark Pillay, Joanne McLeod, Megan Wing	
2021–2022	Libertango by Astor Piazzolla performed by Cello Project choreo. by Joanne McLeod, Neil Wilson, Mark Pillay	Alone Together by HAUSER & Damir Urban; Benedictus by Karl Jenkins performed by HAUSER choreo. by Joanne McLeod, Neil Wilson, Mark Pillay	
2022–2023	Halo by Beyoncé performed by Peter Katz choreo. by Joanne McLeod, Neil Wilson	No One Like You by Red Electric choreo. by Mark Pillay	Only the Winds by Ólafur Arnalds choreo. by Joanne McLeod, Neil Wilson
2023–2024	Biblical by Calum Scott; Epiphany by Karl Hugo choreo. by Mark Pillay	No One Like You by Red Electric choreo. by Mark Pillay	Rescue Me by OneRepublic
2024–2025	Biblical by Calum Scott; Epiphany by Karl Hugo choreo. by Mark Pillay	Va, vis et deviens (from Va, vis et deviens) by Armand Amar; Steppe by René Aubry; Uncovered by Joseph William Morgan choreo. by Benoît Richaud	
2025–2026	Punga by Klingande choreo. by Benoît Richaud	Holocene by Bon Iver; The Gallows; The Grotto by Audiomachine choreo. by Benoît Richaud	
2026–2027	Surf Rider by Il Est Vilaine; Lies by Il Est Vilaine & Blackjoy choreo. by Joanne McLeod, Benoît Richaud	Fuori Dal Mondo by Ludovico Einaudi; Autumn Moon by Eternal Eclipse; Dawn of Faith by Eternal Eclipse choreo. by Benoît Richaud	

== Competitive highlights ==
- GP – Event of the ISU Grand Prix Series
- JGP – Event of the ISU Junior Grand Prix Series
- CS – Event of the ISU Challenger Series
- TBD – Assigned
- WD – Withdrew from competition

Competition placements at senior level
Season	2021–22	2022–23	2023–24	2024–25	2025–26	2026-27
Four Continents Championships				16th	14th	
Canadian Championships	8th	12th	2nd	WD	3rd	
World Team Trophy				5th (11th)		
GP Skate America						10th
GP Skate Canada			12th	7th	12th	
CS Denis Ten Memorial				8th		
CS Kinoshita Group Cup					7th	
CS Nebelhorn Trophy			5th			6th
CS Nepela Memorial					10th	
Cranberry Cup			4th			
Philadelphia Summer				5th		
Skate Canada Challenge	2nd	6th	2nd	1st	3rd	

Competition placements at junior level
Season	2018–19	2019–20	2022–23	2023–24
Winter Youth Olympics		4th		
World Junior Championships			13th	8th
Canadian Championships	1st			
JGP Croatia		12th		
JGP Czech Republic	6th		7th	
JGP France		2nd		
JGP Italy			5th	
JGP Slovakia	8th			

== Detailed results ==
ISU personal best scores in the +5/-5 GOE System
Segment	Type	Score	Event
Total	TSS	222.49	2024 Skate Canada International
Short program	TSS	80.56	2026 CS Nebelhorn Trophy
Short program	TES	45.07	2026 CS Nebelhorn Trophy
Short program	PCS	36.66	2025 CS Kinoshita Group Cup
Free skating	TSS	145.75	2024 Skate Canada International
Free skating	TES	78.75	2023 CS Nebelhorn Trophy
Free skating	PCS	72.93	2026 CS Nebelhorn Trophy

=== Senior level ===
Results in the 2021–22 season
Date	Event	SP		FS		Total	
Date	Event	P	Score	P	Score	P	Score
Dec 1–5, 2021	2021 Skate Canada Challenge	3	72.03	3	133.03	2	205.06
Jan 7–13, 2022	(Canada) 2022 Canadian Championships	13	61.47	7	131.68	8	193.15

Results in the 2022–23 season
Date	Event	SP		FS		Total	
Date	Event	P	Score	P	Score	P	Score
Nov 30 – Dec 3, 2022	2022 Skate Canada Challenge	11	50.01	2	141.96	6	191.97
Jan 9–15, 2023	(Canada) 2023 Canadian Championships	10	68.51	14	117.26	12	185.77

Results in the 2023–24 season
Date	Event	SP		FS		Total	
Date	Event	P	Score	P	Score	P	Score
Aug 10–14, 2023	(United States) 2023 Cranberry Cup International	7	69.13	4	133.69	4	202.82
Sep 20–23, 2023	(Germany) 2023 CS Nebelhorn Trophy	7	65.03	5	144.85	5	209.88
Oct 27–29, 2023	2023 Skate Canada International	9	72.56	12	116.82	12	189.38
Nov 29 – Dec 3, 2023	2023 Skate Canada Challenge	2	77.11	2	139.81	2	216.92
Jan 8–14, 2024	(Canada) 2024 Canadian Championships	2	75.49	1	149.90	2	225.39

Results in the 2024–25 season
Date	Event	SP		FS		Total	
Date	Event	P	Score	P	Score	P	Score
Oct 3–5, 2024	(Kazakhstan) 2024 CS Denis Ten Memorial Challenge	13	56.06	7	142.41	8	198.47
Oct 25–27, 2024	2024 Skate Canada International	9	76.74	6	145.75	7	222.49
Jan 14–19, 2025	(Canada) 2025 Canadian Championships	7	62.39	—N/a	—N/a	–	WD
Feb 19–23, 2025	(South Korea) 2025 Four Continents Championships	12	69.35	16	128.56	16	197.91
Apr 17–20, 2025	(Japan) 2025 World Team Trophy	10	72.86	11	130.60	5 (11)	203.46

Results in the 2025–26 season
Date	Event	SP		FS		Total	
Date	Event	P	Score	P	Score	P	Score
Sep 5–7, 2025	(Japan) 2025 CS Kinoshita Group Cup	10	78.73	8	142.45	7	221.18
Sep 25–27, 2025	(Slovakia) 2025 CS Nepela Memorial	10	71.76	10	139.15	10	210.91
Oct 31 – Nov 2, 2025	2025 Skate Canada International	12	75.50	12	141.40	12	216.90
Nov 27–29, 2025	2025 Skate Canada Challenge	6	69.08	1	150.47	3	219.55
Jan 6–11, 2026	(Canada) 2026 Canadian Championships	3	83.60	3	162.42	3	246.02
Jan 21–25, 2026	(China) 2026 Four Continents Championships	16	68.83	12	144.35	14	213.18

Results in the 2026–27 season
Date	Event	SP		FS		Total	
Date	Event	P	Score	P	Score	P	Score
Sep 24–26, 2026	(Germany) 2026 CS Nebelhorn Trophy	2	80.56	7	139.22	6	219.78
Nov 13–15, 2026	(United States) 2026 Skate America	10	68.92	11	138.22	10	207.14

=== Junior level ===
Results in the 2018–19 season
Date	Event	SP		FS		Total	
Date	Event	P	Score	P	Score	P	Score
Aug 22–25, 2018	2018 JGP Slovakia	8	60.79	8	119.34	8	180.13
Sep 26–29, 2018	2018 JGP Czech Republic	6	66.01	7	119.07	6	185.08
Jan 13–20, 2019	(Canada) 2019 Canadian Championships (Junior)	2	68.44	1	130.66	1	199.10

Results in the 2019–20 season
Date	Event	SP		FS		Total	
Date	Event	P	Score	P	Score	P	Score
Aug 21–24, 2019	2019 JGP France	3	69.54	3	131.17	2	200.71
Sep 25–28, 2019	2019 JGP Croatia	14	52.57	10	111.96	12	164.53
Jan 10–15, 2020	(Switzerland) 2020 Winter Youth Olympics	4	70.96	4	134.27	4	205.23

Results in the 2022–23 season
Date	Event	SP		FS		Total	
Date	Event	P	Score	P	Score	P	Score
Aug 31 – Sep 3, 2022	2022 JGP Czech Republic	7	65.33	7	117.49	7	182.82
Oct 11–15, 2022	2022 JGP Italy	5	71.50	8	126.06	5	197.56
Feb 27 – Mar 5, 2023	(Canada) 2023 World Junior Championships	11	71.34	11	129.60	13	200.94

Results in the 2023–24 season
Date	Event	SP		FS		Total	
Date	Event	P	Score	P	Score	P	Score
Feb 26 – Mar 3, 2024	(Taiwan) 2024 World Junior Championships	4	77.74	9	134.00	8	211.74
