= 2026 Canadian National Skating Championships =

2026 Canadian Figure Skating Championships
- Type: National championships
- Date: 5 January – 11
- Season: 2025–26
- Location: Gatineau, Quebec
- Host: Skate Canada
- Venue: Centre Slush Puppie

Champions
- Men's singles: Stephen Gogolev (Senior) & Parker Heiderich (Junior)
- Women's singles: Madeline Schizas (Senior) & Lia Cho (Junior)
- Pairs: Lia Pereira and Trennt Michaud (Senior) & Julia Quattrocchi and Étienne Lacasse (Junior)
- Ice dance: Piper Gilles and Paul Poirier (Senior) & Layla Veillon and Alexander Brandys (Junior)
- Synchronized skating: Les Suprêmes (Senior) & NEXXICE (Junior)
- Previous: 2025 Canadian Championships
- Next: 2027 Canadian Championships

The 2026 Canadian National Skating Championships (French: Championnats nationaux canadiens de patinage) were held from 5 to 11 January 2026 at the Centre Slush Puppie in Gatineau, Quebec. Medals were awarded in men's singles, women's singles, pair skating, ice dance, and synchronized skating at the senior and junior levels. The results were part of the Canadian selection criteria for the 2026 Winter Olympics, 2026 World Championships, 2026 Four Continents Championships, and 2026 World Junior Championships.

At the senior level, Stephen Gogolev won the men's event, Madeline Schizas won the women's event, Lia Pereira and Trennt Michaud won the pairs event, Piper Gilles and Paul Poirier won the ice dance event, and Les Suprêmes won the synchronized event. At the junior level, Parker Heiderich won the men's event, Lia Cho won the women's event, Julia Quattrocchi and Étienne Lacasse won the pairs event, Layla Veillon and Alexander Brandys won the ice dance event, and NEXXICE won the synchronized event.

== Background ==
The Canadian National Skating Championships (French: Championnats nationaux canadiens de patinage) are an annual figure skating competition organized by Skate Canada to crown the national champions of Canada. While the first official Canadian Championships were held in 1914, unofficial championships had been hosted by the Minto Skating Club in Ottawa since 1905. Beginning in 2023, the junior- and senior-level synchronized skating competitions were incorporated into the Canadian Figure Skating Championships. The 2026 Canadian Championships were held from 5 to 11 January 2026 at the Centre Slush Puppie in Gatineau, Quebec.

== Required performance elements ==
=== Single skating ===
Men and women competing in single skating first performed a short program. Junior men and women performed their short programs on Tuesday, 6 January. Senior men performed their short programs on Friday, 9 January, while senior women performed theirs on Saturday, 10 January. Lasting no more than 2 minutes 40 seconds, the short program had to include the following elements:

For junior men: one double or triple Axel; one double or triple loop; one jump combination consisting of a double jump and a triple jump or two triple jumps; one flying sit spin; one camel spin with a change of foot; one spin combination with a change of foot; and a step sequence using the full ice surface.

For senior men: one double or triple Axel; one triple or quadruple jump; one jump combination consisting of a double jump and a triple jump, two triple jumps, or a quadruple jump and a double jump or triple jump; one flying spin; one camel spin or sit spin with a change of foot; one spin combination with a change of foot; and a step sequence using the full ice surface.

For junior women: one double Axel; one double or triple loop; one jump combination consisting of two double jumps, one double jump and one triple jump, or two triple jumps; one flying sit spin; one layback spin, sideways leaning spin, or camel spin without a change of foot; one spin combination with a change of foot; and one step sequence using the full ice surface.

For senior women: one double or triple Axel; one triple jump; one jump combination consisting of a double jump and a triple jump, or two triple jumps; one flying spin; one layback spin, sideways leaning spin, camel spin, or sit spin without a change of foot; one spin combination with a change of foot; and one step sequence using the full ice surface.

Men and women in single skating finished their competition with the free skating segment. Junior men and women performed their free skates on Wednesday, 7 January. Senior men performed their free skates on Saturday, 10 January, while senior women performed theirs on Sunday, 11 January. The free skate for both men and women could last no more than 4 minutes, and had to include the following:

For junior men and women: seven jump elements, of which one had to be an Axel-type jump; three spins, of which one had to be a spin combination, one had to be a flying spin, and one had to be a spin with only one position; and a choreographic sequence.

For senior men and women: seven jump elements, of which one had to be an Axel-type jump; three spins, of which one had to be a spin combination, one had to be a flying spin, and one had to be a spin with only one position; a step sequence; and a choreographic sequence.

=== Pair skating ===
Couples competing in pair skating also first performed a short program. Junior pair teams performed their short program on Tuesday, 6 January, while senior teams performed theirs on Friday, 9 January. Lasting no more than 2 minutes 40 seconds, it had to include the following elements:

For junior couples: one pair lift, one double or triple twist lift, one double or triple toe loop or flip/Lutz throw jump, one double loop or double Axel solo jump, one solo spin combination with a change of foot, one death spiral, and a step sequence using the full ice surface.

For senior couples: one pair lift, one double or triple twist lift, one double or triple throw jump, one double or triple solo jump, one solo spin combination with a change of foot, one death spiral, and a step sequence using the full ice surface.

Junior couples performed their free skates on Thursday, 8 January, while senior couples performed theirs on Saturday, 10 January. The free skate could last no more than 4 minutes, and had to include the following:

For junior couples: two pair lifts, one twist lift, two different throw jumps, one solo jump, one jump combination or sequence, one pair spin combination, one death spiral, and a choreographic sequence.

For senior couples: three pair lifts, one twist lift, two different throw jumps, one solo jump, one jump combination or sequence, one pair spin combination, one death spiral, and a choreographic sequence.

=== Ice dance ===
Couples competing in ice dance first performed a rhythm dance. Junior couples performed their rhythm dances on Tuesday, 6 January, while senior couples performed theirs on Saturday, 10 January. Lasting no more than 2 minutes 50 seconds, the theme of the rhythm dance this season was "music, dance styles, and feeling of the 1990s". Examples of applicable dance styles and music included pop, Latin, house, techno, hip-hop, and grunge. The rhythm dance had to include the following elements:

For junior couples: one sequence of the rhumba followed immediately by one sequence of the quickstep, one dance lift, one set of sequential twizzles, and one step sequence while not touching.

For senior couples: one pattern dance step sequence, one choreographic rhythm sequence, one dance lift, one set of sequential twizzles, and one step sequence while not touching.

Junior ice dance teams performed their free dances on Wednesday, 7 January, while senior teams performed theirs on Sunday, 11 January. The free dance could last no longer than 3 minutes 30 seconds for juniors, or 4 minutes for seniors, and had to include the following:

For junior couples: two dance lifts or one combination lift, one dance spin, one set of synchronized twizzles, one step sequence in hold, one turns sequence while on one skate and not touching, and two choreographic elements.

For senior couples: three dance lifts or one dance lift and one combination lift, one dance spin, one set of synchronized twizzles, one step sequence in hold, one turns sequence while on one skate and not touching, and three choreographic elements.

=== Synchronized skating ===
Teams competing in synchronized skating first performed a short program. Junior and senior teams performed their short programs on Thursday, 8 January. Lasting no more than 2 minutes 50 seconds, it had to include the following elements:

For junior teams: one intersection element, one move element, one no hold element as an open block, one twizzle element, and one pivoting element as a closed block using three lines as equal as possible.

For senior teams: one intersection element, one move element, one no hold element as a closed block, one synchronized spin element, and one traveling element.

Junior and senior synchronized skating teams performed their free skates on Friday, 9 January. The free skate could last no longer than 3 minutes 30 seconds for junior teams, or 4 minutes for senior teams, and had to include the following elements:

For junior teams: one artistic element in block or line, one group lift creative element, two different intersection elements, one move element or one pair element, one no hold element as a closed block with a required step sequence, one synchronized spin element, and one traveling element.

For senior teams: one intersection creative element, one lift creative element, one group lift element, one intersection element, one move element, one no hold element in closed or open block with a required step sequence, one pair element, one pivoting element in closed block using a pyramid or diamond shape, and one twizzle element.

== Judging ==
Skaters were judged according to the required technical elements of their program (such as jumps and spins), as well as the overall presentation of their program, based on three program components (skating skills, presentation, and composition). Each technical element in a figure skating performance was assigned a predetermined base point value and scored by a panel of nine judges on a scale from −5 to +5 based on the quality of its execution. Each Grade of Execution (GOE) from –5 to +5 was assigned a value as indicated on the Scale of Values. For example, a triple Axel was worth a base value of 8.00 points, and a GOE of +3 was worth 2.40 points, so a triple Axel with a GOE of +3 earned 10.40 points. The judging panel's GOE for each element was determined by calculating the trimmed mean (the average after discarding the highest and lowest scores). The panel's scores for all elements were added together to generate a Total Elements Score. At the same time, the judges evaluated each performance based on the five aforementioned program components and assigned each a score from 0.25 to 10 in 0.25-point increments. The judging panel's final score for each program component was also determined by calculating the trimmed mean. Those scores were then multiplied by the factor shown on the chart below; the results were added together to generate a total Program Component Score.

Program component factoring
| Discipline | Short program or Rhythm dance | Free skate or Free dance |
|---|---|---|
| Men | 1.67 | 3.33 |
| Women | 1.33 | 2.67 |
| Pairs | 1.33 | 2.67 |
| Ice dance | 1.33 | 2.00 |
| Synchronized | 1.33 | 2.67 |

Deductions were applied for certain violations, such as time infractions, stops and restarts, or falls. The Total Elements Score and Program Component Score were then added together, minus any deductions, to generate a final performance score for each skater or team.

== Medal summary ==
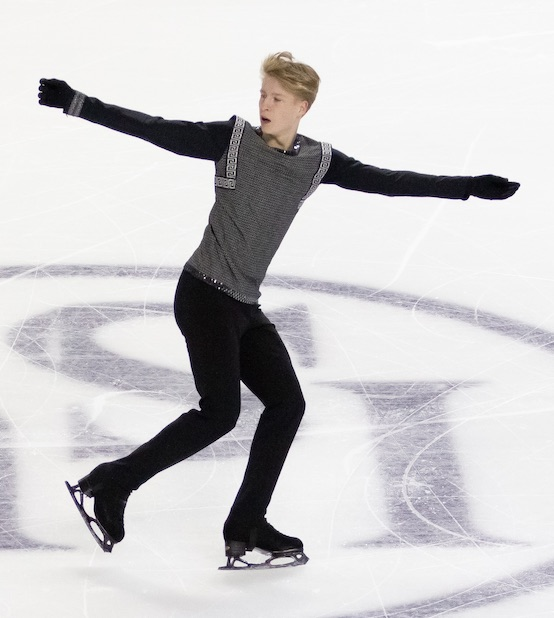
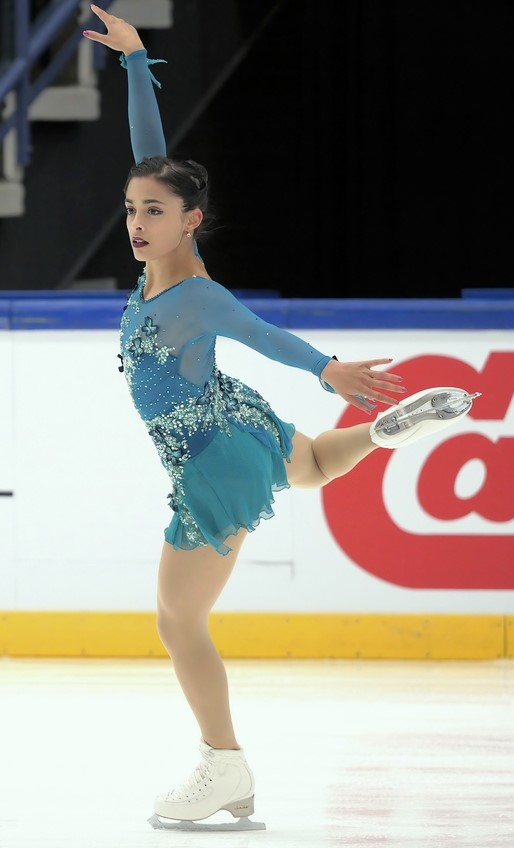
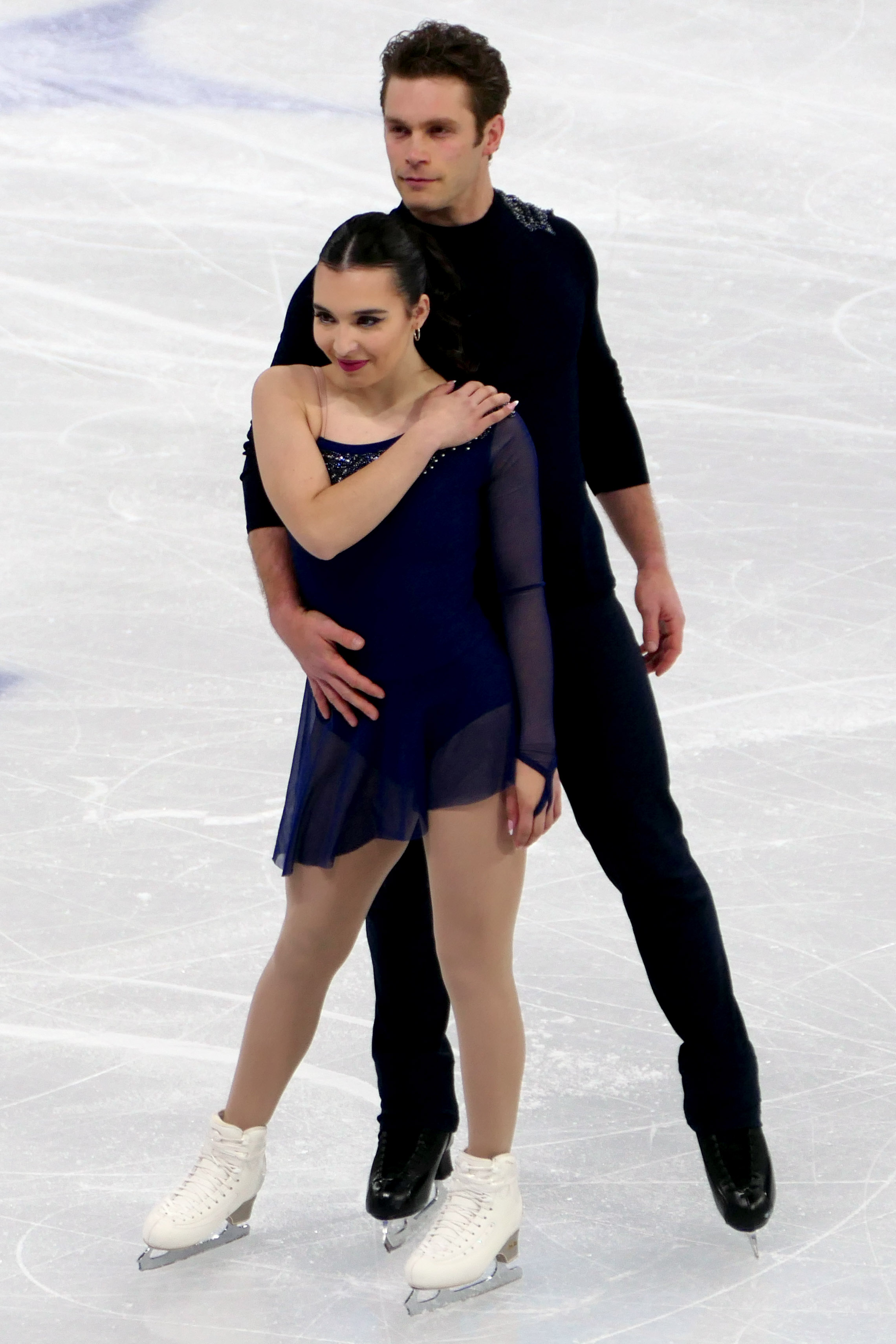
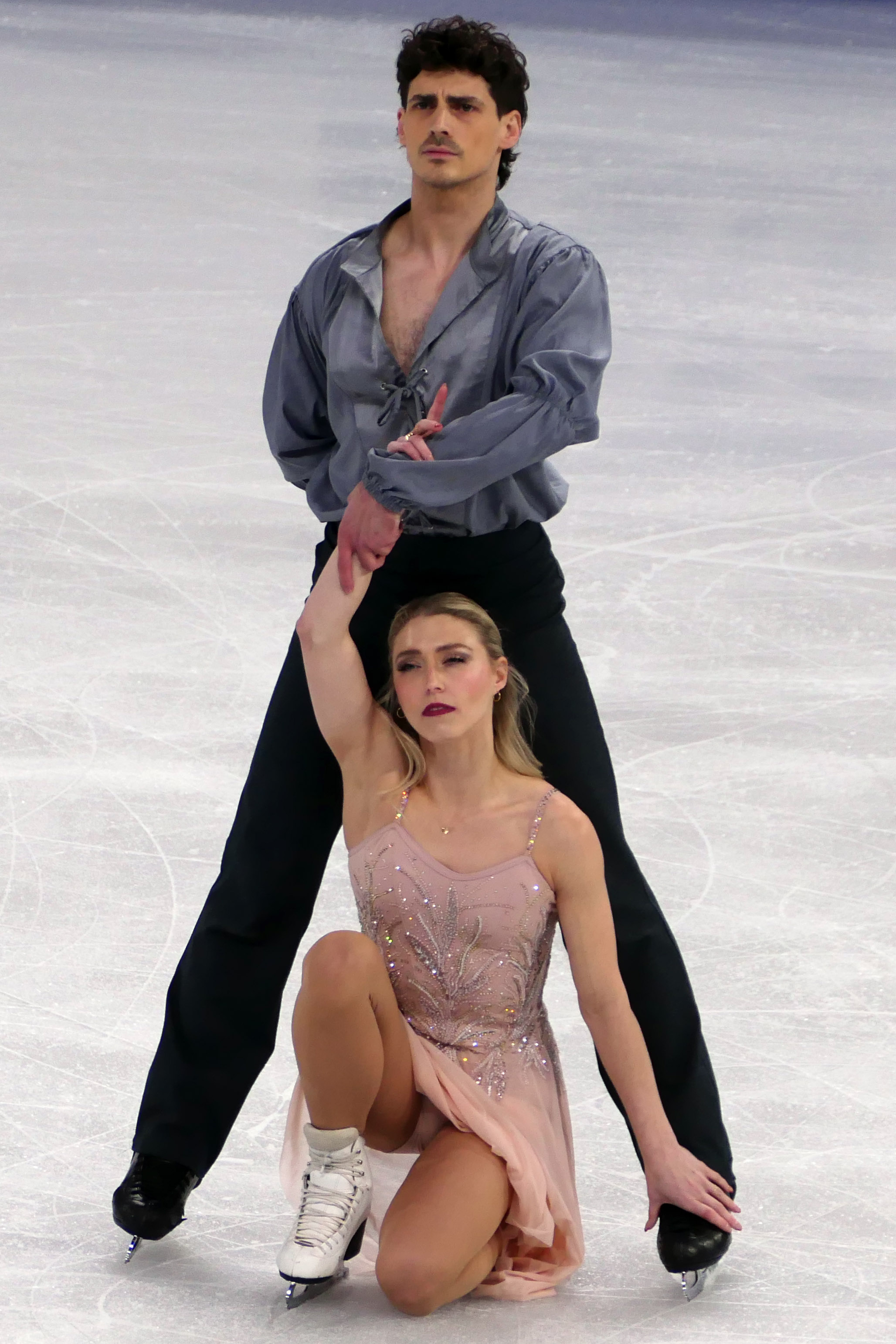
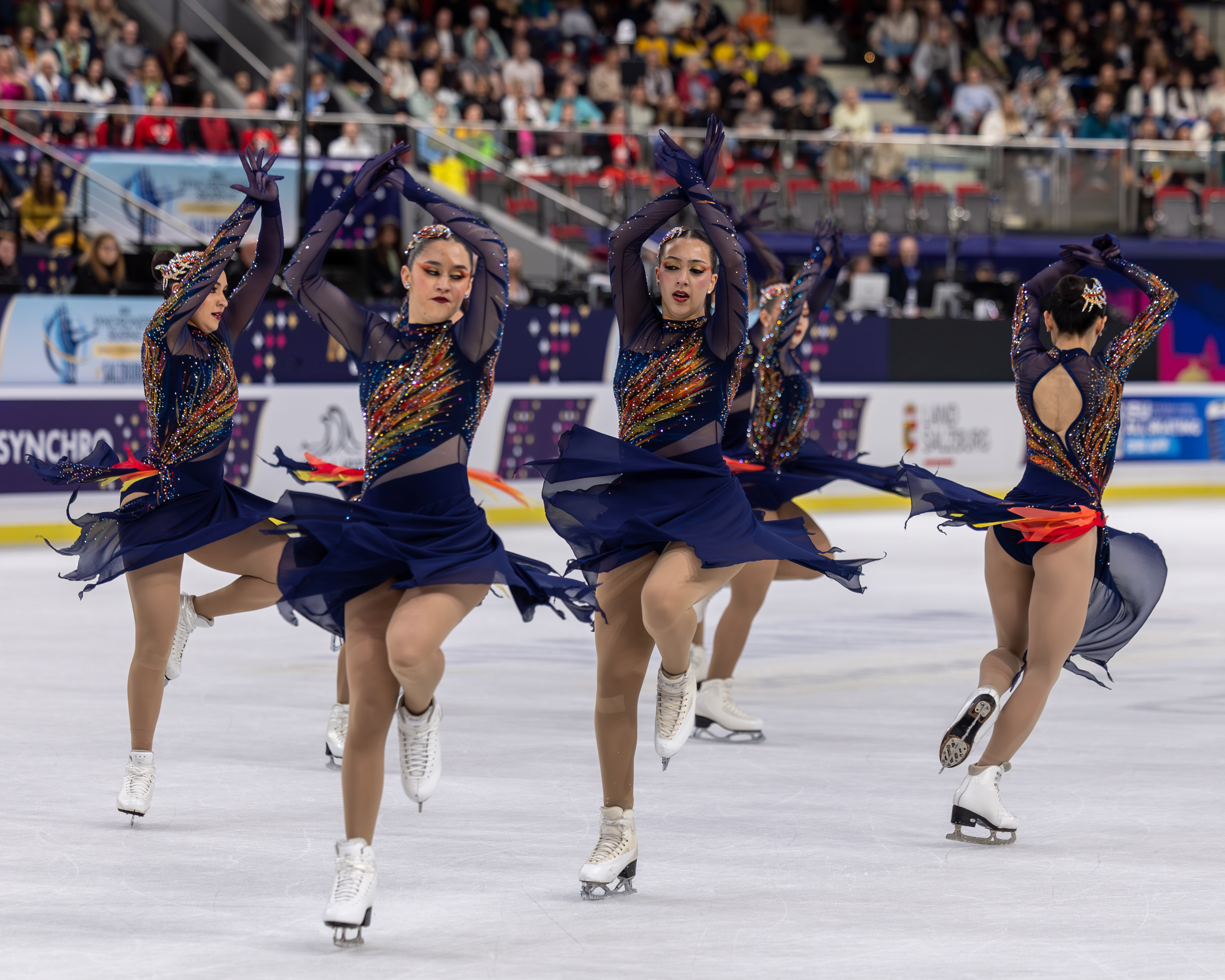
From left to right: The 2026 Canadian figure skating champions: Stephen Gogolev (men's singles); Madeline Schizas (women's singles); Lia Pereira and Trennt Michaud (pair skating); Piper Gilles and Paul Poirier (ice dance); and Les Suprêmes (synchronized skating)

=== Senior medallists ===
Senior medal recipients
| Discipline | Gold | Silver | Bronze |
|---|---|---|---|
| Men | Stephen Gogolev | Roman Sadovsky | Aleksa Rakic |
| Women | Madeline Schizas | Gabrielle Daleman | Minsol Kwon |
| Pairs | Lia Pereira; Trennt Michaud | Deanna Stellato-Dudek; Maxime Deschamps | Kelly Ann Laurin; Loucas Éthier |
| Ice dance | Piper Gilles; Paul Poirier | Marjorie Lajoie; Zachary Lagha | Marie-Jade Lauriault; Romain Le Gac |
| Synchronized skating | Les Suprêmes | Nova | NEXXICE |

=== Junior medallists ===
Junior medal recipients
| Discipline | Gold | Silver | Bronze |
|---|---|---|---|
| Men | Parker Heiderich | William Chan | James Cha |
| Women | Lia Cho | Victoria Barakhtina | Quinn Startek |
| Pairs | Julia Quattrocchi; Étienne Lacasse | Brianna Dion; Jacob Cote | Rebecca Laiu; Marty Haubrich |
| Ice dance | Layla Veillon; Alexander Brandys | Summer Homick; Nicholas Buelow | Charlie Anderson; Cayden Dawson |
| Synchronized skating | NEXXICE | Les Suprêmes | Nova |

== Senior results ==
=== Men's singles ===
After a series of injuries kept him out of competition for years, Stephen Gogolev captured his first Canadian Championship title, winning both the short program and the free skate. "The past couple of years have been quite a struggle," Gogolev stated. "Coming back this season is very special." As a junior skater, Gogolev had been dubbed "the next great Canadian men's hope" before a growth spurt and back injuries derailed his progress. "There were definitely a lot of doubts in my mind in the past few years," Gogolev said. "There were even times where I thought maybe it's not worth continuing doing because it was year after year where I wasn't able to perform and compete the way I wanted to or even compete at all." Gogolev defeated Roman Sadovsky, who finished in second place. With Canada only allotted one entrant in the men's event at the 2026 Winter Olympics, Gogolev and Sadovsky were considered the two likeliest candidates. Sadovsky broke down and began crying upon completion of his free skate. "I was surprised how emotional I got at the end, but it was just such a roller-coaster this whole year," Sadovsky said. He had trailed Gogolev by nearly eighteen points after the short program. Aleksa Rakic finished in third place.

Senior men's results
| Rank | Skater | Total | SP | | FS | |
|---|---|---|---|---|---|---|
| 1st place, gold medalist(s) | Stephen Gogolev | 275.50 | 1 | 99.60 | 1 | 175.90 |
| 2nd place, silver medalist(s) | Roman Sadovsky | 255.10 | 4 | 81.79 | 2 | 173.31 |
| 3rd place, bronze medalist(s) | Aleksa Rakic | 246.02 | 3 | 83.60 | 3 | 162.42 |
| 4 | Wesley Chiu | 241.48 | 2 | 89.14 | 4 | 152.34 |
| 5 | Keegan Messing | 227.76 | 7 | 79.05 | 5 | 148.71 |
| 6 | John Kim | 219.00 | 6 | 80.01 | 7 | 138.99 |
| 7 | David Bondar | 211.83 | 8 | 75.74 | 9 | 136.09 |
| 8 | Anthony Paradis | 211.70 | 9 | 71.36 | 6 | 140.34 |
| 9 | Matthew Newnham | 210.40 | 6 | 80.00 | 10 | 130.40 |
| 10 | David Li | 206.02 | 12 | 69.78 | 8 | 136.24 |
| 11 | Grayson Long | 195.89 | 11 | 69.85 | 13 | 126.04 |
| 12 | Shohei Law | 194.59 | 13 | 67.58 | 11 | 127.01 |
| 13 | David Shteyngart | 193.98 | 10 | 70.18 | 14 | 123.80 |
| 14 | Bruce Waddell | 186.10 | 17 | 59.27 | 12 | 126.83 |
| 15 | Edward Nicholas Vasii | 180.97 | 14 | 63.44 | 18 | 117.53 |
| 16 | Jake Ellis | 180.21 | 15 | 61.41 | 15 | 118.80 |
| 17 | David Howes | 178.48 | 16 | 60.47 | 17 | 118.01 |
| 18 | Alec Guinzbourg | 176.34 | 18 | 58.14 | 16 | 118.20 |

=== Women's singles ===
"Over my dead body is someone else going to the Olympics," Madeline Schizas said on 9 January 2026. Schizas backed up that statement with what Daniel Rainbird of CBC Sports described as a "near-perfect" free skate and, ultimately achieving victory at the Canadian Championships and earning a spot on the Canadian team for the 2026 Winter Olympics. "I meant it. I wasn't going down without a fight, and I think I proved that today," Schizas said after the free skate. "It wasn't meant in a bad faith sort of way; it was about myself and the fact that I was prepared to fight for what I wanted." Schizas faced stiff competition from Gabrielle Daleman, who had returned to competition this season after having not competed since 2022. "At the end of the day, it took a lot of guts and a lot of courage for me to come back," Daleman stated. "I fought through the entire program... It was great competition. [Schizas] killed it. She knocked it out of the park." Canada could only send one women's singles skater to the 2026 Winter Olympics. "I'm very hard on myself, I wanted this spot, didn't get it," Daleman said. "[I] was extremely proud. I was not able to get out of bed a year ago. I wasn't walking a year, and now I'm again on the national podium after being told I wouldn't skate or walk again." Daleman won the silver medal, having finished in second place in both the short program and the free skate. Minsol Kwon, formerly of South Korea and now competing for Canada, finished in third place.

Senior women's results
| Rank | Skater | Total | SP | | FS | |
|---|---|---|---|---|---|---|
| 1st place, gold medalist(s) | Madeline Schizas | 200.86 | 4 | 64.92 | 1 | 135.95 |
| 2nd place, silver medalist(s) | Gabrielle Daleman | 195.35 | 2 | 66.32 | 2 | 129.03 |
| 3rd place, bronze medalist(s) | Minsol Kwon | 193.18 | 1 | 66.51 | 3 | 126.67 |
| 4 | Megan Woodley | 178.46 | 8 | 59.64 | 5 | 118.82 |
| 5 | Lulu Lin | 174.94 | 12 | 55.72 | 4 | 119.11 |
| 6 | Reese Rose | 174.43 | 6 | 59.99 | 7 | 114.44 |
| 7 | Fée Ann Landry | 174.34 | 11 | 56.56 | 6 | 117.78 |
| 8 | Sara-Maude Dupuis | 169.95 | 3 | 65.74 | 12 | 104.21 |
| 9 | Kaiya Ruiter | 168.62 | 5 | 60.78 | 9 | 107.84 |
| 10 | Marie-Maude Pomerleau | 167.04 | 14 | 55.41 | 8 | 111.63 |
| 11 | Uliana Shiryaeva | 165.76 | 9 | 58.91 | 11 | 105.85 |
| 12 | Breken Brezden | 162.21 | 13 | 55.43 | 10 | 106.78 |
| 13 | Justine Miclette | 158.42 | 7 | 59.76 | 14 | 98.66 |
| 14 | Hetty Shi | 150.78 | 15 | 51.40 | 13 | 99.38 |
| 15 | Sandrine Blais | 145.82 | 16 | 51.28 | 15 | 94.54 |
| 16 | Cristina Lyons | 132.65 | 17 | 45.57 | 17 | 87.08 |
| 17 | Amy Shao Ning Yang | 128.06 | 18 | 37.11 | 16 | 90.95 |
| WD | Katherine Medland Spence | Withdrew | 10 | 56.98 | Withdrew from competition | |

=== Pairs ===
Senior pairs' results
| Rank | Team | Total | SP | | FS | |
|---|---|---|---|---|---|---|
| 1st place, gold medalist(s) | Lia Pereira; Trennt Michaud | 204.14 | 2 | 69.11 | 1 | 135.03 |
| 2nd place, silver medalist(s) | Deanna Stellato-Dudek; Maxime Deschamps | 201.36 | 1 | 78.35 | 3 | 123.01 |
| 3rd place, bronze medalist(s) | Kelly Ann Laurin; Loucas Éthier | 197.41 | 4 | 64.92 | 2 | 132.49 |
| 4 | Ava Kemp; Yohnatan Elizarov | 186.19 | 3 | 65.85 | 4 | 120.34 |
| 5 | Jazmine Desrochers; Kieran Thrasher | 166.71 | 5 | 59.04 | 5 | 107.67 |
| 6 | Miyu Yunoki; Tristan Taylor | 164.59 | 6 | 58.82 | 6 | 105.77 |
| 7 | Eliana Secunda; Thierry Ferland | 131.26 | 7 | 48.54 | 7 | 82.72 |

=== Ice dance ===
Senior ice dance results
| Rank | Team | Total | RD | | FD | |
|---|---|---|---|---|---|---|
| 1st place, gold medalist(s) | Piper Gilles; Paul Poirier | 231.05 | 1 | 93.11 | 1 | 137.94 |
| 2nd place, silver medalist(s) | Marjorie Lajoie; Zachary Lagha | 217.32 | 2 | 86.93 | 2 | 130.39 |
| 3rd place, bronze medalist(s) | Marie-Jade Lauriault; Romain Le Gac | 200.93 | 3 | 78.64 | 3 | 122.29 |
| 4 | Alicia Fabbri; Paul Ayer | 196.12 | 4 | 78.05 | 4 | 118.07 |
| 5 | Alyssa Robinson; Jacob Portz | 175.61 | 5 | 68.81 | 6 | 106.80 |
| 6 | Lily Hensen; Nathan Lickers | 174.85 | 8 | 66.93 | 5 | 107.92 |
| 7 | Jamie Fournier; Everest Zhu | 173.95 | 6 | 68.08 | 7 | 105.87 |
| 8 | Chloe Nguyen; Brendan Giang | 172.44 | 7 | 67.72 | 8 | 104.72 |
| 9 | Sandrine Gauthier; Quentin Thieren | 167.70 | 9 | 66.26 | 9 | 101.44 |
| 10 | Nadiia Bashynska; Noé Perron | 160.33 | 10 | 60.46 | 10 | 99.87 |
| 11 | Alisa Korneva; Kieran MacDonald | 154.71 | 11 | 60.17 | 11 | 94.54 |
| 12 | Amanda Urban; Peter Beaumont | 147.72 | 13 | 54.34 | 12 | 93.38 |
| 13 | Éliane Foroglou-Gadoury; Luke Anderson | 142.07 | 12 | 57.29 | 13 | 84.78 |
| 14 | Lucy Hancockl; Aiden Dotzert | 136.66 | 14 | 54.25 | 14 | 82.41 |
| 15 | Addison Pehl; Daniel Yu | 127.96 | 15 | 48.28 | 15 | 79.68 |

=== Synchronized skating ===
Les Suprêmes of Quebec won their third national championship title in a row, beating out Nova Senior, also of Quebec, who finished in second place, and NEXXICE of Ontario, who finished in third. “We love our national competitions and having all our friends and family here," co-captain Olivia Di Giandomenico stated afterward. "As a team, it’s a really nice win to have in our pocket for the remainder of the season.”

Senior synchronized results
| Rank | Team | Total | SP | | FS | |
|---|---|---|---|---|---|---|
| 1st place, gold medalist(s) | Les Suprêmes | 226.99 | 1 | 81.44 | 1 | 145.55 |
| 2nd place, silver medalist(s) | Nova | 221.78 | 3 | 77.07 | 2 | 144.71 |
| 3rd place, bronze medalist(s) | NEXXICE | 214.66 | 2 | 78.48 | 3 | 136.18 |

== Junior results ==
=== Men's singles ===
Junior men's results
| Rank | Skater | Total | SP | | FS | |
|---|---|---|---|---|---|---|
| 1st place, gold medalist(s) | Parker Heiderich | 188.16 | 1 | 63.74 | 1 | 124.42 |
| 2nd place, silver medalist(s) | William Chan | 172.68 | 4 | 61.09 | 2 | 111.59 |
| 3rd place, bronze medalist(s) | James Cha | 171.42 | 5 | 60.19 | 3 | 111.23 |
| 4 | Ethan Luo | 171.08 | 3 | 61.50 | 4 | 109.58 |
| 5 | Travis Trang | 165.46 | 2 | 63.46 | 6 | 102.00 |
| 6 | Liam Schmidt | 163.35 | 6 | 56.30 | 5 | 107.06 |
| 7 | Christopher Manis | 153.20 | 9 | 51.58 | 7 | 101.62 |
| 8 | Henrick Chan | 143.18 | 8 | 52.79 | 9 | 90.39 |
| 9 | Jake Willing-Sato | 143.12 | 11 | 50.55 | 8 | 92.57 |
| 10 | Jonathon Moravec | 138.36 | 12 | 49.78 | 10 | 88.58 |
| 11 | Petro Chebotarov | 134.77 | 7 | 54.53 | 15 | 80.24 |
| 12 | Lincoln Clarke | 132.20 | 10 | 50.71 | 12 | 81.49 |
| 13 | Nico Conforti | 130.46 | 13 | 48.31 | 11 | 82.15 |
| 14 | James Moskowitz | 127.52 | 15 | 46.93 | 14 | 80.59 |
| 15 | Tehryn Lee | 126.26 | 16 | 45.63 | 13 | 80.63 |
| 16 | Eric Swalm | 111.42 | 14 | 47.81 | 18 | 63.61 |
| 17 | Anthony Pard | 107.58 | 17 | 37.78 | 17 | 69.80 |
| 18 | Tommy Dayong Liu | 105.58 | 18 | 32.68 | 16 | 72.90 |

=== Women's singles ===
Lia Cho won the junior women's singles event. With a combined score of 199.60, Cho broke her Canadian Junior record of 188.79 points set at the 2025 National Championships.

Junior women's results
| Rank | Skater | Total | SP | | FS | |
|---|---|---|---|---|---|---|
| 1st place, gold medalist(s) | Lia Cho | 199.60 | 1 | 66.77 | 1 | 132.83 |
| 2nd place, silver medalist(s) | Victoria Barakhtina | 171.93 | 2 | 61.64 | 2 | 110.29 |
| 3rd place, bronze medalist(s) | Quinn Startek | 157.93 | 5 | 52.79 | 3 | 105.14 |
| 4 | Calissa Adlem | 157.78 | 4 | 54.61 | 4 | 103.17 |
| 5 | Mégane Vallières | 150.53 | 3 | 57.42 | 7 | 93.11 |
| 6 | Uxia Gonzalez-Abraldes | 148.65 | 7 | 51.24 | 5 | 97.41 |
| 7 | Ksenia Krouzkevitch | 144.64 | 6 | 52.18 | 8 | 92.46 |
| 8 | Kaylee Sun | 141.47 | 10 | 46.97 | 6 | 94.50 |
| 9 | Chantalle-Elizabeth Chipilo | 134.52 | 12 | 45.61 | 9 | 88.91 |
| 10 | Yaena Nam | 132.65 | 9 | 47.33 | 10 | 85.32 |
| 11 | Camila Volkova | 131.32 | 8 | 50.73 | 12 | 80.59 |
| 12 | Kaydee Kallay | 127.33 | 13 | 44.98 | 11 | 82.35 |
| 13 | Konstantina Lock | 124.75 | 14 | 44.71 | 13 | 80.04 |
| 14 | Hannah Quinn | 122.56 | 11 | 46.41 | 14 | 76.15 |
| 15 | Alena Kolomiets | 112.13 | 16 | 39.66 | 15 | 72.47 |
| 16 | Mila Marleau | 105.86 | 17 | 36.43 | 16 | 69.43 |
| 17 | Julianne Hébert | 97.02 | 15 | 41.90 | 17 | 55.12 |

=== Pairs ===
Junior pairs' results
| Rank | Team | Total | SP | | FS | |
|---|---|---|---|---|---|---|
| 1st place, gold medalist(s) | Julia Quattrocchi; Étienne Lacasse | 149.97 | 1 | 52.06 | 1 | 97.81 |
| 2nd place, silver medalist(s) | Brianna Dion; Jacob Cote | 131.62 | 2 | 49.41 | 3 | 82.21 |
| 3rd place, bronze medalist(s) | Rebecca Laiu; Marty Haubrich | 130.86 | 4 | 44.99 | 2 | 85.87 |
| 4 | Ava Cheung; Stephen Parc Qu Lee | 127.57 | 3 | 47.62 | 4 | 79.95 |
| 5 | Beau Callahan; Vladimir Furman | 120.27 | 5 | 41.12 | 6 | 79.15 |
| 6 | Amy Ritchie; Mitchell Dunn | 120.19 | 6 | 40.91 | 5 | 79.28 |

=== Ice dance ===
Junior ice dance results
| Rank | Team | Total | RD | | FD | |
|---|---|---|---|---|---|---|
| 1st place, gold medalist(s) | Layla Veillon; Alexander Brandys | 170.33 | 1 | 67.67 | 1 | 102.66 |
| 2nd place, silver medalist(s) | Summer Homick; Nicholas Buelow | 157.78 | 2 | 62.77 | 2 | 95.01 |
| 3rd place, bronze medalist(s) | Charlie Anderson; Cayden Dawson | 146.31 | 3 | 61.23 | 4 | 85.08 |
| 4 | Laurence Brière; Julien Lévesque | 144.99 | 5 | 56.62 | 3 | 88.37 |
| 5 | Auréa Cinçon-Debout; Earl Jesse Celestino | 144.07 | 4 | 59.54 | 5 | 84.53 |
| 6 | Annabelle Théroux; Rafael Gossard | 134.37 | 8 | 51.65 | 7 | 82.72 |
| 7 | Victoria Carandiuc; Andrei Carandiuc | 133.98 | 6 | 53.62 | 10 | 80.36 |
| 8 | Olivia Corneil; Alexandre Emery | 132.97 | 7 | 52.45 | 8 | 80.52 |
| 9 | Madelaine Breau; Kurtis Che | 130.63 | 9 | 50.20 | 9 | 80.43 |
| 10 | Olympia Kalaganis; Émile Deveau | 130.29 | 10 | 47.30 | 6 | 82.99 |
| 11 | Émilie Proulx; Corentin Cincon-Debout | 118.55 | 12 | 46.07 | 11 | 72.78 |
| 12 | Hannah Li; Nathan Feng | 116.84 | 13 | 44.45 | 12 | 72.39 |
| 13 | Anjou Karino; Andrew Song | 116.63 | 11 | 46.43 | 14 | 70.20 |
| 14 | Rilee Eby; Jacob Stark | 107.83 | 15 | 37.51 | 13 | 70.32 |
| 15 | Madison Tong; Michael Boutsan | 100.17 | 14 | 40.63 | 15 | 59.54 |

=== Synchronized skating ===
NEXXICE of Ontario won their first championship title in three years while also setting a new Canadian record. Team leader Tiffany Wang stated “We’re super proud... because we put a lot of hard work into every single practice and it took a lot of effort and a lot of discipline to get to where we are now,”. NEXXICE beat the reigning junior national champions, Les Suprêmes of Quebec, who finished in second place, and Nova of Quebec, who finished in third.

Junior synchronized results
| Rank | Team | Total | SP | | FS | |
|---|---|---|---|---|---|---|
| 1st place, gold medalist(s) | NEXXICE | 197.82 | 1 | 71.38 | 1 | 126.44 |
| 2nd place, silver medalist(s) | Les Suprêmes | 186.88 | 2 | 64.78 | 2 | 122.10 |
| 3rd place, bronze medalist(s) | Nova | 171.94 | 3 | 59.01 | 3 | 112.93 |
| 4 | ICE Ignite | 155.18 | 4 | 54.86 | 4 | 100.32 |
| 5 | Gold Ice | 150.10 | 5 | 54.07 | 6 | 96.03 |
| 6 | Prima | 143.63 | 6 | 45.94 | 5 | 97.69 |
| 7 | Lower Mainland Junior | 121.08 | 7 | 42.64 | 7 | 78.44 |

== International team selections ==
=== Winter Olympics ===
The figure skating events at the 2026 Winter Olympics were held between 6 and 19 February at the Forum di Milano in Milan, Italy. Members of the Canadian delegation to the Olympics were announced on 12 January.

Canadian delegation to the 2026 Winter Olympics
| No. | Men | Women | Pairs | Ice dance |
|---|---|---|---|---|
| 1 | Stephen Gogolev | Madeline Schizas | Lia Pereira; Trennt Michaud | Piper Gilles; Paul Poirier |
| 2 | —N/a | | Deanna Stellato-Dudek; Maxime Deschamps | Marjorie Lajoie; Zachary Lagha |
| 3 | —N/a | | —N/a | Marie-Jade Lauriault; Romain Le Gac |

=== Four Continents Championships ===
The 2026 Four Continents Championships were held from 19 to 24 January in Beijing, China. Members of the Canadian delegation to the Four Continents Championships were announced on 12 January.

Canadian delegation to the 2026 Four Continents Championships
| No. | Men | Women | Pairs | Ice dance |
|---|---|---|---|---|
| 1 | Wesley Chiu | Gabrielle Daleman | Ava Kemp; Yohnatan Elizarov | Alicia Fabbri; Paul Ayer |
| 2 | Aleksa Rakic | Sara-Maude Dupuis | Kelly Ann Laurin; Loucas Éthier | Jamie Fournier; Everest Zhu |
| 3 | Roman Sadovsky | Fée Ann Landry | —N/a | Lily Hensen; Nathan Lickers |

=== World Junior Championships ===
The 2026 World Junior Championships were held from 2 to 8 March in Tallinn, Estonia. Members of the Canadian delegation to the World Junior Championships were announced on 12 January. Ava Kemp and Yohnatan Elizarov, and Jazmine Desroches and Kieran Thrasher, won the gold and silver medals in the pairs' event, respectively.

Canadian delegation to the 2026 World Junior Championships
| No. | Men | Women | Pairs | Ice dance |
|---|---|---|---|---|
| 1 | Grayson Long | Victoria Barakhtina | Jazmine Desrochers; Kieran Thrasher | Summer Homick; Nicholas Buelow |
| 2 | —N/a | | Ava Kemp; Yohnatan Elizarov | Layla Veillon; Alexander Brandys |
| 3 | —N/a | | Julia Quattrocchi; Étienne Lacasse | —N/a |

== Works cited ==
- "Special Regulations & Technical Rules – Single & Pair Skating and Ice Dance 2024" (PDF). International Skating Union. Archived (PDF) from the original on 9 November 2024.
- "Special Regulations & Technical Rules – Synchronized Skating 2024" (PDF). International Skating Union. Archived (PDF) from the original on 18 October 2025.
