= Paul Ayer =

Canadian ice dancer (born 1998)

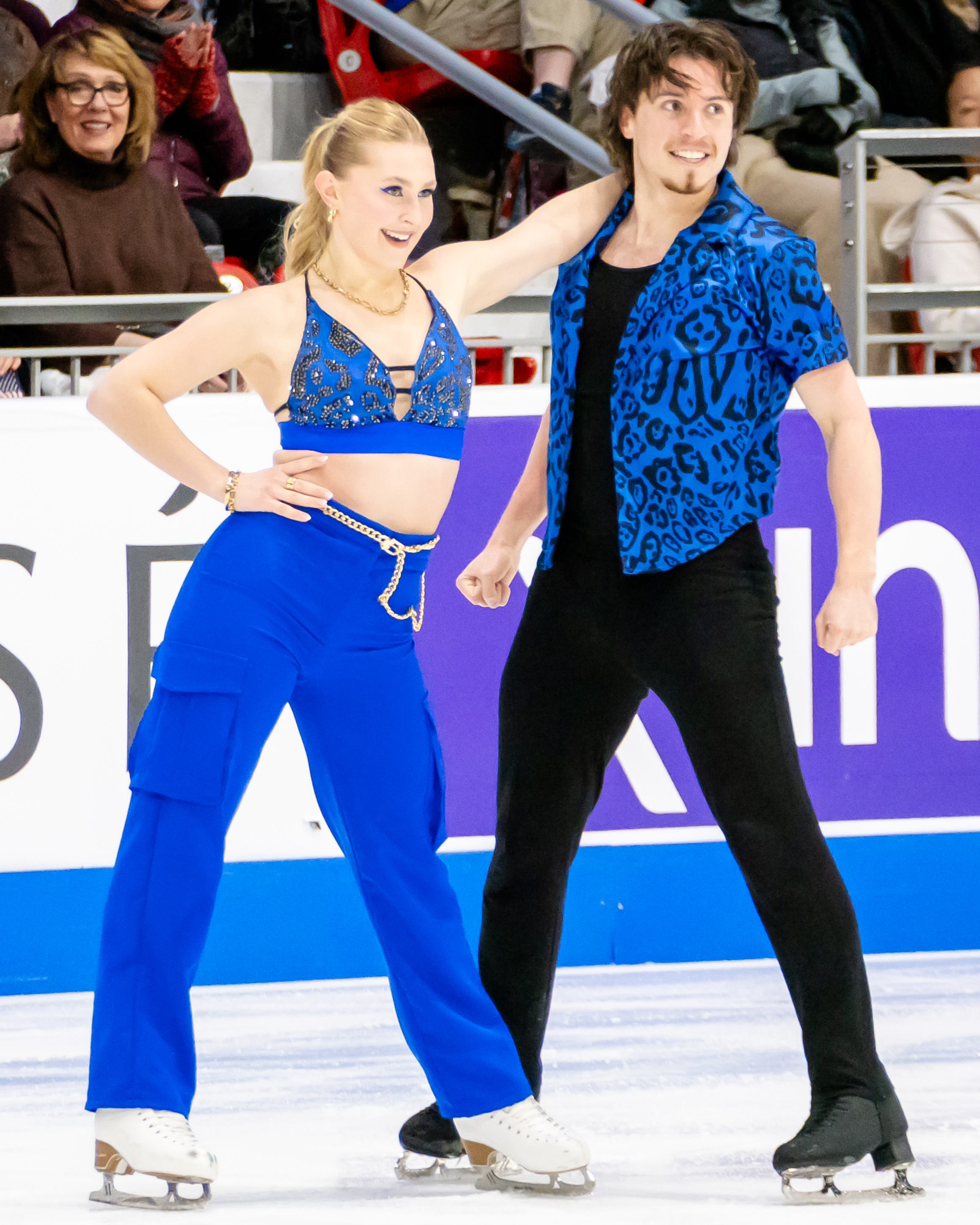
- Alicia Fabbri and Paul Ayer during their rhythm dance at 2025 Skate America

Personal information
- Born: April 6, 1998 (age 28) Calgary, Alberta, Canada
- Home town: Brossard, Quebec
- Height: 1.75 m (5 ft 9 in)

Figure skating career
- Country: Canada
- Partner: Sandrine Gauthier (since 2026); Alicia Fabbri (2018-26)
- Coach: Marie-France Dubreuil; Patrice Lauzon; Romain Haguenauer; Pascal Denis
- Skating club: Calalta Calgary
- Began skating: 2009

Medal record
Canadian Championships
Bronze medal – third place	2024 Calgary	Ice dance
Bronze medal – third place	2025 Laval	Ice dance

Paul Ayer (born April 6, 1998) is a Canadian ice dancer. With his former skating partner, Alicia Fabbri, he is a two-time Canadian national bronze medalist (2024–25) and the 2024 CS Denis Ten Memorial Challenge bronze medalist.

At the junior level, they are the 2019 Canadian national junior silver medalists and the 2019 Bavarian Open junior silver medalists. They placed in the top nine at the 2019 World Junior Championships.

== Personal life ==
Ayer was born on April 6, 1998, in Calgary, Alberta. He is half Mexican-Canadian and speaks Spanish, French and English fluently. He has a younger brother named Alex. Ayer's father, who was a lawyer in Calgary, was diagnosed with early-onset Alzheimer's disease. He has taken online courses and plans to enroll in a university in Montreal in the future.

Ayer enjoys playing other sports with friends like football and hockey on outdoor rinks or lakes during the winter.

In April 2026, Ayer announced that he had acquired Mexican citizenship.

== Career ==
=== Early career ===
Ayer began skating around 2007. He competed in only domestic events with his first three partners: Taylor Yanke, Nicola Salimova, and Jolie Che. Ayer and Che split at the end of the summer in 2017, and he spent about a year trying out with various partners before teaming up with Fabbri. He relocated from Calgary to Montreal to train full-time with Fabbri.

=== Partnership with Fabbri ===
==== 2018–2019 season: Debut of Fabbri/Ayer ====
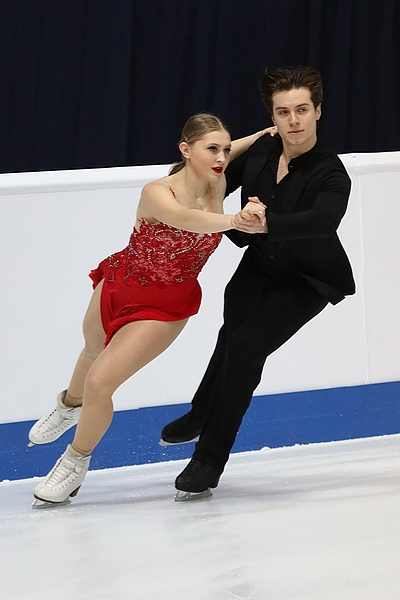
Fabbri/Ayer at the 2019 World Junior Championships

Fabbri/Ayer were assigned to two Junior Grand Prix events in their first season together. They placed fourth at 2018 JGP Slovakia and seventh at 2018 JGP Slovenia.

The team went on to place second at the 2019 Canadian Championships behind Marjorie Lajoie / Zachary Lagha. Together, they were named to the Canadian team for the 2019 World Junior Championships in Zagreb, Croatia. At a tune-up event, the 2019 Bavarian Open, Fabbri/Ayer again won silver behind Lajoie/Lagha.

Fabbri/Ayer were thirteenth after the rhythm dance segment at the 2019 World Junior Championships but rallied with an eighth-place showing in the free dance to place ninth overall. Combined with Lajoie/Lagha's placement (first place), their rank qualified three ice dance spots for Canada at the 2020 World Junior Championships in Tallinn, Estonia.

==== 2019–2020 season: Senior international debut ====
In July 2019, Fabbri/Ayer left coach Julien Lalonde to train with Marie-France Dubreuil, Patrice Lauzon, and Romain Haguenauer in Montreal. They made their senior international debut at the 2019 CS Warsaw Cup, where they placed sixth with personal bests in all segments.

==== 2020–2021 season ====
Fabbri/Ayer were assigned to make their Grand Prix debut at the 2020 Skate Canada International, but the event was cancelled as a result of the coronavirus pandemic.

With the pandemic continuing to make it difficult to hold in-person events, Fabbri/Ayer competed at virtual domestic competitions, placing fifth at the 2021 Skate Canada Challenge. This result would have qualified them for the 2021 Canadian Championships, but they were cancelled due to the pandemic.

==== 2021–2022 season ====
Fabbri/Ayer returned to international competition after almost two years at the 2021 CS Lombardia Trophy, placing twelfth. Given a second Challenger assignment, they were fifth at the 2021 CS Cup of Austria.

At the 2022 Canadian Championships, held in a bubble in Ottawa due to Omicron variant restrictions, Fabbri/Ayer finished in seventh place overall after being hampered by a fall in the closing seconds of their rhythm dance.

==== 2022–2023 season: Grand Prix debut ====
Skate Canada named Fabbri and Ayer to the senior national team for the first time in the lead-up to the new season. They ventured out internationally for the first time at the 2022 CS Budapest Trophy, where they finished in fourth place, 11.60 points behind bronze medalists Wolfkostin/Chen of the United States. Ayer assessed that they had given a "really strong performance in the rhythm dance and connected with the crowd," though faulting themselves for a free dance error. They were then invited to finally make the Grand Prix debut and came eighth at the 2022 MK John Wilson Trophy. Ayer dislocated his shoulder in the practice sessions at the Wilson Trophy and, while they were able to finish the event by making modifications to their program, it was subsequently determined that he required surgery. As a result, they withdrew from the 2023 Canadian Championships.

==== 2023–2024 season: Canadian national bronze ====
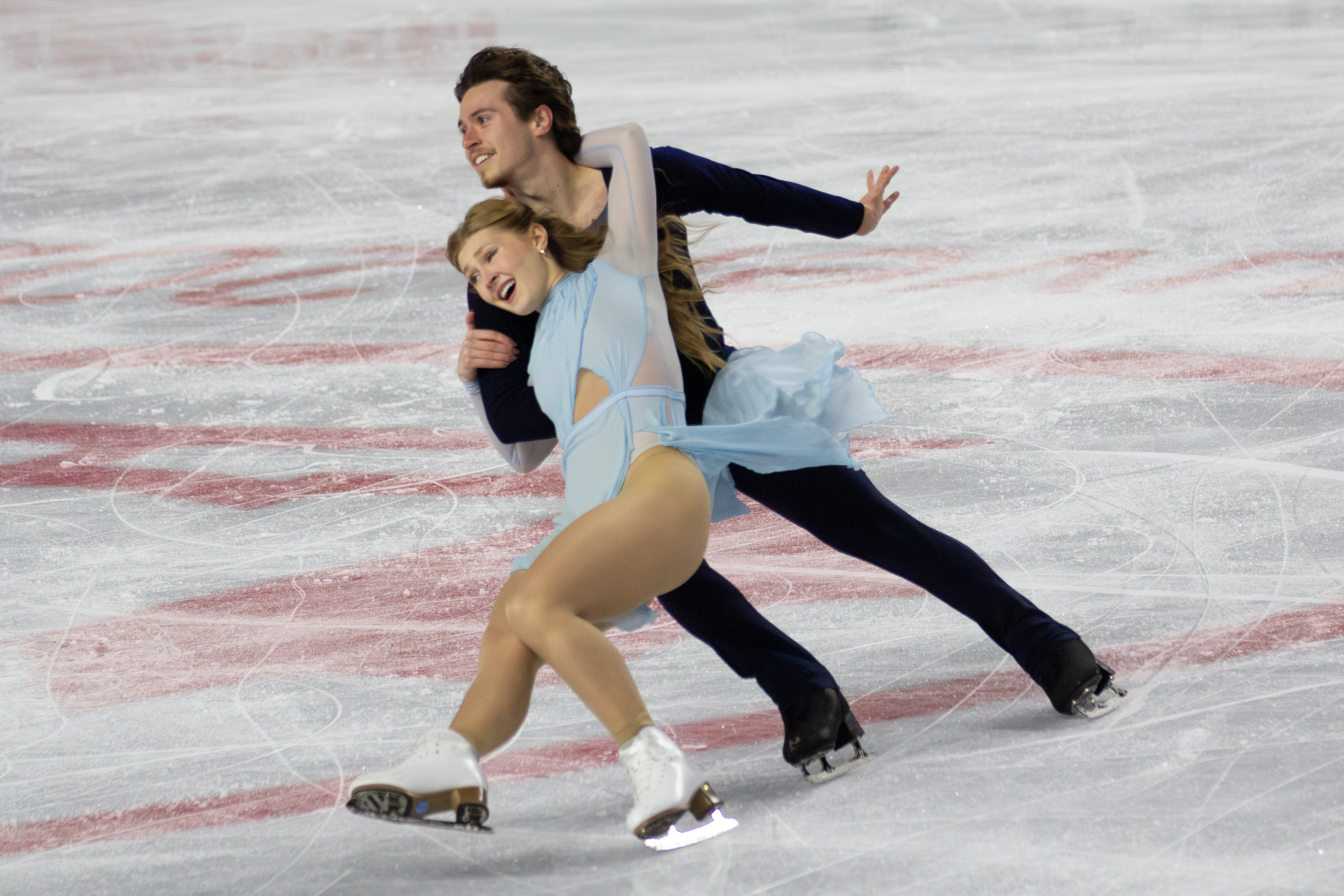
Fabbri/Ayer at 2023 Skate Canada International

Following Ayer's recovery, Fabbri/Ayer started the season at the 2023 CS Nebelhorn Trophy, coming ninth. They were given one Grand Prix assignment, the 2023 Skate Canada International, where they placed seventh.

Fabbri/Ayer won the silver medal at the Skate Canada Challenge, the final qualifier to the 2024 Canadian Championships. In advance of the championships, defending silver medalists Lajoie/Lagha withdrew due to Lajoie entering concussion protocol, whilst reigning champions Fournier Beaudry/Sørensen withdrew after the latter was revealed to be under investigation for sexual assault. The ice dance podium was thus considered more open than in recent years. Fabbri/Ayer won the bronze medal, reaching the senior national podium for the first time.

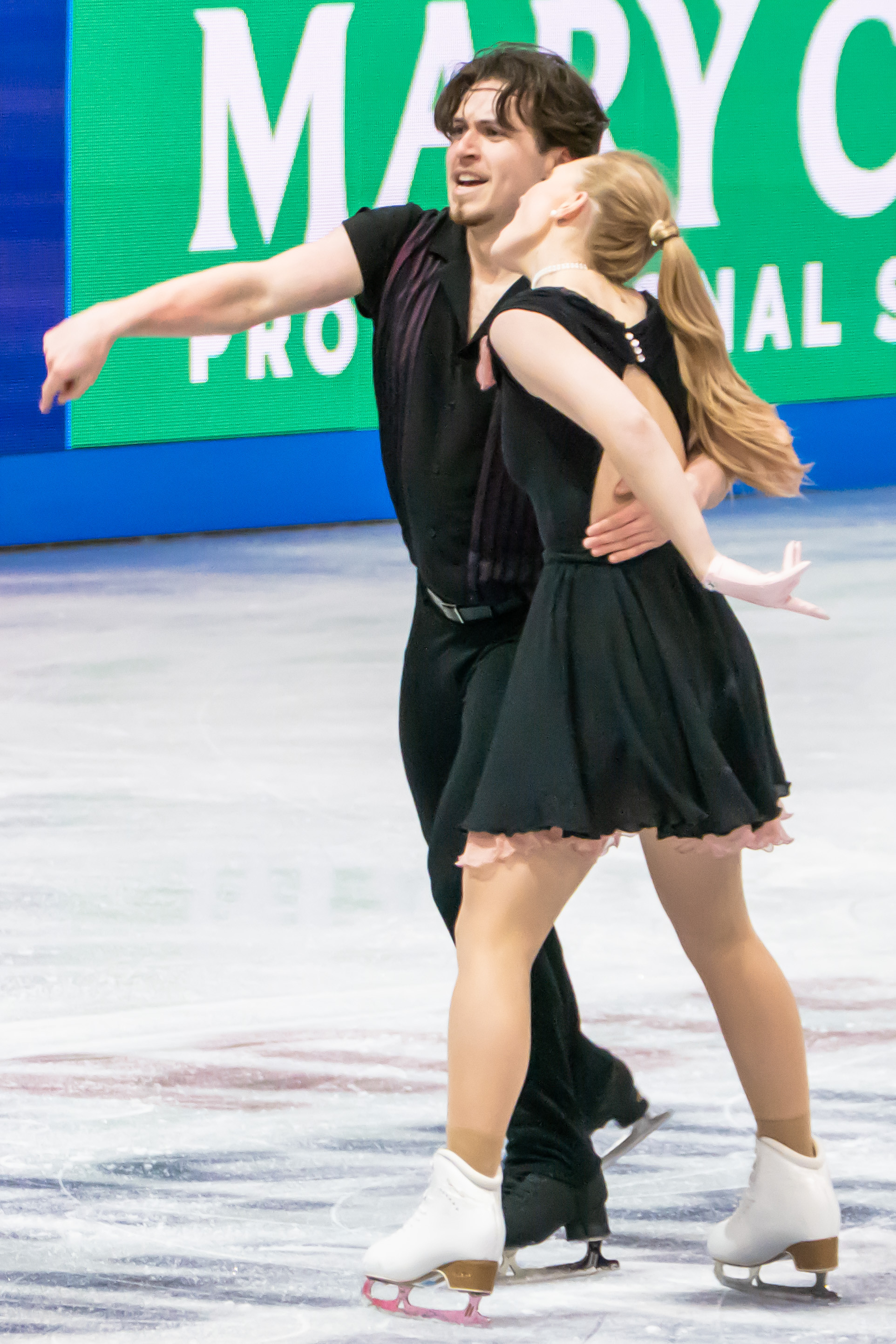
Fabbri/Ayer performing their rhythm dance at the 2025 World Championships

They then ended their season with a bronze medal at the 2024 International Challenge Cup.

==== 2024–2025 season: Four Continents and World Championships debut ====
Fabbri/Ayer started the season with a sixth-place finish at the 2024 Lake Placid Ice Dance International. They won the rhythm dance segment at the 2024 CS Denis Ten Memorial Challenge, before taking the bronze medal overall after a third-place free dance. This was the team's first-ever Challenger series medal. Fabbri said afterward that their "goal coming into the competition is always to focus on the competition, ourselves, and being better than what we were yesterday. When we're gifted with a medal at the end it’s even better, but it wasn't the main focus."

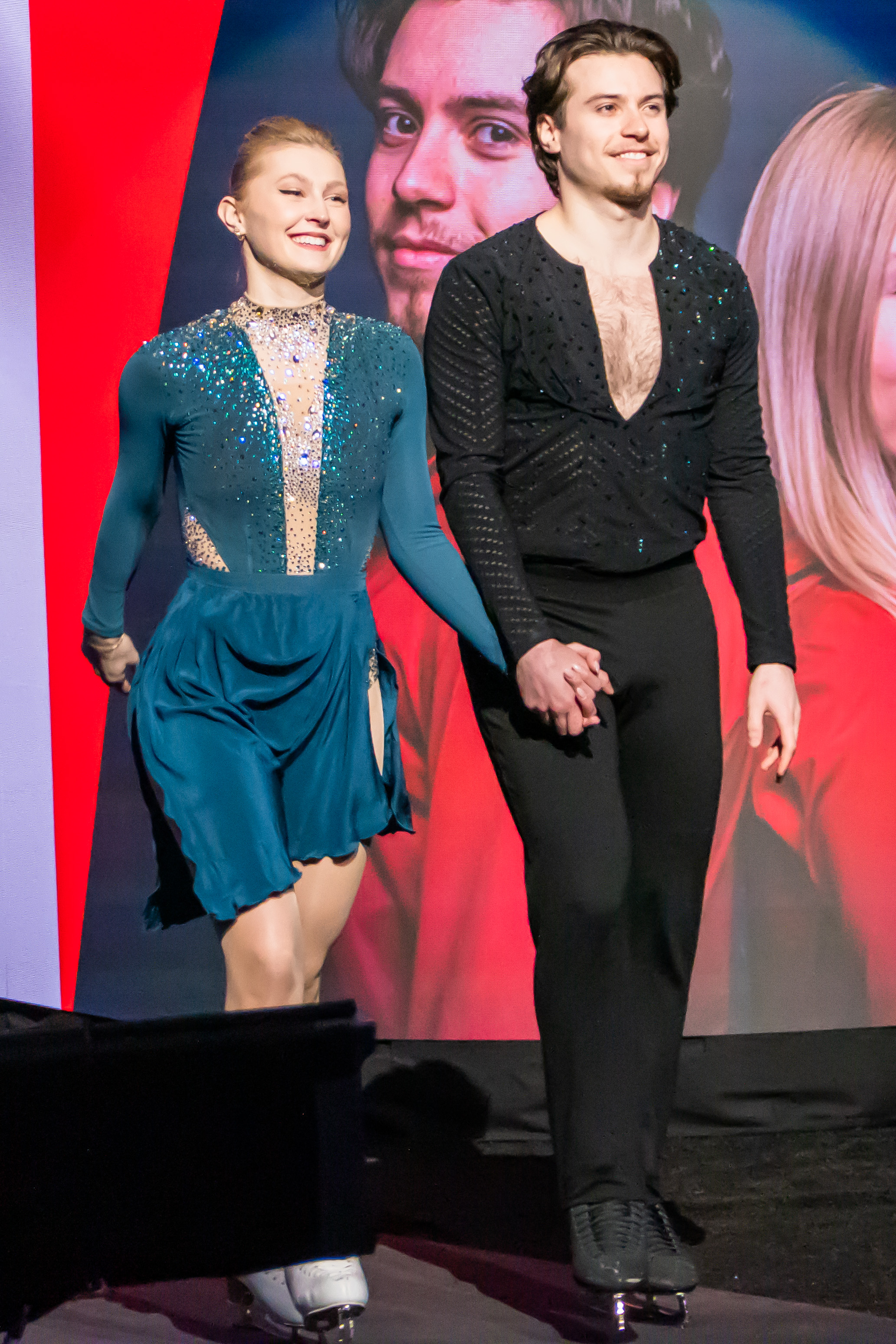
Fabbri/Ayer before the free dance at the 2025 World Championships

Going on to compete on the 2024–25 Grand Prix circuit, Fabbri/Ayer finished fourth in the rhythm dance at 2024 Skate America. In the free dance, Fabbri fell out of her twizzle sequence, as a result of which they finished tenth of ten teams in the segment and dropped to tenth overall. One week later, they competed at 2024 Skate Canada International where they finished eighth. In November, Fabbri/Ayer were given a second Challenger assignment, coming fourth at the 2024 CS Tallinn Trophy with new personal bests in all segments.

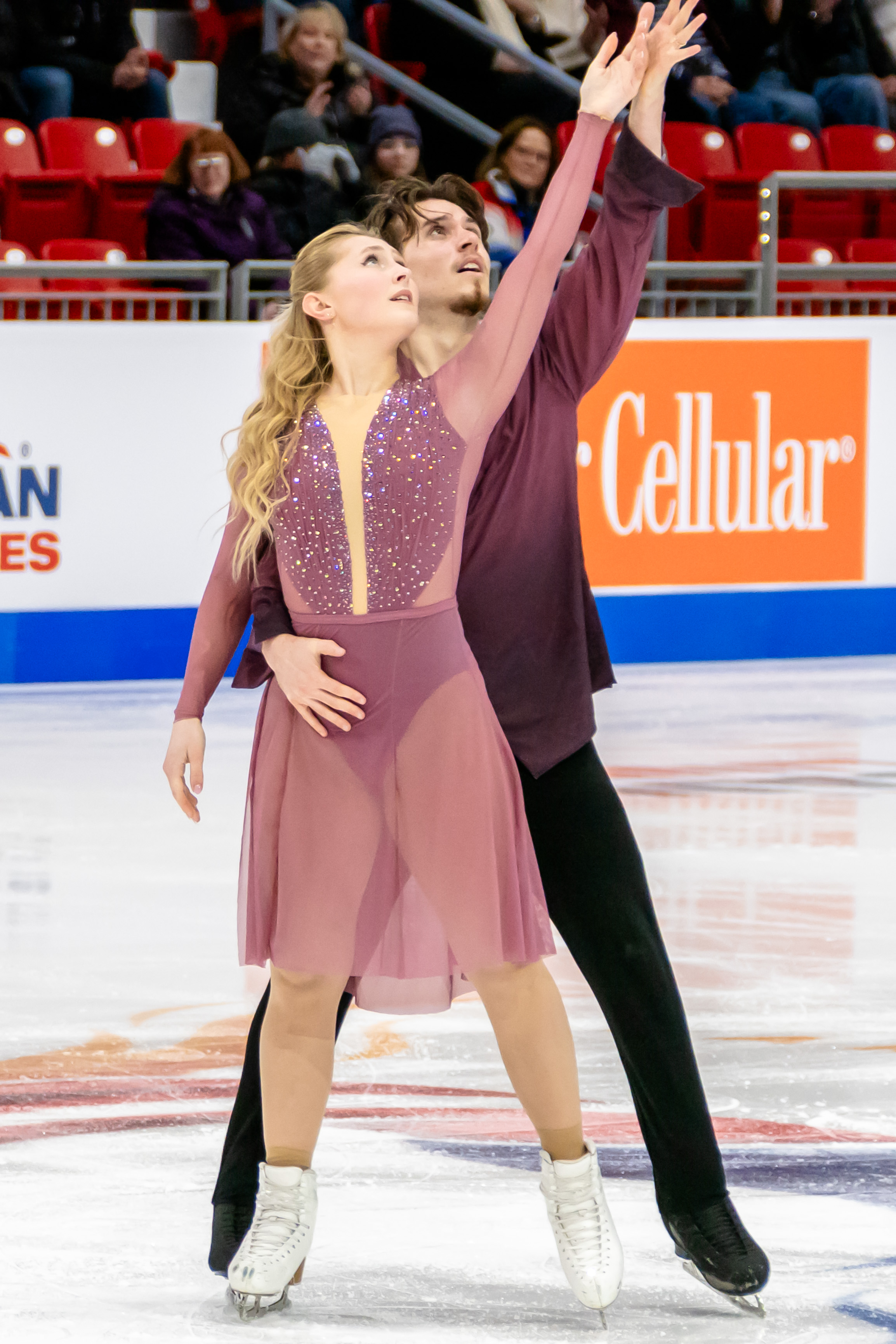
Fabbri/Ayer during their free dance at the 2025 Skate America

Fabbri/Ayer entered 2025 Canadian Championships as prospective contenders for the bronze medal. They were third in the rhythm dance with a score of 78.53, 0.44 points ahead of fellow Ice Academy of Montreal skaters Lauriault/Le Gac. They were third as well in the free dance, with a wider margin over fourth-place, reaching the senior national podium for the second time. Fabbri noted that compared with their first appearance, to medal with "nobody missing in front of us is just amazing."

Going on to compete at the 2025 Four Continents Championships in Seoul, South Korea, Fabbri/Ayer finished in ninth place. They closed the season by making their World Championships debut at the 2025 World Championships in Boston, Massachusetts, United States, where they finished twentieth place overall.

==== 2025–2026 season ====
Fabbri and Ayer opened the season by competing on the 2025–26 Challenger Series, placing fifth at the 2025 CS Kinoshita Group Cup and fourth at the 2025 CS Denis Ten Memorial Challenge. Going on to compete on the 2025–26 Grand Prix series, Fabbri/Ayer finished ninth at the 2025 NHK Trophy and at 2025 Skate America.

In January, Fabbri and Ayer competed at the 2026 Canadian Championships, finishing in fourth. place.

On March 31, 2026, Fabbri and Ayer announced via Instagram that the team had decided to split after nearly a decade of skating together.

=== Partnership with Gauthier ===
==== 2026-27 season ====
In June 2026, it was announced that Ayer had paired with Sandrine Gauthier.

== Programs ==
=== Ice dance with Alicia Fabbri ===
Season	Rhythm dance	Free dance	Exhibition
2025–2026	Boombastic; Oh Carolina by Shaggy; Rock This Party by Bob Sinclar ft. Dollarman, Big Ali, & Makedah choreo. by Marie-France Dubreuil	Leave a Light On by Tom Walker choreo. by Zachary Donohue	Barbie Girl by Aqua; I'm Just Ken by Ryan Gosling; Dance the Night by Dua Lipa
2024–2025	Jailhouse Rock; Suspicious Minds; Blue Suede Shoes by Elvis Presley choreo. by Zachary Donohue	It's a Man's Man's Man's World by James Brown; You Don't Own Me performed by Brenna Whitaker choreo. by Marie-France Dubreuil	Barbie Girl by Aqua; I'm Just Ken by Ryan Gosling; Dance the Night by Dua Lipa
2023–2024	Back in Black; Hells Bells; You Shook Me All Night Long by AC/DC choreo. by Zachary Donohue	Someone You Loved by Lewis Capaldi; You Who Will Fill My Life by Karl Hugo; Someone You Loved by Lewis Capaldi choreo. by Marie-France Dubreuil	Burlesque; Show Me How You Burlesque performed by Christina Aguilera; Welcome to Burlesque performed by Cher choreo. by Romain Haguenauer
2022–2023	Salsa: Cuba 2012 by Latin Formation; Rhumba: Represent, Cuba by Orishas ft. Heather Headley; Salsa: Cuba 2012 by Latin Formation choreo. by Romain Haguenauer	Someone You Loved by Lewis Capaldi; You Who Will Fill My Life by Karl Hugo; Someone You Loved by Lewis Capaldi choreo. by Marie-France Dubreuil	
2021–2022	Reggae: Mi Gente by J Balvin, Willy William, & Beyoncé; Blues: Partition by Beyoncé choreo. by Marie-France Dubreuil, Romain Haguenauer	Self Portrait; The Floating Bed; Alcoba Azul; Solo Tu (from Frida) by Elliot Goldenthal choreo. by Romain Haguenauer	
2020–2021	Quickstep: Show Me How You Burlesque (from Burlesque) performed by Christina Aguilera; Welcome to Burlesque (from Burlesque) performed by Cher choreo. by Romain Haguenauer	Self Portrait; The Floating Bed; Alcoba Azul; Solo Tu (from Frida) by Elliot Goldenthal choreo. by Romain Haguenauer	
2019–2020	Big Spender; If My Friends Could See Me Now from Sweet Charity choreo. by Romain Haguenauer	The Way I Do by Bishop Briggs; Never Tear Us Apart by INXS performed by Bishop Briggs choreo. by Romain Haguenauer	
2018–2019	Tango: A Evaristo Carriego by Eduardo Rovira; Tango: Obertuna performed by Forever Tango choreo. by Mylène Girard	Quand on n'a que l'amour by Jacques Brel; Composition by Karl Hugo; Quand on n'a que l'amour by Jacques Brel performed by Pierre Lapointe choreo. by Mylène Girard	

== Competitive highlights ==
- GP – Event of the ISU Grand Prix Series
- JGP – Event of the ISU Junior Grand Prix Series
- CS – Event of the ISU Challenger Series
- TBD – Assigned
- WD – Withdrew from competition

=== Ice dance with Alicia Fabbri ===
Competition placements at senior level
Season	2019–20	2020–21	2021–22	2022–23	2023–24	2024–25	2025–26
World Championships						20th	
Four Continents Championships						9th	4th
Canadian Championships	6th		7th		3rd	3rd	4th
GP NHK Trophy							9th
GP Skate America						10th	9th
GP Skate Canada					7th	8th	
GP Wilson Trophy				8th			
CS Budapest Trophy				4th			
CS Cup of Austria			5th				
CS Denis Ten Memorial						3rd	4th
CS Kinoshita Group Cup							5th
CS Lombardia Trophy			12th				
CS Nebelhorn Trophy					9th		
CS Tallinn Trophy						4th	
CS Warsaw Cup	6th						
Challenge Cup					3rd		
Lake Placid Ice Dance						6th	
Skate Canada Challenge	2nd	5th	1st		2nd		

Competition placements at junior level
Season	2018–19
World Junior Championships	9th
Canadian Championships	2nd
JGP Slovakia	4th
JGP Slovenia	7th
Bavarian Open	2nd
Skate Canada Challenge	1st

== Detailed results ==
=== Ice dance with Alicia Fabbri ===
ISU personal best scores in the +5/-5 GOE System
Segment	Type	Score	Event
Total	TSS	185.05	2024 CS Tallinn Trophy
Short program	TSS	75.05	2024 CS Tallinn Trophy
Short program	TES	42.73	2024 CS Tallinn Trophy
Short program	PCS	32.32	2024 CS Tallinn Trophy
Free skating	TSS	110.29	2026 Four Continents Championships
Free skating	TES	63.31	2026 Four Continents Championships
Free skating	PCS	49.36	2024 CS Denis Ten Memorial Challenge

==== Senior level ====
Results in the 2019–20 season
Date	Event	RD		FD		Total	
Date	Event	P	Score	P	Score	P	Score
Nov 14–17, 2019	(Poland) 2019 CS Warsaw Cup	6	62.14	6	93.63	6	155.77
Jan 13–19, 2020	(Canada) 2020 Canadian Championships	4	68.26	6	97.15	6	165.41

Results in the 2020–21 season
Date	Event	RD		FD		Total	
Date	Event	P	Score	P	Score	P	Score
Jan 8–17, 2021	2021 Skate Canada Challenge	4	75.00	5	109.29	5	184.29

Results in the 2021–22 season
Date	Event	RD		FD		Total	
Date	Event	P	Score	P	Score	P	Score
Sep 10–12, 2021	(Italy) 2021 CS Lombardia Trophy	9	64.77	14	87.72	12	152.49
Nov 11–14, 2021	2021 CS Cup of Austria	6	68.24	5	103.39	5	171.63
Jan 6–12, 2022	(Canada) 2022 Canadian Championships	8	66.43	6	104.72	7	171.15

Results in the 2022–23 season
Date	Event	RD		FD		Total	
Date	Event	P	Score	P	Score	P	Score
Oct 13–16, 2022	(Hungary) 2022 CS Budapest Trophy	4	70.48	5	98.38	4	168.86
Nov 11–13, 2022	(United Kingdom) 2022 MK John Wilson Trophy	8	67.45	9	98.33	8	165.78

Results in the 2023–24 season
Date	Event	RD		FD		Total	
Date	Event	P	Score	P	Score	P	Score
Sep 20–23, 2023	(Germany) 2023 CS Nebelhorn Trophy	7	63.84	9	103.30	9	167.14
Oct 27–29, 2023	2023 Skate Canada International	7	68.31	8	105.03	7	173.34
Nov 30 – Dec 3, 2023	2023 Skate Canada Challenge	2	70.99	1	111.65	2	182.64
Jan 8–14, 2024	(Canada) 2024 Canadian Championships	3	77.75	3	117.86	3	195.61
Feb 22–25, 2024	(Netherlands) 2024 Challenge Cup	3	70.98	3	104.90	3	175.88

Results in the 2024–25 season
Date	Event	RD		FD		Total	
Date	Event	P	Score	P	Score	P	Score
Jul 28–31, 2024	(United States) 2024 Lake Placid Ice Dance International	6	67.32	5	108.88	6	176.20
Oct 3–6, 2024	(Kazakhstan) 2024 CS Denis Ten Memorial Challenge	1	73.66	3	109.32	3	182.98
Oct 18–20, 2024	(United States) 2024 Skate America	4	71.75	10	94.21	10	165.96
Oct 25–27, 2025	2024 Skate Canada International	9	70.10	8	104.35	8	174.45
Nov 12–17, 2024	(Estonia) 2024 CS Tallinn Trophy	4	75.05	4	110.00	4	185.05
Jan 14–19, 2025	(Canada) 2025 Canadian Championships	3	78.53	3	117.35	3	195.88
Feb 19–23, 2025	(South Korea) 2025 Four Continents Championships	10	60.06	8	106.43	9	166.49
Mar 24–30, 2025	(United States) 2025 World Championships	19	68.95	20	101.93	20	170.88

Results in the 2025–26 season
Date	Event	RD		FD		Total	
Date	Event	P	Score	P	Score	P	Score
Sep 5–7, 2025	(Japan) 2025 CS Kinoshita Group Cup	5	66.69	5	102.69	5	169.38
Oct 1–4, 2025	(Kazakhstan) 2025 CS Denis Ten Memorial Challenge	4	67.84	3	105.50	4	173.34
Nov 7–9, 2025	(Japan) 2025 NHK Trophy	9	68.53	9	106.18	9	174.71
Nov 14–16, 2025	(United States) 2025 Skate America	9	65.37	9	100.31	9	165.68
Jan 5–11, 2026	(Canada) 2026 Canadian Championships	4	78.05	4	118.07	4	196.12
Jan 21-25, 2026	(China) 2026 Four Continents Championships	4	73.20	5	110.29	4	183.49

==== Junior level ====
2018–2019 season
Date	Event	RD	FD	Total
March 4–10, 2019	2019 World Junior Championships	13; 55.58	8; 87.46	9; 143.04
February 5–10, 2019	2019 Bavarian Open	2; 58.54	3; 86.10	2; 144.64
January 14–20, 2019	2019 Canadian Junior Championships	2; 62.20	3; 96.37	2; 158.57
October 3–6, 2018	2018 JGP Slovenia	6; 53.20	8; 78.21	7; 131.41
August 22–25, 2018	2018 JGP Slovakia	4; 58.53	6; 77.13	4; 135.66
