= 2025 Skate America =

International figure skating competition

- Type: Grand Prix
- Date: November 14 – 16
- Season: 2025–26
- Location: Lake Placid, New York, United States
- Host: U.S. Figure Skating
- Venue: Herb Brooks Arena

Champions
- Men's singles: (France) Kévin Aymoz
- Women's singles: (United States) Alysa Liu
- Pairs: (Japan) Riku Miura and Ryuichi Kihara
- Ice dance: (United States) Madison Chock and Evan Bates
- Previous: 2024 Skate America
- Next: 2026 Skate America
- Previous Grand Prix: 2025 NHK Trophy
- Next Grand Prix: 2025 Finlandia Trophy

The 2025 Skate America took place at the Herb Brooks Arena in Lake Placid, New York.

The 2025 Skate America is a figure skating competition sanctioned by the International Skating Union (ISU). Organized and hosted by U.S. Figure Skating, it was the fifth event of the 2025–26 Grand Prix of Figure Skating: a senior-level international invitational competition series. It was held from November 14 to 16 at the Herb Brooks Arena in Lake Placid, New York, in the United States. Medals were awarded in men's singles, women's singles, pair skating, and ice dance. Skaters earned points based on their results, and the top skaters or teams in each discipline at the end of the season were then invited to compete at the 2025 Grand Prix Final in Nagoya, Japan. Kévin Aymoz of France won the men's event, Alysa Liu of the United States won the women's event, Riku Miura and Ryuichi Kihara of Japan won the pairs event, and Madison Chock and Evan Bates of the United States won the ice dance event.

== Background ==
The ISU Grand Prix of Figure Skating is a series of seven events sanctioned by the International Skating Union (ISU) and held during the autumn: six qualifying events and the Grand Prix of Figure Skating Final. This allows skaters to perfect their programs earlier in the season, as well as compete against the skaters whom they would later encounter at the World Championships. Skaters earn points based on their results in their respective competitions and the top skaters or teams in each discipline are invited to compete at the Grand Prix Final. The first iteration of Skate America – then called the Norton Skate – was held in 1979 in Lake Placid, New York, and was the test event for the 1980 Winter Olympics. When the ISU launched the Grand Prix series in 1995, Skate America was one of the five qualifying events. It has been a Grand Prix event every year since.

The 2025 Skate America was the fifth event of the 2025–26 Grand Prix of Figure Skating series, and was held from November 14 to 16 at the Herb Brooks Arena in Lake Placid, New York, in the United States.

== Changes to preliminary assignments ==
The International Skating Union published the initial list of entrants on June 6, 2025.

Discipline	Withdrew		Added		Notes	Ref.
Discipline	Date	Skater(s)	Date	Skater(s)	Notes	Ref.
Women	—N/a		July 14	(United States); Starr Andrews	Host picks	
Women	—N/a		July 14	(United States); Josephine Lee	Host picks	
Pairs	September 2	(Uzbekistan); Ekaterina Geynish; Dmitrii Chigirev	September 15	(Italy); Lucrezia Beccari; Matteo Guarise	—N/a	
Men	—N/a		September 15	(United States); Liam Kapeikis	Host picks	
Pairs	—N/a		September 15	(United States); Audrey Shin; Balázs Nagy	Host picks	
Ice dance	—N/a		September 15	(United States); Oona Brown; Gage Brown	Host picks	
Ice dance	October 28	(Italy); Noemi Maria Tali; Noah Lafornara	November 3	(Canada); Alicia Fabbri; Paul Ayer	Injury (Lafornara)	
Pairs	November 7	(Italy); Lucrezia Beccari; Matteo Guarise	November 10	(Armenia); Karina Akopova; Nikita Rakhmanin	—N/a	
Pairs	November 9	(United States); Audrey Shin; Balázs Nagy	November 9	(United States); Emily Chan; Spencer Akira Howe	—N/a	

== Required performance elements ==
=== Single skating ===
Men competing in single skating performed their short programs on November 14, while women performed theirs on November 15. Lasting 2 minutes 40 seconds (+/− 10 seconds), the short program had to include the following elements:

For men: one double or triple Axel; one triple or quadruple jump; one jump combination consisting of a double jump and a triple jump, two triple jumps, or a quadruple jump and a double jump or triple jump; one flying spin; one camel spin or sit spin with a change of foot; one spin combination with a change of foot; and a step sequence using the full ice surface.

For women: one double or triple Axel; one triple jump; one jump combination consisting of a double jump and a triple jump, or two triple jumps; one flying spin; one layback spin, sideways leaning spin, camel spin, or sit spin without a change of foot; one spin combination with a change of foot; and one step sequence using the full ice surface.

Men performed their free skates on November 15, while women performed theirs on November 16. Lasting 4 minutes (+/− 10 seconds), the free skate had to include the following: seven jump elements, of which one had to be an Axel-type jump; three spins, of which one had to be a spin combination, one a flying spin, and one a spin with only one position; a step sequence; and a choreographic sequence.

=== Pairs ===
Couples competing in pair skating performed their short programs on November 14. Lasting 2 minutes 40 seconds (+/− 10 seconds), the short program had to include the following elements: one pair lift, one double or triple twist lift, one double or triple throw jump, one double or triple solo jump, one solo spin combination with a change of foot, one death spiral, and a step sequence using the full ice surface.

Couples performed their free skates on November 15. Lasting 4 minutes (+/− 10 seconds), the free skate had to include the following: three pair lifts, of which one had to be a twist lift; two different throw jumps; one solo jump; one jump combination or sequence; one pair spin combination; one death spiral; and a choreographic sequence.

=== Ice dance ===
Couples competing in ice dance performed their rhythm dances on November 15. Lasting 2 minutes 50 seconds (+/− 10 seconds), the theme of the rhythm dance this season was "music, dance styles, and feeling of the 1990s". Examples of applicable dance styles and music included pop, Latin, house, techno, hip-hop, and grunge. The rhythm dance had to include the following elements: one pattern dance step sequence, one choreographic rhythm sequence, one dance lift, one set of sequential twizzles, and one step sequence.

Couples then performed their free dances on November 16. Lasting 4 minutes (+/− 10 seconds), the free dance had to include the following: three dance lifts or one short lift and one combination lift; one dance spin; one set of synchronized twizzles; one step sequence in hold; one step sequence while on one skate and not in hold, and three choreographic elements.

== Judging ==
Skaters were judged according to the required technical elements of their program (such as jumps and spins), as well as the overall presentation of their program, based on three program components (skating skills, presentation, and composition). Each technical element in a figure skating performance was assigned a predetermined base point value and scored by a panel of nine judges on a scale from −5 to +5 based on the quality of its execution. Each Grade of Execution (GOE) from –5 to +5 was assigned a value as indicated on the Scale of Values. For example, a triple Axel was worth a base value of 8.00 points, and a GOE of +3 was worth 2.40 points, so a triple Axel with a GOE of +3 earned 10.40 points. The judging panel's GOE for each element was determined by calculating the trimmed mean (the average after discarding the highest and lowest scores). The panel's scores for all elements were added together to generate a Total Elements Score. At the same time, the judges evaluated each performance based on the five aforementioned program components and assigned each a score from 0.25 to 10 in 0.25-point increments. The judging panel's final score for each program component was also determined by calculating the trimmed mean. Those scores were then multiplied by the factor shown on the chart below; the results were added together to generate a total Program Component Score.

Program component factoring
Discipline	Short program or Rhythm dance	Free skate or Free dance
Men	1.67	3.33
Women	1.33	2.67
Pairs	1.33	2.67
Ice dance	1.33	2.00

Deductions were applied for certain violations, such as time infractions or falls. The Total Elements Score and Program Component Score were then added together, minus any deductions, to generate a final performance score for each skater or team.

== Medal summary ==
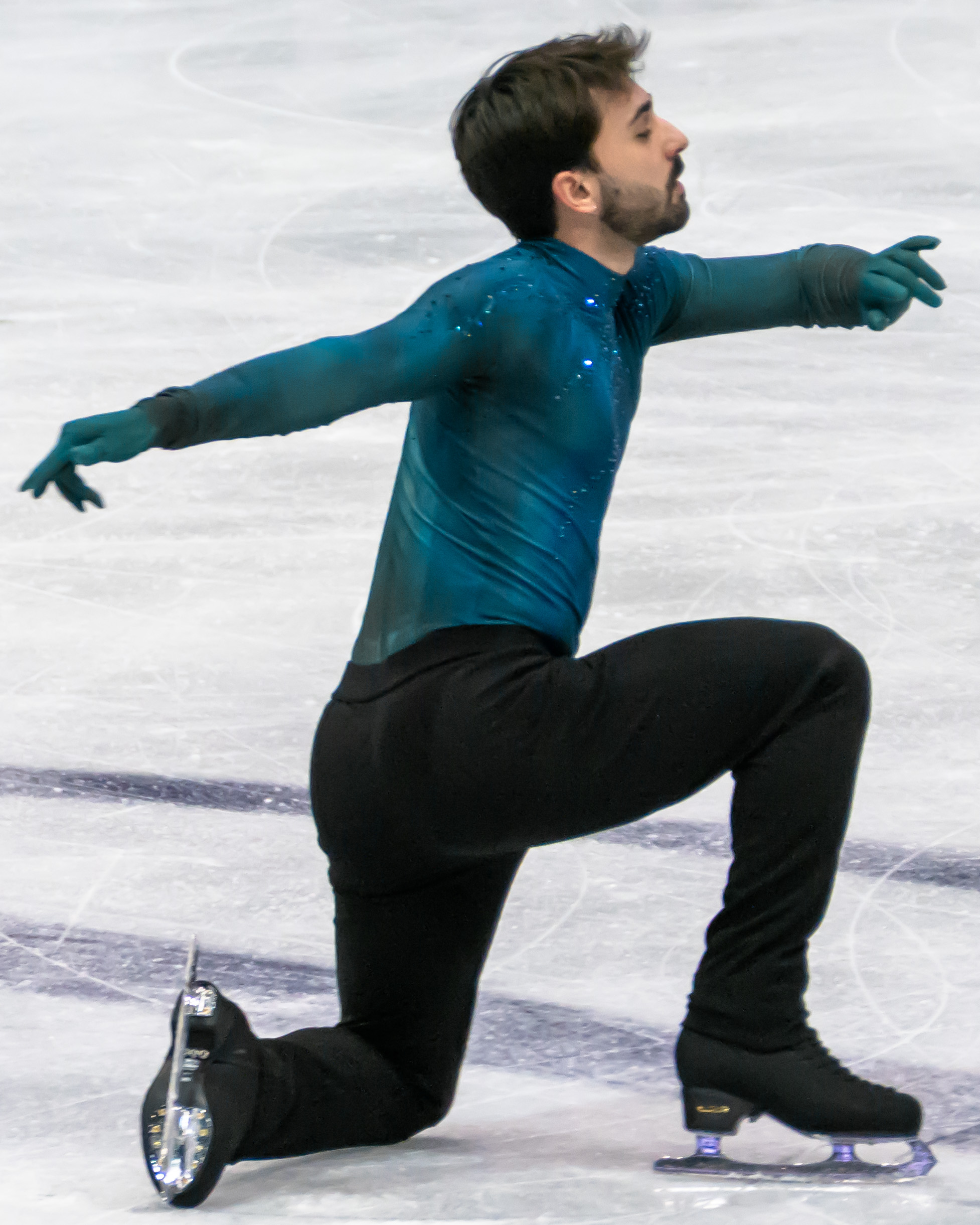
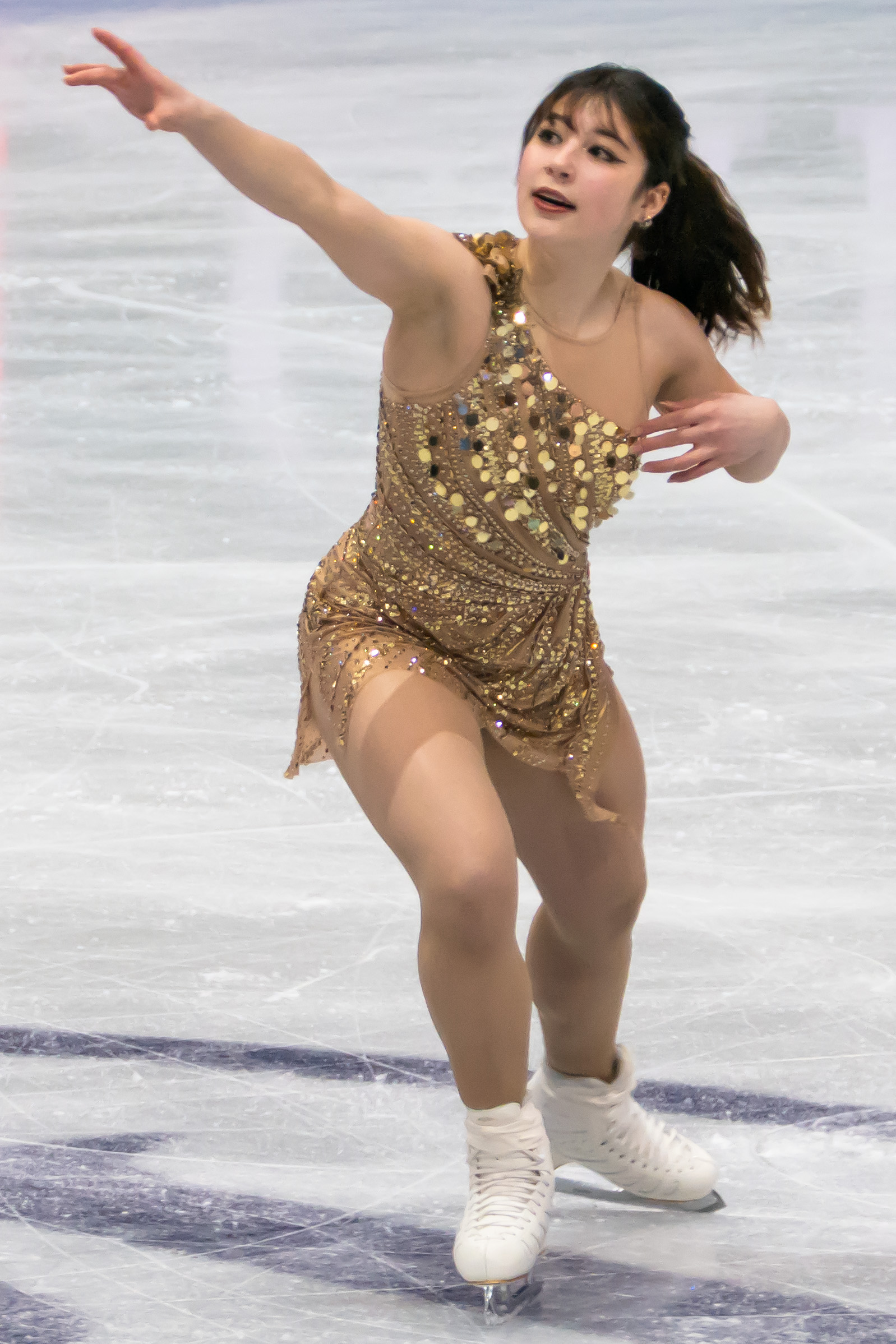
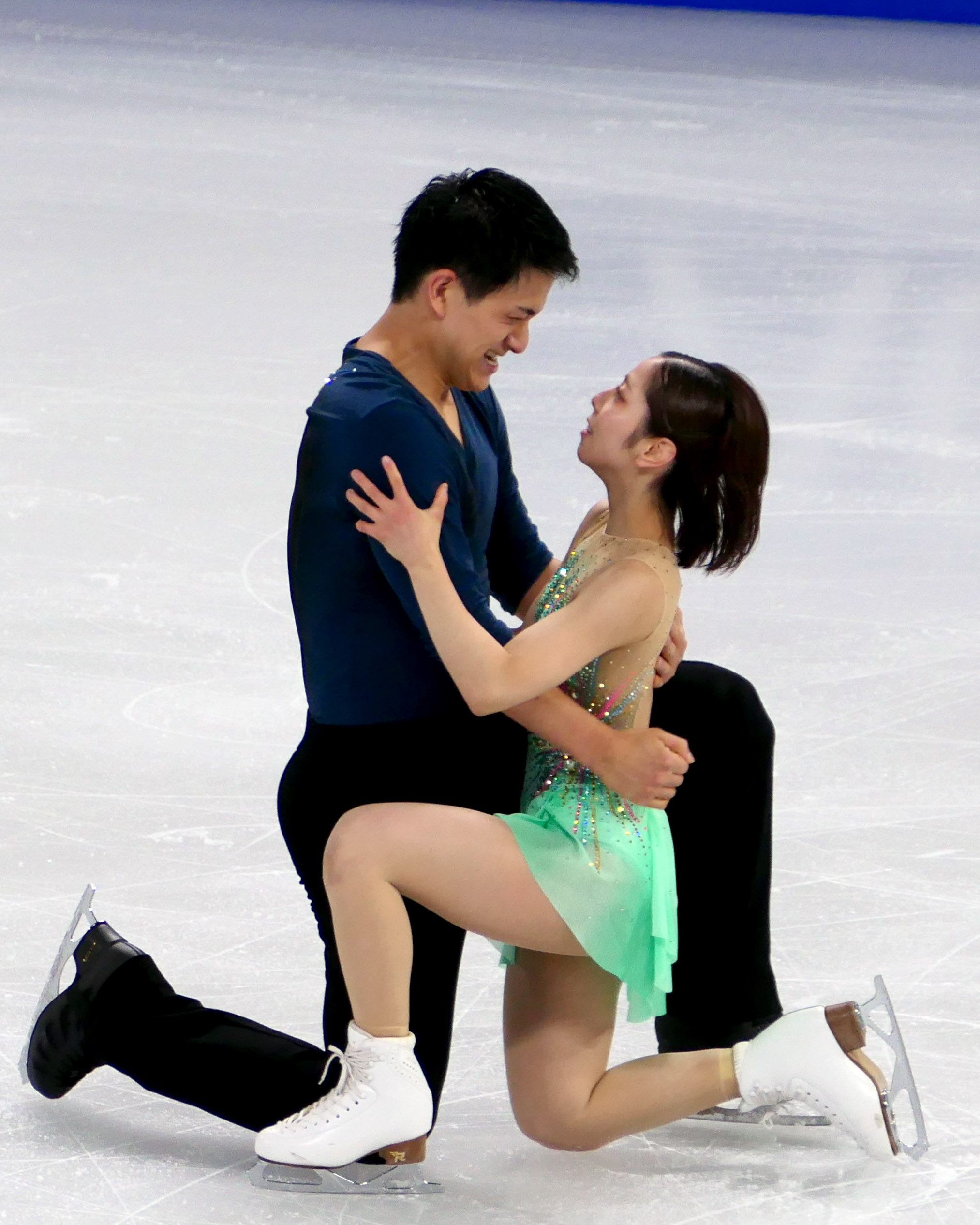
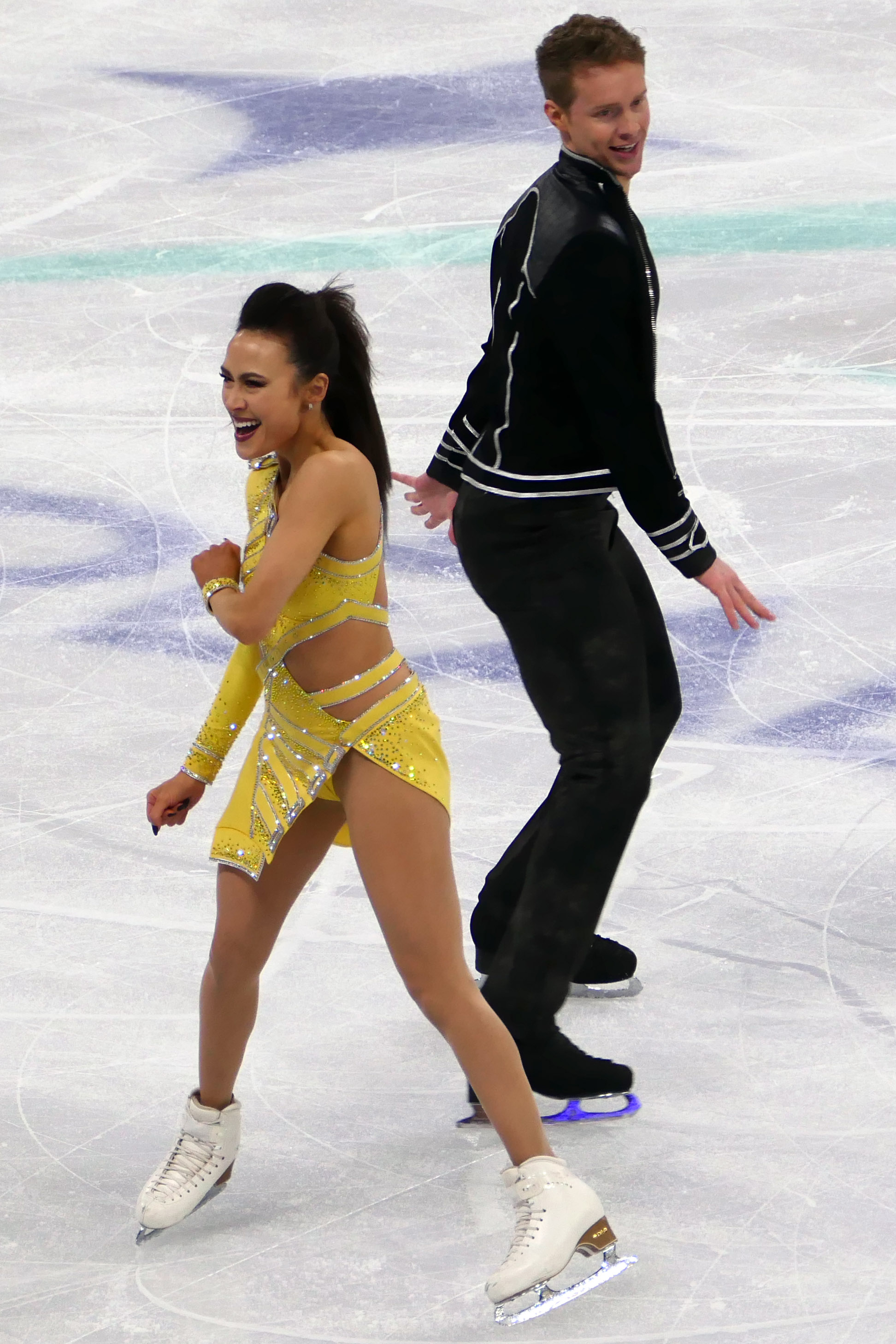
The 2025 Skate America champions: Kévin Aymoz of France (men's singles); Alysa Liu of the United States (women's singles); Riku Miura and Ryuichi Kihara of Japan (pair skating); and Madison Chock and Evan Bates of the United States (ice dance)

Medalists
Discipline	Gold	Silver	Bronze
Men	(France) Kévin Aymoz	(Kazakhstan) Mikhail Shaidorov	(Japan) Kazuki Tomono
Women	(United States) Alysa Liu	(Japan) Rinka Watanabe	(Georgia (country)) Anastasiia Gubanova
Pairs	(Japan); Riku Miura; Ryuichi Kihara	(Georgia (country)); Anastasiia Metelkina; Luka Berulava	(Canada); Kelly Ann Laurin; Loucas Éthier
Ice dance	(United States); Madison Chock; Evan Bates	(Canada); Marjorie Lajoie; Zachary Lagha	(France); Evgeniia Lopareva; Geoffrey Brissaud

== Results ==
=== Men's singles ===
Kévin Aymoz of France won the gold medal – the first Grand Prix championship of his career – in an emotional end to the men's event. Aymoz had been nursing an injury all weekend, but completed his free skate to Boléro that featured two quadruple jumps, five triple jumps, and the highest quality spins and step sequence. He began crying when the final scores were announced. Aymoz had earlier finished in tenth place at the 2025 Skate Canada International after suffering his injury. "I feel like I went to hell and I'm just dreaming right now," Aymoz stated. Mikhail Shaidorov of Kazakhstan finished in second place. Kazuki Tomono of Japan, who had been in the lead after the short program, finished in third place after repeatedly falling during his free skate.

Jason Brown of the United States, who had made his Grand Prix debut twelve years earlier at the 2013 Skate America, resurrected his Riverdance performance from that season for his short program. "To be back twelve years later and getting to perform this program, I feel so proud and honored," Brown stated. "It speaks to that longevity and my love of the sport, being able to share this moment with the crowd." Brown's Riverdance performance went viral after the 2014 Winter Olympics, so he chose to rework it for this season as his way of saying 'thank you' to the fans while, at the same time, vying for a spot on the U.S. team at the 2026 Winter Olympics. Brown ultimately finished in fourth place after the free skate.

Men's results
Rank	Skater	Nation	Total points	SP		FS	
1st place, gold medalist(s)	Kévin Aymoz	France	253.53	2	93.56	2	159.97
2nd place, silver medalist(s)	Mikhail Shaidorov	Kazakhstan	251.09	3	89.67	1	161.42
3rd place, bronze medalist(s)	Kazuki Tomono	Japan	245.57	1	95.77	8	149.80
4	Jason Brown	United States	239.59	5	82.69	3	156.90
5	Daniel Grassl	Italy	236.44	4	83.68	6	152.76
6	Vladimir Litvintsev	Azerbaijan	231.84	7	75.87	4	155.97
7	Nikolaj Memola	Italy	231.02	8	75.61	5	155.41
8	Tatsuya Tsuboi	Japan	228.03	6	77.68	7	150.35
9	Liam Kapeikis	United States	214.29	9	74.28	9	140.01
10	Luc Economides	France	201.36	10	71.98	10	129.38
11	Dai Daiwei	China	190.90	11	64.98	12	125.92
12	Corey Circelli	Italy	190.55	12	61.99	11	128.56

=== Women's singles ===
Alysa Liu of the United States finished second in the short program with an emotional performance to "Promise" by Laufey. Her performance received a standing ovation from the audience, and placed her less than one point behind Rinka Watanabe of Japan. Liu received a season-best score in the free skate for her program to "MacArthur Park", guaranteeing herself a spot at the Grand Prix Final. Watanabe successfully performed a triple Axel-triple toe loop jump combination, but faltered on a second triple Axel and struggled with other jumps, finishing three points behind Liu. "I am a bit frustrated with my results," Watanabe said. Anastasiia Gubanova of Georgia finished in third place, only four-tenths of a point ahead of Lara Naki Gutmann of Italy.

Women's results
Rank	Skater	Nation	Total points	SP		FS	
1st place, gold medalist(s)	Alysa Liu	United States	214.27	2	73.73	1	140.54
2nd place, silver medalist(s)	Rinka Watanabe	Japan	210.96	1	74.35	3	136.61
3rd place, bronze medalist(s)	Anastasiia Gubanova	Georgia	204.69	4	68.07	2	136.62
4	Lara Naki Gutmann	Italy	204.29	3	69.69	4	134.60
5	Starr Andrews	United States	195.28	6	64.38	5	130.90
6	Kim Chae-yeon	South Korea	188.22	5	67.28	6	120.94
7	Léa Serna	France	175.05	9	59.25	7	115.80
8	Lee Hae-in	South Korea	172.99	7	64.06	9	108.93
9	Hana Yoshida	Japan	170.92	10	57.22	8	113.70
10	Ekaterina Kurakova	Poland	163.77	11	56.05	10	107.72
11	Wakaba Higuchi	Japan	159.40	8	60.12	11	99.28
12	Josephine Lee	United States	147.28	12	54.24	12	93.04

=== Pairs ===
Riku Miura and Ryuichi Kihara of Japan rallied back from a second-place finish after the short program to win the pairs event, guaranteeing their spot at the Grand Prix of Final. Anastasiia Metelkina and Luka Berulava of Georgia, who had been in the lead after the short program, made a series of errors in their free skate – including a fall on their side-by-side triple Salchow and completely missing a lift – and finished in second place. "We are not sure what happened on the lift," Berulava stated afterward. "The lift is the job of the man... I should lift up my partner and I didn't do that." Kelly Ann Laurin and Loucas Éthier of Canada finished in third place.

Pairs results
Rank	Team	Nation	Total points	SP		FS	
1st place, gold medalist(s)	Riku Miura; Ryuichi Kihara	Japan	215.99	2	74.42	1	141.57
2nd place, silver medalist(s)	Anastasiia Metelkina; Luka Berulava	Georgia	195.73	1	78.83	4	116.90
3rd place, bronze medalist(s)	Kelly Ann Laurin; Loucas Éthier	Canada	182.87	6	61.29	2	121.58
4	Emily Chan; Spencer Akira Howe	United States	180.02	5	61.51	3	118.51
5	Annika Hocke; Robert Kunkel	Germany	176.56	3	68.26	5	108.30
6	Karina Akopova; Nikita Rakhmanin	Armenia	170.98	4	64.74	7	106.24
7	Valentina Plazas; Maximiliano Fernandez	United States	163.26	7	56.85	6	106.41
8	Olivia Flores; Luke Wang	United States	161.44	8	55.83	8	105.61

=== Ice dance ===
Madison Chock and Evan Bates of the United States won their fifth Skate America title, tying the record held by Tanith Belbin and Benjamin Agosto, also of the United States. Their victory was by a fifteen-point margin over second-place finishers Marjorie Lajoie and Zachary Lagha of Canada, and also secured their spot at the Grand Prix of Final. "Every opportunity that we have to compete lends us new insights and new ways to look at things," Chock said afterward. "We’re going to take away the good... we have coming away from this experience." Evgeniia Lopareva and Geoffrey Brissaud of France finished in third place.

Ice dance results
Rank	Skater	Nation	Total points	RD		FD	
1st place, gold medalist(s)	Madison Chock; Evan Bates	United States	212.58	1	84.77	1	127.81
2nd place, silver medalist(s)	Marjorie Lajoie; Zachary Lagha	Canada	197.16	2	77.42	2	119.74
3rd place, bronze medalist(s)	Evgeniia Lopareva; Geoffrey Brissaud	France	192.61	3	76.72	3	115.89
4	Loïcia Demougeot; Théo le Mercier	France	186.69	4	73.47	5	113.22
5	Christina Carreira; Anthony Ponomarenko	United States	186.03	5	72.74	4	113.29
6	Oona Brown; Gage Brown	United States	182.11	7	70.25	6	111.86
7	Kateřina Mrázková; Daniel Mrázek	Czech Republic	176.04	6	72.73	8	103.31
8	Phebe Bekker; James Hernandez	Great Britain	173.16	8	66.81	7	106.35
9	Alicia Fabbri; Paul Ayer	Canada	165.68	9	65.37	9	100.31
10	Célina Fradji; Jean-Hans Fourneaux	France	144.54	10	56.21	10	88.33

== Works cited ==
- "Special Regulations & Technical Rules – Single & Pair Skating and Ice Dance 2024" (PDF). International Skating Union. Archived (PDF) from the original on June 3, 2025.
