= 2025 CS Denis Ten Memorial Challenge =

Figure skating competition

- Type: ISU Challenger Series
- Date: 1 – 4 October 2025
- Season: 2025–26
- Location: Almaty, Kazakhstan
- Host: Denis Ten Foundation & Kazakhstan Skating Union
- Venue: Halyk Arena

Champions
- Men's singles: (Kazakhstan) Mikhail Shaidorov
- Women's singles: (South Korea) Lee Hae-in
- Ice dance: (Georgia (country)) Diana Davis and Gleb Smolkin
- Previous: 2024 CS Denis Ten Memorial Challenge
- Next: 2026 CS Denis Ten Memorial Challenge
- Previous CS: 2025 CS Nepela Memorial
- Next CS: 2025 CS Trialeti Trophy

The 2025 Denis Ten Memorial Challenge took place at the Halyk Arena in Almaty, Kazakhstan.

The 2025 Denis Ten Memorial Challenge was a figure skating competition sanctioned by the International Skating Union (ISU), organized and hosted by the Denis Ten Foundation and the Kazakhstan Skating Union, and the seventh event of the 2025–26 ISU Challenger Series. It was held at the Halyk Arena in Almaty, Kazakhstan, from 1 to 4 October 2025. Medals were awarded in men's singles, women's singles, and ice dance, and skaters earned ISU World Standing points based on their results. Mikhail Shaidorov of Kazakhstan won the men's event, Lee Hae-in of South Korea won the women's event, and Diana Davis and Gleb Smolkin of Georgia won the ice dance event.

== Background ==
The inaugural edition of the Denis Ten Memorial Challenge was held in 2019 in Almaty. The competition is named in honor of Denis Ten, a former figure skater who competed internationally for Kazakhstan; he was the 2014 Winter Olympic bronze medalist, a two-time World Championship medalist, and the 2015 Four Continents champion. Ten was murdered on 19 July 2018 in Almaty by carjackers. The 2025 Denis Ten Memorial Challenge took place from 1 to 4 October at the Halyk Arena in Almaty.

The ISU Challenger Series was introduced in 2014. It is a series of international figure skating competitions sanctioned by the International Skating Union (ISU) and organized by ISU member nations. The objective was to ensure consistent organization and structure within a series of international competitions linked together, providing opportunities for senior-level skaters to compete at the international level and also earn ISU World Standing points. The 2025–26 Challenger Series consisted of eleven events, of which the Denis Ten Memorial Challenge was the seventh.

== Changes in preliminary assignments ==
The International Skating Union published the preliminary list of entrants on 27 September 2025.

Date	Discipline	Withdrew	Added	Ref.
26 September	Women	(Kazakhstan); Sofia Samodelkina	(Kazakhstan); Russalina Shakrova	
30 September	Women	(Finland); Janna Jyrkinen	—N/a	
30 September	Ice dance	(Italy); Denisa Cimlova; Stefano Frasca	—N/a	
30 September	Ice dance	(Italy); Giulia Isabella Paolino; Andrea Tuba	—N/a	
30 September	Ice dance	—N/a	(Germany); Charise Matthaei; Max Liebers	
1 October	Men	(Finland); Valtter Virtanen	—N/a	

== Required performance elements ==
=== Single skating ===
Men and women competing in single skating first performed their short programs on 2 October. Lasting 2 minutes 40 seconds (+/− 10 seconds), the short program had to include the following elements:

For men: one double or triple Axel; one triple or quadruple jump; one jump combination consisting of a double jump and a triple jump, two triple jumps, or a quadruple jump and a double jump or triple jump; one flying spin; one camel spin or sit spin with a change of foot; one spin combination with a change of foot; and a step sequence using the full ice surface.

For women: one double or triple Axel; one triple jump; one jump combination consisting of a double jump and a triple jump, or two triple jumps; one flying spin; one layback spin, sideways leaning spin, camel spin, or sit spin without a change of foot; one spin combination with a change of foot; and one step sequence using the full ice surface.

Women performed their free skates on 3 October, while men performed theirs on 4 October. Lasting 4 minutes (+/− 10 seconds), the free skate had to include the following: seven jump elements, of which one had to be an Axel-type jump; three spins, of which one had to be a spin combination, one a flying spin, and one a spin with only one position; a step sequence; and a choreographic sequence.

=== Ice dance ===
Couples competing in ice dance performed their rhythm dances on 3 October. Lasting 2 minutes 50 seconds (+/− 10 seconds), the theme of the rhythm dance this season was "music, dance styles, and feeling of the 1990s". Examples of applicable dance styles and music included pop, Latin, house, techno, hip-hop, and grunge. The rhythm dance had to include the following elements: one pattern dance step sequence, one choreographic rhythm sequence, one dance lift, one set of sequential twizzles, and one step sequence.

Couples then performed their free dances on 4 October. Lasting 4 minutes (+/− 10 seconds), the free dance had to include the following: three dance lifts, one dance spin, one set of synchronized twizzles, one step sequence in hold, one step sequence while on one skate and not touching, and three choreographic elements.

== Judging ==
Skaters were judged according to the required technical elements of their program (such as jumps and spins), as well as the overall presentation of their program, based on three program components (skating skills, presentation, and composition). Each technical element in a figure skating performance was assigned a predetermined base point value and scored by a panel of nine judges on a scale from −5 to +5 based on the quality of its execution. Each Grade of Execution (GOE) from –5 to +5 was assigned a value as indicated on the Scale of Values. For example, a triple Axel was worth a base value of 8.00 points, and a GOE of +3 was worth 2.40 points, so a triple Axel with a GOE of +3 earned 10.40 points. The judging panel's GOE for each element was determined by calculating the trimmed mean (the average after discarding the highest and lowest scores). The panel's scores for all elements were added together to generate a Total Elements Score. At the same time, the judges evaluated each performance based on the five aforementioned program components and assigned each a score from 0.25 to 10 in 0.25-point increments. The judging panel's final score for each program component was also determined by calculating the trimmed mean. Those scores were then multiplied by the factor shown on the chart below; the results were added together to generate a total Program Component Score.

Program component factoring
Discipline	Short program or Rhythm dance	Free skate or Free dance
Men	1.67	3.33
Women	1.33	2.67
Ice dance	1.33	2.00

Deductions were applied for certain violations, such as time infractions or falls. The Total Elements Score and Program Component Score were then added together, minus any deductions, to generate a final performance score for each skater or team.

== Medal summary ==
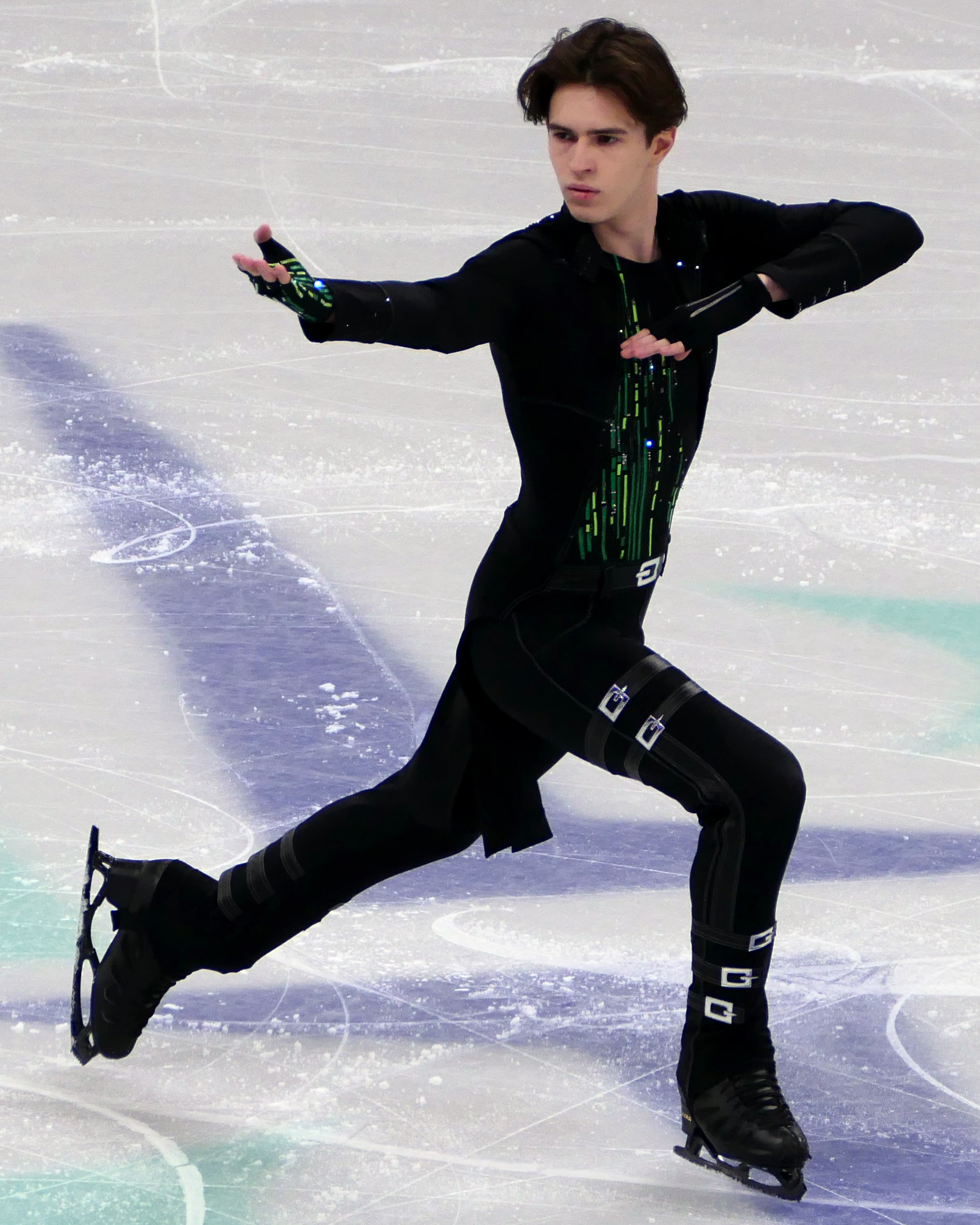
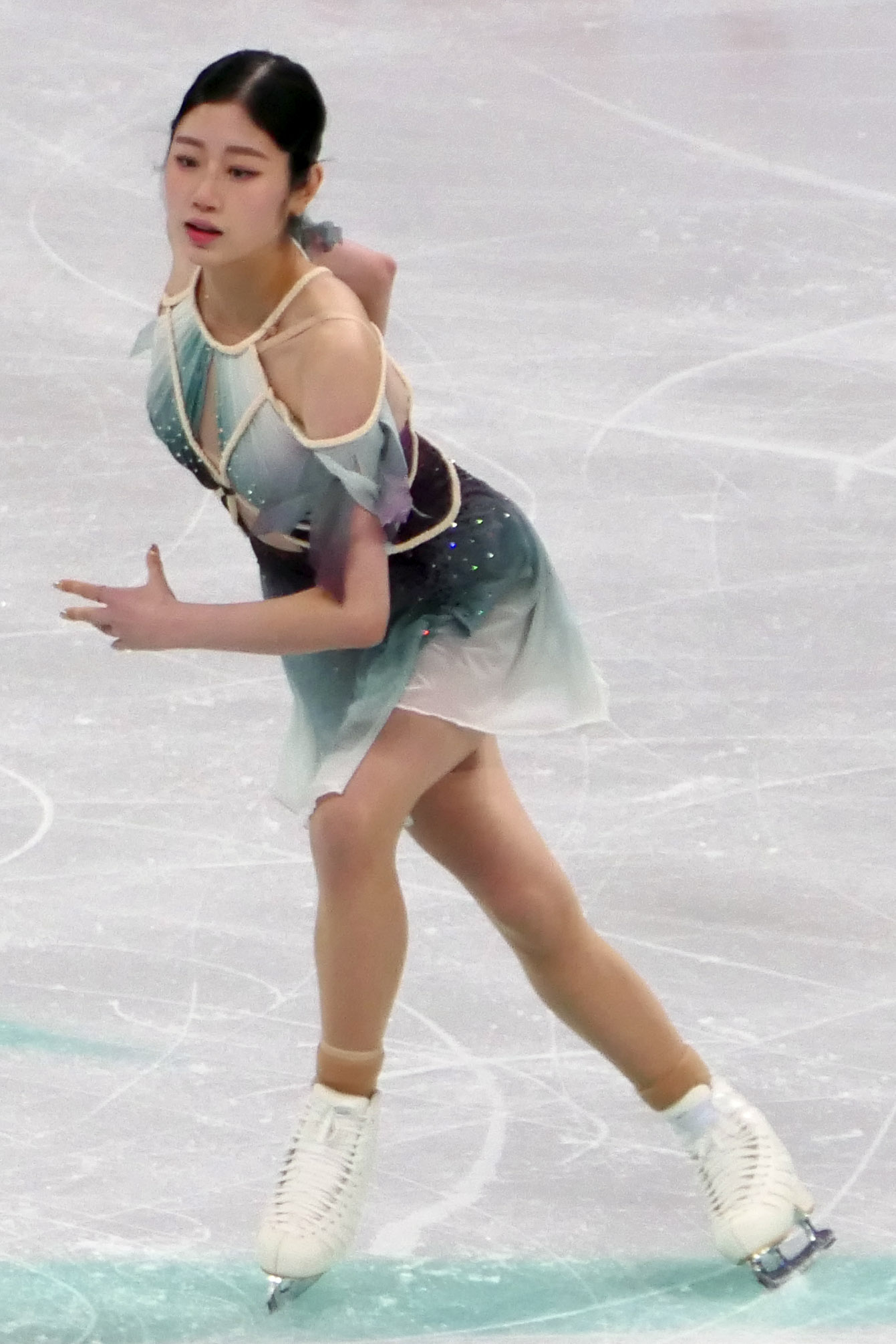
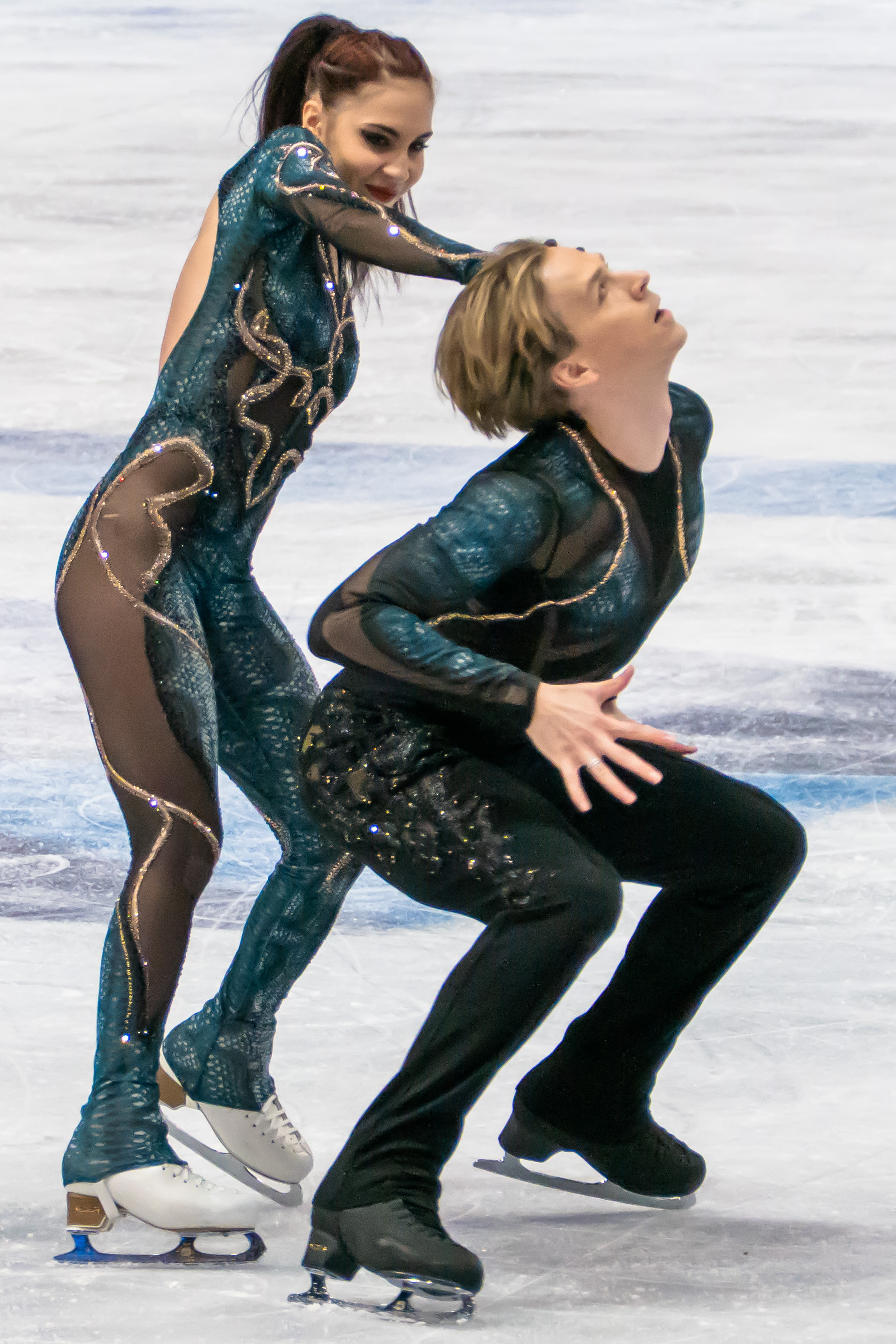
The 2025 Denis Ten Memorial champions: Mikhail Shaidorov of Kazakhstan (men's singles); Lee Hae-in of South Korea (women's singles); and Diana Davis and Gleb Smolkin of Georgia (ice dance)

Medalists
Discipline	Gold	Silver	Bronze
Men	(Kazakhstan) Mikhail Shaidorov	(Georgia (country)) Nika Egadze	(United States) Jason Brown
Women	(South Korea) Lee Hae-in	(South Korea) Yun Ah-sun	(Canada) Madeline Schizas
Ice dance	(Georgia (country)); Diana Davis; Gleb Smolkin	(United States); Oona Brown; Gage Brown	(Sweden); Milla Ruud Reitan; Nikolaj Majorov

== Results ==
=== Men's singles ===
Mikhail Shaidorov of Kazakhstan, who had won the gold medal at the 2024 Denis Ten Memorial Challenge, repeated that victory this year, defeating his nearest competitor by a margin of over fifteen points. Shaidorov credited Denis Ten as a personal hero and continued Ten's efforts to promote figure skating in Kazakhstan. "The most important thing that I can do for my country is to make this sport more popular," Shaidorov stated in an interview afterward. "What matters most to me right now is that many children are coming to this sport, that they are starting to do figure skating and it inspires them... Even if you are from a country that is not strong in the world of figure skating, you can have big success." As the only skater in the world to perform a quadruple jump as the second element in a jump combination in competition, Shaidorov opened his free skate with a triple Axel-Euler-quadruple Salchow jump combination and then followed it with a quadruple Lutz and a quadruple flip. Nika Egadze of Georgia finished in second place, while Jason Brown of the United States finished third. Cha Jun-hwan of South Korea withdrew from the competition after the short program because problems with his boots were adversely affecting his jumps.

Men's results
Rank	Skater	Nation	Total points	SP		FS	
1st place, gold medalist(s)	Mikhail Shaidorov	Kazakhstan	282.22	1	95.01	1	187.21
2nd place, silver medalist(s)	Nika Egadze	Georgia	266.90	2	87.58	2	179.32
3rd place, bronze medalist(s)	Jason Brown	United States	257.81	3	86.61	3	171.20
4	Lee Si-hyeong	South Korea	242.52	4	78.81	4	163.71
5	Chen Yudong	China	237.70	8	76.41	5	161.29
6	Vladimir Litvintsev	Azerbaijan	223.47	5	78.52	6	144.95
7	Matthew Newnham	Canada	219.53	6	77.16	7	142.37
8	Cha Young-hyun	South Korea	218.48	9	76.37	8	142.11
9	Taira Shinohara	United States	213.90	11	74.20	9	139.70
10	Semen Daniliants	Armenia	209.38	10	74.43	11	134.55
11	Dias Jirenbayev	Kazakhstan	208.68	7	77.14	12	131.54
12	Andreas Nordebäck	Sweden	205.66	14	70.11	10	135.55
13	Zhao Qihan	China	194.62	15	68.79	13	125.83
14	John Kim	Canada	188.70	12	73.62	15	115.08
15	Nikita Krivosheyev	Kazakhstan	178.83	16	59.33	14	119.50
16	Oleg Melnikov	Kazakhstan	160.20	17	54.19	16	106.01
WD	Cha Jun-hwan	South Korea	Withdrew	13	70.78	Withdrew from competition	

=== Women's singles ===
Lee Hae-in of South Korea easily won the women's event with a 22-point lead over her nearest competitor. Lee's free skate featured a triple loop and a triple Lutz-triple toe loop jump combination. Competition for second and third place was more fierce, with the four skaters after Lee – Madeline Schizas of Canada, Josephine Lee of the United States, Yun Ah-sun of South Korea, and Zhu Yi of China – scored within a margin of three points following the short program. Yun ultimately won the silver medal, while Schizas won the bronze.

Women's results
Rank	Skater	Nation	Total points	SP		FS	
1st place, gold medalist(s)	Lee Hae-in	South Korea	196.84	1	64.78	1	132.06
2nd place, silver medalist(s)	Yun Ah-sun	South Korea	174.37	4	53.43	2	120.94
3rd place, bronze medalist(s)	Madeline Schizas	Canada	164.39	2	55.55	3	108.84
4	Josephine Lee	United States	160.92	3	54.15	5	106.77
5	Zhu Yi	China	160.83	5	52.75	4	108.08
6	Amira Irmatova	Kazakhstan	137.15	6	47.22	6	89.93
7	Nuriya Suleimen	Kazakhstan	124.40	7	44.95	7	79.45
8	Olesja Leonova	Estonia	118.09	8	43.20	8	74.89
9	Sofiya Farafonova	Kazakhstan	104.50	9	42.47	9	62.03
10	Veronika Kovalenko	Kazakhstan	86.12	10	39.57	10	46.55
11	Russalina Shakrova	Kazakhstan	74.71	11	30.59	11	44.12

=== Ice dance ===
Diana Davis and Gleb Smolkin of Georgia dominated the competition, winning both the rhythm dance and free dance by wide margins, earning themselves the gold. The Denis Ten Memorial Challenge was the first of three competitions in a row for Davis and Smolkin: the following week, they competed at the 2025 Trialeti Trophy, and the week after at the 2025 Grand Prix de France. Davis and Smolkin won the Trialeti Trophy as well, netting two Challenger Series victories in a row. Oona Brown and Gage Brown of the United States finished in second place, while Milla Ruud Reitan and Nikolaj Majorov of Sweden finished in third.

Ice dance results
Rank	Skater	Nation	Total points	RD		FD	
1st place, gold medalist(s)	Diana Davis; Gleb Smolkin	Georgia	193.14	1	77.94	1	115.20
2nd place, silver medalist(s)	Oona Brown; Gage Brown	United States	178.86	2	73.91	4	104.95
3rd place, bronze medalist(s)	Milla Ruud Reitan; Nikolaj Majorov	Sweden	177.25	3	69.22	2	108.03
4	Alicia Fabbri; Paul Ayer	Canada	173.34	4	67.84	3	105.50
5	Leah Neset; Artem Markelov	United States	169.60	5	67.80	5	101.80
6	Sofía Val; Asaf Kazimov	Spain	165.61	6	66.09	6	99.52
7	Charise Matthaei; Max Liebers	Germany	162.77	7	65.39	7	97.38
8	Philomène Sabourin; Raul Bermejo	Spain	137.68	8	54.50	8	83.18
9	Gaukhar Nauryzova; Boyisangur Datiev	Kazakhstan	131.59	9	50.56	9	81.03
10	Kristina Dobroserdova; Alessandro Pellegrini	Armenia	123.13	10	48.65	10	74.48

== Works cited ==
- "Special Regulations & Technical Rules – Single & Pair Skating and Ice Dance 2024" (PDF). International Skating Union. Archived (PDF) from the original on 3 June 2025.
