= Josephine Lee =

American figure skater

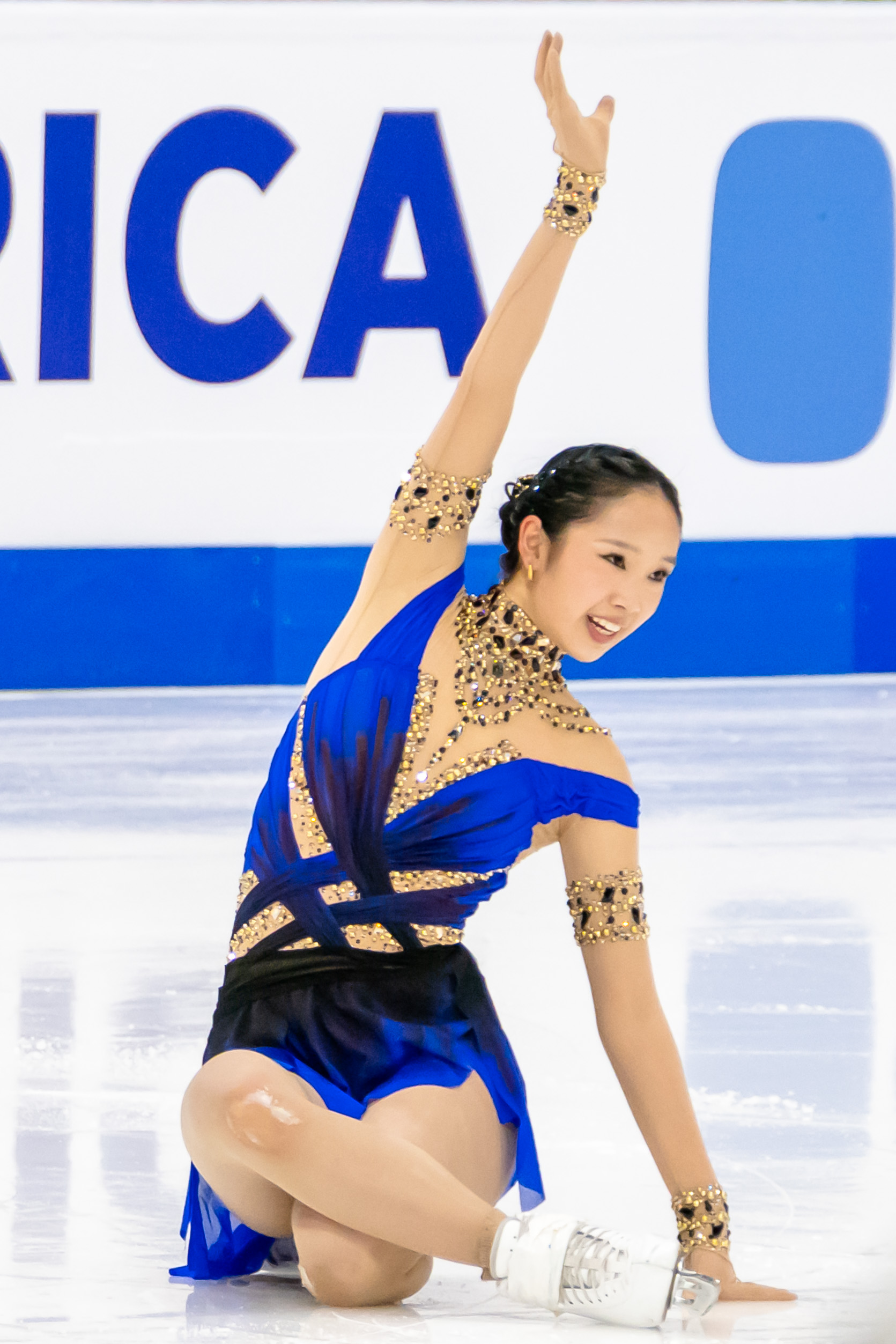
- Lee at the 2025 Skate America

Personal information
- Native name: 李岱颖
- Born: 3 February 2008 (age 18) Newport Beach, California
- Home town: Irvine, California
- Height: 165 cm (5 ft 5 in)

Figure skating career
- Country: United States
- Discipline: Women's singles
- Coach: Amy Evidente; Ivan Dinev; Jonathan Cassar
- Skating club: All Year Figure Skating Club
- Began skating: 2012
Medal record
U.S. Championships
Silver medal – second place	2024 Columbus	Singles

Josephine Lee (born 3 February 2008) is an American figure skater. She is the 2024 U.S. national silver medalist. On the junior level, she is the 2022 U.S. junior national bronze medalist, as well as the 2023 Cranberry Cup bronze medalist.

== Personal life ==
Josephine Lee was born on February 3, 2008 in Newport Beach, California, United States. Her mother, Caroline Tseng, is a Taiwanese attorney and her father, Jay Lee, is an applications developer. Lee also has a younger brother, Jonathan.

She attended high school at California Connection Academy and is currently a student at Columbia University. Lee aspires to attend medical school and become a plastic surgeon following her figure skating career.

== Career ==
=== Early years ===
Lee began skating at the age of four when her dad took her to a rink near his office. According to her, she fell in love with the challenge the sport gave her. Her first coaches were Vitali Novikov and Shannon Pecca. At the age of twelve, she began training under Amy Evidente.

In 2019, she experienced a stress fracture in her spine due to an overuse injury.

=== 2021–2022 season: Junior international debut ===
Lee made her international debut on the Junior Grand Prix series, finishing eighth at 2021 JGP France. She then went on to make her national debut at the 2022 U.S. Junior Championships, winning the bronze medal. Lee later said, "That result was when I realised that it started to get serious and I can actually go somewhere."

=== 2022–2023 season ===
Going into the season, Lee was assigned to two Grand Prix events, both in Poland. At the end of September, she finished ninth at the 2022 JGP Solidarity Cup and the following week, placed seventh at the 2022 JGP Baltic Cup.

In January, Lee made her senior national debut at the 2023 U.S. Championships. She placed eleventh in the short program and fourth in the free skate to finish in fifth place overall. Selected to compete at the 2023 World Junior Championships the following month, Lee placed fourteenth in the short program and twenty-first in the free skate to finish in nineteenth place overall.

=== 2023–2024 season: U.S. national silver ===
Going into the season, Lee underwent a significant growth spurt which she later acknowledged to be a challenging adjustment. She began her season on the junior level by winning the bronze medal at the 2023 Cranberry Cup. Three weeks later, she competed at the 2023 JGP in Austria, finishing in eighth place overall.

In January, Lee competed on the senior level at the 2024 U.S. Championships. After placing fifth in the short program segment, Lee went on to win the free skate and capture the silver medal. Regarding her placement, Lee said, "I cried like three times. After my free skate, my (fake) eyelashes fell off because I cried them off. I was crying so much, but I was also trying to cover my face so no one could see the eyelashes falling off...I didn’t know where I would place. Going into this event, I had no expectations. After my long program, I expected maybe, at most, fourth, so I was just really happy with how I did. I didn’t really think about my placement at the time."

Going on to compete at the 2024 World Junior Championships, garnering new season's best scores across all competition segments and finishing twentieth overall. Following her free skate, Lee shared, "I didn’t expect to come here as I had a pretty rough start of the season. I went into Nationals thinking it would be my last event and just wanted to show what I can do. I want to approach this event the same way."

=== 2024–2025 season ===
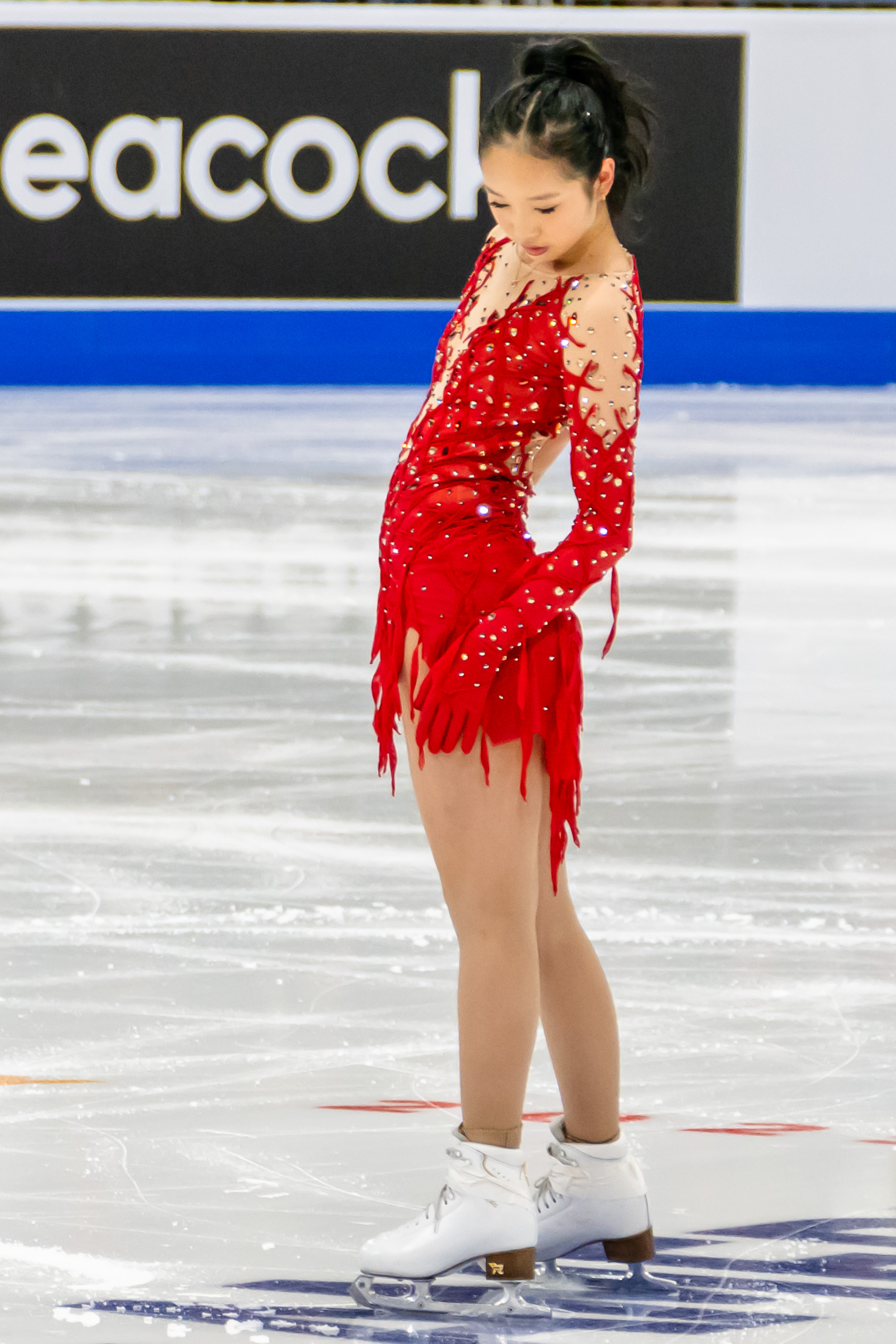
Lee performing her short program at the 2025 Skate America

Lee began her final junior season in August by competing at 2024 JGP Czech Republic, where she finished in fifth place. A couple months later, Lee won the bronze medal at the 2024 Tallinn Trophy and finished fourth at the 2024 Santa Claus Cup.

In January, Lee concluded her season with a seventh-place finish at the 2025 U.S. Championships. She said afterward, "I'm really relieved that I just got through everything coming into this competition, I had pneumonia, like a week and a half ago, so I just had, like, one week of training, so I was a little worried that I wouldn’t be able to get through this program. But thankfully, I got through, and I did a lot more than I expected."

=== 2025–2026 season: Senior international debut ===
Lee opened her season by making her senior international debut by competing on the Challenger Series, finishing fifth at the 2025 CS Cranberry Cup International and fourth at the 2025 Denis Ten Memorial Challenge.

Selected as one of the host picks for 2025 Skate America, Lee made her senior Grand Prix debut at the event where she placed twelfth in both the short program and free skate segments to finish in twelfth place overall.

In January, Lee competed at the 2026 U.S. Championships. After placing eighth in the short program, she struggled throughout her free skate where she fell three times and received a number of under-rotation and downgrade calls from the technical panel. She ultimately placed eighteenth in that competition segment, dropping to sixteenth place overall.

== Programs ==
Competition programs by season
Season	Short program	Free skate program
2021–22	"Please Don't Make Me Love You": From Dracula, the Musical; Composed by Frank Wildhorn; Performed by Katherine Shindle; Choreo. by Derrick Delmore & Cindy Stuart	Don Quixote: 1. Pas de deux; Performed by London Symphony Orchestra & Richard Bonynge; 2. Act: Entrée of Basil, Scene of Kitri & Basil; Performed by Mariinsky Theatre Orchestra & Victor Fedotov; 3. Act IV: Coda; Performed by Sofia Philharmonic Orchestra & Boris Spassov; Composed by Ludwig Minkus; Choreo. by Derrick Delmore & Cindy Stuart
2022–23	"Letting Go": Performed by Saara Aalto; Choreo. by Massimo Scali & Jamie Isley	Carmina Burana: 1. O Fortuna; Performed by Jenny Oaks Baker; 2. In trutina; Performed by Joshua Bell, Michael Stern, & Orchestra of St. Luke's; Composed by Carl Orff; Choreo. by Massimo Scali & Jamie Isley
2023–24	"I Love Paris/J'aime Paris": Composed by Cole Porter; Performed by Zaz ft. Nikki Yanofsky; Choreo. by Massimo Scali & Cindy Stuart	"Flamenco": 1. Poeta en el viento 2. Amor, Dulce Muerte; Composed by Vicente Amigo; Choreo. by Massimo Scali & Cindy Stuart
2024–25	"Objection (Tango)": Performed by Shakira; Choreo. by Kaitlyn Weaver	"Piano Concerto No. 2 in C Minor, Op. 18": 1. I. Maestoso; Performed by Boris Berezovsky, Orchestre Philharmonique de l'Oural, & Dmitry Liss; 2. II. Adagio sostenuto; Performed by Evgeny Kissin, Valery Gergiev, & London Symphony Orchestra; 3. III. Allegro Scherzando; Performed by Boris Berezovsky, Orchestre Philharmonique de l'Oural, & Dmitry Liss; Composed by Sergei Rachmaninoff; Choreo. by Massimo Scali
2025–26	"Objection (Tango)"	Scheherazade, Op. 35: 1. II. Lento; 2. III. Andantino quasi allegretto 3. IV. Allegro molto; Composed by Nikolai Rimsky-Korsakov; Performed by Leon Spierer, Berlin Philharmonic, & Lorin Maazel; Choreo. by Massimo Scali

== Competitive highlights ==
- GP – Event of the ISU Grand Prix Series
- JGP – Event of the ISU Junior Grand Prix Series
- CS – Event of the ISU Challenger Series
- TBD – Assigned
- WD – Withdrew from competition

Competition placements at senior level
Season	2022–23	2023–24	2024–25	2025–26
U.S. Championships	5th	2nd	7th	16th
GP Skate America				12th
CS Cranberry Cup				5th
CS Denis Ten Memorial				4th

Competition placements at junior level
Season	2021–22	2022–23	2023–24	2024–25
World Junior Championships		19th	20th	
U.S. Championships	3rd			
JGP Austria			8th	
JGP Czech Republic				5th
JGP France	8th			
JGP Poland I		9th		
JGP Poland II		7th		
Cranberry Cup			3rd	
Santa Claus Cup				4th
Tallinn Trophy				3rd

== Detailed results ==
ISU personal best scores in the +5/-5 GOE System
Segment	Type	Score	Event
Total	TSS	169.42	2022 JGP Poland
Short program	TSS	61.72	2022 JGP Poland
Short program	TES	34.36	2022 JGP Poland
Short program	PCS	27.93	2023 World Junior Championships
Free skating	TSS	115.14	2022 JGP Poland
Free skating	TES	61.74	2022 JGP Poland
Free skating	PCS	55.00	2025 CS Denis Ten Memorial Challenge

=== Senior level ===
Results in the 2022–23 season
Date	Event	SP		FS		Total	
Date	Event	P	Score	P	Score	P	Score
Jan 23–29, 2023	(United States) 2023 U.S. Championships	11	55.60	4	132.08	5	187.68

Results in the 2023–24 season
Date	Event	SP		FS		Total	
Date	Event	P	Score	P	Score	P	Score
Jan 22–28, 2024	(United States) 2024 U.S. Championships	5	65.28	1	138.85	2	204.13

Results in the 2024–25 season
Date	Event	SP		FS		Total	
Date	Event	P	Score	P	Score	P	Score
Jan 20–26, 2024	(United States) 2025 U.S. Championships	10	60.10	6	122.59	7	182.69

Results in the 2025–26 season
Date	Event	SP		FS		Total	
Date	Event	P	Score	P	Score	P	Score
Aug 7–10, 2025	(United States) 2025 CS Cranberry Cup	5	56.04	5	104.95	5	160.99
Oct 1–4, 2025	(Kazakhstan) 2025 CS Denis Ten Memorial	3	54.15	5	106.77	4	160.92
Nov 14–16, 2025	(United States) 2025 Skate America	12	54.24	12	93.04	12	147.28
Jan 4–11, 2026	(United States) 2026 U.S. Championships	8	62.79	18	89.52	16	152.31

=== Junior level ===
Results in the 2021–22 season
Date	Event	SP		FS		Total	
Date	Event	P	Score	P	Score	P	Score
Aug 25–28, 2021	2021 JGP France II	7	51.30	7	93.67	8	144.97
Jan 4–9, 2022	(United States) 2022 U.S. Championships (Junior)	3	60.61	4	111.47	3	172.08

Results in the 2022–23 season
Date	Event	SP		FS		Total	
Date	Event	P	Score	P	Score	P	Score
Sep 28 – Oct 1, 2022	(Poland) 2022 JGP Solidarity Cup	13	53.87	7	115.14	9	169.01
Oct 5–8, 2022	(Poland) 2022 JGP Baltic Cup	4	61.72	7	107.70	7	169.42
Feb 27 – Mar 5, 2023	(Canada) 2023 World Junior Championships	14	56.09	21	82.13	19	138.22

Results in the 2023–24 season
Date	Event	SP		FS		Total	
Date	Event	P	Score	P	Score	P	Score
Aug 10–14, 2023	(United States) 2023 Cranberry Cup	1	57.20	5	99.51	3	156.71
Aug 30 – Sep 2, 2023	2023 JGP Austria	7	51.15	9	100.25	8	151.40
Feb 26 – Mar 3, 2024	(Chinese Taipei) 2024 World Junior Championships	20	54.33	19	107.41	20	161.74

Results in the 2024–25 season
Date	Event	SP		FS		Total	
Date	Event	P	Score	P	Score	P	Score
Sep 4–7, 2024	2024 JGP Czech Republic	7	57.65	8	108.89	5	166.54
Nov 12–17, 2024	(Estonia) 2024 Tallinn Trophy	7	53.27	1	120.75	3	174.02
Nov 27 – Dec 2, 2024	(Hungary) 2024 Santa Claus Cup	6	50.48	3	107.14	4	157.62
