= Evaristo Carriego =

Argentine poet

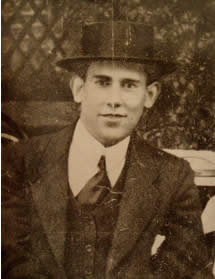

Evaristo Carriego (Paraná, May 7, 1883 – Buenos Aires, October 13, 1912), was an Argentine poet, best known today for the biography written about him by Jorge Luis Borges.

He was an important influence on the writing of tango lyrics, and in homage the famous instrumental tango "A Evaristo Carriego" was written by Eduardo Rovira, and recorded by Orquesta Osvaldo Pugliese in 1969.

He is buried at the Cementerio de la Chacarita in Buenos Aires.

== Works ==
- Misas herejes (Heretic Masses) (1908)
- La canción del barrio (Slum Chant)
