= Tom Bouvart =

French pair skater (born 2002)

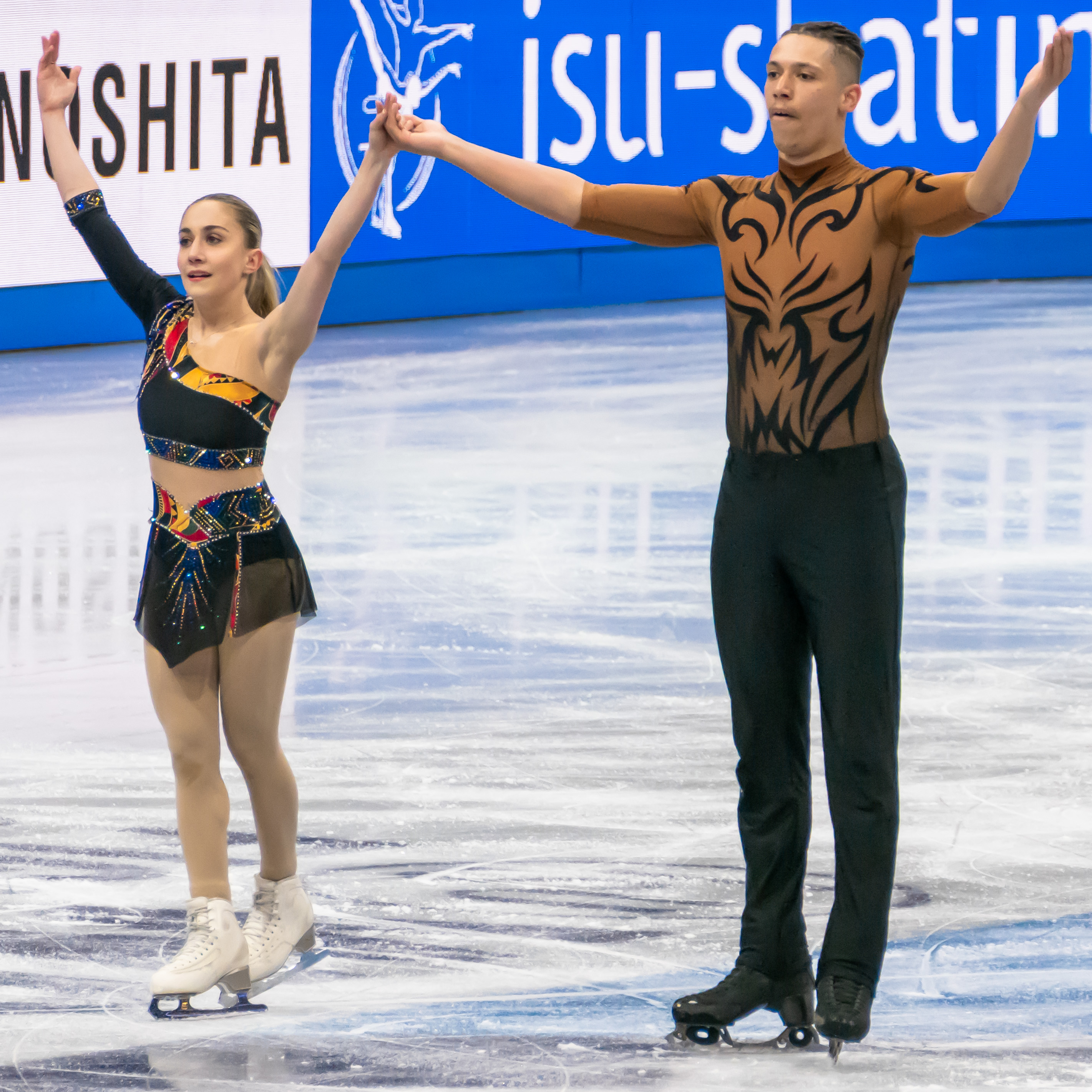
- Oxana Vouillamoz and Tom Bouvart at the 2025 World Championships

Personal information
- Born: 11 January 2002 (age 24) Meulan-en-Yvelines, France
- Home town: Aproz, Switzerland
- Height: 1.84 m (6 ft 1/2 in)

Figure skating career
- Country: Switzerland (since 2024); France
- Discipline: Pair skating (since 2022); Men's singles (until 2020)
- Partner: Oxana Vouillamoz (since 2024); Coline Keriven (2022–23)
- Coach: Claude Peri; Lola Esbrat
- Began skating: 2007

Medal record
Swiss Championships
Gold medal – first place	2025 Geneva	Pairs
Gold medal – first place	2026 Lugano	Pairs

Tom Bouvart (born 11 January 2002) is a French pair skater who currently represents Switzerland. With his current skating partner, Oxana Vouillamoz, he is a two-time Swiss national champion (2025-26), the 2026 Skate Canada International bronze medalist, the 2025 CS Golden Spin of Zagreb bronze medalist, and the 2024 NRW Trophy gold medalist.

As a singles skater, he is the 2019 Master's de Patinage champion on the junior level and the 2020 French junior national bronze medalist.

== Personal life ==
Bouvart was born on January 11, 2002, in Meulan-en-Yvelines, France.

== Career ==
=== Early years and singles skating career ===
Bouvart began figure skating in 2007. He was first coached by Christine Leloir-Plisson. He debuted as a novice skater at the 2016 French Championships, where he finished fifth. The following year, he won the silver medal at the 2017 French Novice Championships and eleventh at the 2017 French Junior Championships.

During the 2017–18 figure skating season, Bouvart finished sixth at the 2017 Master's de Patinage, second on the junior level at the 2017 Denkova-Staviski Cup, and tenth at the 2018 French Junior Championships. The subsequent season saw Bouvart placing fifth at the 2018 Master's de Patinage on the junior level, fourth at the 2019 French Junior Championships, seventh at the senior national championships, and second on the junior level at the 2019 Coupe du Printemps.

Prior to the 2019–20 figure skating season, it was announced that Bouvart had begun training under Didier Lucine, Sophie Golaz, and Claudine Lucine at the SGA Patinage Annecy in Annecy, France. Competing on the 2019–20 ISU Junior Grand Prix, he finished sixteenth at 2019 JGP Latvia. Going on to compete on the junior level at the 2019 Master's de Patinage, Bouvart won the gold medal. Subsequently, he finished eleventh on the senior level at the 2019 Denkova-Staviski Cup. In February 2020, following a bronze medal win at the 2020 French Junior Championships and fifth on the junior level at the 2020 International Challenge Cup.

=== Pair skating with Coline Keriven for France ===
==== 2022–23 season ====
In March 2022, it was announced that Bouvart had decided to pursue pair skating and had teamed up with fellow French pair skater, Coline Keriven, and that the pair would train under Claude Péri in Paris and Bruno Massot in Caen.

The pair debuted at the 2022 Master's de Patinage, where they finished in fourth place. They then went on to place sixth at the 2022 Trophée Métropole Nice Côte d'Azur and twelfth at the 2022 CS Warsaw Cup. Keriven/Bouvart subsequently finished the season by placing ninth at the 2023 Bavarian Open. Shortly following the event, Keriven announced her retirement from competitive figure skating.

=== Pair skating with Oxana Vouillamoz for Switzerland ===
==== 2024–25 season: Debut of Vouillamoz/Bouvart for Switzerland ====
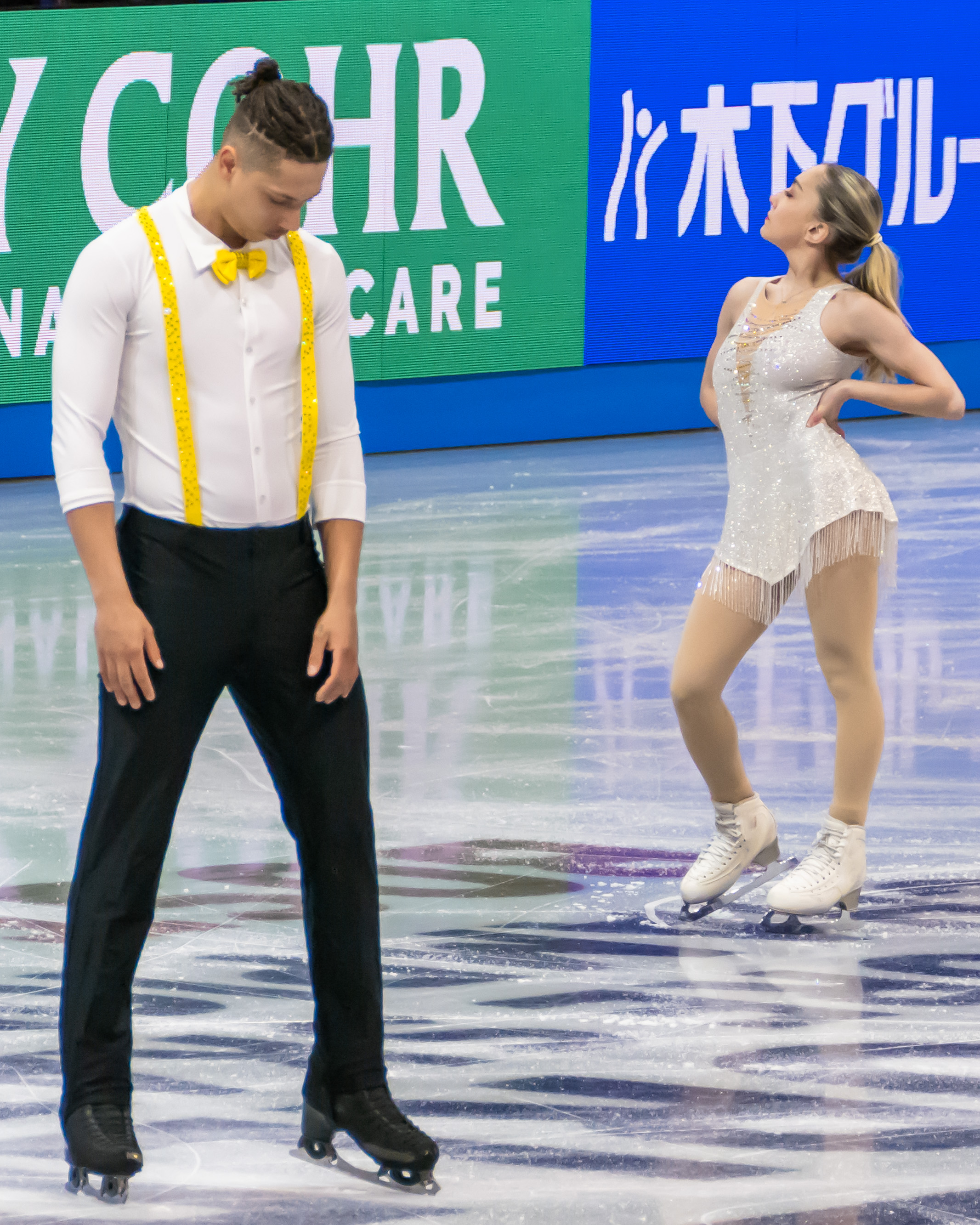
Vouillamoz and Bouvart in their starting pose for their short program at the 2025 World Championships

On April 18, 2024, Swiss Ice Skating posted a list of their senior international pair team for the upcoming season, listing Swiss pair skater Oxana Vouillamoz with Bouvart as her partner, indicating that they would be skating for Switzerland. It was subsequently announced that they would train in Paris under coaches Claude Péri and Lola Esbrat.

The pair debuted in late November at the 2024 NRW Trophy, where they won the gold medal. At the event, they earned the required minimum technical scores to compete at the World Championships. They would follow this up by finishing fourth at the 2024 CS Warsaw Cup.

In December, the pair would win gold at the 2025 Swiss Championships. The following month, Vouillamoz/Bouvart competed on the junior level at the 2025 Bavarian Open, where they won the silver medal. One week later, the pair competed at the 2025 European Championships in Tallinn, Estonia, where they placed thirteenth.

Towards the end of February, Vouillamoz/Bouvart competed at the 2025 World Junior Championships in Debrecen, Hungary. They placed sixth in the short program and fourth in the free skate, finishing in fourth place overall. The pair were less than two points off the podium. Following the event, Vouillamoz said, "We are pretty happy with this [free skate] performance. We’re still a new team, so for us, every competition is about gaining experience. Of course, we wish we could have done better, there’s always room to grow, but overall, we’re satisfied with what we did today."

Going on to compete at the 2025 World Championships in Boston, Massachusetts, United States, the pair came in twentieth place.

==== 2025–26 season ====
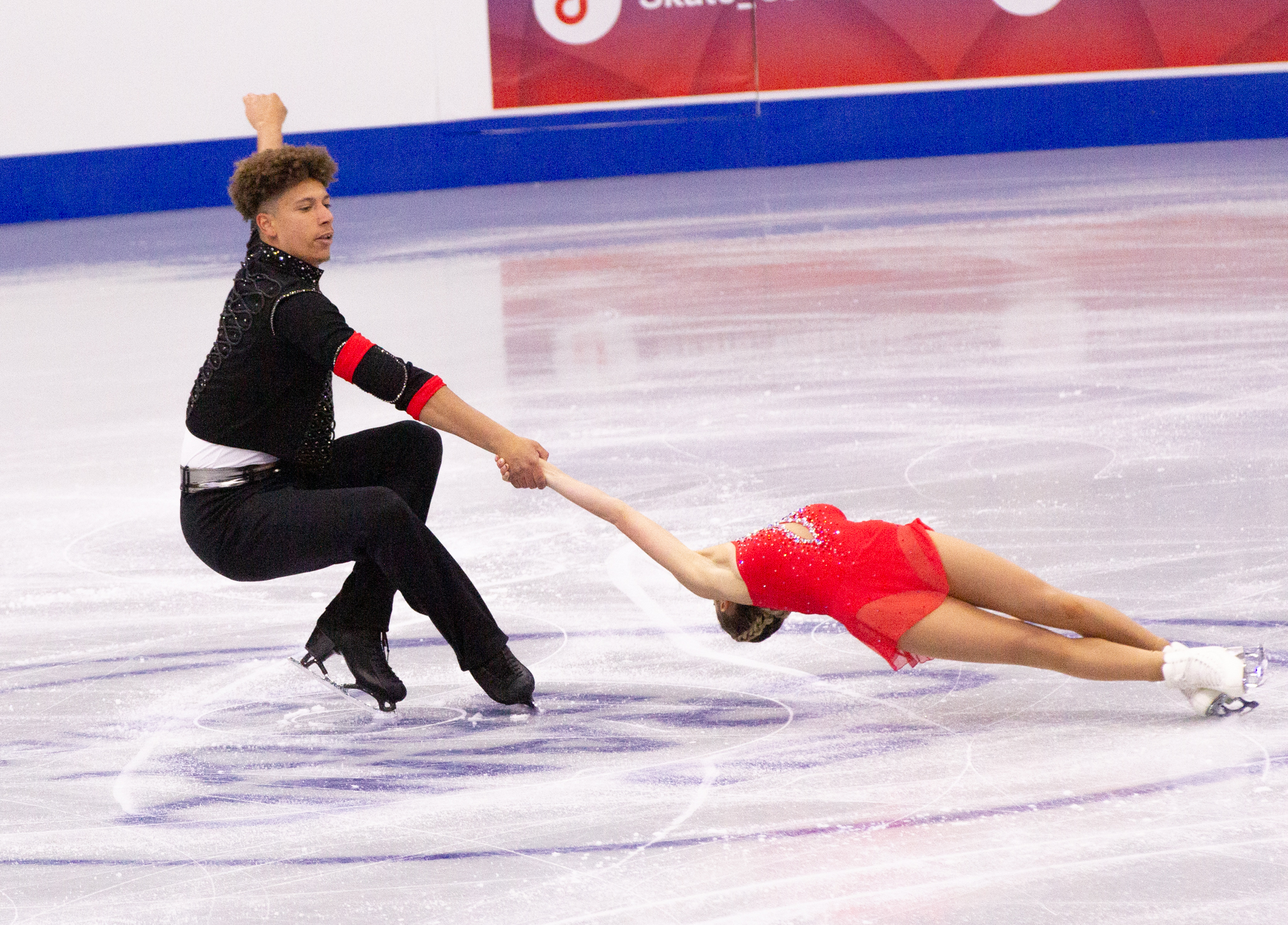
Vouillamoz and Bouvart performing a death spiral during their short program at 2025 Skate Canada International

Vouillamoz/Bouvart opened the season by finishing ninth at the 2025 CS Nebelhorn Trophy and winning gold at the 2025 Swiss Open. They then went on to make their Grand Prix debut at 2025 Skate Canada International, where they finished in seventh place.

In December, the pair won the bronze medal at the 2025 CS Golden Spin of Zagreb before winning their second national title at the 2026 Swiss Championships. The following month, Vouillamoz/Bouvart competed at the 2026 European Championships in Sheffield, England, United Kingdom, where they scored personal bests in the free skate and combined total segments, finishing in fifth place. "We are feeling really, really happy," said Bouvart following their free skate. "We did what we wanted to do and I’m really happy to do this here at the European Championships. It’s a really big motivation for the future."

=== 2026–27 season ===
Vouillamoz/Bouvart opened their season at 2026 CS Nebelhorn Trophy in September, placing fifth. The team then went on to win the bronze medal at 2026 Skate Canada International. “I’m happy! I’m happy! I’m focused before the skate,” said Bouvart after the free skate. “I try to enjoy more. When I skate with fun, it’s easy, you know? So, I think it’s a good base for work for the future.”

== Programs ==
=== With Vouillamoz for Switzerland ===
Season	Short program	Free skating
2025–2026	Liberian Girl; Remember the Time; Smooth Criminal by Michael Jackson choreo. by Mahil Chantelauze	Clubbed to Death (Epic Version) (from The Matrix) by Rob Dougan choreo. by John Zimmerman, Silvia Fontana
2024–2025	The Mask; This Business of Love by Domino; Hey Pachuco by Royal Crown Revue choreo. by Mérovée Ephrem, Laurent Porteret	Blood Diamond; Crossing the Bridge; Village Attack; Solomon Vandy by James Newton Howard choreo. by Mérovée Ephrem, Laurent Porteret

=== As a singles skater for France ===
Season	Short program	Free skating
2019–2020	Les copains d'abord performed by Ken Gordon and Band choreo. by Mérovée Ephrem	Goodbye by Russ; Freedom by Pharrell Williams choreo. by Mérovée Ephrem

== Competitive highlights ==
- CS – Event of the ISU Challenger Series
- TBD – Assigned
- WD – Withdrew from competition

=== Pair skating with Oxana Vouillamoz (for Switzerland) ===
Competition placements at senior level
Season	2024–25	2025–26	2026–27
World Championships	20th	10th	
European Championships	13th	5th	
Swiss Championships	1st	1st	
GP Skate America			4th
GP Skate Canada		7th	3rd
CS Golden Spin of Zagreb		3rd	
CS Nebelhorn Trophy		9th	5th
CS Warsaw Cup	4th		
NRW Trophy	1st		
Swiss Open		1st	

Competition placements at junior level
Season	2024–25
World Junior Championships	4th
Bavarian Open	2nd

=== Pair skating with Coline Keriven (for France) ===
Competition placements at senior level
Season	2022–23
CS Warsaw Cup	12th
Bavarian Open	9th
Trophée Métropole Nice	6th
Master's de Patinage	4th

=== Single skating (for France) ===
Competition placements at senior level
Season	2018–19	2019–20
Denkova-Staviski Cup		11th
Egna Spring Trophy	8th	
Volvo Open Cup	11th	
French Championships	7th	

Competition placements at junior level
Season	2016–17	2017–18	2018–19	2019–20
JGP Latvia				16th
Challenge Cup				5th
Coupe du Printemps		8th	2nd	
Denkova-Staviski Cup		2nd		
Ice Star			6th	
French Championships	11th	10th	4th	3rd
Master's de Patinage		6th	5th	1st

== Detailed results ==
=== Pair skating with Oxana Vouillamoz (for Switzerland) ===
ISU personal best scores in the +5/-5 GOE System
Segment	Type	Score	Event
Total	TSS	184.56	2026 World Championships
Short program	TSS	70.63	2026 Skate America
Short program	TES	40.94	2026 Skate America
Short program	PCS	29.69	2026 Skate America
Free skating	TSS	124.44	2026 World Championships
Free skating	TES	67.33	2026 World Championships
Free skating	PCS	58.55	2026 Skate Canada International

==== Senior level ====
Results in the 2024–25 season
Date	Event	SP		FS		Total	
Date	Event	P	Score	P	Score	P	Score
Nov 11–17, 2024	(Germany) 2024 NRW Trophy	1	60.96	1	109.35	1	170.31
Nov 20–24, 2024	(Poland) 2024 CS Warsaw Cup	3	58.60	5	111.49	4	170.51
Dec 13–15, 2024	(Switzerland) 2025 Swiss Championships	1	54.21	1	96.55	1	150.76
Jan 28 – Feb 2, 2025	(Estonia) 2025 European Championships	13	54.62	12	102.99	13	157.61
Mar 25–30, 2025	(United States) 2025 World Championships	18	56.57	19	99.17	20	155.74

Results in the 2025–26 season
Date	Event	SP		FS		Total	
Date	Event	P	Score	P	Score	P	Score
Sep 25–27, 2025	(Germany) 2025 CS Nebelhorn Trophy	5	65.85	9	113.95	9	179.80
Oct 23–26, 2025	(Switzerland) 2025 Swiss Open	2	60.50	1	111.85	1	172.35
Oct 31 – Nov 2, 2025	2025 Skate Canada International	5	61.54	7	104.40	7	165.94
Dec 3–6, 2025	(Croatia) 2025 CS Golden Spin of Zagreb	2	64.36	4	113.25	3	177.61
Dec 19–21, 2025	(Switzerland) 2026 Swiss Championships	1	58.42	1	120.61	1	179.03
Jan 13–18, 2026	(United Kingdom) 2026 European Championships	6	62.78	5	120.53	5	183.31
Mar 24–29, 2026	(Czech Republic) 2026 World Championships	16	60.12	8	124.44	10	184.56

Results in the 2026–27 season
Date	Event	SP		FS		Total	
Date	Event	P	Score	P	Score	P	Score
Sep 24–26, 2026	(Germany) 2026 CS Nebelhorn Trophy	11	52.74	2	112.39	5	165.13
Oct 30 - Nov 1, 2026	2026 Skate Canada International	4	61.46	2	121.66	3	183.12
Nov 13-15, 2026	(United States) 2026 Skate America	3	70.63	5	112.93	4	183.56

==== Junior level ====
Results in the 2024–25 season
Date	Event	SP		FS		Total	
Date	Event	P	Score	P	Score	P	Score
Feb 25 – Mar 2, 2025	(Hungary) 2025 World Junior Championships	6	54.82	4	98.43	4	153.25
