= Oxana Vouillamoz =

Swiss pair skater (born 2004)

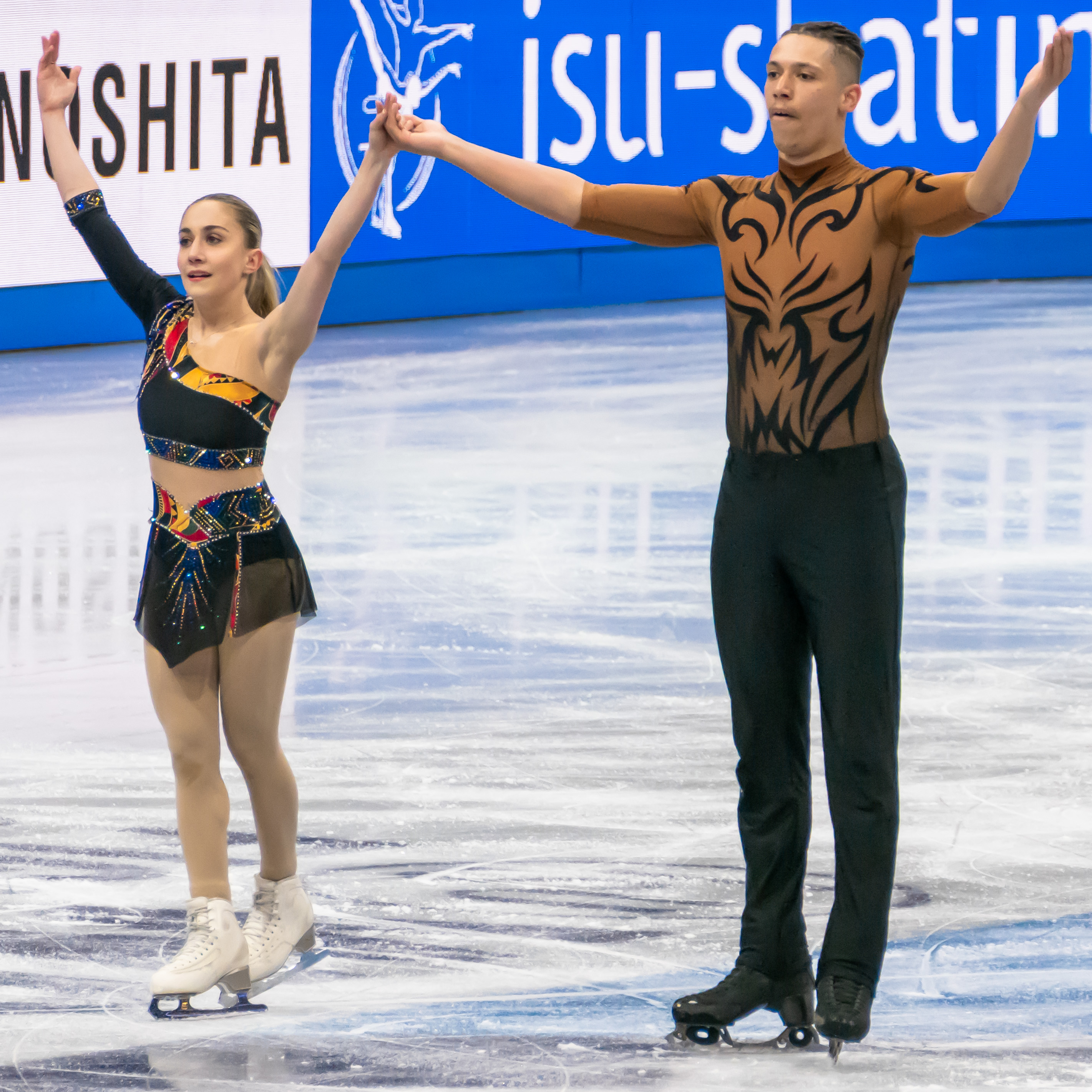
- Oxana Vouillamoz and Tom Bouvart at the 2025 World Championships

Personal information
- Born: 24 April 2004 (age 22) Sion, Switzerland
- Home town: Aproz, Switzerland
- Height: 1.50 m (4 ft 11 in)

Figure skating career
- Country: Switzerland (2019–20; since 2024); France (2021–24)
- Discipline: Pair skating (since 2021); Women's singles (2019–20)
- Partner: Tom Bouvart (since 2024); Flavien Giniaux (2021–23)
- Coach: Claude Péri; Lola Esbrat

Medal record
Representing Switzerland
Swiss Championships
Gold medal – first place	2025 Geneva	Pairs
Gold medal – first place	2026 Lugano	Pairs
Representing France
French Championships
Silver medal – second place	2023 Rouen	Pairs

Oxana Vouillamoz (born 24 April 2004) is a Swiss pair skater who currently competes with Tom Bouvart. Together, they are the two-time Swiss national champions (2025-26), the 2026 Skate Canada International bronze medalists, the 2025 CS Golden Spin of Zagreb bronze medalists, and the 2024 NRW Trophy gold medalists.

With her former partner, Flavien Giniaux, she competed for France. Together, they are two-time French junior national champions (2023-24) and placed fifth at the 2023 World Junior Championships.

== Personal life ==
Oxana Vouillamoz was born on 24 April 2004 in Sion, Switzerland, to Doris and Stéphane Vouillamoz. She studied at Collège des Creusets in Sion.

== Career ==
=== Early years ===
As a child, Vouillamoz trained in Martigny. After the 2015–16 season, she became a member of CP Sion. In April 2018, she began training in Champéry, coached by Stéphane Lambiel, Robert Dierking, and Anna Dierking.

In late 2019, Bruno Massot suggested that she take up pair skating with France's Flavien Giniaux; she agreed and joined Massot's group at the Tissot Arena in Bienne in August 2020. Vouillamoz/Giniaux trained but did not compete in their first season together.

=== Partnership with Flavien Giniaux ===
==== 2021–22 season: Debut of Vouillamox/Giniaux for France ====
By the 2021–22 season, Vouillamoz/Giniaux had relocated with Massot to Caen and had decided to skate for France. The two made their competitive debut in early September, placing tenth at the 2021–22 ISU Junior Grand Prix event in Košice, Slovakia. After winning medals at a few minor international junior events, they won the French junior national title.

In April, Vouillamoz/Giniaux finished tenth at the 2022 World Junior Championships in Tallinn, Estonia.

==== 2022–23 season: Senior international debut ====
Beginning their season on the 2022–23 ISU Junior Grand Prix circuit, Vouillamoz/Giniaux placed fifth in the Czech Republic and fourth in Poland. They made their senior international debut in October, winning bronze at the Trophée Métropole Nice Côte d'Azur. They then made their Challenger series debut, finishing eighth at the 2022 CS Warsaw Cup. Vouillamoz/Giniaux won a second consecutive French junior national title, and then took the silver medal at the senior national championships.

At their final junior event, the 2023 World Junior Championships in Calgary, Vouillamoz/Giniaux finished second in the short program, setting a new personal best and winning a silver small medal. Giniaux called the result "amazing. We've worked hard. We have a great team at Caen, with our coach, Oxana, our staff we worked together, and we enjoy every day even if it was hard sometimes." They struggled in the free skate, sixth in that segment and dropping to fifth overall, finishing 5.80 points behind bronze medalists Sierova/Khobta of Ukraine.

Vouillamoz/Giniaux made their senior World Championship debut at the 2023 edition in Saitama. They qualified to the free skate and placed fifteenth overall.

==== 2023–24 season: End of Vouillamox/Giniaux ====
Vouillamoz/Giniaux won gold at the Trophée Métropole Nice, before being invited to make their Grand Prix debut at the 2023 Grand Prix de France. They came seventh.

On December 5, Giniaux announced that Vouillamoz had ended their partnership.

=== Partnership with Tom Bouvart ===
==== 2024–25 season: Debut of Vouillamoz/Bouvart for Switzerland ====
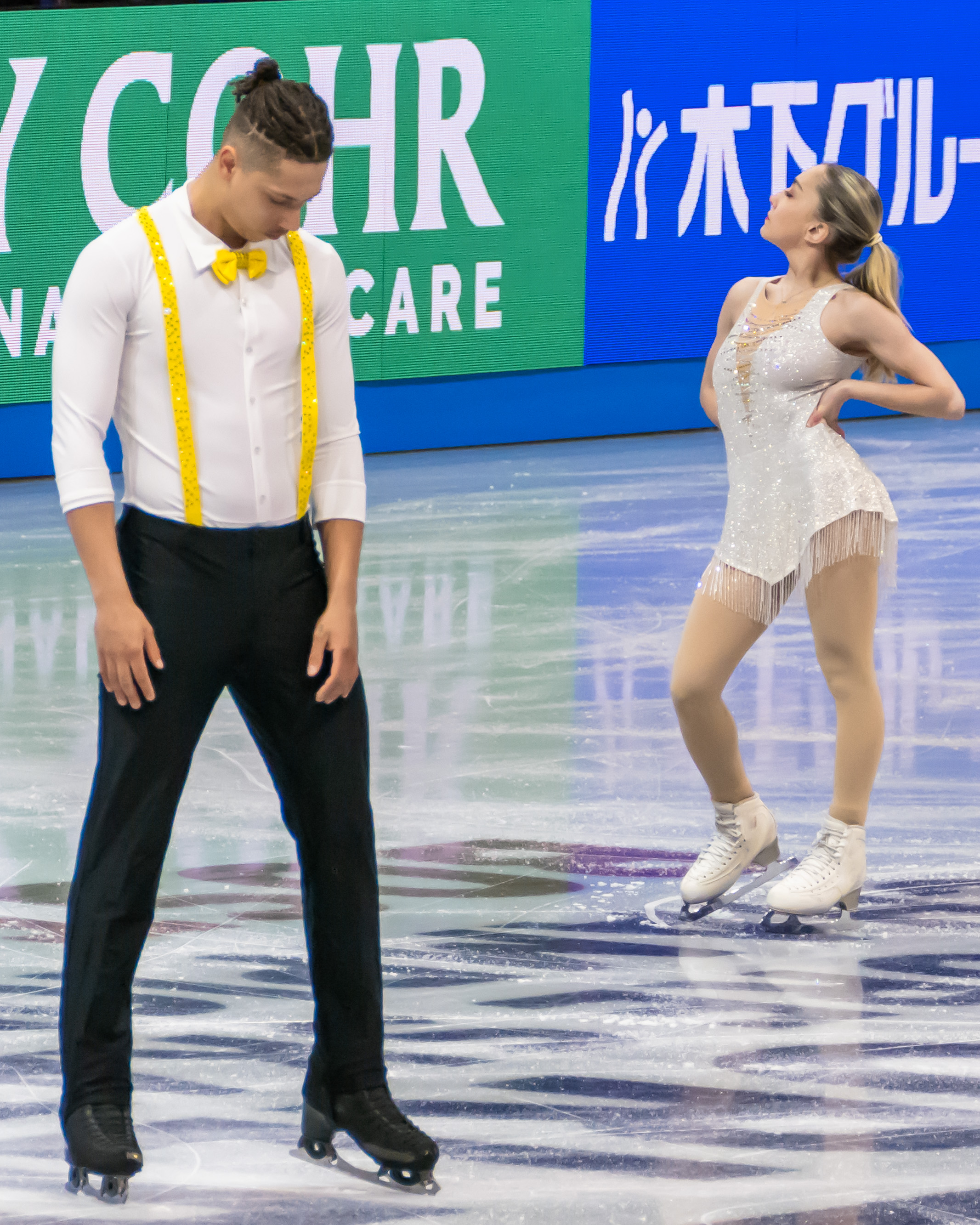
Vouillamoz and Bouvart in their starting pose for their short program at the 2025 World Championships

On April 18, 2024, Swiss Ice Skating posted a list of their senior international team for the upcoming season, listing Vouillamoz with French-born pair skater Tom Bouvart, indicating that they would be skating for Switzerland. It was subsequently announced that they would train in Paris under coaches Claude Péri and Lola Esbrat.

The pair debuted in late November at the 2024 NRW Trophy, where they won the gold medal. At the event, they earned the required minimum technical scores to compete at the World Championships. They would follow this up by finishing fourth at the 2024 CS Warsaw Cup.

In December, the pair would win gold at the 2025 Swiss Championships. The following month, Vouillamoz/Bouvart competed on the junior level at the 2025 Bavarian Open, where they won the silver medal. One week later, the pair competed at the 2025 European Championships in Tallinn, Estonia, where they placed thirteenth.

Towards the end of February, Vouillamoz/Bouvart competed at the 2025 World Junior Championships in Debrecen, Hungary. They placed sixth in the short program and fourth in the free skate, finishing in fourth place overall. The pair were less than two points off the podium. Following the event, Vouillamoz said, "We are pretty happy with this [free skate] performance. We’re still a new team, so for us, every competition is about gaining experience. Of course, we wish we could have done better, there’s always room to grow, but overall, we’re satisfied with what we did today."

Going on to compete at the 2025 World Championships in Boston, Massachusetts, United States, the pair came in twentieth place.

==== 2025–26 season ====
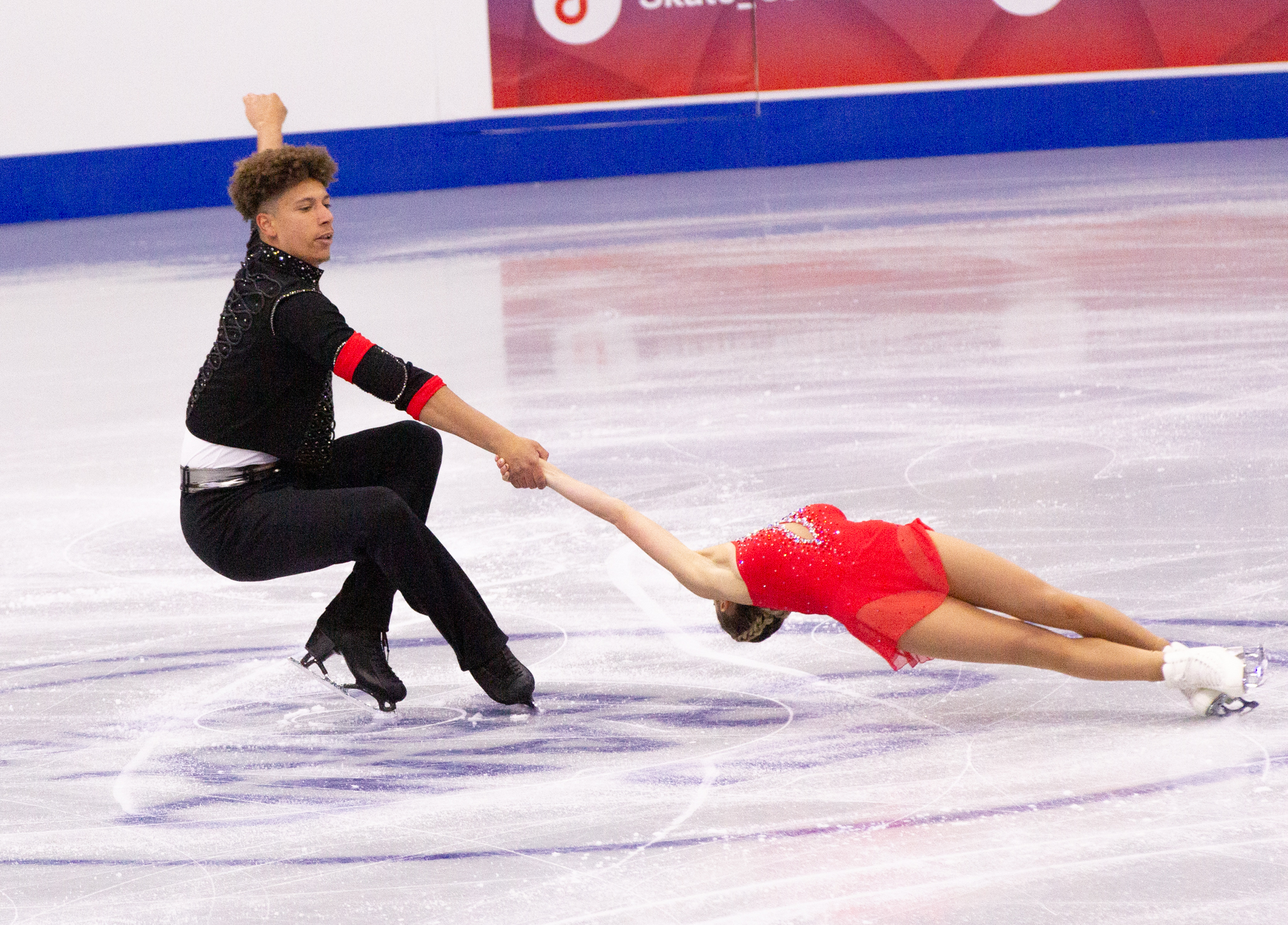
Vouillamoz and Bouvart performing a death spiral during their short program at 2025 Skate Canada International

Vouillamoz/Bouvart opened the season by finishing ninth at the 2025 CS Nebelhorn Trophy and winning gold at the 2025 Swiss Open. They then went on to make their Grand Prix debut at 2025 Skate Canada International, where they finished in seventh place.

In December, the pair won the bronze medal at the 2025 CS Golden Spin of Zagreb before winning their second national title at the 2026 Swiss Championships. The following month, Vouillamoz/Bouvart competed at the 2026 European Championships in Sheffield, England, United Kingdom, where they scored personal bests in the free skate and combined total segments, finishing in fifth place. "We are feeling really, really happy," said Bouvart following their free skate. "We did what we wanted to do and I’m really happy to do this here at the European Championships. It’s a really big motivation for the future." They went on to finish in 10th place at the 2026 World Figure Skating Championships in Prague, Czechia.

=== 2026–27 season ===
Vouillamoz/Bouvart opened their season at 2026 CS Nebelhorn Trophy in September, placing fifth. The team then went on to win the bronze medal at 2026 Skate Canada International. “I’m happy! I’m happy! I’m focused before the skate,” said Bouvart after the free skate. “I try to enjoy more. When I skate with fun, it’s easy, you know? So, I think it’s a good base for work for the future.”

== Programs ==
=== Pair skating with Tom Bouvart (for Switzerland) ===
Season	Short program	Free skating
2025–2026	Liberian Girl; Remember the Time; Smooth Criminal by Michael Jackson choreo. by Mahil Chantelauze	Clubbed to Death (Epic Version) (from The Matrix) by Rob Dougan choreo. by John Zimmerman, Silvia Fontana
2024–2025	The Mask; This Business of Love by Domino; Hey Pachuco by Royal Crown Revue choreo. by Mérovée Ephrem, Laurent Porteret	Blood Diamond; Crossing the Bridge; Village Attack; Solomon Vandy by James Newton Howard choreo. by Mérovée Ephrem, Laurent Porteret

=== Pair skating with Flavien Giniaux (for France) ===
Season	Short program	Free skating
2023–2024	Fortitude by Haevn choreo. by Karine Arribert, Pierre-Loup Bouquet	Valhalla Calling by Miracle of Sound choreo. by Karine Arribert, Pierre-Loup Bouquet
2022–2023	Inside by Chris Avantgarde, Red Rosamond arranged by Maxime Rodriguez choreo. by Bruno Massot, Pierre-Loup Bouquet	Between These Hands by Asaf Avidan arranged by Maxime Rodriguez choreo. by Bruno Massot, Pierre-Loup Bouquet
2021–2022	Men Should Never Fall In Love by Grandgeorge arranged by Maxime Rodriguez choreo. by Bruno Massot, Pierre-Loup Bouquet	Between These Hands by Asaf Avidan arranged by Maxime Rodriguez choreo. by Bruno Massot, Pierre-Loup Bouquet

== Competitive highlights ==
- GP – Event of the ISU Grand Prix Series
- JGP – Event of the ISU Junior Grand Prix Series
- CS – Event of the ISU Challenger Series
- TBD – Assigned
- WD – Withdrew from competition

=== Pair skating with Tom Bouvart (for Switzerland) ===
Competition placements at senior level
Season	2024–25	2025–26	2026–27
World Championships	20th	10th	
European Championships	13th	5th	
Swiss Championships	1st	1st	
GP Skate America			4th
GP Skate Canada		7th	3rd
CS Golden Spin of Zagreb		3rd	
CS Nebelhorn Trophy		9th	5th
CS Warsaw Cup	4th		
NRW Trophy	1st		
Swiss Open		1st	

Competition placements at junior level
Season	2024–25
World Junior Championships	4th
Bavarian Open	2nd

=== Pair skating with Flavien Giniaux (for France) ===
Competition placements at senior level
Season	2022–23	2023–24
World Championships	15th	
French Championships	2nd	
GP France		7th
CS Nebelhorn Trophy		WD
CS Warsaw Cup	8th	
Master's de Patinage		3rd
Trophée Métropole Nice	3rd	1st

Competition placements at junior level
Season	2022–23	2023–24
World Junior Championships	10th	5th
French Championships	1st	1st
JGP Czech Republic		5th
JGP Poland		4th
JGP Slovakia	10th	
Ice Challenge	1st	
Master's de Patinage	1st	1st
Trophée Métropole Nice	1st	
Winter Star	3rd	

=== Single skating (for Switzerland) ===
Competition placements at junior level
Season	2019–20
Swiss Championships	17th

== Detailed results ==
=== Pair skating with Tom Bouvart (for Switzerland) ===
ISU personal best scores in the +5/-5 GOE System
Segment	Type	Score	Event
Total	TSS	184.56	2026 World Championships
Short program	TSS	70.63	2026 Skate America
Short program	TES	40.94	2026 Skate America
Short program	PCS	29.69	2026 Skate America
Free skating	TSS	124.44	2026 World Championships
Free skating	TES	67.33	2026 World Championships
Free skating	PCS	58.55	2026 Skate Canada International

==== Senior level ====
Results in the 2024–25 season
Date	Event	SP		FS		Total	
Date	Event	P	Score	P	Score	P	Score
Nov 11–17, 2024	(Germany) 2024 NRW Trophy	1	60.96	1	109.35	1	170.31
Nov 20–24, 2024	(Poland) 2024 CS Warsaw Cup	3	58.60	5	111.49	4	170.51
Dec 13–15, 2024	(Switzerland) 2025 Swiss Championships	1	54.21	1	96.55	1	150.76
Jan 28 – Feb 2, 2025	(Estonia) 2025 European Championships	13	54.62	12	102.99	13	157.61
Mar 25–30, 2025	(United States) 2025 World Championships	18	56.57	19	99.17	20	155.74

Results in the 2025–26 season
Date	Event	SP		FS		Total	
Date	Event	P	Score	P	Score	P	Score
Sep 25–27, 2025	(Germany) 2025 CS Nebelhorn Trophy	5	65.85	9	113.95	9	179.80
Oct 23–26, 2025	(Switzerland) 2025 Swiss Open	2	60.50	1	111.85	1	172.35
Oct 31 – Nov 2, 2025	2025 Skate Canada International	5	61.54	7	104.40	7	165.94
Dec 3–6, 2025	(Croatia) 2025 CS Golden Spin of Zagreb	2	64.36	4	113.25	3	177.61
Dec 19–21, 2025	(Switzerland) 2026 Swiss Championships	1	58.42	1	120.61	1	179.03
Jan 13–18, 2026	(United Kingdom) 2026 European Championships	6	62.78	5	120.53	5	183.31
Mar 24–29, 2026	(Czech Republic) 2026 World Championships	16	60.12	8	124.44	10	184.56

Results in the 2026–27 season
Date	Event	SP		FS		Total	
Date	Event	P	Score	P	Score	P	Score
Sep 24–26, 2026	(Germany) 2026 CS Nebelhorn Trophy	11	52.74	2	112.39	5	165.13
Oct 30 - Nov 1, 2026	2026 Skate Canada International	4	61.46	2	121.66	3	183.12
Nov 13–15, 2026	(United States) 2026 Skate America	3	70.63	5	112.93	4	183.56

==== Junior level ====
Results in the 2024–25 season
Date	Event	SP		FS		Total	
Date	Event	P	Score	P	Score	P	Score
Feb 25 – Mar 2, 2025	(Hungary) 2025 World Junior Championships	6	54.82	4	98.43	4	153.25
