= 2026 Skate Canada International =

Figure skating competition

- Type: Grand Prix
- Date: 29 October – 1 November
- Season: 2026–27
- Location: Kelowna, British Columbia, Canada
- Host: Skate Canada
- Venue: Prospera Place

Champions
- Men's singles: (France) Kévin Aymoz
- Women's singles: (Japan) Mao Shimada
- Pairs: (Canada) Lia Pereira and Trennt Michaud
- Ice dance: (United Kingdom) Lilah Fear and Lewis Gibson
- Previous: 2025 Skate Canada International
- Next: 2027 Skate Canada International
- Previous Grand Prix: 2026 Grand Prix de France
- Next Grand Prix: 2026 Cup of China

The 2026 Skate Canada International is a figure skating competition sanctioned by the International Skating Union (ISU). Organized and hosted by Skate Canada, it is the second event of the 2026–27 ISU Grand Prix of Figure Skating: a senior-level international invitational competition series. It will be held from 29 October to 1 November at the Prospera Place in Kelowna, British Columbia. Medals will be awarded in men's singles, women's singles, pair skating, and ice dance. Skaters will also earn points based on their results, and the top skaters or teams in each discipline at the end of the season will then be invited to compete at the 2026–27 Grand Prix Final in Chongqing, China. Skaters can earn points towards the World Standings and Season's World Ranking based on their results.

Kévin Aymoz of France won the men's event, Mao Shimada of Japan won the women's event, Lia Pereira and Trennt Michaud of Canada won the pairs event, and Lilah Fear and Lewis Gibson of Great Britain won the ice dance event.

== Background ==
The ISU Grand Prix of Figure Skating is a series of seven events sanctioned by the International Skating Union (ISU) and held during the autumn: six qualifying events and the Grand Prix of Figure Skating Final. This allows skaters to perfect their programs earlier in the season, as well as compete against the skaters whom they would later encounter at the World Championships. Skaters earn points based on their results in their respective competitions and after the six qualifying events, the top skaters or teams in each discipline are invited to compete at the Grand Prix Final. Skate Canada International debuted in 1973, and when the ISU launched the Grand Prix series in 1995, Skate Canada International was one of the five qualifying events. It has been a Grand Prix event every year since, except for 2020, when it was cancelled due to the COVID-19 pandemic.

The 2026 Skate Canada International is the second event of the 2026–27 Grand Prix of Figure Skating series, and will be held from 29 October to 1 November at the Prospera Place in Kelowna, British Columbia.

== Entries ==
The International Skating Union published the initial list of entrants on 16 June 2026.

Country	Men	Women	Pairs	Ice dance
Canada	Wesley Chiu	Fée Ann Landry	Ava Kemp; Yohnatan Elizarov	Marie-Jade Lauriault; Romain Le Gac
Canada	Stephen Gogolev	Madeline Schizas	Lia Pereira; Trennt Michaud	Layla Veillon; Alexander Brandys
Canada	David Bondar	Sara-Maude Dupuis	Miyu Yunoki; Tristan Taylor	Alyssa Robinson; Jacob Portz
Czech Republic	Georgii Reshtenko	—N/a	Anna Valesi; Martin Bidař	—N/a
Estonia	Mihhail Selevko	Niina Petrõkina	—N/a	
France	Kévin Aymoz	—N/a		Evgeniia Lopareva; Geoffrey Brissaud
Germany	Genrikh Gartung	—N/a		
Great Britain	—N/a			Lilah Fear; Lewis Gibson
Italy	—N/a	Anna Pezzetta	Irma Caldara; Riccardo Maglio	Noemi Maria Tali; Noah Lafornara
Japan	Rio Nakata	Saki Miyake	—N/a	
Japan	Kazuki Tomono	Mao Shimada	—N/a	
Kazakhstan	—N/a	Sofia Samodelkina	—N/a	
South Korea	Kim Hyun-gyeom	Kim Yu-jae	—N/a	
South Korea	—N/a	Shin Ji-a	—N/a	
Switzerland	—N/a		Oxana Vouillamoz; Tom Bouvart	—N/a
Ukraine	Kyrylo Marsak	—N/a	Sofiia Holichenko; Artem Darenskyi	Iryna Pidgaina; Artem Koval
United States	Liam Kapeikis	Isabeau Levito	Alisa Efimova; Misha Mitrofanov	Oona Brown; Gage Brown
United States	—N/a			Caroline Green; Michael Parsons
United States	—N/a			Katarina Wolfkostin; Dimitry Tsarevski
(Individual Neutral Athletes) Individual Neutral Athlete	—N/a	Viktoriia Safonova	—N/a	

== Changes to preliminary assignments ==
Discipline	Withdrew		Added		Notes	Ref.
Discipline	Date	Skater(s)	Date	Skater(s)	Notes	Ref.
Men	2 September	(Italy); Matteo Rizzo	9 September	(Czech Republic); Georgii Reshtenko	Not competing in Grand Prix Series	
Men	—N/a		15 September	(Canada); David Bondar	Host picks	
Women	—N/a		15 September	(Canada); Sara-Maude Dupuis	Host picks	
Pairs	—N/a		15 September	(Canada); Miyu Yunoki; Tristan Taylor	Host picks	
Ice dance	—N/a		15 September	(Canada); Alyssa Robinson; Jacob Portz	Host picks	
Men	21 October	(United States); Andrew Torgashev	22 October	(Germany); Genrikh Gartung	Not competing in Grand Prix Series	
Women	21 October	(Finland); Iida Karhunen	22 October	(Individual Neutral Athletes); Viktoriia Safonova	Injury	
Ice dance	26 October	(Czech Republic); Kateřina Mrázková; Daniel Mrázek	26 October	(Italy); Noemi Maria Tali; Noah Lafornara		

== Required performance elements ==
=== Single skating ===
Lasting no more than 2 minutes 40 seconds, the short program has to include the following elements:

For men: one double or triple Axel; one triple or quadruple jump; one jump combination consisting of a double jump and a triple jump, two triple jumps, or a quadruple jump and a double jump or triple jump; one flying spin; one camel spin or sit spin with a change of foot; one spin combination with a change of foot; and one step sequence using the full ice surface.

For women: one double or triple Axel; one triple jump; one jump combination consisting of a double jump and a triple jump, or two triple jumps; one flying spin; one layback spin, sideways leaning spin, camel spin, or sit spin without a change of foot; one spin combination with a change of foot; and one step sequence using the full ice surface.

The free skate can last no more than 4 minutes, and has to include the following: six jump elements, of which one has to be an Axel-type jump; three spins, of which one has to be a spin combination, one a flying spin, and one a choreographic spin; one step sequence; and a choreographic sequence.

=== Pair skating ===
Lasting no more than 2 minutes 40 seconds, the short program has to include the following elements: one group 3 pair lift, one double or triple twist lift, one double or triple throw jump, one double or triple solo jump, one pair spin combination, one forward inside death spiral, and one step sequence using the full ice surface.

The free skate could last no more than 4 minutes, and has to include the following: two pair lifts (from different lift groups), one twist lift, two different throw jumps, one solo jump, one jump combination or sequence, one choreographic pair lift, one choreographic pair spin, and one death spiral (different type from the one done in the short program).

=== Ice dance ===
Lasting no more than 2 minutes 50 seconds, the theme of the rhythm dance this season is "Rhythm and Waltz". The rhythm dance has to include the following elements: one section of the Golden Waltz pattern dance, one creative dance element, one dance lift, one set of sequential twizzles, and one step sequence while not touching.

The free dance can last no longer than 4 minutes, and has to include the following: three dance lifts or one short lift and one combination lift; one dance spin; one step sequence in hold; one set of synchronized twizzles, one one-foot turns sequence in hold, and two choreographic elements.

== Judging ==
Skaters are judged according to the required technical elements of their program (such as jumps and spins), as well as the overall presentation of their program, based on three program components (skating skills, presentation, and composition). Each technical element in a figure skating performance is assigned a predetermined base point value and scored by a panel of nine judges on a scale from −5 to +5 based on the quality of its execution. Each Grade of Execution (GOE) from –5 to +5 is assigned a value as indicated on the Scale of Values. For example, a triple Axel is worth a base value of 8.00 points, and a GOE of +3 is worth 2.40 points, so a triple Axel with a GOE of +3 earns 10.40 points. The judging panel's GOE for each element is determined by calculating the trimmed mean (the average after discarding the highest and lowest scores). The panel's scores for all elements are added together to generate a Total Elements Score. At the same time, the judges evaluate each performance based on the five aforementioned program components and assign each a score from 0.25 to 10 in 0.25-point increments. The judging panel's final score for each program component is also determined by calculating the trimmed mean. Those scores are then multiplied by the factor shown on the chart below; the results are added together to generate a total Program Component Score.

Program component factoring
Discipline	Short program or rhythm dance	Free skate or free dance
Men	1.67	3.33
Women	1.33	2.67
Pairs	1.33	2.67
Ice dance	1.33	2.00

Deductions are applied for certain violations, such as time infractions, stops and restarts, or falls. The Total Elements Score and Program Component Score are then added together, minus any deductions, to generate a final performance score for each skater or team.

== Medalists ==
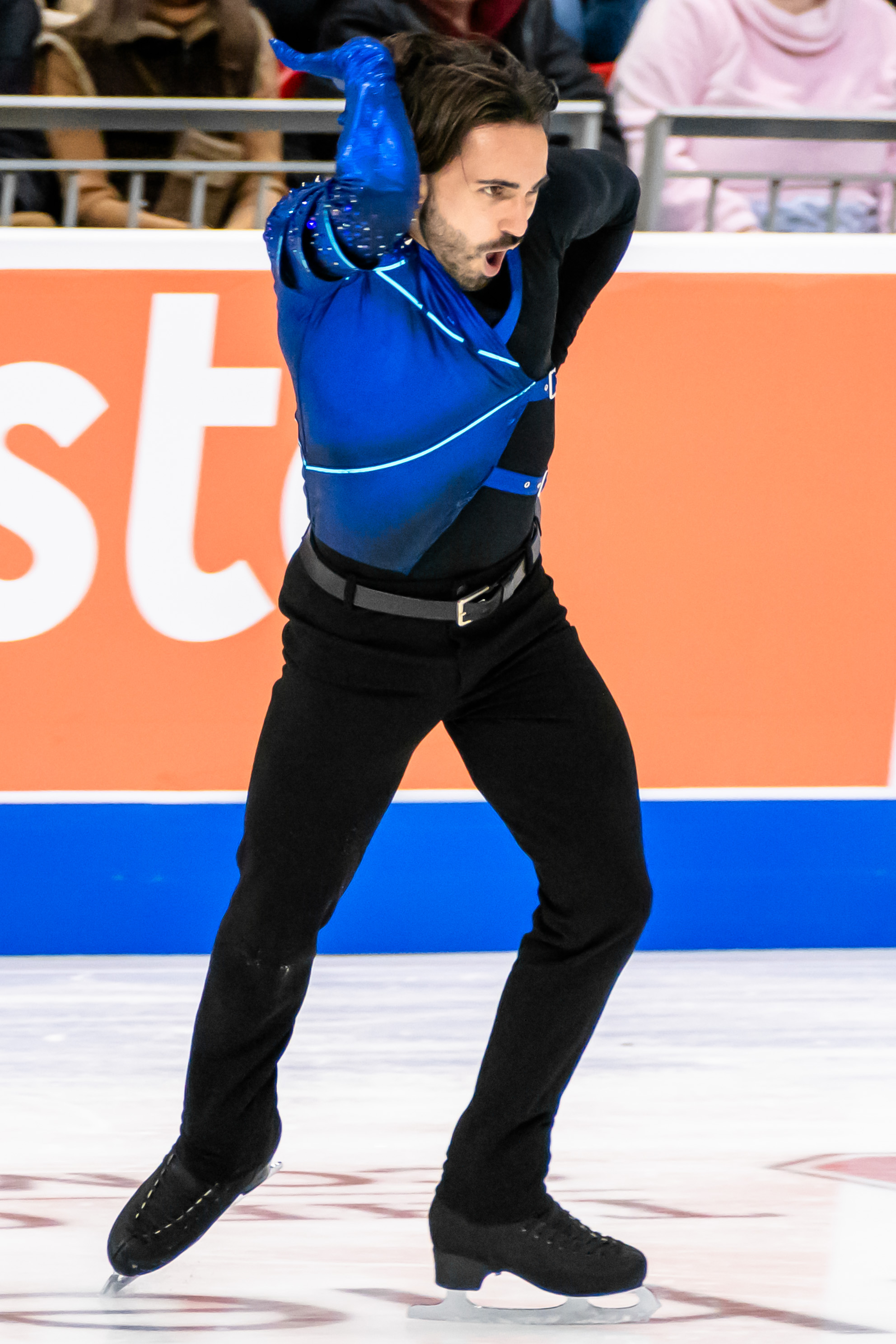
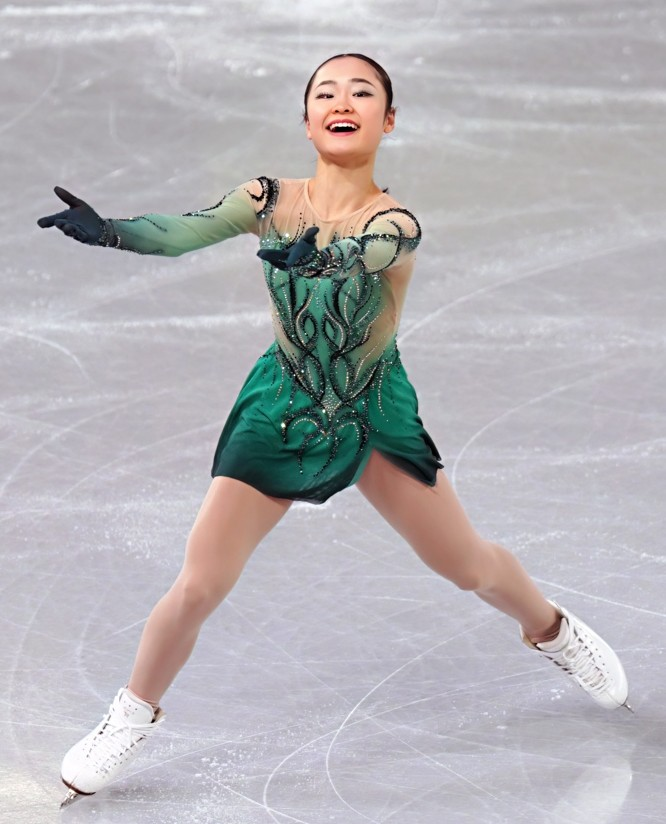
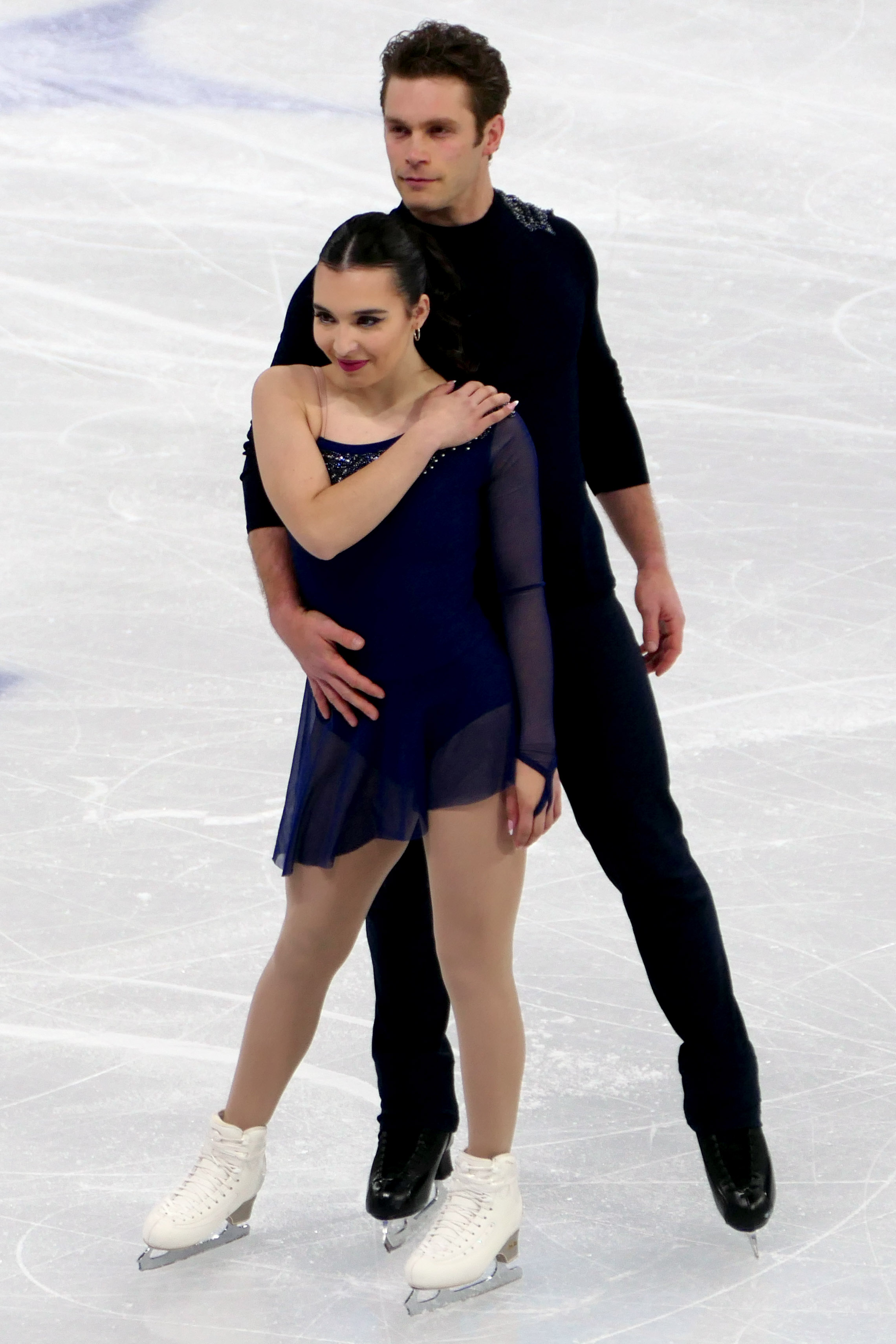
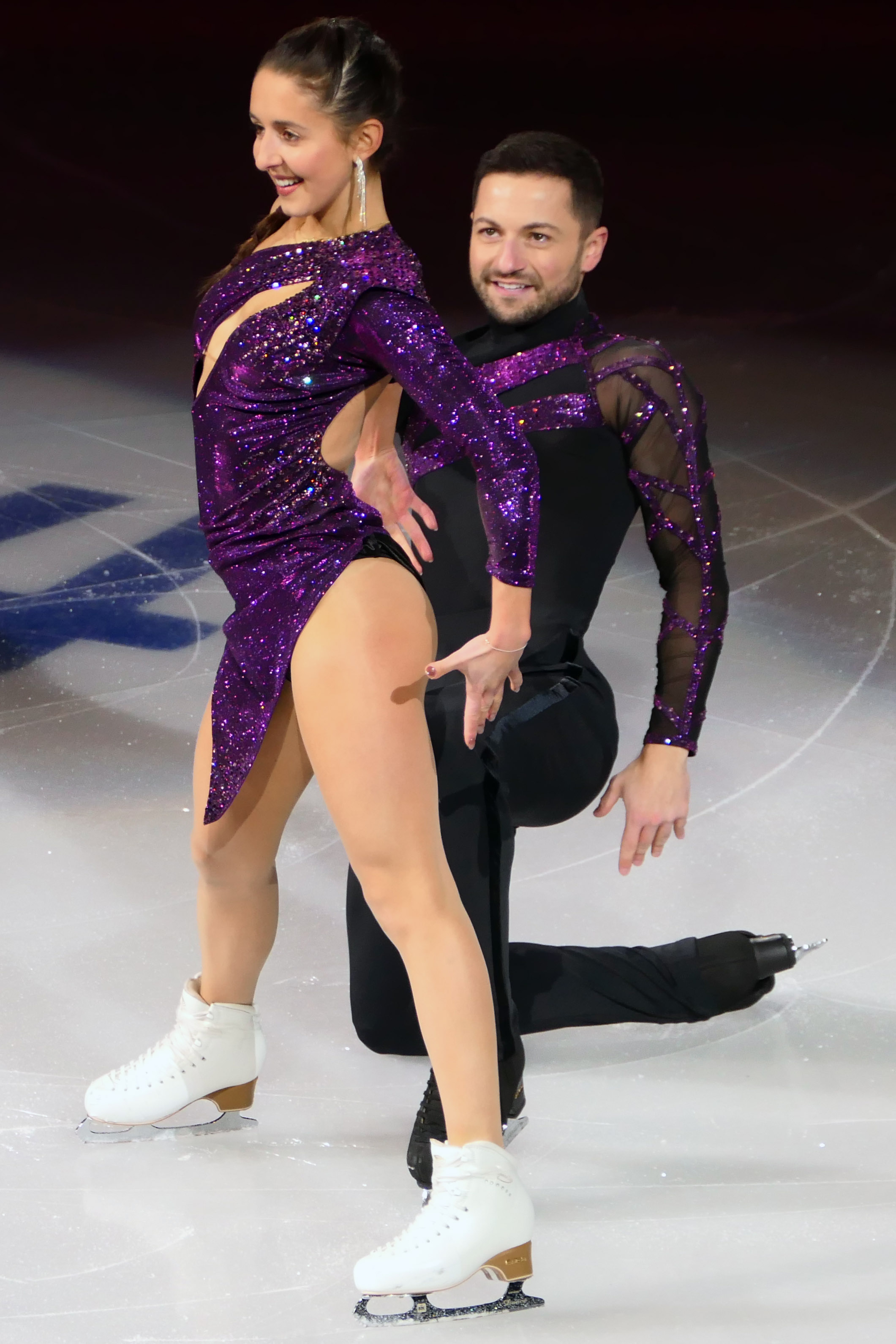
The 2026 Skate Canada International champions (from left to right): Kévin Aymoz of France (men's singles); Mao Shimada of Japan (women's singles); Lia Pereira and Trennt Michaud of Canada (pair skating); and Lilah Fear and Lewis Gibson of Great Britain (ice dance)

Medalists
Discipline	Gold	Silver	Bronze
Men	(France); Kévin Aymoz	(Japan); Rio Nakata	(Estonia); Mihhail Selevko
Women	(Japan); Mao Shimada	(Estonia); Niina Petrõkina	(United States); Isabeau Levito
Pairs	(Canada); Lia Pereira; Trennt Michaud	(United States); Alisa Efimova; Misha Mitrofanov	(Switzerland); Oxana Vouillamoz; Tom Bouvart
Ice dance	(United Kingdom); Lilah Fear; Lewis Gibson	(France); Evgeniia Lopareva; Geoffrey Brissaud	(United States); Caroline Green; Michael Parsons

== Results ==
=== Men’s Singles ===
Men’s results
Rank	Skater	Nation	Total points	SP		FS	
1st place, gold medalist(s)	Kevin Aymoz	France	258.43	2	90.26	2	168.17
2nd place, silver medalist(s)	Rio Nakata	Japan	249.25	1	92.64	4	156.61
3rd place, bronze medalist(s)	Mihhail Selevko	Estonia	248.66	5	79.58	1	169.08
4	Stephen Gogolev	Canada	232.72	12	66.73	3	165.99
5	Kyrylo Marsak	Ukraine	226.40	4	83.67	6	142.73
6	Kazuki Tomono	Japan	222.85	3	85.31	8	137.54
7	Georgii Reshtenko	Czech Republic	216.94	8	76.43	7	140.51
8	Genrikh Gartung	Germany	216.47	11	67.44	5	149.03
9	David Bondar	Canada	214.61	7	77.48	9	137.13
10	Wesley Chiu	Canada	200.94	9	73.87	10	127.07
11	Kim Hyun-gyeom	South Korea	199.19	6	77.76	11	121.43
12	Liam Kapeikis	United States	189.01	10	70.07	12	118.94

=== Women’s Singles ===
Women's results
Rank	Skater	Nation	Total points	SP		FS	
1st place, gold medalist(s)	Mao Shimada	Japan	235.44	1	82.11	1	153.33
2nd place, silver medalist(s)	Niina Petrõkina	Estonia	221.07	3	77.24	2	143.83
3rd place, bronze medalist(s)	Isabeau Levito	United States	212.22	2	78.50	6	133.72
4	Saki Miyake	Japan	210.09	4	71.95	4	138.14
5	Sofia Samodelkina	Kazakhstan	206.89	5	71.84	5	135.05
6	Shin Ji-a	South Korea	204.52	6	65.38	3	139.14
7	Kim Yu-jae	South Korea	181.63	8	63.50	8	118.13
8	Madeline Schizas	Canada	177.38	9	57.95	7	119.43
9	Fée Ann Landry	Canada	171.18	10	57.27	9	113.91
10	Viktoriia Safonova	Individual Neutral Athletes	162.47	11	56.89	10	105.58
11	Sara-Maude Dupuis	Canada	158.63	7	64.58	12	94.05
12	Anna Pezzetta	Italy	152.80	12	54.84	11	97.96

=== Pairs ===
Pairs results
Rank	Skater	Nation	Total points	SP		FS	
1st place, gold medalist(s)	Lia Pereira; Trennt Michaud	Canada	202.17	1	77.06	1	125.11
2nd place, silver medalist(s)	Alisa Efimova; Misha Mitrofanov	United States	191.90	2	70.32	3	121.58
3rd place, bronze medalist(s)	Oxana Vouillamoz; Tom Bouvart	Switzerland	183.12	4	61.46	2	121.66
4	Anna Valesi; Martin Bidar	Czech Republic	166.66	5	60.44	4	106.22
5	Ava Kemp; Yohnatan Elizarov	Canada	163.07	3	64.94	6	98.13
6	Sofiia Holichenko; Artem Darenskyi	Ukraine	160.73	6	58.34	5	102.39
7	Miyu Yunoki; Tristan Taylor	Canada	152.41	8	55.78	7	96.63
8	Irma Caldara; Riccardo Maglio	Italy	146.57	7	58.10	8	88.47

=== Ice Dance ===
Ice dance results
Rank	Skater	Nation	Total points	RD		FD	
1st place, gold medalist(s)	Lilah Fear; Lewis Gibson	Great Britain	201.17	1	81.37	1	119.80
2nd place, silver medalist(s)	Evgeniia Lopareva; Geoffrey Brissaud	France	192.95	2	77.90	2	115.05
3rd place, bronze medalist(s)	Caroline Green; Michael Parsons	United States	186.02	3	74.24	3	111.78
4	Oona Brown; Gage Brown	United States	183.72	4	72.69	4	111.03
5	Marie-Jade Lauriault; Romain Le Gac	Canada	179.80	5	72.10	5	107.70
6	Katarina Wolfkostin; Dimitry Tsarevski	United States	175.64	6	71.40	6	104.24
7	Noemi Maria Tali; Noah Lafornara	Italy	158.37	8	62.79	7	95.58
8	Iryna Pidgaina; Artem Koval	Ukraine	158.24	7	64.89	8	93.35
9	Layla Veillon; Alexander Brandys	Canada	150.62	10	59.72	9	90.90
10	Alyssa Robinson; Jacob Portz	Canada	150.05	9	60.22	10	89.83

== Works cited ==
- "Sports Rules – Single & Pair Skating and Ice Dance" (PDF). International Skating Union. Archived (PDF) from the original on 24 May 2026.
