= 2025 Skate Canada International =

International figure skating competition

- Type: Grand Prix
- Date: 31 October – 2 November
- Season: 2025–26
- Location: Saskatoon, Saskatchewan, Canada
- Host: Skate Canada
- Venue: SaskTel Centre

Champions
- Men's singles: (United States) Ilia Malinin
- Women's singles: (Japan) Mone Chiba
- Pairs: (Canada) Deanna Stellato-Dudek and Maxime Deschamps
- Ice dance: (Canada) Piper Gilles and Paul Poirier
- Previous: 2024 Skate Canada International
- Next: 2026 Skate Canada International
- Previous Grand Prix: 2025 Cup of China
- Next Grand Prix: 2025 NHK Trophy

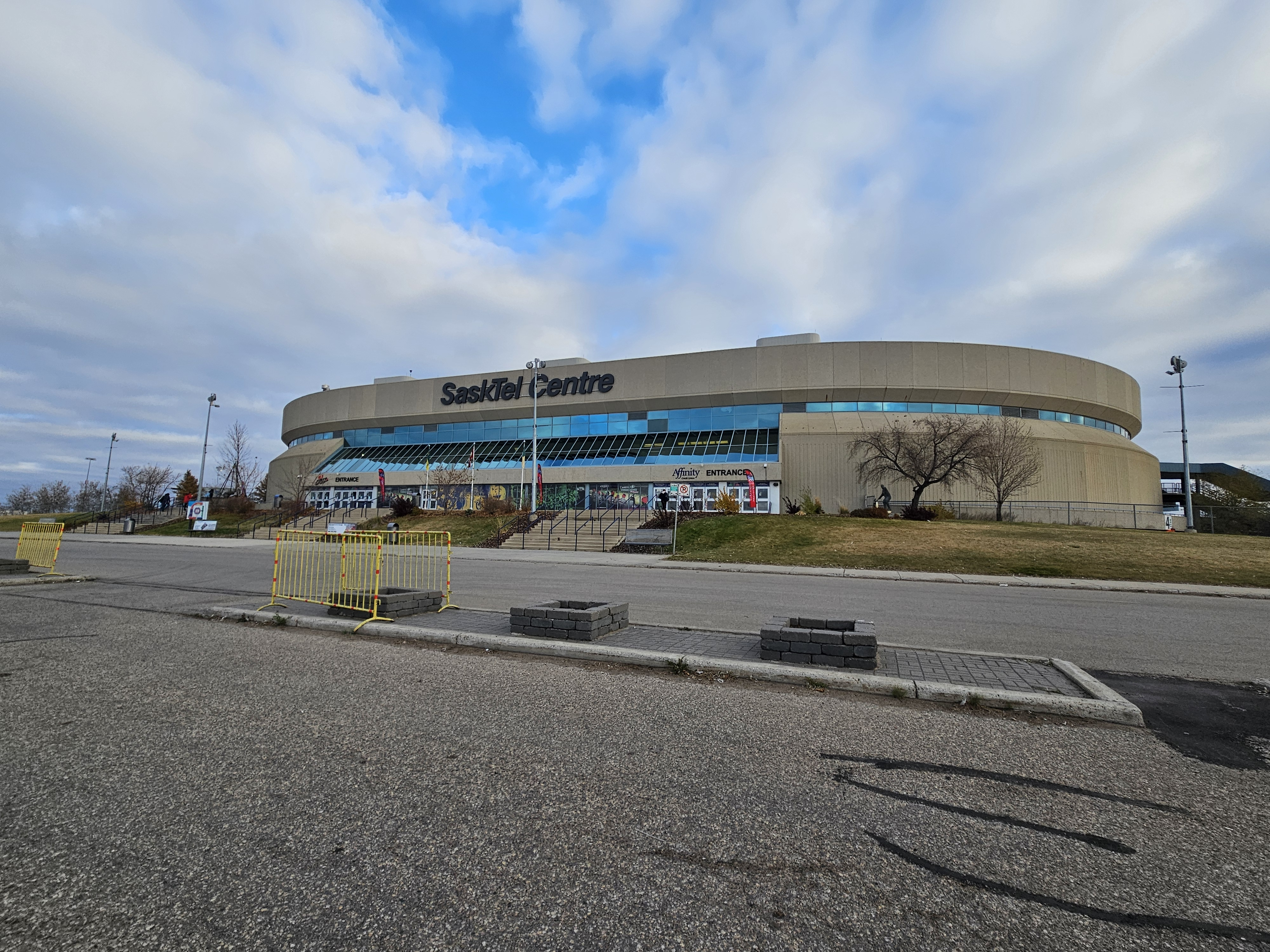
The 2025 Skate Canada International took place at the SaskTel Centre in Saskatoon, Saskatchewan.

The 2025 Skate Canada International is a figure skating competition sanctioned by the International Skating Union (ISU). Organized and hosted by Skate Canada, it was the third event of the 2025–26 Grand Prix of Figure Skating: a senior-level international invitational competition series. It was held from 31 October to 2 November at the SaskTel Centre in Saskatoon, Saskatchewan. Medals were awarded in men's singles, women's singles, pair skating, and ice dance. Skaters earned points based on their results, and the top skaters or teams in each discipline at the end of the season were then invited to compete at the 2025–26 Grand Prix Final in Nagoya, Japan. Ilia Malinin of the United States won the men's event, Mone Chiba of Japan won the women's event, Deanna Stellato-Dudek and Maxime Deschamps of Canada won the pairs event, and Piper Gilles and Paul Poirier of Canada won the ice dance event.

== Background ==
The ISU Grand Prix of Figure Skating is a series of seven events sanctioned by the International Skating Union (ISU) and held during the autumn: six qualifying events and the Grand Prix of Figure Skating Final. This allows skaters to perfect their programs earlier in the season, as well as compete against the skaters whom they would later encounter at the World Championships. Skaters earn points based on their results at the six qualifying events, after which the top skaters or teams in each discipline are invited to compete at the Grand Prix Final. Skate Canada International debuted in 1973, and when the ISU launched the Grand Prix series in 1995, Skate Canada International was one of the five qualifying events. It has been a Grand Prix event every year since, except for 2020, when it was cancelled due to the COVID-19 pandemic. The 2025 Skate Canada International was the third event of the 2025–26 Grand Prix of Figure Skating series, and was held from 31 October to 2 November at the SaskTel Centre in Saskatoon, Saskatchewan.

== Changes to preliminary assignments ==
The International Skating Union published the initial list of entrants on 6 June 2025.

Discipline	Withdrew		Added		Notes	Ref.
Discipline	Date	Skater(s)	Date	Skater(s)	Notes	Ref.
Men	10 September	(United States); Lucas Broussard	21 September	(United States); Tomoki Hiwatashi	—N/a	
Women	—N/a		15 September	(Canada); Uliana Shiryaeva	Host picks	
Ice dance	—N/a		15 September	(Canada); Marie-Jade Lauriault; Romain Le Gac	Host picks	
Pairs	6 October	(Australia); Anastasia Golubeva; Hektor Giotopoulos Moore	7 October	(Poland); Ioulia Chtchetinina; Michał Woźniak	—N/a	
Women	16 October	(Belgium); Nina Pinzarrone	28 October	(Israel); Mariia Seniuk	Injury (Pinzarrone)	
Ice dance	23 October	(Finland); Juulia Turkkila; Matthias Versluis	27 October	(South Korea); Hannah Lim; Ye Quan	Injury (Versluis)	

== Required performance elements ==
=== Single skating ===
Women competing in single skating performed their short programs on 31 October, while men performed theirs on 1 November. Lasting 2 minutes 40 seconds (+/− 10 seconds), the short program had to include the following elements:

For men: one double or triple Axel; one triple or quadruple jump; one jump combination consisting of a double jump and a triple jump, two triple jumps, or a quadruple jump and a double jump or triple jump; one flying spin; one camel spin or sit spin with a change of foot; one spin combination with a change of foot; and a step sequence using the full ice surface.

For women: one double or triple Axel; one triple jump; one jump combination consisting of a double jump and a triple jump, or two triple jumps; one flying spin; one layback spin, sideways leaning spin, camel spin, or sit spin without a change of foot; one spin combination with a change of foot; and one step sequence using the full ice surface.

Women performed their free skates on 1 November, while men performed theirs on 2 November. Lasting 4 minutes (+/− 10 seconds), the free skate for both men and women had to include the following: seven jump elements, of which one had to be an Axel-type jump; three spins, of which one had to be a spin combination, one a flying spin, and one a spin with only one position; a step sequence; and a choreographic sequence.

=== Pairs ===
Couples competing in pair skating performed their short programs on 31 October. Lasting 2 minutes 40 seconds (+/− 10 seconds), the short program had to include the following elements: one pair lift, one double or triple twist lift, one double or triple throw jump, one double or triple solo jump, one solo spin combination with a change of foot, one death spiral, and a step sequence using the full ice surface.

Couples performed their free skates on 1 November. Lasting 4 minutes (+/− 10 seconds), the free skate had to include the following: three pair lifts, of which one has to be a twist lift; two different throw jumps; one solo jump; one jump combination or sequence; one pair spin combination; one death spiral; and a choreographic sequence.

=== Ice dance ===
Couples competing in ice dance performed their rhythm dances on 1 November. Lasting 2 minutes 50 seconds (+/− 10 seconds), the theme of the rhythm dance this season was "music, dance styles, and feeling of the 1990s". Examples of applicable dance styles and music included pop, Latin, house, techno, hip-hop, and grunge. The rhythm dance had to include the following elements: one pattern dance step sequence, one choreographic rhythm sequence, one dance lift, one set of sequential twizzles, and one step sequence.

Couples then performed their free dances on 2 November. Lasting 4 minutes (+/− 10 seconds), the free dance had to include the following: three dance lifts or one short lift and one combination lift; one dance spin; one set of synchronized twizzles; one step sequence in hold; one step sequence while on one skate and not in hold, and three choreographic elements.

== Judging ==
Skaters were judged according to the required technical elements of their program (such as jumps and spins), as well as the overall presentation of their program, based on three program components (skating skills, presentation, and composition). Each technical element in a figure skating performance was assigned a predetermined base point value and scored by a panel of nine judges on a scale from −5 to +5 based on the quality of its execution. Each Grade of Execution (GOE) from –5 to +5 was assigned a value as indicated on the Scale of Values. For example, a triple Axel was worth a base value of 8.00 points, and a GOE of +3 was worth 2.40 points, so a triple Axel with a GOE of +3 earned 10.40 points. The judging panel's GOE for each element was determined by calculating the trimmed mean (the average after discarding the highest and lowest scores). The panel's scores for all elements were added together to generate a Total Elements Score. At the same time, the judges evaluated each performance based on the five aforementioned program components and assigned each a score from 0.25 to 10 in 0.25-point increments. The judging panel's final score for each program component was also determined by calculating the trimmed mean. Those scores were then multiplied by the factor shown on the chart below; the results were added together to generate a total Program Component Score.

Program component factoring
Discipline	Short program or Rhythm dance	Free skate or Free dance
Men	1.67	3.33
Women	1.33	2.67
Pairs	1.33	2.67
Ice dance	1.33	2.00

Deductions were applied for certain violations, such as time infractions, stops and restarts, or falls. The Total Elements Score and Program Component Score were then added together, minus any deductions, to generate a final performance score for each skater or team.

== Medal summary ==
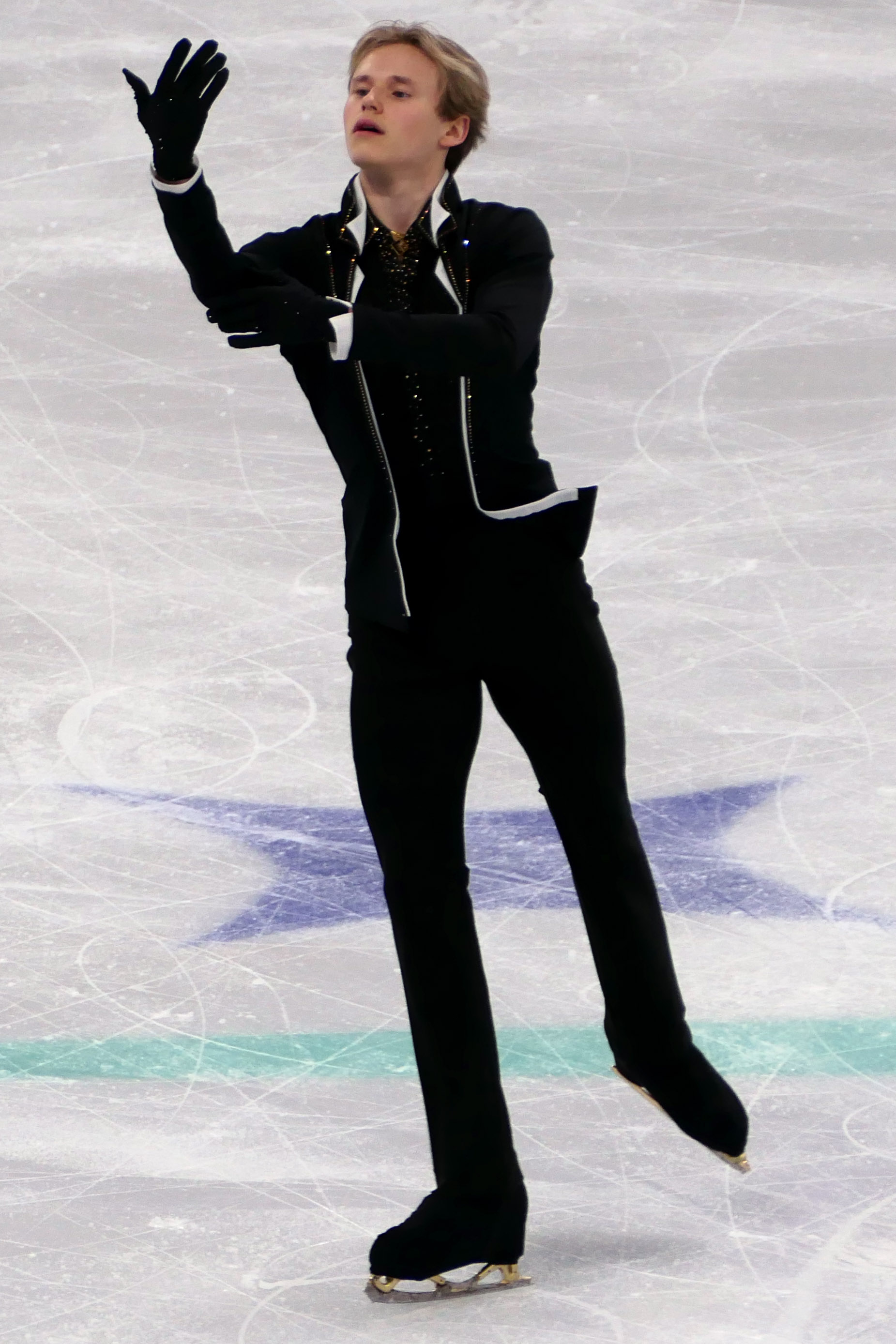
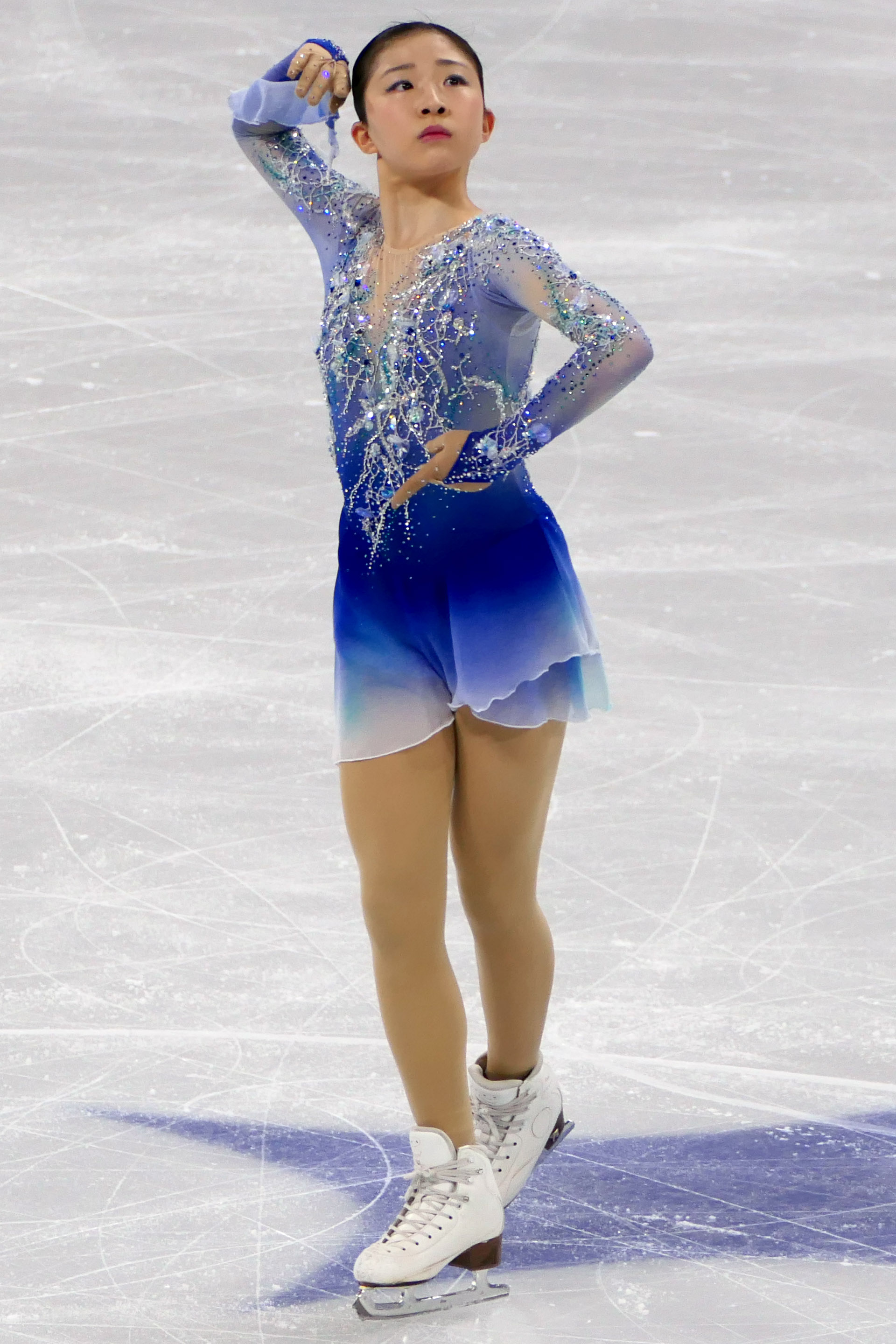
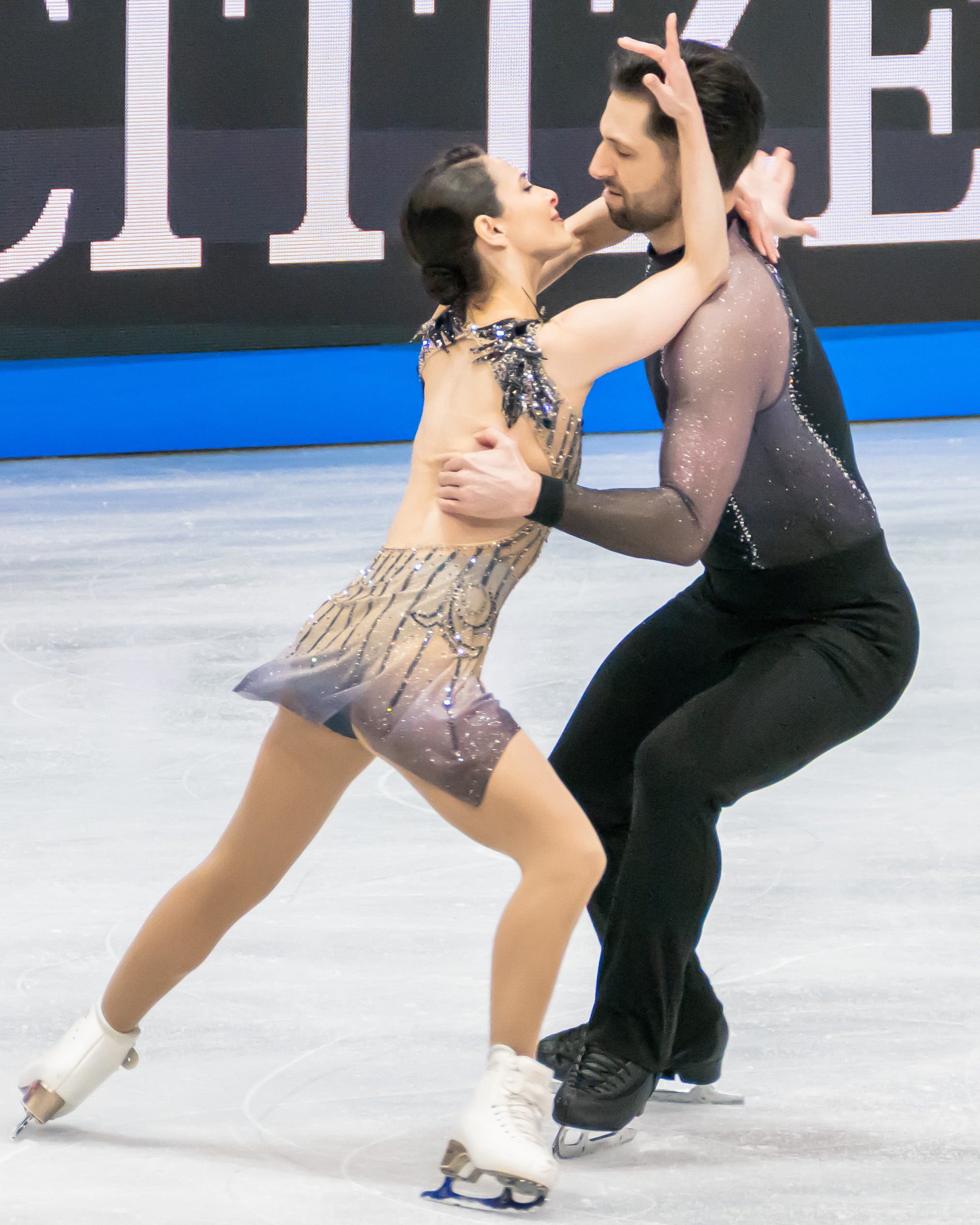
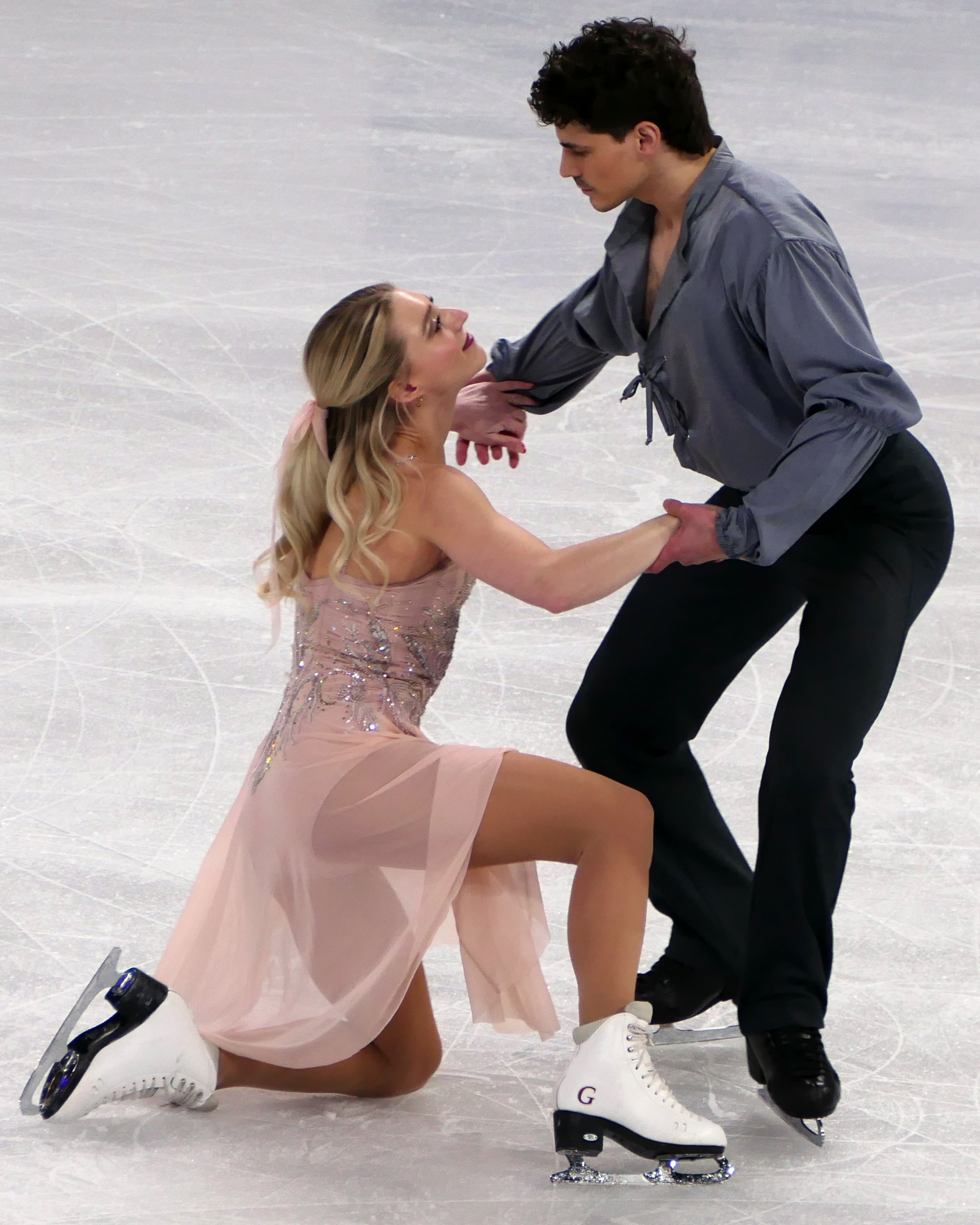
The 2025 Skate Canada International champions (from left to right): Ilia Malinin of the United States (men's singles); Mone Chiba of Japan (women's singles); Deanna Stellato-Dudek and Maxime Deschamps of Canada (pair skating); and Piper Gilles and Paul Poirier of Canada (ice dance)

Medalists
Discipline	Gold	Silver	Bronze
Men	(United States) Ilia Malinin	(Estonia) Aleksandr Selevko	(Japan) Kao Miura
Women	(Japan) Mone Chiba	(United States) Isabeau Levito	(Japan) Ami Nakai
Pairs	(Canada); Deanna Stellato-Dudek; Maxime Deschamps	(Germany); Minerva Fabienne Hase; Nikita Volodin	(United States); Ellie Kam; Daniel O'Shea
Ice dance	(Canada); Piper Gilles; Paul Poirier	(Lithuania); Allison Reed; Saulius Ambrulevičius	(Canada); Marjorie Lajoie; Zachary Lagha

== Results ==
=== Men's singles ===
Ilia Malinin of the United States set a new world record with his score of 228.97 in the free skate, defeating the previous world record of 227.79, which had been set by him at the 2024 World Figure Skating Championships. His gold medal finish marked Malinin's twelfth consecutive international victory and secured him a spot at the 2025 Grand Prix of Figure Skating Final in Nagoya, Japan. He defeated silver medalist Aleksandr Selevko of Estonia by a margin of over 76 points. Kao Miura of Japan finished in third place.

Men's results
Rank	Skater	Nation	Total points	SP		FS	
1st place, gold medalist(s)	Ilia Malinin	United States	333.81	1	104.84	1	228.97
2nd place, silver medalist(s)	Aleksandr Selevko	Estonia	257.21	3	91.28	2	165.93
3rd place, bronze medalist(s)	Kao Miura	Japan	253.69	4	89.80	3	163.89
4	Kazuki Tomono	Japan	251.46	2	92.07	5	159.39
5	Nika Egadze	Georgia	247.95	8	85.92	4	162.03
6	Nikolaj Memola	Italy	238.20	6	86.45	7	151.75
7	Roman Sadovsky	Canada	236.73	10	81.08	6	155.65
8	Stephen Gogolev	Canada	236.48	7	86.13	8	150.35
9	Tomoki Hiwatashi	United States	230.58	9	84.32	9	146.26
10	Kévin Aymoz	France	230.10	5	87.46	11	142.64
11	Vladimir Samoilov	Poland	225.33	11	80.75	10	144.58
12	Aleksa Rakic	Canada	216.90	12	75.50	12	141.40

=== Women's singles ===
Mone Chiba of Japan, who had been in the lead after the short program, won the gold medal after also finishing first in the free skate. It was Chiba's first Grand Prix event of the season. Isabeau Levito of the United States won the silver medal. Ami Nakai, also of Japan, won the bronze medal and secured herself a spot at the 2025–26 Grand Prix of Figure Skating Final, having previously won the 2025 Grand Prix de France.

Women's results
Rank	Skater	Nation	Total points	SP		FS	
1st place, gold medalist(s)	Mone Chiba	Japan	217.23	1	72.29	1	144.94
2nd place, silver medalist(s)	Isabeau Levito	United States	209.77	2	71.80	2	137.97
3rd place, bronze medalist(s)	Ami Nakai	Japan	203.09	4	66.55	3	136.54
4	Bradie Tennell	United States	195.07	5	65.55	4	129.52
5	Lara Naki Gutmann	Italy	192.05	3	68.11	5	123.94
6	Yuna Aoki	Japan	182.85	6	64.58	6	118.27
7	Sarah Everhardt	United States	174.59	7	63.47	9	111.12
8	Mariia Seniuk	Israel	171.75	10	57.40	8	114.35
9	Madeline Schizas	Canada	166.64	12	48.72	7	117.92
10	Yun Ah-sun	South Korea	166.57	9	58.84	11	107.73
11	Sara-Maude Dupuis	Canada	163.58	8	60.41	12	103.17
12	Uliana Shiryaeva	Canada	161.98	11	53.28	10	108.73

=== Pairs ===
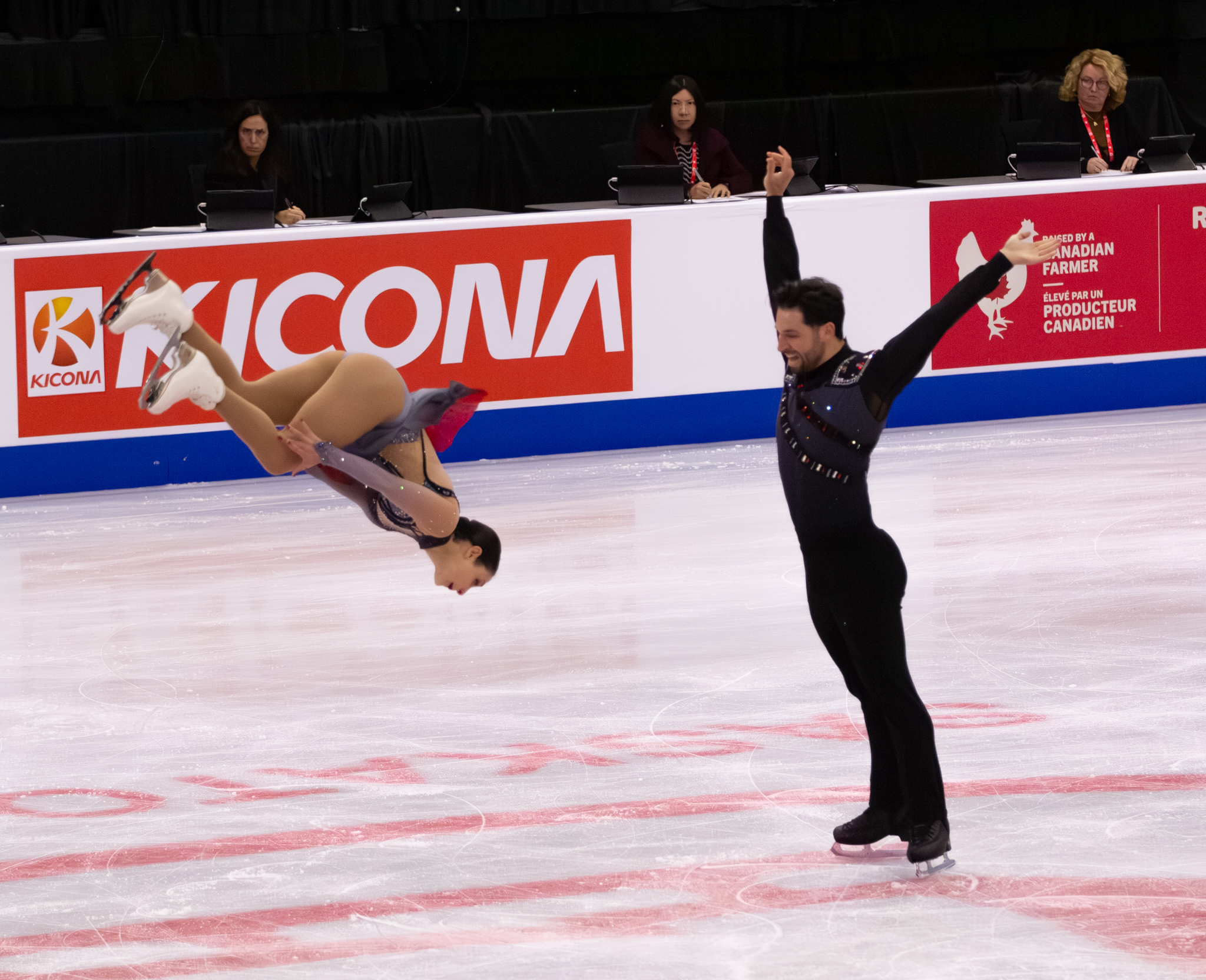
Deanna Stellato-Dudek of Canada performs a backflip with an assist from Maxime Deschamps at the 2025 Skate Canada International.

Deanna Stellato-Dudek and Maxime Deschamps of Canada won their third consecutive victory at the Skate Canada International, rallying back after a second-place finish in the short program. Minerva Fabienne Hase and Nikita Volodin of Germany had finished first in the short program with a four-point lead over Stellato-Dudek and Deschamps; however, a series of errors in their free skate caused them to lose their lead. Stellato-Dudek and Deschamps ultimately defeated Hase and Volodin by a margin of six points. "We're pretty happy with the performance," Stellato-Dudek stated afterward. "It was a significant improvement [from the 2025 Grand Prix de France] ... but we showed more of what we have been doing in practice." Volodin slipped during one of his jumps, while Hase fell during their throw triple flip. "We had two big mistakes," Hase stated, "but the rest of the elements we were really happy with and we showed what we wanted to, which was conditioning. We skated with full power to the end." Ellie Kam and Daniel O'Shea of the United States set a new personal best in the free skate, jumping from fourth place to third.

Pairs' results
Rank	Team	Nation	Total points	SP		FS	
1st place, gold medalist(s)	Deanna Stellato-Dudek; Maxime Deschamps	Canada	213.40	2	73.03	1	140.37
2nd place, silver medalist(s)	Minerva Fabienne Hase; Nikita Volodin	Germany	207.18	1	77.53	3	129.65
3rd place, bronze medalist(s)	Ellie Kam; Daniel O'Shea	United States	199.11	4	65.48	2	133.63
4	Lia Pereira; Trennt Michaud	Canada	186.54	3	70.66	5	115.88
5	Kelly Ann Laurin; Loucas Éthier	Canada	168.24	6	59.93	6	108.31
6	Anastasia Vaipan-Law; Luke Digby	Great Britain	167.94	8	48.85	4	119.09
7	Oxana Vouillamoz; Tom Bouvart	Switzerland	165.94	5	61.54	7	104.40
8	Ioulia Chtchetinina; Michał Woźniak	Poland	163.22	7	59.76	8	103.46

=== Ice dance ===
Piper Gilles and Paul Poirier of Canada won their sixth consecutive gold medal at the Skate Canada International, finishing with an overall score of 202.89. While Gilles and Poirier had been in the lead after the rhythm dance, they placed second in the free dance after some difficulty on their curved lift cost them four points, but they still won the event. Despite placing first in the free dance, Allison Reed and Saulius Ambrulevičius of Lithuania finished in second place. It was their highest finish at the Grand Prix. Marjorie Lajoie and Zachary Lagha of Canada leapfrogged from fourth place to win the bronze medal.

Ice dance results
Rank	Skater	Nation	Total points	RD		FD	
1st place, gold medalist(s)	Piper Gilles; Paul Poirier	Canada	202.89	1	85.38	2	117.51
2nd place, silver medalist(s)	Allison Reed; Saulius Ambrulevičius	Lithuania	200.92	2	80.89	1	120.03
3rd place, bronze medalist(s)	Marjorie Lajoie; Zachary Lagha	Canada	192.41	4	75.95	3	116.46
4	Christina Carreira; Anthony Ponomarenko	United States	191.23	3	76.83	4	114.40
5	Kateřina Mrázková; Daniel Mrázek	Czech Republic	181.19	5	74.29	8	106.90
6	Hannah Lim; Ye Quan	South Korea	180.41	6	70.97	5	109.44
7	Marie-Jade Lauriault; Romain Le Gac	Canada	179.41	7	70.84	6	108.57
8	Jennifer Janse van Rensburg; Benjamin Steffan	Germany	178.28	8	69.91	7	108.37
9	Emily Bratti; Ian Somerville	United States	166.32	10	63.22	9	103.10
10	Leah Neset; Artem Markelov	United States	165.19	9	65.51	10	99.68

== Records ==
The following new record high score was set during this event.

Record high scores
Date	Skater	Disc.	Segment	Score	Ref.
2 November	(United States) Ilia Malinin	Men	Free skate	228.97	

== Works cited ==
- "Special Regulations & Technical Rules – Single & Pair Skating and Ice Dance 2024" (PDF). International Skating Union. Archived (PDF) from the original on 3 June 2025.
