= Stephen Gogolev =

Canadian figure skater (born 2004)

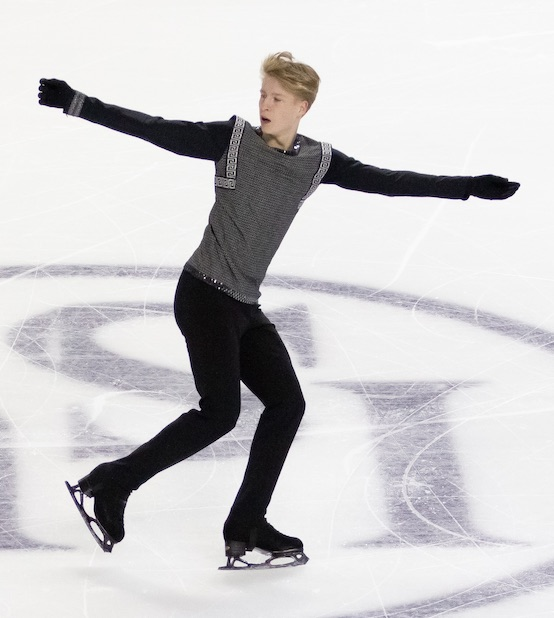
- Stephen Gogolev at the 2023 Four Continents Championships

Personal information
- Born: 22 December 2004 (age 21) Toronto, Ontario, Canada
- Height: 1.85 m (6 ft 1 in)

Figure skating career
- Country: Canada
- Discipline: Men's singles
- Coach: Lee Barkell; Benoît Richaud
- Skating club: Granite Club Toronto
- Began skating: 2010
- Highest WS: 7th (2025–26)

Medal record
Canadian Championships
Gold medal – first place	2026 Gatineau	Singles
Silver medal – second place	2019 Saint John	Singles
Junior Grand Prix Final
Gold medal – first place	2018–19 Vancouver	Singles

Stephen Gogolev (born 22 December 2004) is a Canadian figure skater. He is the 2026 Canadian national champion, 2025 Finlandia Trophy bronze medallist, 2025 CS Nebelhorn Trophy champion, 2025 CS Cranberry Cup International bronze medallist, and the 2023 CS Autumn Classic bronze medallist.

Gogolev is the 2018 Junior Grand Prix Final champion, the 2018 JGP Slovakia champion, the 2019 JGP U.S. silver medallist, the 2020 Bavarian Open junior champion, and the 2017 Canadian junior national champion.

He has set five junior world record scores. He holds the Canadian record total scores for junior and senior men, as well as the national historical record total scores for pre-novice and novice men.

== Personal life ==
Gogolev was born on 22 December 2004, in Toronto, Ontario, to Irina Gogoleva and Igor Gogolev. He comes from an athletic family; his parents were both gymnasts, and his mother was also a figure skater. He has an older brother, Peter Gogolev, who was a competitive kayaker. Gogolev holds dual Canadian and Russian citizenship. His hobbies include cars, mountain biking, surfing, and tennis. He has a YouTube channel featuring his mountain biking videos. Gogolev was a university student at the University of California, Irvine, majoring in political science. In the fall of 2024, he transferred to the University of Toronto.

== Career ==
=== Early years ===
Gogolev began skating at the age of six in 2010. He began skating in Yekaterinburg, ultimately choosing it over skiing. In Russia, he learned the triple toe loop, triple Salchow, and double Axel. While competing in Russia, he was coached by Alexander Tarasov at DYUSSH No. 8 Lokomotiv. During this time he came to train annually in the summers at the Toronto Cricket, Skating and Curling Club.

After moving to Canada, he began training at the Thornhill Figure Skating Club. He later joined Brian Orser and Lee Barkell at the Toronto Cricket, Skating and Curling Club in Toronto.

=== 2014–15 season ===
Competing at the pre-novice level, Gogolev won every competition he entered, including the Central Ontario sectional and Canadian national pre-novice titles as well as the gold medal at the 2015 Canada Winter Games, where he was the youngest competitor. He earned a historical record score while winning the pre-novice title at the 2015 Skate Canada Challenge. A video of Gogolev landing a triple Axel at age ten was shared by his club in January 2015, followed by a video of him landing a quad Salchow in May 2015.

=== 2015–16 season ===
Moving up to the novice level, Gogolev again had a golden season. He won the Central Ontario sectional, the 2016 Skate Canada Challenge, and the 2016 Canadian novice titles. He earned another historical record score at the 2016 Challenge. At Nationals, he landed a triple Axel in his free skate and won by over 20 points. After Nationals, Orser spoke about Gogolev landing a quad Salchow in practice, and that he had been working on a quad toe loop while being mentored by fellow skater Javier Fernández. In his international debut in March 2016, he won the advanced novice men title at the 2016 Coupe du Printemps.

=== 2016–17 season: Junior international debut ===
Competing at the junior level, Gogolev won every event in which he competed in Canada. He won the Central Ontario sectional, the 2017 Skate Canada Challenge, and the 2017 Canadian Championships junior titles. At Nationals, he came from behind to win the title over Conrad Orzel by a margin of four points. In February 2017, he won the advanced novice men title at the 2017 Bavarian Open. He attempted a quad Salchow for the first time in international competition at this event, having included it in his free skate this season.

=== 2017–18 season: Junior Grand Prix Final champion ===
Gogolev competed exclusively at the senior level this season. He won the inaugural Skate Ontario senior men provincial title. At the 2018 Skate Canada Challenge, Gogolev ranked seventh in the short program and fourth in the free skate to finish fourth overall. He was eleventh in the short program and ninth in the free skate at the 2018 Canadian Championships, and ended up tenth overall. Gogolev competed with a quad Salchow in his short and free programs and landed a quad toe loop for the first time in competition. Orser confirmed that he was able to land all the quadruple jumps. He was a member of Skate Canada's NextGen Team this season.

=== 2018–19 season ===
Gogolev was once again chosen to be part of Skate Canada's NextGen Team. In May 2018, he worked with choreographers Marie-France Dubreuil and Samuel Chouinard on an exhibition program for the upcoming season. He was assigned to compete at JGP Bratislava and JGP Canada. At the JGP Bratislava, Gogolev skated a clean short program to take the lead with a score of 77.67. In the free skate, he landed a quad Lutz, quad toe loop, and quad Salchow/triple toe combination to score 148.96 points. He was first in the free skate and won the gold medal. Gogolev became the first Canadian skater as well as the youngest skater to land a quad Lutz in competition. In his second JGP event in Richmond, Gogolev was less successful, finishing in fifth place while struggling with his jumps. He was named the first alternate to the Junior Grand Prix Final.

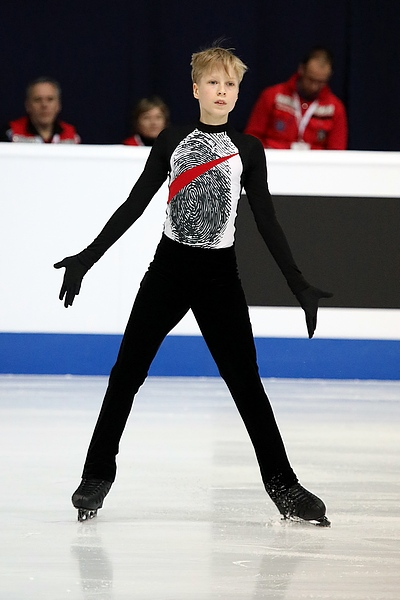
Gogolev performs his Sherlock Holmes free skate at the 2019 Junior Worlds

On 4 November 2018, Gogolev won another senior provincial title at the 2019 Skate Ontario Sectional Championships. Following the withdrawal of Andrew Torgashev from the Junior Grand Prix Final on 12 November, Gogolev was added to the entry list as the sixth competitor. Gogolev placed second in the short program at the Final. In the free skate, he set a new junior world record score of 154.76 points, taking first place in the free skate to win the gold medal. His score of 233.58 points was also a new junior world record. He was the youngest winner of the men's competition at the Junior Grand Prix Final.

At the 2019 Canadian Championships, Gogolev, skating as a senior, performed a clean short program to take the lead with a score of 88.77 points. In the free skate, he popped his quad Lutz, but landed a clean quad toe loop as well as a quad Salchow in combination to earn a score of 164.79 points. He took the silver medal.

On 20 January 2019, Skate Canada announced that Gogolev was selected to represent Canada at the 2019 World Junior Championships. He skated cleanly in the short program, albeit with two jumping passes he described as "a little bit shaky", placing tenth. In the free program, he doubled his planned quad Lutz and fell on a triple Axel but scored 143.66 points, winning a small bronze medal in the free skate and moving up to fifth overall. He ended his competition season with a performance at the exhibition gala.

On 14 March, Gogolev was added as a guest star in the Toronto and Hamilton shows of the 2019 Stars on Ice Canada tour.

=== 2019–20 season ===
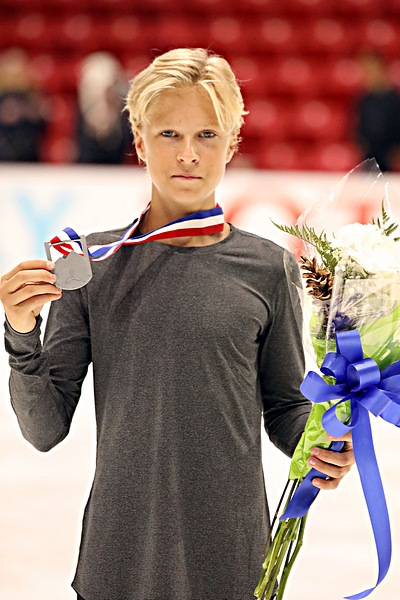
Stephen at the 2019 JGP Lake Placid

In 2019, Gogolev began representing the Granite Club with coach Lee Barkell, while training in Irvine, California with Rafael Arutyunyan.

On 2 July 2019, it was announced that Gogolev became a member of Skate Canada's 2019–20 National Team. He was also included in the list of skaters forming Skate Canada's 2019–20 NextGen Team posted on 15 July 2019. Gogolev began his season with a win at the 2019 Glacier Falls Summer Classic. He was assigned to compete at 2019 JGP Lake Placid and 2019 JGP Croatia Cup.

Gogolev earned a new personal best short program score in Lake Placid. He came fifth in the free program after taking two falls. He won the silver medal.

At JGP Croatia Cup, Gogolev skated a clean short program to score 72.12 points and place sixth. In the free skate, he landed a quadruple Salchow and two triple Axels, one in combination, but singled two of his jumps. He scored 140.34 points to place fifth in the free skate and ranked fifth overall. Gogolev ended the Junior Grand Prix season with a final ranking of eighth and was named as the second alternate to the Junior Grand Prix Final.

Gogolev was named as one of Toronto's top 20 under 20 in the activists and athletes category by Post City's Streets of Toronto website.

Gogolev withdrew from the 40th Volvo Open Cup in October 2019. Subsequently, he withdrew from the 2020 Canadian Championships due to an injury on his right ankle. He had also experienced a growth spurt. On 19 January 2020, he was selected to represent Canada at the 2020 World Junior Championships. He was also assigned to the 2020 Bavarian Open, where he won the junior men's event.

At the 2020 World Junior Championships, Gogolev popped his planned triple Axel in the short program into a single, resulting in a score of 67.27 and a placement of eighteenth. In the free skate, he started off strong in the first half of his program, but had some trouble with the jumps in the second half, missing two combinations. He later explained that the tongue of his boot broke as he went to do the planned triple Lutz, prohibiting him from properly performing his remaining jump elements. He placed fourteenth in the free skate to move up to seventeenth overall.

=== 2020–21 season ===
Gogolev was named to Skate Canada's 2020–21 NextGen Team in May. On 1 October, he was assigned to compete at 2020 Skate America, but he withdrew on 7 October due to an injury. Gogolev did not compete this season as he faced issues related to a growth cycle.

=== 2021–22 season: Senior international debut ===
Gogolev was assigned to compete at the 2021 Warsaw Cup, his senior international debut. He placed fourteenth in the short program, eighth in the free program, and eleventh overall. In December, he won the 2022 Skate Canada Challenge senior men's title, placing first in both the short and free programs. On 6 January 2022, he withdrew from the 2022 Canadian Championships after testing positive for COVID-19.

Gogolev was assigned to compete at the 2022 World Junior Championships on 14 January. Scheduled to be held in Sofia, Bulgaria, the championship was subsequently delayed from early March to mid-April and then relocated to Tallinn, Estonia, due to Bulgarian pandemic measures. Gogolev skated a clean short program, scoring 78.75 points and placing sixth. In the free skate, he scored 145.74 points and placed fifth.

=== 2022–23 season ===
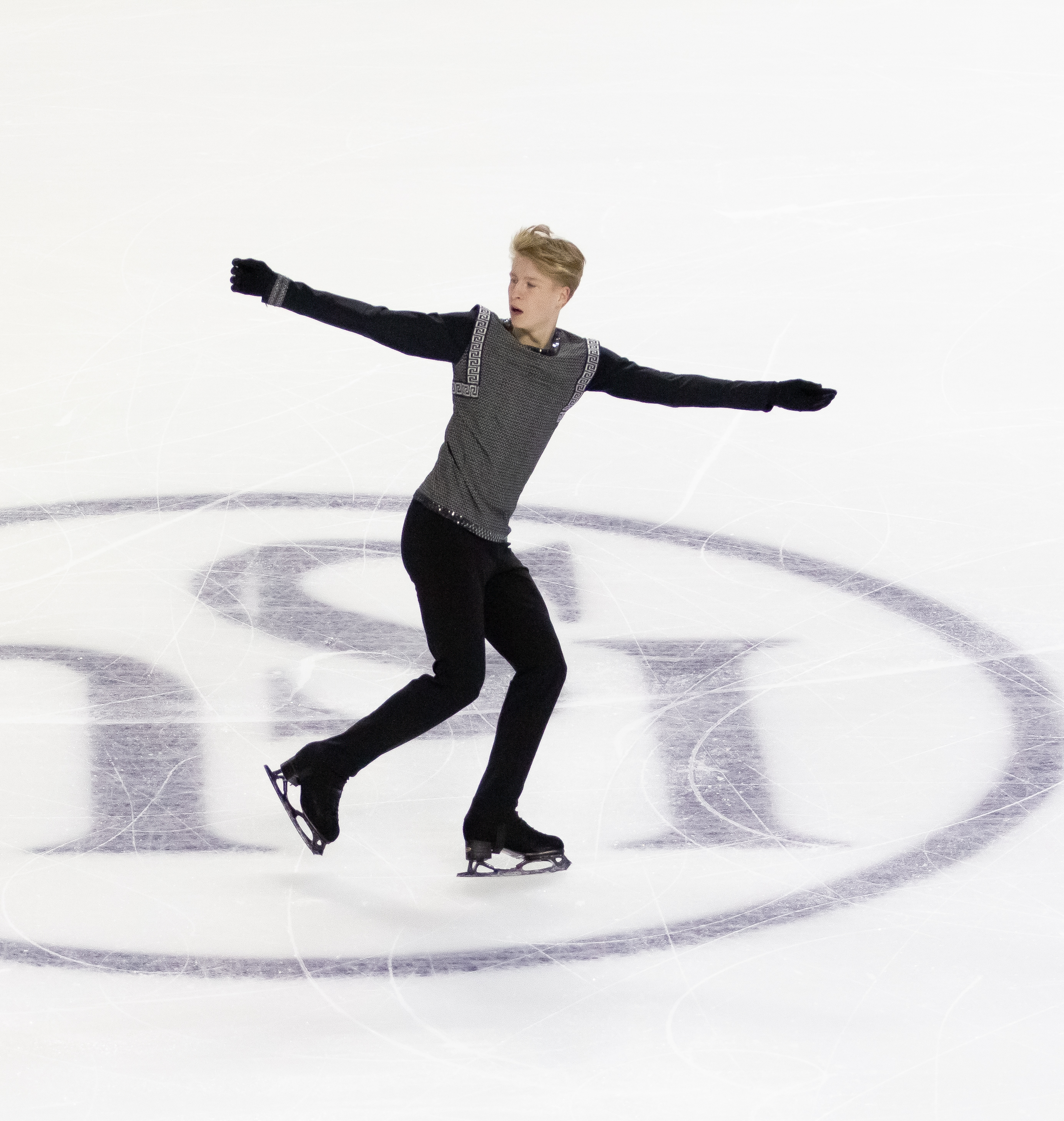
Gogolev at the 2023 Four Continents Championships

On 22 July 2022, it was announced that Gogolev had been assigned to two Grand Prix events: 2022 Skate Canada International and 2022 NHK Trophy. He was named to the Canadian national team on 25 July. He began his season at the 2022 Glacier Falls Summer Classic, where he debuted a new short program that he skated cleanly, scoring 88.68. He was assigned to the 2022 CS U.S. International Figure Skating Classic, where he placed sixth. At his Grand Prix debut in Mississauga at the 2022 Skate Canada International, Gogolev made errors in his short program and placed eleventh. He rallied back with a strong free skate, where he placed fifth, moving up to seventh overall. At 2022 NHK Trophy, Gogolev finished ninth in the short program, but came back in the free skate with a score of 152.01, placing seventh. He moved up to eighth with a season's best total score of 221.02.

At the 2023 Canadian Championships, Gogolev struggled with his short program, scoring 49.97 and placing seventeenth. He returned in the free skate, scoring 170.16 and placing first in the segment, rising to fourth overall. On 15 January, he was assigned to compete at the 2023 Four Continents Championships. One of his spins was invalidated in the short program, where he scored 72.82 and placed eleventh. In the free skate, he scored 136.94 and placed eleventh, finishing thirteenth overall.

Gogolev was named to the Canadian team for the 2023 World Team Trophy in Tokyo. He finished twelfth of twelve skaters in the short program, making errors on all three jumping passes. He popped two jumps in the free skate, finishing eleventh in that segment, and said he had "mixed feelings" about the competition. Gogolev hoped to improve consistency going forward.

=== 2023–24 season ===
On 5 July, Gogolev was named to the Canadian National team for 2023–2024. On 18 August he began his season at a Skate Ontario sectional event in Waterloo, debuting his new short program. He was added to the entry list for 2023 Autumn Classic International on 21 August. He skated a clean short program in Montreal, earning a new personal best short program score of 86.25. He placed fifth in the free skate with a score of 147.01. His total score of 233.26 earned him a bronze medal, his first senior international medal.

Gogolev was assigned to two Grand Prix events this season. At 2023 Skate America he skated to seventh place in the short program, eleventh in the free skate, and eleventh overall. He was also assigned to 2023 Grand Prix de France the week of the event. In Angers he skated a clean short program, placing fifth with a score of 86.14. He placed tenth in the free skate with score of 142.60, placing seventh overall with a score of 228.74.

Prior to the 2024 Canadian National Figure Skating Championships Gogolev had a flare up of a back injury. Competing in the short program he earned a score of 53.80 and placed 13th in the segment. He withdrew from the event due to the injury and did not compete again this season. In June 2024 he participated in Benoît Richaud's Peak Ice Camp in Courmayeur, Italy.

=== 2024–25 season: Injury struggles ===
On 9 June 2024 Gogolev was assigned to two Grand Prix events: the 2024 Skate Canada International and the 2024 NHK Trophy. He was named to the Canadian national team for the 2024-25 season on 3 July 2024.

He left Rafael Arutyunyan in Irvine, California and moved his training base back to Toronto at the Granite Club with Lee Barkell. He also added Benoit Richaud to his coaching team.

Returning to competition at a Skate Ontario Sectional event in Waterloo, Ontario, he debuted a new short program, where he attempted a quadruple loop in competition for the first time, and won the gold medal. Going on to compete on the 2024–25 Grand Prix circuit, he placed fifth in the short program at the Skate Canada International but tenth in the free skate, dropping to ninth-place overall. Gogolev withdrew from the 2024 NHK Trophy due to his ongoing back injury a few days prior to the event. Gogolev subsequently withdrew from the 2025 Canadian Championships.

=== 2025–26 season: Milano Cortina Olympics, first national title, and Grand Prix bronze medal ===
Gogolev started the season by competing at the 2025 CS Cranberry Cup International, where he won the bronze medal and scored a personal best in the free skate segment. He subsequently went on to win the 2025 CS Nebelhorn Trophy, making this his first senior international gold medal.

In November, Gogolev placed eighth at 2025 Skate Canada International. Three weeks later, he finished third at 2025 Finlandia Trophy, winning his first Grand Prix medal. "It means a lot to me to win this medal, because it really shows that all the work that I put in pays off," he said. "Through the difficult times in the past years, what helped me the most was hope."

At the 2026 Canadian Championships, Gogolev won both the short and free program, winning the gold medal overall. This victory came nine years after he won the 2017 Canadian Junior Championships. “Coming back this season is very special,” he said. “There were even times where I thought maybe it’s not worth continuing doing because it was year after year where I wasn’t able to perform and compete the way I wanted to or even compete at all. So, I’m very, very thankful and happy to be here right now.” He was subsequently named to the 2026 Winter Olympic team.

On 7 February, Gogolev competed in the 2026 Winter Olympics Figure Skating Team Event short program, where he placed third, earning a personal best short program score. "It was a very special moment for me,” he said following his performance. "I think just having good practice led into this competition and the trust in my training. As well as the confidence in myself and the teams." The following day, Gogolev competed in the free skate segment of the Team Event, scoring a personal best free skate score and finishing in fourth place. With his placements, Team Canada finished in fifth place overall.

On 10 February, Gogolev competed in the short program in the Men's singles event at the 2026 Winter Olympics. He placed tenth in the short program after stepping out of a planned triple Axel. "I think experience-wise, I was able to know what to expect out of the performance and the audience," he said following his performance. From a physical perspective, this is my third time competing in four days, so it is a little bit physically challenging. You have to get down and come back up after each performance." Two days later, Gogolev skated a clean free skate that included three quadruple jumps. He ultimately surpassed his previous personal best free skate score by almost fifteen points and his personal best combined total score by over eighteen points. With that performance, Gogolev placed second in the free skate segment and due to many skaters that placed ahead of him in the short program faltering during their free skates, moved up to fifth place overall. "I think I did quite well for Olympics," he said following his performance. "And I'm very happy with the total results. Considering this is my personal best, the season's best, overall, I'm very happy."

Gogolev completed his season at the 2026 World Championships. He placed fifth in the short program with a score of 94.38 points, but climbed to fourth in the free skate with 186.66 points, finishing fourth overall. He set personal bests in both the short program and the free skate, and hence also a personal best in the total score. “I’m really, really happy about this season,” he said after the free skate. “One highlight was the free program at the Olympic Games, placing in the top five. Another highlight is obviously these World Championships—my first Worlds—and setting a personal best was very special.”

=== 2026–27 season ===
Gogolev begun the new season at the 2026 Skate Canada International. In the short program, Gogolev missed his required combination jump and singled his solo jump, thus making the element invalid. These costly mistakes led him to place twelfth in that segment. In the free skate, he moved up the rankings; placing third in the free skate segment and fourth overall. “I think the main takeaway is definitely having confidence in myself and trusting the training that I've been putting a good bit in,” he said after the free skate. “I'm happy that my body can handle it, obviously, and I can keep putting the reps in.”

== Programs ==
- Program details mentioned at first occurrence

Competition and exhibition programs by season
Season	Short program	Free skate program	Exhibition program
2014–15	Medley: 1. "POW"; 2. "In 3's"; Performed by Beastie Boys	"Cello Wars (Star Wars Parody)": Performed by The Piano Guys	—N/a
2015–16	"Les Patineurs": Performed by Giacomo Meyerbeer	Medley: 1. "Sing, Sing, Sing"; 2. "Harlem Nocturne"	"Spider-Man Theme": From Spider-Man; Performed by Michael Bublé
2016–17	"Live and Let Die": From Live and Let Die; Performed by David Garrett; Choreo. by Mary Angela Larmer	Medley: 1. The Magic Flute; 2. Eine kleine Nachtmusik; 3. Concerto for Flute and Harp, K. 299: II. Andantino; Composed by Wolfgang Amadeus Mozart; Choreo. by David Wilson	"Run Boy Run": Performed by Woodkid; Choreo. by Mary Angela Larmer
2017–18	"Run Boy Run"	Medley: 1. The Magic Flute; 2. Eine kleine Nachtmusik; 3. Concerto for Flute and Harp, K. 299: II. Andantio	—N/a
2018–19	"Run Boy Run"	Sherlock Holmes: Original Motion Picture Soundtrack: Composed by Hans Zimmer; Choreo. by David Wilson	"Stole the Show": Performed by Kygo; Choreo. by Marie-France Dubreuil & Samuel Chouinard
2019–20	Medley: 1. Grand Waltz; From Anyuta; Composed by Valery Gavrilin; 2. "Russian Sailor's Dance"; From The Red Poppy; Composed by Reinhold Glière; Choreo. by Nadezda Kanaeva	Medley: 1. "The Rhythm of the Heat"; 2. "Darkness"; 3. "Red Rain"; Performed by Peter Gabriel; Choreo. by Shae-Lynn Bourne	—N/a
2020–21	"Repeat After Me": Performed by Armin van Buuren, Dimitri Vegas & Like Mike & W&W; Choreo. by Shae-Lynn Bourne	Medley: 1. "The Rhythm of the Heat"; 2. "Darkness"; 3. "Red Rain"	—N/a
2021–22	"Repeat After Me"	Medley: 1. "The Rhythm of the Heat"; 2. "Darkness"; 3. "Red Rain"	—N/a
2022–23	"Dream State": Performed by Son Lux; Choreo. by Shae-Lynn Bourne	Spartacus: Composed by Aram Khachaturian; Choreo. by Nadezda Kanaeva	"Repeat After Me"
2023–24	"The Sound of Silence": Performed by Disturbed; Choreo. by Shae-Lynn Bourne	"Time Lapse": Performed by Christian Reindl, Lucie Paradis, Adrian Berenguer, Uno Helmersson, Michael Nyman; Choreo. by Benoît Richaud	—N/a
2024–25	"Mugzy's Move Medley": 1. Zip Gun Pop; 2. Mugzy's Move; 3. Hey Pachuco!; Performed by Royal Crown Revue; Choreo. by Benoît Richaud	"Time Lapse"	—N/a
2025–26	"Mugzy's Move Medley"	"Piano Concerto No. 2 in C minor, Op. 18": Composed by Sergei Rachmaninoff; Choreo. by Benoît Richaud	"Mugzy's Move Medley"
2025–26	"Mugzy's Move Medley"	"Piano Concerto No. 2 in C minor, Op. 18": Composed by Sergei Rachmaninoff; Choreo. by Benoît Richaud	"Repeat After Me"

== World record scores ==
World record scores
Date	Segment	Score	Event	Ref.
23 August 2018	Short program	77.67	2018 JGP Slovakia	
24 August 2018	Free skating	148.96	2018 JGP Slovakia	
24 August 2018	Combined total	226.63	2018 JGP Slovakia	

== Competitive highlights ==
- GP – Event of the ISU Grand Prix Series
- JGP – Event of the ISU Junior Grand Prix Series
- CS – Event of the ISU Challenger Series
- TBD – Assigned
- WD – Withdrew from event
- Medals at team events are awarded for the team results only. Individual placements at team events are listed in parentheses.

Competition placements at senior level
Season	2017–18	2018–19	2021–22	2022–23	2023–24	2024–25	2025–26	2026-27
Winter Olympics							5th	
Winter Olympics (Team event)							5th	
Worlds Championships							4th	
Four Continents Championships				13th				
Canadian Championships	10th	2nd		4th	WD		1st	
World Team Trophy				6th (12th)				
GP Finland							3rd	TBD
GP France					7th			
GP NHK Trophy				8th				
GP Skate America					11th			
GP Skate Canada				7th		9th	8th	4th
CS Autumn Classic					3rd			
CS Cranberry Cup							3rd	
CS Nebelhorn Trophy							1st	
CS U.S. Classic				6th				
CS Warsaw Cup			11th					
Skate Canada Challenge	4th		1st					

Competition placements at junior level
Season	2016–17	2018–19	2019–20	2021–22
World Junior Championships		5th	17th	5th
Junior Grand Prix Final		1st		
Canadian Championships	1st			
JGP Canada		5th		
JGP Croatia			5th	
JGP Slovakia		1st		
JGP United States			2nd	
Bavarian Open			1st	
Skate Canada Challenge	1st			

== Detailed results ==
ISU personal best scores in the +5/-5 GOE System
Segment	Type	Score	Event
Total	TSS	281.04	2026 World Championships
Short program	TSS	94.38	2026 World Championships
Short program	TES	53.90	2026 World Championships
Short program	PCS	40.48	2026 World Championships
Free skating	TSS	186.66	2026 World Championships
Free skating	TES	103.40	2026 World Championships
Free skating	PCS	83.26	2026 World Championships

=== Senior level ===
Results in the 2017–18 season
Date	Event	SP		FS		Total	
Date	Event	P	Score	P	Score	P	Score
29 Nov – 3 Dec 2017	2018 Skate Canada Challenge	7	63.77	4	136.36	4	200.13
8–14 Jan 2018	(Canada) 2018 Canadian Championships	11	72.61	9	148.20	10	220.81

Results in the 2018–19 season
Date	Event	SP		FS		Total	
Date	Event	P	Score	P	Score	P	Score
14–20 Jan 2019	(Canada) 2019 Canadian Championships	1	88.77	2	164.79	2	253.36

Results in the 2021–22 season
Date	Event	SP		FS		Total	
Date	Event	P	Score	P	Score	P	Score
13–17 Nov 2021	(Poland) 2021 CS Warsaw Cup	14	67.80	8	138.37	11	206.17
1–5 Dec 2021	2022 Skate Canada Challenge	1	78.17	1	157.30	1	235.47

Results in the 2022–23 season
Date	Event	SP		FS		Total	
Date	Event	P	Score	P	Score	P	Score
12–16 Sep 2022	(United States) 2022 CS U.S. International Classic	5	72.89	6	135.54	6	208.43
28–30 Oct 2022	2022 Skate Canada International	11	57.94	5	152.70	7	210.64
18–20 Nov 2022	(Japan) 2022 NHK Trophy	9	69.01	7	152.01	8	221.02
9–15 Jan 2023	(Canada) 2023 Canadian Championships	17	49.97	1	170.16	4	220.13
7–12 Feb 2023	(United States) 2023 Four Continents Championships	11	72.82	11	136.94	13	209.76
13–16 Apr 2023	(Japan) 2023 World Team Trophy	12	49.78	11	125.17	6 (12)	174.95

Results in the 2023–24 season
Date	Event	SP		FS		Total	
Date	Event	P	Score	P	Score	P	Score
14–16 Sep 2023	(Canada) 2023 CS Autumn Classic International	2	86.25	5	147.01	3	233.26
28–30 Oct 2022	(United States) 2023 Skate America	7	74.73	11	135.75	11	210.48
3–5 Nov 2023	2023 Grand Prix de France	5	86.14	10	142.60	7	228.74
8–14 Jan 2024	(Canada) 2024 Canadian Championships	13	53.80	—N/a	—N/a	–	WD

Results in the 2024–25 season
Date	Event	SP		FS		Total	
Date	Event	P	Score	P	Score	P	Score
25–27 Oct 2024	2024 Skate Canada International	5	82.70	10	134.14	9	216.84

Results in the 2025–26 season
Date	Event	SP		FS		Total	
Date	Event	P	Score	P	Score	P	Score
7–10 Aug 2025	(United States) 2025 CS Cranberry Cup International	11	67.22	2	164.59	3	231.81
25–27 Sep 2025	(Germany) 2025 CS Nebelhorn Trophy	1	90.19	1	164.87	1	255.06
31 Oct – 2 Nov 2025	2025 Skate Canada International	7	86.13	8	150.35	8	236.48
21–23 Nov 2025	(Finland) 2025 Finlandia Trophy	2	89.35	3	164.26	3	253.61
6–11 Jan 2026	(Canada) 2026 Canadian Championships	1	99.60	1	175.90	1	275.50
6–8 Feb 2026	(Italy) 2026 Winter Olympics – Team event	3	92.99	4	171.93	5	—N/a
10–13 Feb 2026	(Italy) 2026 Winter Olympics	10	87.41	2	186.37	5	273.78
24–29 Mar 2026	(Czech Republic) 2026 World Championships	5	94.38	4	186.66	4	281.04

Results in the 2026–27 season
Date	Event	SP		FS		Total	
Date	Event	P	Score	P	Score	P	Score
30 Oct – 1 Nov 2026	2026 Skate Canada International	12	66.73	3	165.99	4	232.72
20–22 Nov 2026	(Finland) 2026 Finlandia Trophy						

=== Junior level ===
Results in the 2016–17 season
Date	Event	SP		FS		Total	
Date	Event	P	Score	P	Score	P	Score
30 Nov – 4 Dec 2016	2017 Skate Canada Challenge	1	76.24	1	138.77	1	215.01
16–22 Jan 2017	(Canada) 2017 Canadian Championships (Junior)	2	67.18	1	142.88	1	210.06

Results in the 2018–19 season
Date	Event	SP		FS		Total	
Date	Event	P	Score	P	Score	P	Score
22–25 Aug 2018	2018 JGP Slovakia	1	77.67	1	148.96	1	226.63
12–15 Sep 2018	2018 JGP Canada	7	63.63	5	124.04	5	187.67
6–9 Dec 2018	(Canada) 2018–19 Junior Grand Prix Final	2	78.82	1	154.76	1	233.58
4–10 Mar 2019	(Croatia) 2019 World Junior Championships	10	77.00	3	143.66	5	220.66

Results in the 2019–20 season
Date	Event	SP		FS		Total	
Date	Event	P	Score	P	Score	P	Score
28–31 Aug 2019	2019 JGP United States	2	78.85	5	124.85	2	203.70
25–28 Sep 2019	2019 JGP Croatia	6	72.12	5	140.34	5	212.46
3–9 Feb 2020	(Germany) 2020 Bavarian Open	1	81.18	1	146.50	1	227.68
2–8 Mar 2020	(Estonia) 2020 World Junior Championships	18	67.27	14	124.18	17	191.45

Results in the 2021–22 season
Date	Event	SP		FS		Total	
Date	Event	P	Score	P	Score	P	Score
18–21 Apr 2021	(Estonia) 2022 World Junior Championships	6	78.75	5	145.74	5	224.49
