= Claude Péri =

French figure skater and coach

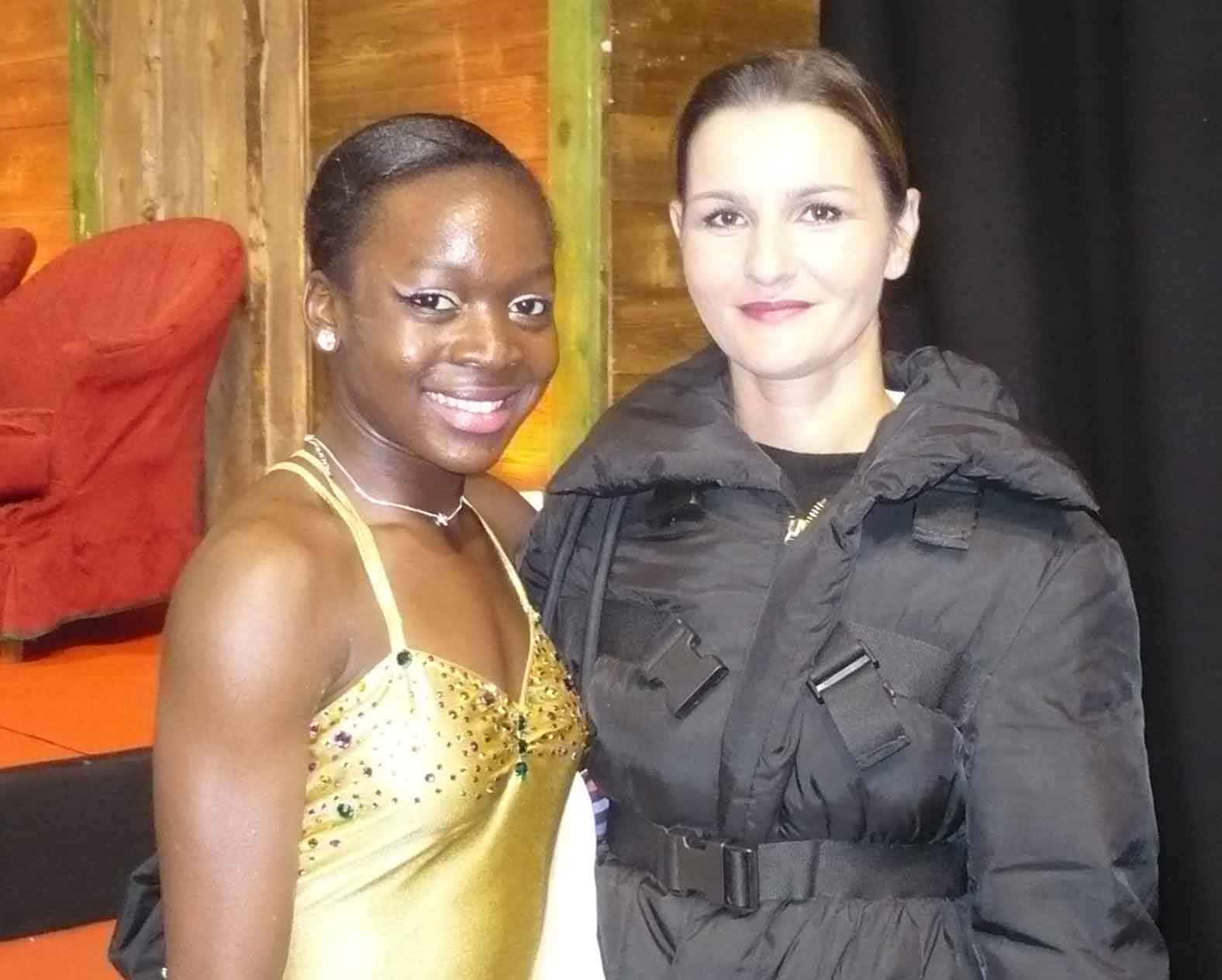
- Péri-Thévenard with Yrétha Silété

Personal information
- Other names: Claude Péri-Thévenard
- Born: 9 March 1972 (age 54) Dammarie-lès-Lys, France

Figure skating career
- Country: France
- Skating club: CSG Dammarie-lès-Lys
- Retired: 1990

Claude Péri-Thévenard (born 9 March 1972) is a French figure skating coach and former competitor. A two-time national silver medalist, she represented France at the World Junior, World, and European Championships. In 1990, she retired from competition and began coaching at CSG Dammarie-lès-Lys. In 2012, Péri-Thévenard signed a two-year contract to serve as a national coach. As a coach, she is best known for her work with two-time French national champion Yrétha Silété, whom she coached from the age of six.

Her current students include:

- Maé-Bérénice Méité
- Vanessa James / Morgan Ciprès
- Laurine Lecavelier

Her former students include:

- Florent Amodio
- Chafik Besseghier
- Jérémie Colot
- Yrétha Silété

== Competitive highlights ==
International
Event	1986–87	1987–88	1988–89	1989–90
World Championships		19th		
European Championships		16th	17th	
International de Paris		7th	10th	
International St. Gervais		3rd		
Skate America			8th	
International: Junior
World Junior Champ.	10th			
National
French Championships		2nd	2nd	5th
