= Fiona Bombardier =

Canadian pair skater (born 2005)

Personal information
- Born: January 26, 2005 (age 21)
- Home town: Newmarket, Ontario, Canada

Figure skating career
- Country: Canada
- Discipline: Pair skating (since 2023); Women's singles (until 2024)
- Partner: Loucas Éthier (since 2026); Benjamin Mimar (2024–25); Gabriel Farand (2023–24)
- Coach: Stéphanie Valois; Yvan Desjardins; Annie Barabé
- Skating club: Richmond Training Center
- Began skating: 2009

Medal record
Canadian Championships
Bronze medal – third place	2023 Oshawa	Singles

Fiona Bombardier (born January 26, 2005) is a Canadian pair skater. With her previous skating partner, Benjamin Mimar, she is the 2024 CS Warsaw Cup bronze medalist.

As a single skater, Bombardier is the 2023 Canadian national bronze medalist.

== Personal life ==
Bombardier was born on 26 January 2005 to parents Josée Chouinard and Jean-Michel Bombardier, both former competitive figure skaters for Canada. She has a twin brother, Noah.

As of 2025, Bombardier is a student at the University of Guelph.

== Career ==
=== Single skating ===
==== Early years ====
Despite skating from a young age, Bombardier would later say that she had been unaware of her mother's successful career as a competitive figure skater until she was ten. She initially trained at the Newmarket Skating Club, before moving to the Richmond Training Centre circa 2018.

When the 2020–21 edition of Skate Canada Challenge was held virtually in the midst of the COVID-19 pandemic, Bombardier won the short program in the junior women's competition, but dropped to sixth overall after coming tenth in the free skate segment. She enjoyed more success the following season, winning the silver medal at the 2022 Canadian Junior Championships. Following this result she was assigned to make her international debut at the Egna Spring Trophy. Initially sixth after the short program, she came second in the free skate, rising to third overall and capturing the bronze medal. Bombardier said that "the score was satisfying, and I accomplished my goals."

==== 2022–23 season ====
In November, Bombardier was assigned to the 2022 IceChallenge, coming sixth in the junior category. The following month, competing as a senior in the domestic field, she took the gold medal at the Skate Canada Challenge. Third after the short program, she won the free skate and the competition, saying afterward that "I was here to battle for gold. I knew what I was able to do and just fought for it."

Bombardier entered the 2023 Canadian Championships as a podium contender, and finished third in the short program. She went on to maintain her standing in the free skate, winning the bronze medal, despite difficulties on her double Axel jumps. Following her success at the national championship, Bombardier was assigned to make her international senior debut at the Coupe de Printemps, and was under consideration as one of Canada's two women's entries at the 2023 World Team Trophy. However, after sustaining a concussion in practice, she had to end her season prematurely. She later remarked that the "only reason I cried is not being able to go to the competition, not even because of the pain."

=== Partnership with Farand ===
==== 2023–24 season ====
In the off-season, Bombardier contemplated exploring the pair skating discipline that her father had found success in, noting "he really liked it, so I wanted to try it as well. I struggled a lot with the triple toe combo, and I know that's a big element for international in senior ladies. So I decided, why not try pairs?" Coach Bruno Marcotte invited her to partner with Gabriel Farand, whose prior partnership had just ended.

While beginning her pairs career, Bombardier continued to compete as a singles skater, citing success that Lia Pereira had the prior season doing both at the same time. Making her Challenger debut at the 2023 CS Finlandia Trophy, she placed eleventh at the event. Despite difficulties in the free skate, she said that, "I was still here to gain some experience and have a good time and that's what I did." At Skate Canada Challenge, Bombardier/Farand won the silver medal in the senior pairs event, while she came ninth in the women's.

Concluding the season at the 2024 Canadian Championships, Bombardier/Farand were fifth in the pairs event. In the women's event, Bombardier struggled, finishing sixteenth. Coach Marcotte said afterward that she "is going to have to make a choice, for sure. At the end of the day, to be a World contender doing both … no, it's not sustainable."

=== Partnership with Mimar ===
==== 2024–25 season ====
Following the 2023–24 season, Farand decided to retire from competitive skating. Bombardier quickly formed a new partnership with Benjamin Mimar, who had previously been a national silver medalist with partner Brooke McIntosh. The new team trained under Mimar's coach Andrew Evans. The new team were assigned to make their Challenger debut at the 2024 CS Warsaw Cup. They won the bronze medal in Warsaw, Bombardier's first international pair podium appearance. Soon after, she learned that what she had heretofore believed to be a minor hand injury was actually a fractured bone, which affected their training in advance of the national championships.

At the 2025 Canadian Championships, Bombardier/Mimar finished in fourth place. They were named as first alternates to the Canadian team for the Four Continents and World Championships.

=== Partnership with Éthier ===
==== 2025–2026 season ====
In late April, it was announced that Bombardier had ended her partnership with Benjamin Mimar. On May 12 2026, it was announced that Fiona had formed a new partnership with Loucas Éthier.

== Programs ==
=== With Mimar ===
Season	Short program	Free skating
2024–2025	Beautiful Things by Benson Boone choreo. by Julie Marcotte	Epilogue by Justin Hurwitz; City of Stars (from La La Land) by Ryan Gosling and Emma Stone choreo. by Julie Marcotte

=== As a single skater ===
Season	Short program	Free skating
2023–2024	Havana performed by Madilyn Bailey; Fuego by TCTS, Gotsome, and Cumbiafrica; Havana (Remix) performed by Poylow and CPX, feat. Britt Lari choreo. by Sébastien Britten and Danielle Rose	Alegría (from Alegría) by René Dupéré choreo. by Sébastien Britten and Danielle Rose
2022–2023	Take the "A" Train by Billy Strayhorn performed by Nikki Yanofsky choreo. by Sébastien Britten and Danielle Rose	Alegría (from Alegría) by René Dupéré choreo. by Sébastien Britten and Danielle Rose

== Competitive highlights ==
- GP – Event of the ISU Grand Prix Series
- CS – Event of the ISU Challenger Series
- TBD – Assigned
- WD – Withdrew from competition

=== Pair skating with Mimar ===
Competition placements at senior level
Season	2024–25	2025–26
Canadian Championships	4th	
CS Warsaw Cup	3rd	

=== Pair skating with Farand ===
Competition placements at senior level
Season	2023–24
Canadian Championships	5th
Skate Canada Challenge	2nd

=== Women's singles ===
Competition placements at senior level
Season	2022–23	2023–24
CS Finlandia Trophy		11th
Cranberry Cup		8th
Canadian Championships	3rd	16th
Skate Canada Challenge	1st	9th

Competition placements at junior level
Season	2021–22	2022–23
Egna Spring Trophy	3rd	
IceChallenge		6th
Canadian Championships	2nd	
Skate Canada Challenge	17th	
