= Bruno Marcotte =

Canadian pairs figure skater and coach

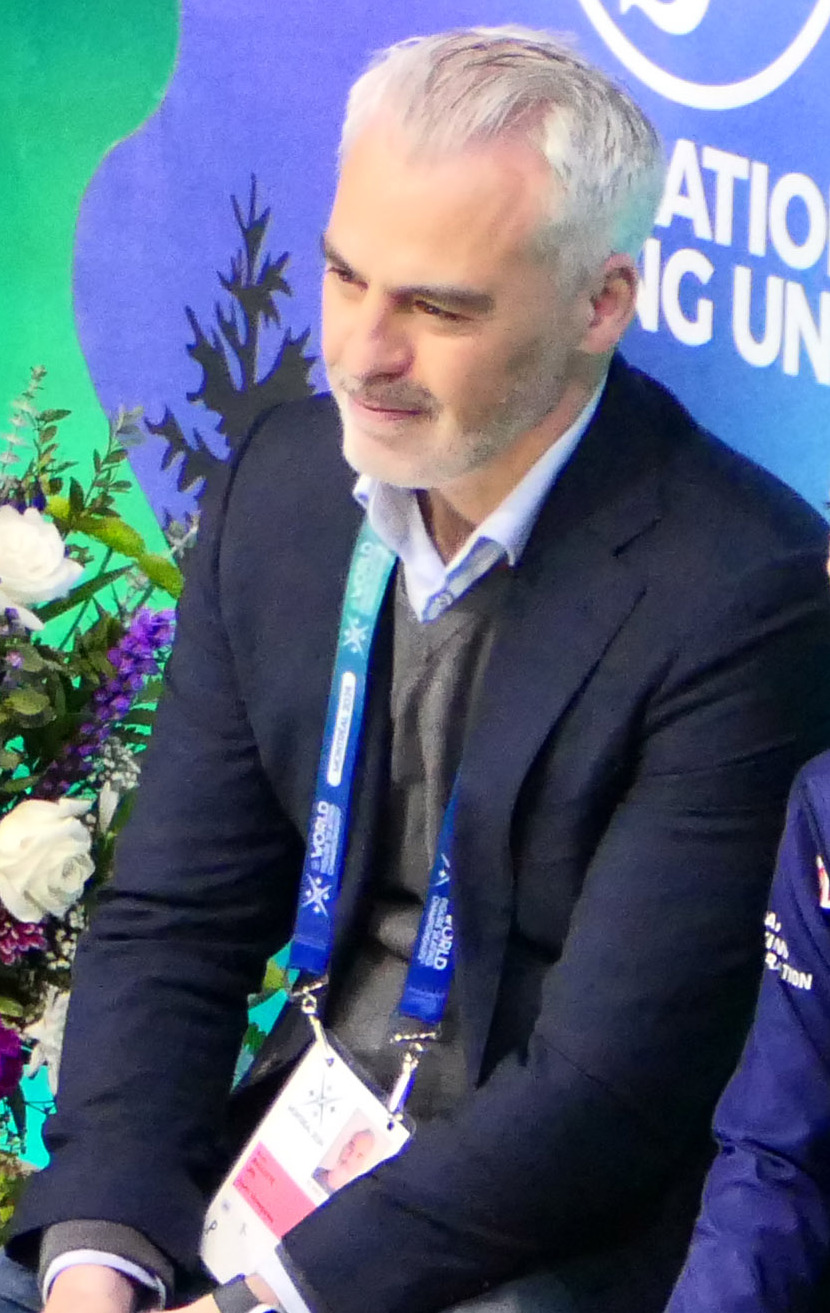
- Marcotte in 2024

Personal information
- Born: September 10, 1974 (age 52) Montreal, Quebec, Canada
- Height: 1.75 m (5 ft 9 in)

Figure skating career
- Country: Canada
- Skating club: CPA Beloeil
- Retired: 2002

Bruno Marcotte (born September 10, 1974) is a Canadian figure skating coach and former competitor in pairs. He is the 1993 World Junior bronze medallist with Isabelle Coulombe and the 2000 Nebelhorn Trophy champion with Valérie Marcoux.

== Personal life ==
Marcotte was born October 10, 1974, in Montreal, Quebec. His sister, Julie, is a figure skating choreographer, who choreographs for his students. In July 2014, it was publicly announced that he was engaged to his student Meagan Duhamel. The couple married on June 5, 2015, in Bermuda. The couple have two daughters.

== Competitive figure skating career ==
Marcotte competed with Isabelle Coulombe early in his pairs career. They won the bronze medal at the 1993 World Junior Championships.

Marcotte teamed up with Nadia Micallef in around 1995. The pair won the 1998 Golden Spin of Zagreb and placed fourth at the 1999 Canadian Championships.

Marcotte formed a partnership with Valérie Marcoux in around 2000. They placed fourth twice at the Canadian Figure Skating Championships, fourth at the 2002 Four Continents Championships and 12th at the 2002 World Championships. The team broke up after the 2001–02 season and Marcotte retired from competition.

== Coaching career ==
Following his competitive figure skating career, Marcotte became a pair skating coach. In addition, he became an ISU technical specialist for Canada and was formerly the pair skating director at the BC Centre of Excellence in Vancouver. He initially coached at the C.P.A. Saint-Léonard Inc. in Montreal alongside Richard Gauthier until 2019, when it was announced that he had moved to Oakville, Ontario, to coach at the Skate Oakville Skating Club with wife, Meagan Duhamel.

His current and former students include:

- (Australia) Ekaterina Alexandrovskaya / Harley Windsor
- (Canada) Tilda Alteryd / Gabriel Farand
- (Canada) Elladj Baldé
- (Canada) Fiona Bombardier
- (Canada) Fiona Bombardier / Gabriel Farand
- (Canada) Fiona Bombardier / Benjamin Mimar
- (United States) Marissa Castelli / Mervin Tran
- (Canada) Jazmine Desrochers / Kieran Thrasher
- (Canada) Meagan Duhamel / Eric Radford
- (Canada) Liam Firus
- (Spain) Isabella Gamez / Tòn Cónsul
- (Canada) Vanessa Grenier / Maxime Deschamps
- (United States) Ellie Kam / Danny O'Shea
- (South Korea) Kim Kyu-eun / Alex Kang-chan Kam
- (Japan) Ami Koga / Francis Boudreau-Audet
- (Japan) Ami Koga / Spencer Akira Howe
- (United States) Chelsea Liu / Ryan Bedard
- (Italy) Valentina Marchei / Ondrej Hotarek
- (Canada) Lori-Ann Matte / Thierry Ferland
- (Japan) Riku Miura / Shoya Ichihashi
- (Japan) Riku Miura / Ryuichi Kihara
- (Canada) Kirsten Moore-Towers / Michael Marinaro
- (Japan) Yuna Nagaoka / Sumitada Moriguchi
- (Canada) Chloe Panetta / Kieran Thrasher
- (Spain) Brooke McIntosh / Marco Zandron
- (Japan) Haruna Murakami / Sumitada Moriguchi
- (Canada) Natasha Purich / Mervin Tran
- (Canada) Natasha Purich / Andrew Wolfe
- (Austria) Sophia Schaller / Livio Mayr
- (Japan) Sae Shimizu / Lucas Tsuyoshi Honda
- (United States) Audrey Shin / Balázs Nagy
- (Japan) Narumi Takahashi / Mervin Tran
- (Netherlands) Niki Wories
- (United Kingdom) Caitlin Yankowskas / Hamish Gaman
- (Spain) Megan Yudin / Patrizio Romano Rossi Lopez
- (Czech Republic) Jelizaveta Žuková / Martin Bidař

== Programs ==
(with Marcoux)

Season	Short program	Free skating
2001–2002	Sweet Dreams: The Anthology by Roy Buchanan	Beyond the Forest by Max Steiner performed by National Philharmonic Orchestra

== Competitive highlights ==
GP: Grand Prix

=== With Marcoux ===
International
Event	2000–01	2001–02
World Championships		12th
Four Continents Champ.		4th
GP Cup of Russia		7th
GP Trophée Lalique	7th	
GP Sparkassen Cup on Ice	6th	5th
Nebelhorn Trophy	1st	
National
Canadian Champ.	4th	4th

=== With Micallef ===
International
Event	95–96	96–97	97–98	98–99
GP Cup of Russia				7th
GP NHK Trophy				WD
Golden Spin				1st
Nebelhorn Trophy		4th		
National
Canadian Champ.	6th	12th	5th	4th

=== With Coulombe ===
International
Event	1992–93	1993–94
International St. Gervais		3rd
Nebelhorn Trophy		5th
International: Junior
World Junior Championships	3rd	
