= Grayson Long =

Canadian figure skater (born 2007)

Personal information
- Born: October 30, 2007 (age 19) Oakville, Ontario, Canada
- Home town: Toronto, Ontario, Canada
- Height: 1.83 m (6 ft 0 in)

Figure skating career
- Country: Canada
- Coach: Benoît Richaud; Leonid Sviridenko; Andrew Evans
- Began skating: 2013

Grayson Long (born 30 October 2007) is a Canadian figure skater.

== Career ==
=== Early career ===
Long came runner-up to the Canadian Junior Figure Skating Championships two times, in 2022 and 2023.

He achieved his first top-three international juniors finish in the Cranberry Cup International.

=== 2025–26 season ===
He got his first Junior Grand Prix podium in JGP Latvia, where he came second. Long came runner-up to the Cranberry Cup International and won his first overseas figure skating title in the form of the Bavarian Open. He made his international senior debut in the Ice Challenge and finished third.

== Personal life ==
He is friends with Rio Nakata.

== Competitive highlights ==
- JGP – Event of the ISU Junior Grand Prix
- TBD – Assigned
- WD – Withdrew from competition

Competition placements at senior level
Season	2024–25	2025–26
Canadian Championships	4th	11th
Ice Challenge		3rd

Competition placements at junior level
Season	2021–22	2022–23	2023–24	2024–25	2025–26	2026–27
Canadian Championships	2nd	2nd	7th			
JGP China						8th
JGP Latvia		12th			2nd	
JGP Thailand			9th	7th		
JGP Slovenia				7th		
JGP Turkey						9th
JGP United Arab Emirates					5th	
Cranberry Cup				3rd	2nd	3rd
Bavarian Open					1st	
