= Katherine Medland Spence =

Canadian figure skater (born 2000)

Personal information
- Born: August 5, 2000 (age 26) Ottawa, Ontario, Canada

Figure skating career
- Country: Canada
- Discipline: Women's singles
- Coach: Ken Rose; Danielle Rose; Robert O'Toole; Vesna Markovich
- Skating club: Richmond Training Centre
- Began skating: 2005

Medal record
Canadian Championships
Bronze medal – third place	2025 Laval	Singles

Katherine Medland Spence (born August 5, 2000) is a Canadian figure skater. She is the 2024 CS Warsaw Cup champion and the 2025 Canadian national bronze medalist.

== Personal life ==
Medland Spence was born on August 5, 2000, in Ottawa, Ontario, Canada. As of 2025, Medland Spence is a student at Carleton University, where she studies chemistry. In addition, she and her older sister, Elizabeth, both work as figure skating coaches at the Nepean Skating Club in Nepean, Ontario. Medland Spence also works as a coach at the Richmond Training Centre in Richmond Hill, Ontario.

== Career ==
=== Early career ===
Medland Spence began learning how to skate in 2005.

She made her national championship debut at the 2022 Canadian Championships, where she came in sixth place. The following year, she finished seventh at the 2023 Canadian Championships.

=== 2023–24 season ===
Medland Spence started the season by competing at the 2023 Cranberry Cup, where she finished in ninth place. Subsequently competing at the 2024 Canadian Championships, she ended up placing thirteenth.

Throughout the season, Medland Spence struggled with ankle, knee, hip, and back injuries.

=== 2024–25 season ===
Medland Spence made her international senior debut at age 24 at the 2024 CS Warsaw Cup. In Warsaw, Medland Spence placed first in both the short program and the free skate to unexpectedly claim the event title over Ekaterina Kurakova and Marina Piredda.

At the 2025 Canadian Championships in January, Medland Spence entered the event as a podium threat given her strong performance in Warsaw in November. She placed second in the short program, and despite falling to fourth place in the free skate, hung on to earn the bronze medal behind three-time national champion Madeline Schizas and silver medalist Sara-Maude Dupuis. Due to her performance at the national championship, Medland Spence was assigned to compete at the 2025 Four Continents Championships in Seoul alongside Schizas and Dupuis. She finished in fourteenth place.

=== 2025–26 season ===
Medland Spence faced several health-related difficulties that impacted her ability to train, including injuries to her right knee and hips, labrum tears, a lumpectomy after she found a lump on her breast, and vertigo. She was able to compete at the 2025 CS Nebelhorn Trophy in September, where she placed tenth, and she made her Grand Prix series debut at the NHK Trophy in November, where she placed eleventh.

In January, she competed at the 2026 Canadian Championships but withdrew following the short program due to suffering from a bad episode of vertigo on the day of the free skate.

== Programs ==
Season	Short program	Free skating
2025–2026	With One Look (from Sunset Boulevard) by Andrew Lloyd Webber performed by Patti LuPone choreo. by Danielle Rose	Clair de lune / Photograph by Cody Fry choreo. by Danielle Rose
2024–2025	No Time for Emotion (from Kingsman: The Golden Circle) by Henry Jackman and Matthew Margeson; Take Me Home, Country Roads performed by Louie Ashley choreo. by Julie Brault	Clair de lune / Photograph by Cody Fry choreo. by Danielle Rose

== Competitive highlights ==
- GP – Event of the ISU Grand Prix Series
- CS – Event of the ISU Challenger Series
- TBD – Assigned
- WD – Withdrew from competition

Competition placements at senior level
Season	2021–22	2022–23	2023–24	2024–25	2025–26
Four Continents Championships				14th	
Canadian Championships	6th	7th	13th	3rd	WD
GP NHK Trophy					11th
CS Nebelhorn Trophy					10th
CS Warsaw Cup				1st	
Cranberry Cup			9th		
Skate Canada Challenge	6th	11th	12th		

== Detailed results ==
ISU personal best scores in the +5/-5 GOE System
Segment	Type	Score	Event
Total	TSS	181.89	2024 CS Warsaw Cup
Short program	TSS	60.03	2024 CS Warsaw Cup
Short program	TES	32.83	2024 CS Warsaw Cup
Short program	PCS	27.20	2024 CS Warsaw Cup
Free skating	TSS	121.86	2024 CS Warsaw Cup
Free skating	TES	64.32	2024 CS Warsaw Cup
Free skating	PCS	57.54	2024 CS Warsaw Cup

=== Senior results ===
Results in the 2021–22 season
Date	Event	SP		FS		Total	
Date	Event	P	Score	P	Score	P	Score
Dec 1–5, 2021	2021 Skate Canada Challenge	12	48.13	5	103.26	6	151.39
Jan 7–13, 2022	(Canada) 2022 Canadian Championships	7	55.74	7	102.65	6	158.39

Results in the 2022–23 season
Date	Event	SP		FS		Total	
Date	Event	P	Score	P	Score	P	Score
Nov 30 – Dec 1, 2022	2022 Skate Canada Challenge	14	50.29	11	93.98	11	144.27
Jan 9–14, 2023	(Canada) 2023 Canadian Championships	7	54.29	5	105.19	7	159.48

Results in the 2023–24 season
Date	Event	SP		FS		Total	
Date	Event	P	Score	P	Score	P	Score
Aug 10–14, 2023	(Canada) 2023 Cranberry Cup	10	48.52	8	93.76	9	142.28
Nov 29 – Dec 3, 2023	2023 Skate Canada Challenge	10	51.85	14	94.32	12	146.17
Jan 8–14, 2024	(Canada) 2024 Canadian Championships	16	41.71	11	94.03	13	135.74

Results in the 2024–25 season
Date	Event	SP		FS		Total	
Date	Event	P	Score	P	Score	P	Score
Nov 20–24. 2024	(Poland) 2024 CS Warsaw Cup	1	60.03	1	121.86	1	181.89
Jan 14–19, 2025	(Canada) 2025 Canadian Championships	2	61.99	4	119.56	3	181.55
Feb 19–23, 2025	(South Korea) 2025 Four Continents Championships	14	53.02	14	103.93	14	156.95

Results in the 2025–26 season
Date	Event	SP		FS		Total	
Date	Event	P	Score	P	Score	P	Score
Sep 25–27, 2025	(Germany) 2025 CS Nebelhorn Trophy	9	54.16	10	97.41	10	151.57
Nov 7–9, 2025	(Japan) 2025 NHK Trophy	11	48.42	11	98.21	11	146.63
Jan 5–11, 2026	(Canada) 2026 Canadian Championships	10	56.98	—N/a	—N/a	WD	—N/a
