= Peter Beaumont (figure skater) =

Canadian figure skater (born 2001)

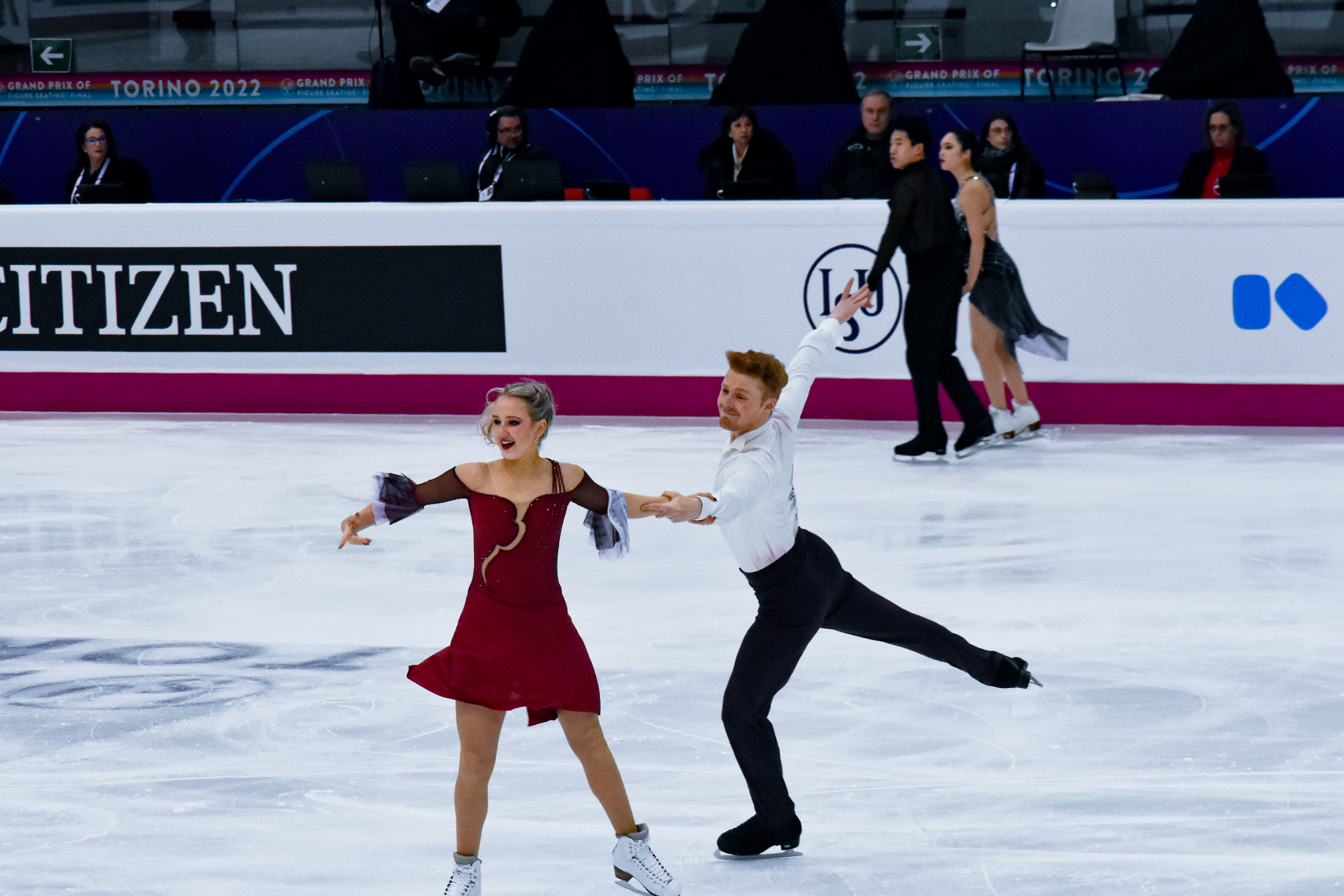
- Bashynska/Beaumont at the 2022–23 Junior Grand Prix Final

Personal information
- Born: July 24, 2001 (age 25) Rotherham, England
- Height: 1.80 m (5 ft 11 in)

Figure skating career
- Country: Canada (since 2017); Great Britain (until 2017)
- Partner: Amanda Urban (since 2025); Nadiia Bashynska (2018–25); Mia Jowitt (2015–17)
- Coach: Carol Lane; Jon Lane; Juris Razgulajevs
- Skating club: Scarboro FSC
- Began skating: 2009
Medal record
Figure skating: Ice dance
Representing Canada
World Junior Championships
Bronze medal – third place	2022 Tallinn	Ice dance
Bronze medal – third place	2023 Calgary	Ice dance
Junior Grand Prix Final
Gold medal – first place	2022–23 Turin	Ice dance

Peter Beaumont (born July 24, 2001) is an English ice dancer, who competes internationally for Canada. With former skating partner, Nadiia Bashynska, he is a two-time World Junior bronze medalist (2022, 2023), 2022–23 Junior Grand Prix Final champion, a four-time ISU Junior Grand Prix medallist, and the 2023 Canadian Junior champion.

Beaumont formerly skated for Great Britain with partner Mia Jowitt, and was the 2015 British novice ice dance champion.

== Personal life ==
Beaumont was born in Rotherham, England.

== Skating career ==
=== Early career ===
After starting to learn to skate in 2009, Beaumont competed in the United Kingdom as both a singles skater and an ice dancer. In singles, he won the silver medal at the 2015 British Novice Championships. His first ice dance partnership was with Mia Jowitt, and together they won the 2015 British novice title, and the bronze medal at the 2016 British Junior Championships. Jowitt/Beaumont ended their partnership in the 2016–17 season.

Beaumont moved to train in Toronto under coaches Carol and Jon Lane and Juris Razgulajevs, having been put in touch with them via one of his British coaches, Vivienne Dean. He began skating with Ukrainian-Canadian dancer Nadiia Bashynska in January 2017, representing Canada.

=== Partnership with Nadiia Bashynska ===
==== 2017–18 season: Debut of Bashynska/Beaumont ====
Bashynska and Beaumont began competing together domestically, winning the silver medal at the 2018 Skate Canada Challenge's novice division. This qualified them to the 2022 Canadian Novice Championships, where they won the gold medal. Based on this, they were given their first international assignment to the advanced novice competition at the Egna Trophy in Val Gardena. Third after the short dance, they rose to second overall in the free dance. Beaumont said that they were both "really thankful for the opportunity to skate abroad."

==== 2018–19 season: JGP debut ====
Moving up to the junior level, Bashynska/Beaumont were fifth at the Lake Placid Ice Dance International in New York. They were assigned to make their Junior Grand Prix debut at the 2018 JGP Slovakia in Bratislava. Placing ninth in the rhythm dance, they were fifth in the free dance despite an audience member throwing a stuffed toy onto the ice midway through the program, requiring them to adjust where they were going. They remained ninth overall.

Thirteenth at Skate Canada Challenge, they finished the season competing at the 2019 Canadian Junior Championships, where they were tenth.

==== 2019–20 season: First JGP medal ====
Bashynska/Beaumont returned to Lake Placid Ice Dance International to start the season, winning the gold medal. They were assigned to two events on the Junior Grand Prix, beginning with the 2019 JGP Russia in Chelyabinsk. They set personal bests in all three programs, finishing third in the rhythm dance, fifth in the free dance, and taking the bronze medal overall. Bashysnka and Beaumont were the only non-Russian medallists in any discipline in Chelyabinsk. Bashynska noted that the well-attended Russian event was the largest audience they had ever performed in front of. They were fourth at their second event, the 2019 JGP Croatia.

Winning silver medals at both Skate Canada Challenge and the 2020 Canadian Junior Championships, Bashynska Beaumont were next assigned to the Bavarian Open along with the other three top Canadian junior dance teams to determine which would attend the 2020 World Junior Championships. They performed poorly at the event, finishing ninth overall and last among the Canadian teams, and as such their season concluded.

==== 2020–21 season ====
With the COVID-19 pandemic severely constraining competitions, both the ISU Junior Grand Prix and the 2021 World Junior Championships were cancelled. As well, in-person domestic competition was limited, as a result of which Bashynska/Beaumont competed only once during the season, at a virtually-held 2021 Skate Canada Challenge. They won the bronze medal. The 2021 Canadian Junior Championships were subsequently cancelled.

=== 2021–22 season: World Junior bronze ===
With the resumption of the Junior Grand Prix, Bashynska/Beaumont returned to international competition at the 2021 JGP Russia in Krasnoyarsk. They finished fourth, less than three points back of third. Bashynska said that they were satisfied with their performance overall, but needed to address some technical issues. Weeks later at their second event, the 2021 JGP Austria in Linz, they initially placed fourth in the rhythm dance. Third in the free dance, they rose to third overall to win their second JGP bronze medal. Beaumont said that going into the free dance they "had the mindset that we've moved up in the standings before and we can do it again."

Bashynska/Beaumont won the gold medal at the 2021 Skate Canada Challenge. Entering the 2022 Canadian Junior Championships in Ottawa, they were second in both programs to take their second consecutive national silver medal.

Due to the pandemic, the 2022 World Junior Championships could not be held as scheduled in Sofia in early March, and as a result were rescheduled for Tallinn in mid-April. The event was further upended when Bashynska's birth country of Ukraine was invaded by Russia. Bashynska and Beaumont's free program for the season had been a medley of Russian folk songs, including the military-themed "Katyusha", which Bashynska would later say "was very close to me" as she felt "it unites our two Nations to show nothing but love." In light of the invasion, she said "now I don't think I'll be able to forgive or ever compare these two countries ever again. I'm Ukrainian and will always be." The team revived their previous seasons' free dance to "Caruso" and "And the Waltz Goes On" for the rest of the season.

As a result of the invasion, the International Skating Union banned all Russian and Belarusian athletes from participating in competitions, which had a significant impact on the junior dance field. The North American dance teams were viewed as favourites to dominate the podium, though Bashynska/Beaumont were not considered among the very top contenders going in compared to their compatriots D'Alessandro/Waddell and Americans Wolfkostin/Chen and Brown/Brown. In the rhythm dance, they scored 63.45 points, finishing narrowly in third place, 0.15 points behind D'Alessandro/Waddell in second, while the Browns were solidly in first place with 66.98. Wolfkostin/Chen were distantly in ninth after she fell on her twizzle sequence. Beaumont said that "coming to this competition, we didn't have any expectations as a team. We just wanted to enjoy it and let our skating speak for itself." In the free dance they lost points when their rotational lift was graded as only level 1, placing fifth in that segment, but remained in third place overall, 0.37 points ahead of Wolfkostin/Chen. They won the bronze medal, saying they were "overjoyed" with the result.

==== 2022–23 season: JGP Final gold ====
Bashynska and Beaumount were initially scheduled to begin their final junior season at the Armenian stop on the Junior Grand Prix circuit. However, when that was cancelled as a result of the September conflict between Azerbaijan and Armenia, they were reassigned elsewhere. Instead, their first event was the first of two Polish Junior Grand Prixes held in Gdańsk. They won the gold medal there, setting three new personal best scores. Bashynska commented on the delay, saying "we're pretty lucky that we motivate each other every day. So even when we found out about the cancellation we were able to push through and keep sharp for this competition." Competing at the second Polish event the following weekend, they won their second gold medal, improving their rhythm dance and total scores and securing qualification to the Junior Grand Prix Final.

At the Junior Grand Prix Final in Turin, Bashynska/Beaumont finished first in the rhythm dance after pre-event favourites Mrázková/Mrázek of the Czech Republic had a double-fall in their Argentine tango pattern dance. They won the free dance as well, taking the gold medal and becoming the first Canadian dancers to medal at the event since Tessa Virtue and Scott Moir in 2005. Bashynska remarked that "we were aiming to win obviously, but actually winning is like 'Oh my gosh' I don't know how else to describe. It feels surreal." Both noted that the World Junior Championships were being held in Calgary at the end of the season, saying they were looking forward to trying to win that title on home soil. Their training mates Piper Gilles and Paul Poirier won gold in the senior Grand Prix Final on the same day.

Heavy favourites for the national title going in, they broke Lajoie/Lagha's national junior records at the 2023 Canadian Junior Championships and took the gold medal. They were subsequently named to compete at the 2023 World Junior Championships.

At the World Junior Championships in Calgary, Bashynska/Beaumont entered as one of the title favourites based on their season to date, but encountered problems in the rhythm dance, stumbling in the first pattern segment, on which they received only a level 1. They earned a level 2 on the second set. As a result, they finished fourth in the segment, 0.89 points behind third-place Britons Bekker/Hernandez. They skated more cleanly in the free dance, albeit with Beaumont losing a twizzle level, but rose to third place in the segment and were narrowly third overall by 0.06 points, after Bekker/Hernandez took a one-point deduction for an extended lift. They earned their second Junior World bronze. On the subject of the move to the senior level, Bashynska said they were "looking forward to showing a new side of ourselves, obviously stepping up our game."

==== 2023–24 season: Senior debut ====
For their first senior programs, Bashynska and Beaumont initially contemplated a Twilight-themed free program, and subsequently one to Ludwig Minkus' La Bayadère, both of which their coaches opposed. They ultimately agreed on a Romeo and Juliet program, incorporating music from both Nino Rota's 1968 film score and Sergei Prokofiev's 1940 ballet.

Bashynska/Beaumont made their international senior debut on the Challenger circuit at the 2023 CS Nepela Memorial, coming in seventh. She afterward said the experience was "way more satisfying than I thought it was going to be which makes me really happy that we did so well. We're learning, and this was the first year of many years ahead of us, and I think we can both agree that this is the first step towards a long process." They were invited to make their Grand Prix debut at the 2023 Grand Prix of Espoo, where they finished in eighth place. Beaumont explained afterward that the team "came here with the goal of having clean and expressive performances. We did a lot of preparation for this event – the past three weeks have been really tough, so we’re really happy with how it went this weekend."

Making their first appearance in the domestic senior category at the Skate Canada Challenge, Bashynska/Beaumont won the gold medal. Beaumont noted the proximity to the Finnish Grand Prix, saying "it was nice to come here and skate relatively clean programs," as they were "happy with how we did relative to how physically tired we are." In their senior national championship debut at the 2024 edition in Calgary, Bashynska/Beaumont were fourth in the rhythm dance, but dropped to sixth after a fall in the free dance.

==== 2024–25 season ====
Bashynska/Beaumont started the season by finishing seventh at the 2024 Lake Placid Ice International. Going on to compete on the 2024-25 ISU Challenger Series, the duo finished seventh at the 2024 Trophée Métropole Nice Côte d'Azur. Bashynska would later post a video to her YouTube channel following the event, saying that she had sprained her ankle while walking to the rink on the day of the free dance competition. At their second Challenger Series assignment, they finished twelfth at the 2024 CS Warsaw Cup in November.

At the 2025 Canadian Figure Skating Championships, Bashynska/Beaumont came ninth in the rhythm dance after a fall. They brought back their Romeo and Juliet free dance from the previous season and finished sixth in the free dance. The duo placed in seventh overall.

On March 12, 2025, Bashynska/Beaumont announced the end of their partnership via Instagram.

=== Partnership with Amanda Urban ===
==== 2025–26 season: Debut of Urban/Beaumont ====
On October 15, 2025, it was announced that Beaumont had teamed up with Amanda Urban and that the duo would be coached by Beaumont's longtime coaching team, Carol Lane and Juris Razgulajevs.

Urban/Beaumont debuted at the 2025 Skate Canada Challenge, where they finished in seventh place. In January, they competed at the 2026 Canadian Championships, finishing in twelfth place.

== Programs ==
=== Ice dance with Amanda Urban ===
Season	Rhythm dance	Free dance
2025–2026	Brighter Days by Cajmere & Dajae; 100% Pure Love by Crystal Waters choreo. by Carol Lane, Juris Razgulajevs, Alexandra Crenian	Primavera by Ludovico Einaudi choreo. by Carol Lane, Juris Razgulajevs, Alexandra Crenian

=== Ice dance with Nadiia Bashynska ===
Season	Rhythm dance	Free dance	Exhibition
2024–2025	Lady Marmalade by Labelle, Bob Crewe, & Kenny Nolan; Le Freak by Chic choreo. by Carol Lane, Juris Razgulajevs, Alexandra Crenian	Jao Geralderry (Samba 51bpm); The Bass (Chacha) by WATAZU; Rhythm Only / Come Closer To Me by Osvaldo Farrés performed by Walter Laird & Nico Gomez; Call Me Manny (from Babylon) by Justin Hurwitz choreo. by Carol Lane, Juris Razgulajevs, Alexandra Crenian; Love Theme (from Romeo and Juliet) by Nino Rota performed by String Quartet; Dance of the Knights (from Romeo and Juliet) by Sergei Prokofiev choreo. by Carol Lane, Juris Razgulajevs	
2023–2024	Never Tear Us Apart by INXS; The Wild Boys by Duran Duran choreo. by Carol Lane, Juris Razgulajevs	Love Theme (from Romeo and Juliet) by Nino Rota performed by String Quartet; Dance of the Knights (from Romeo and Juliet) by Sergei Prokofiev choreo. by Carol Lane, Juris Razgulajevs	...Baby One More Time; Circus by Britney Spears
2022–2023	Spanish Waltz: España (Waltz, Op.236) by Émile Waldteufel performed by Claudia Hirschfeld; Tango: Tango Grande (from The Great Gatsby) by Carl Davis choreo. by Carol Lane, Juris Razgulajevs, Marc-André Servant	Anna's Theme (from The Red Violin) by John Corigliano; Elegie: O doux printemps d'autrefois by Jules Massenet choreo. by Carol Lane, Juris Razgulajevs, Marc-André Servant	High Hopes by Kodaline
2021–2022	Blues: Chances Are by Johnny Mathis; Swing: Peppermint Twist by Joey Dee, Henry Glover performed by The Sweet choreo. by Carol Lane, Juris Razgulajevs, Marc-André Servant	Caruso by Lucio Dalla; And the Waltz Goes On by Anthony Hopkins performed by André Rieu choreo. by Carol Lane, Juris Razgulajevs, Marc-André Servant; Blue Shawl by Maria Lazareva; Katyusha by Matvey Blanter; Kalinka by Ivan Larionov both performed by Maria Lazareva choreo. by Carol Lane, Juris Razgulajevs, Marc-André Servant	
2019–2021	Foxtrot: Getting to Know You; Foxtrot: Shall We Dance? (from The King and I) by Richard Rodgers & Oscar Hammerstein II choreo. by Carol Lane, Juris Razgulajevs, Marc-André Servant	Caruso by Lucio Dalla; And the Waltz Goes On by Anthony Hopkins performed by André Rieu choreo. by Carol Lane, Juris Razgulajevs, Marc-André Servant	
2018–19	Tango: Carmen; Flamenco: Carmen by Georges Bizet choreo. by Carol Lane, Juris Razgulajevs	Cinderella by Patrick Doyle choreo. by Carol Lane, Juris Razgulajevs	

== Competitive highlights ==
CS: Challenger Series; GP: Grand Prix; JGP: Junior Grand Prix

=== Ice dance with Amanda Urban for Canada ===
Competition placements at senior level
Season	2025–26
Canadian Championships	12th
Skate Canada Challenge	7th

=== Ice dance with Nadiia Bashynska for Canada ===
International
Event	18–19	19–20	20–21	21–22	22–23	23–24	24–25
GP Finland						8th	
CS Nepela Memorial						7th	
CS Trophée Métropole Nice							7th
CS Warsaw Cup							12th
Lake Placid IDI						6th	7th
International: Junior
Junior Worlds				3rd	3rd		
JGP Final					1st		
JGP Austria				3rd			
JGP Croatia		4th					
JGP Poland I					1st		
JGP Poland II					1st		
JGP Russia		3rd		4th			
JGP Slovakia	9th						
Bavarian Open		9th					
Lake Placid IDI	5th	1st					
National
Canadian Champ.	10th J	2nd J	C	2nd J	1st J	6th	7th
SC Challenge	13th J	2nd J	3rd J	1st J		1st	

=== Ice dance with Mia Jowitt for Great Britain ===
International: Junior
Event	15–16	16–17
Bavarian Open	13th	
IJS Sheffield	5th	3rd
Tallinn Trophy	17th	
National
British Champ.	3rd J	

== Detailed results ==
=== Ice dance with Amanda Urban ===
Results in the 2025-26 season
Date	Event	SP		FS		Total	
Date	Event	P	Score	P	Score	P	Score
Nov 27–29, 2025	2025 Skate Canada Challenge	8	59.53	7	98.06	7	157.59
Jan 5–11, 2026	(Canada) 2026 Canadian Championships	13	54.34	12	93.38	12	147.72

=== Ice dance with Nadiia Bashynska ===
ISU personal best scores in the +5/-5 GOE System
Segment	Type	Score	Event
Total	TSS	171.61	2022 JGP Poland II
Short program	TSS	69.56	2022 JGP Poland II
Short program	TES	39.08	2022 JGP Poland II
Short program	PCS	31.20	2023 World Junior Championships
Free skating	TSS	102.99	2022 JGP Poland II
Free skating	TES	56.27	2022 JGP Poland II
Free skating	PCS	47.72	2022 JGP Poland II

2024–2025 season
Date	Event	RD	FD	Total
Jan 14–19, 2025	2025 Canadian Championships	9; 60.54	6; 102.55	7; 163.09
Nov 20–24, 2024	2024 CS Warsaw Cup	10; 65.51	13; 92.36	12; 157.87
October 16–20, 2024	2024 CS Trophée Métropole Nice Côte d'Azur	7; 60.02	8; 90.76	7; 150.78
July 30–31, 2024	2024 Lake Placid Ice Dance International	8; 66.07	7; 104.03	7; 170.10
2023–2024 season
Date	Event	RD	FD	Total
January 8–14, 2024	2024 Canadian Championships	4; 75.64	8; 99.38	6; 175.02
Nov. 30 – Dec. 3, 2023	2024 Skate Canada Challenge	1; 75.69	2; 110.27	1; 185.96
November 17–19, 2023	2023 Grand Prix of Espoo	8; 67.68	8; 100.19	8; 167.87
September 28–30, 2023	2023 CS Nepela Memorial	6; 67.25	9; 97.56	7; 164.81
August 1–2, 2023	2023 Lake Placid Ice Dance International	11; 58.72	4; 104,84	6; 163.56
2022–23 season
Date	Event	RD	FD	Total
Feb. 27 – Mar. 5, 2023	2023 World Junior Championships	4; 68.00	3; 101.13	3; 169.13
January 9–15, 2023	2023 Canadian Junior Championships	1; 73.02	1; 110.95	1; 183.97
December 8–11, 2022	2022–23 Junior Grand Prix Final	1; 67.74	1; 99.52	1; 167.26
October 5–8, 2022	2022 JGP Poland II	1; 69.56	1; 102.05	1; 171.61
Sept. 28 – Oct. 1, 2022	2022 JGP Poland I	1; 67.35	1; 102.99	1; 170.34
2021–22 season
Date	Event	RD	FD	Total
April 13–17, 2022	2022 World Junior Championships	3; 63.45	5; 94.19	3; 157.64
January 6–12, 2022	2022 Canadian Junior Championships	2; 70.66	2; 100.13	2; 170.79
December 1–5, 2021	2022 Skate Canada Challenge	1; 68.47	1; 97.25	1; 165.72
October 6–9, 2021	2021 JGP Austria	4; 60.34	3; 91.72	3; 152.06
September 15–18, 2021	2021 JGP Russia	4; 60.35	4; 97.04	4; 157.39
2020–21 season
Date	Event	RD	FD	Total
January 15–17, 2021	2021 Skate Canada Junior Challenge	3; 65.32	3; 96.91	3; 162.23
2019–20 season
Date	Event	RD	FD	Total
February 3–9, 2020	2020 Bavarian Open	7; 54.96	10; 73.22	9; 128.18
January 13–19, 2020	2020 Canadian Junior Championships	2; 63.73	1; 101.84	2; 165.57
Nov. 27 – Dec. 1, 2019	2020 Skate Canada Challenge	3; 64.99	2; 101.74	1; 166.73
September 25–28, 2019	2019 JGP Croatia	5; 58.41	5; 88.66	4; 147.07
September 11–14, 2019	2019 JGP Russia	3; 59.83	5; 89.22	3; 149.05
August 1–2, 2019	2019 Lake Placid Ice Dance International	1; 55.48	1; 84.85	1; 140.33
2018–19 season
Date	Event	RD	FD	Total
January 13–20, 2019	2019 Canadian Junior Championships	10; 52.36	10; 79.93	10; 132.29
Nov. 28 – Dec. 2, 2018	2019 Skate Canada Challenge	11; 54.35	16; 73.45	13; 127.80
August 22–25, 2018	2018 JGP Slovakia	9; 47.26	5; 77.31	9; 124.57
July 26–27, 2018	2018 Lake Placid Ice Dance International	7; 43.64	2; 78.29	5; 121.93
