= 2024 CS Warsaw Cup =

Figure skating competition

- Type: ISU Challenger Series
- Date: November 20 – 24
- Season: 2024–25
- Location: Warsaw, Poland
- Host: Polish Figure Skating Association
- Venue: Arena COS Torwar

Champions
- Men's singles: (Poland) Vladimir Samoilov
- Women's singles: (Canada) Katherine Medland Spence
- Pairs: (Georgia (country)) Anastasiia Metelkina and Luka Berulava
- Ice dance: (France) Evgeniia Lopareva and Geoffrey Brissaud
- Previous: 2023 CS Warsaw Cup
- Next: 2025 CS Warsaw Cup
- Previous CS: 2024 CS Tallinn Trophy
- Next CS: 2024 CS Golden Spin of Zagreb

The 2024 CS Warsaw Cup was held on November 20–24, 2024, in Warsaw, Poland. It was part of the 2024–25 ISU Challenger Series. Medals were awarded in men's singles, women's singles, pairs, and ice dance.

== Entries ==
The International Skating Union published the list of entries on October 29, 2024.

Country	Men	Women	Pairs	Ice dance
Australia	Douglas Gerber	—N/a		
Austria	Maurizio Zandron	—N/a	Gabriella Izzo; Luc Maierhofer	—N/a
Azerbaijan	—N/a	Nargiz Süleymanova	—N/a	
Bulgaria	Beat Schümperli	—N/a		
Bulgaria	Alexander Zlatkov	—N/a		
Canada	—N/a	Katherine Medland Spence	Fiona Bombardier; Benjamin Mimar	Nadiia Bashynska; Peter Beaumont
Canada	—N/a	Kaiya Ruiter	—N/a	Marie-Jade Lauriault; Romain Le Gac
Czech Republic	—N/a		Barbora Kucianová; Martin Bidař	—N/a
Estonia	—N/a	Eva-Lotta Kiibus	—N/a	
Estonia	—N/a	Olesja Leonova	—N/a	
Finland	Valtter Virtanen	—N/a		
France	Luc Economides	Eve Dubecq	Louise Ehrhard; Matthis Pellegris	Eva Bernard; Amedeo Bonetto
France	—N/a	Lorine Schild	Aurélie Faula; Théo Belle	Marie Dupayage; Thomas Nabais
France	—N/a	Léa Serna	—N/a	Evgenia Lopareva; Geoffrey Brissaud
Georgia	—N/a		Anastasiia Metelkina; Luka Berulava	—N/a
Germany	Kai Jagoda	—N/a	Letizia Roscher; Luis Schuster	Jennifer Janse van Rensburg; Benjamin Steffan
Great Britain	—N/a		Anastasia Vaipan-Law; Luke Digby	—N/a
Hungary	—N/a			Emese Csiszèr; Mark Shapiro
Hungary	—N/a			Lucy Hancock; Ilias Fourati
Iceland	—N/a		Júlía Sylvía Gunnarsdóttir; Manuel Piazza	—N/a
Italy	Gabriele Frangipani	Anna Pezzetta	Irma Caldara; Riccardo Maglio	Carlotta Argentieri; Francesco Riva
Italy	Matteo Nalbone	Marina Piredda	—N/a	Victoria Manni; Carlo Röthlisberger
Lithuania	—N/a	Jogailė Aglinskytė	—N/a	
Lithuania	—N/a	Aleksandra Dolinskė	—N/a	
Mongolia	—N/a	Maral-Erdene Gansukh	—N/a	
Netherlands	—N/a	Roos van der Pas	Daria Danilova; Michel Tsiba	—N/a
Poland	Jakub Lofek	Marietta Atkins	—N/a	Olexandra Borysova; Aron Freeman
Poland	Vladimir Samoilov	Karolina Białas	—N/a	Sofiia Dovhal; Wiktor Kulesza
Poland	Kornel Witkowski	Ekaterina Kurakova	—N/a	Anastasia Polibina; Pavel Golovishnikov
Poland	—N/a	Laura Szczęsna	—N/a	—N/a
Romania	—N/a	Julia Sauter	—N/a	
Serbia	—N/a	Antonina Dubinina	—N/a	
Slovakia	Lukáš Václavík	Ema Doboszová	—N/a	Mária Sofia Pucherová; Nikita Lysak
Slovakia	—N/a	Vanesa Šelmeková	—N/a	—N/a
South Korea	—N/a			Hannah Lim; Ye Quan
Spain	—N/a		Brooke McIntosh; Marco Zandron	—N/a
Sweden	—N/a			Emma Kivioja; Erik Pellnor
Sweden	—N/a			Milla Ruud Reitan; Nikolaj Majorov
Switzerland	—N/a	Livia Kaiser	Oxana Vouillamoz; Tom Bouvart	—N/a
Ukraine	Kyrylo Marsak	—N/a	Sofiia Holichenko; Artem Darenskyi	Zoe Larson; Andrii Kapran
Ukraine	Ivan Shmuratko	—N/a	—N/a	
United States	Maxim Naumov	Clare Seo	Isabelle Martins; Ryan Bedard	Eva Pate; Logan Bye
United States	—N/a	—N/a	—N/a	Emilea Zingas; Vadym Kolesnik

=== Changes to preliminary assignments ===
Date	Discipline	Withdrew	Added	Ref.
October 31	Men	(Finland) Matias Lindfors	(Italy) Corey Circelli	
October 31	Men	(United States) Ilia Malinin	(Poland) Vladimir Samoilov	
October 31	Men	—N/a	(France) Xan Rols	
October 31	Men	—N/a	(Slovakia) Adam Hagara	
October 31	Women	(Lithuania) Meda Variakojyte	(Lithuania) Aleksandra Dolinskė	
October 31	Women	(United Kingdom) Arabella Sear-Watkins	(Canada) Katherine Medland Spence	
October 31	Women	(Australia) Maria Chernyshova	(Netherlands) Roos van der Pas	
October 31	Women	(Sweden) Josefin Taljegård	—N/a	
October 31	Ice dance	(France); Eva Bernard; Amedeo Bonetto	—N/a	
November 7	Men	(France) Xan Rols	(Slovakia) Lukas Vaclavik	
November 7	Men	(Lithuania) Daniels Kockers	—N/a	
November 7	Men	(United States) Lucas Broussard	—N/a	
November 7	Women	—N/a	(Poland) Marietta Atkins	
November 7	Pairs	—N/a	(Georgia (country)); Anastasiia Metelkina; Luka Berulava	
November 7	Ice dance	(France); Natacha Lagouge; Arnaud Caffa	(France); Eva Bernard; Amedeo Bonetto	
November 14	Men	(Poland) Matvii Yefymenko	—N/a	
November 14	Men	(Sweden) Gabriel Folkesson	—N/a	
November 14	Women	(Romania) Ana-Sofia Beşchea	—N/a	
November 14	Pairs	(Australia); Anastasia Golubeva; Hektor Giotopoulos Moore	—N/a	
November 14	Pairs	(Philippines); Isabella Gamez; Aleksandr Korovin	—N/a	
November 14	Ice dance	(Australia); Holly Harris; Jason Chan	—N/a	
November 18	Pairs	(United States); Audrey Shin; Balázs Nagy	—N/a	
November 19	Men	(Italy) Corey Circelli	—N/a	
November 19	Men	(Slovakia) Adam Hagara	—N/a	
November 19	Women	(Austria) Stefanie Pesendorfer	—N/a	
November 19	Women	(Kazakhstan) Sofia Samodelkina	—N/a	
November 19	Pairs	(France); Tilda Alteryd; Noël-Antoine Pierre	—N/a	
November 19	Ice dance	(Slovakia); Anna Šimová; Kirill Aksenov	—N/a	
November 20	Women	(Germany) Kristina Isaev	—N/a	
November 20	Pairs	(Italy); Lucrezia Beccari; Matteo Guarise	—N/a	
November 20	Pairs	(Italy); Rebecca Ghilardi; Filippo Ambrosini	—N/a	

== Results ==
=== Men's singles ===
Men's results
Rank	Skater	Nation	Total points	SP		FS	
1st place, gold medalist(s)	Vladimir Samoilov	Poland	233.02	1	84.94	1	148.08
2nd place, silver medalist(s)	Gabriele Frangipani	Italy	219.94	2	78.47	2	141.47
3rd place, bronze medalist(s)	Ivan Shmuratko	Ukraine	215.74	3	78.28	5	137.46
4	Kornel Witkowski	Poland	211.05	6	70.80	4	140.25
5	Kyrylo Marsak	Ukraine	205.38	8	64.72	3	140.66
6	Luc Economides	France	204.02	4	76.03	7	127.99
7	Maurizio Zandron	Austria	201.61	7	65.88	6	135.73
8	Maxim Naumov	United States	193.69	5	75.77	12	117.92
9	Lukas Vaclavik	Slovakia	190.87	10	63.31	8	127.56
10	Matteo Nalbone	Italy	187.24	9	64.20	10	123.04
11	Valtter Virtanen	Finland	185.53	11	62.37	9	123.16
12	Jakub Lofek	Poland	178.57	14	59.87	11	118.70
13	Kai Jagoda	Germany	177.20	12	60.15	13	117.05
14	Douglas Gerber	Australia	167.03	15	55.14	14	111.89
15	Alexander Zlatkov	Bulgaria	161.70	13	60.01	15	101.69
16	Beat Schümperli	Bulgaria	147.93	16	49.43	16	98.50

=== Women's singles ===
Women's results
Rank	Skater	Nation	Total points	SP		FS	
1st place, gold medalist(s)	Katherine Medland Spence	Canada	181.89	1	60.03	1	121.86
2nd place, silver medalist(s)	Ekaterina Kurakova	Poland	171.08	4	57.87	3	113.21
3rd place, bronze medalist(s)	Marina Piredda	Italy	168.92	7	56.66	4	112.26
4	Lorine Schild	France	167.75	2	58.02	6	109.73
5	Anna Pezzetta	Italy	167.38	3	57.96	7	109.42
6	Livia Kaiser	Switzerland	166.89	5	56.98	5	109.91
7	Kaiya Ruiter	Canada	165.75	12	50.71	2	115.04
8	Léa Serna	France	161.34	6	56.85	8	104.49
9	Eva-Lotta Kiibus	Estonia	154.63	8	55.90	9	98.73
10	Ema Doboszová	Slovakia	148.00	9	55.73	12	92.27
11	Jogailė Aglinskytė	Lithuania	147.94	11	51.12	10	96.82
12	Clare Seo	United States	147.70	10	52.45	11	95.25
13	Laura Szczęsna	Poland	139.86	15	48.21	13	91.65
14	Vanesa Šelmeková	Slovakia	139.43	13	49.86	15	89.57
15	Eve Dubecq	France	136.78	16	47.03	14	89.75
16	Nargiz Süleymanova	Azerbaijan	135.15	18	46.03	16	89.12
17	Julia Sauter	Romania	133.81	17	46.12	17	87.69
18	Aleksandra Dolinskė	Lithuania	127.80	14	48.82	20	78.98
19	Marietta Atkins	Poland	123.39	20	44.10	19	79.29
20	Antonina Dubinina	Serbia	120.04	19	44.10	22	75.94
21	Karolina Białas	Poland	118.46	23	35.74	18	82.72
22	Roos van der Pas	Netherlands	113.79	22	35.99	21	77.80
23	Olesja Leonova	Estonia	90.75	21	38.40	23	52.35
24	Maral-Erdene Gansukh	Mongolia	withdrew	24	23.48	withdrew from competition	

=== Pairs ===
Ice dance results
Rank	Team	Nation	Total points	SP		FS	
1st place, gold medalist(s)	Anastasiia Metelkina; Luka Berulava	Georgia	202.03	1	67.17	1	134.86
2nd place, silver medalist(s)	Anastasia Vaipan-Law; Luke Digby	Great Britain	182.37	2	66.54	2	115.83
3rd place, bronze medalist(s)	Fiona Bombardier; Benjamin Mimar	Canada	170.51	4	56.84	3	113.67
4	Oxana Vouillamoz; Tom Bouvart	Switzerland	170.09	3	58.60	5	111.49
5	Daria Danilova; Michel Tsiba	Netherlands	166.01	6	54.21	4	111.80
6	Letizia Roscher; Luis Schuster	Germany	153.01	7	53.77	6	99.24
7	Sofiia Holichenko; Artem Darenskyi	Ukraine	151.27	5	54.45	7	96.82
8	Irma Caldara; Riccardo Maglio	Italy	137.42	9	48.97	10	88.45
9	Barbora Kucianová; Martin Bidař	Czech Republic	134.29	12	45.80	9	88.49
10	Gabriella Izzo; Luc Maierhofer	Austria	134.00	15	38.87	8	95.13
11	Brooke McIntosh; Marco Zandron	Spain	129.90	11	47.75	12	82.15
12	Júlía Sylvía Gunnarsdóttir; Manuel Piazza	Iceland	129.35	14	41.93	11	87.42
13	Isabelle Martins; Ryan Bedard	United States	126.64	8	52.01	14	74.63
14	Aurélie Faula; Théo Belle	France	125.14	13	43.95	13	81.19
15	Louise Ehrhard; Matthis Pellegris	France	120.04	10	48.75	15	71.29

=== Ice dance ===
Ice dance results
Rank	Team	Nation	Total points	RD		FD	
1st place, gold medalist(s)	Evgeniia Lopareva; Geoffrey Brissaud	France	201.89	1	80.36	1	121.53
2nd place, silver medalist(s)	Emilea Zingas; Vadym Kolesnik	United States	196.07	2	77.20	2	118.87
3rd place, bronze medalist(s)	Hannah Lim; Ye Quan	South Korea	185.62	4	74.11	3	111.51
4	Eva Pate; Logan Bye	United States	184.41	5	73.63	5	110.78
5	Marie-Jade Lauriault; Romain Le Gac	Canada	179.27	7	67.94	4	111.33
6	Jennifer Janse van Rensburg; Benjamin Steffan	Germany	171.67	3	74.88	11	96.79
7	Victoria Manni; Carlo Röthlisberger	Italy	170.75	6	68.88	7	101.87
8	Zoe Larson; Andrii Kapran	Ukraine	169.28	8	67.23	6	102.05
9	Milla Ruud Reitan; Nikolaj Majorov	Sweden	167.25	11	65.47	8	101.78
10	Mária Sofia Pucherová; Nikita Lysak	Slovakia	165.87	12	64.30	9	101.57
11	Marie Dupayage; Thomas Nabais	France	162.85	9	65.89	10	96.96
12	Nadiia Bashynska; Peter Beaumont	Canada	157.87	10	65.51	13	92.36
13	Sofiia Dovhal; Wiktor Kulesza	Poland	153.25	13	57.94	12	95.31
14	Emese Csiszèr; Mark Shapiro	Hungary	147.45	14	56.84	16	90.61
15	Carlotta Argentieri; Francesco Riva	Italy	146.96	15	55.72	15	90.74
16	Lucy Hancock; Ilias Fourati	Hungary	146.46	15	55.72	15	90.74
17	Eva Bernard; Amedeo Bonetto	France	139.61	19	52.12	17	87.49
18	Anastasia Polibina; Pavel Golovishnikov	Poland	135.24	18	54.96	18	80.28
19	Emma Kivioja; Erik Pellnor	Sweden	132.16	16	55.38	20	76.78
20	Olexandra Borysova; Aron Freeman	Poland	130.05	20	51.57	19	78.48
