= 2023 Canadian Figure Skating Championships =

Canadian figure skating competition

2023 Canadian National Skating Championships
- Type: National championship
- Date: January 9–15
- Season: 2022–23
- Location: Oshawa, Ontario
- Host: Skate Canada
- Venue: Tribute Communities Centre

Champions
- Men's singles: Keegan Messing (S); Edward Nicholas Vasii (J)
- Women's singles: Madeline Schizas (S); Hetty Shi (J)
- Pairs: Deanna Stellato-Dudek / Maxime Deschamps (S); Chloe Panetta / Kieran Thrasher (J)
- Ice dance: Laurence Fournier Beaudry / Nikolaj Sørensen (S); Nadiia Bashynska / Peter Beaumont (J)
- Previous: 2022 Canadian Championships
- Next: 2024 Canadian Championships

The 2023 Canadian Figure Skating Championships were held on January 9-15, 2023 in Oshawa, Ontario. Medals were awarded in men's singles, women's singles, pair skating, and ice dance at the senior, junior, and novice levels. The results were part of the Canadian selection criteria for the 2023 World Championships, the 2023 Four Continents Championships, and the 2023 World Junior Championships.

Oshawa was announced as the host in April 2022. The city hosted the event once before in 1952. Competitors qualified at the Skate Canada Challenge in December.

== Entries ==
A list of entries was posted prior to the competition.

=== Senior ===
Men	Women	Pairs	Ice dance
Gabriel Blumenthal	Arianne Belley	Tilda Alteryd / Gabriel Farand	Emmy Bronsard / Jacob Richmond
Wesley Chiu	Fiona Bombardier	Émy Carignan / Bryan Pierro	Mikala Cutler / Mackenzie Mah
Corey Circelli	Sara-Maude Dupuis	Caidence Derenisky / Raine Eberl	Laurence Fournier Beaudry / Nikolaj Sørensen
Maskim Chelmaev	Audréanne Foster	Summer Homick / Marty Haubrich	Lily Hensen / Nathan Lickers
Beres Clements	Nour-Houda Foura	Kelly Ann Laurin / Loucas Éthier	Marjorie Lajoie / Zachary Lagha
Jack Dushenski	Grace Johnson	Brooke McIntosh / Benjamin Mimar	Molly Lanaghan / Dmitre Razgulajevs
Stephen Gogolev	Katherine Karon	Lia Pereira / Trennt Michaud	Miku Makita / Tyler Gunara
Alec Guinzbourg	Julianne Lussier	Emmanuelle Proft / Nicolas Nadeau	Marie-Jade Lauriault / Romain Le Gac
Antoine Goyette	Cristina Lyons	Deanna Stellato-Dudek / Maxime Deschamps	Haley Sales / Nikolas Wamsteeker
Matthew Markell	Katherine Medland Spence	—N/a	Carolane Soucisse / Shane Firus
Keegan Messing	Justine Miclette	—N/a	Alyssa Robinson / Jacob Portz
Matthew Newnham	Natalie Roccatani	—N/a	—N/a
Conrad Orzel	Lia Pereira	—N/a	—N/a
Aleksa Rakic	Marie Maude Pomerleau	—N/a	—N/a
Roman Sadovsky	Kaiya Ruiter	—N/a	—N/a
Marek Simon Ramilison	Madeline Schizas	—N/a	—N/a
Bennet Toman	Amanda Tobin	—N/a	—N/a
Bruce Waddell	Amy Shao Ning Yang	—N/a	—N/a

=== Junior ===
Men	Women	Pairs	Ice dance
David Bondar	Abbie Baltzer	Jazmine Desrochers / Aidan Wright	Nadiia Bashynska / Peter Beaumont
Anson Chung	Breken Brezden	Ava Kemp / Yohnatan Elizarov	Lauren Batka / Jacob Yang
Jacob Cote	Mia Clarke	Martina Ariano Kent / Alexis Leduc	Nicole Bolender / Aiden Dotzert
Jackson Ellis	Marie-France D`Amour	Chloe Panetta / Kieran Thrasher	Erica Estepa / Nolen Hickey
Jake Ellis	Angelina YinLin Guan	Ashlyn Schmitz / Tristan Taylor	Éliane Foroglou-Gadoury / Félix Desmarais
Terry Yu Tao Jin	Paulina Grant	—N/a	Sandrine Gauthier / Quentin Thieren
Etienne Lacasse	Fée Ann Landry	—N/a	Kaitlyn Ho / Daniel Yu
Shohei Law	Lulu Lin	—N/a	Alisa Korneva / Kieran MacDonald
David Li	Tian Qing	—N/a	Jordyn Lewis / Noah McMillan
Grayson Long	Alys Rajotte	—N/a	Savanna Martel / Kobi Chant
Rio Morita	Reese Rose	—N/a	Dana Sabatini-Speciale / Nicholas Buelow
Anthony Paradis	Elisha Ryu	—N/a	Layla Veillon / Alexander Brandys
Evan Prosserman	Marie-Raphaële Savoie	—N/a	—N/a
David Shteyngart	Hetty Shi	—N/a	—N/a
Neo Tran	Rose Théroux	—N/a	—N/a
Edward Nicholas Vasii	Aleksa Volkova	—N/a	—N/a
Brendan Wong	Kara Yun	—N/a	—N/a
—N/a	Megan Woodley	—N/a	—N/a

== Medal summary ==
=== Senior ===
Discipline	Gold	Silver	Bronze
Men	Keegan Messing	Conrad Orzel	Wesley Chiu
Women	Madeline Schizas	Kaiya Ruiter	Fiona Bombardier
Pairs	Deanna Stellato-Dudek / Maxime Deschamps	Brooke McIntosh / Benjamin Mimar	Lia Pereira / Trennt Michaud
Ice dance	Laurence Fournier Beaudry / Nikolaj Sørensen	Marjorie Lajoie / Zachary Lagha	Marie-Jade Lauriault / Romain Le Gac

=== Junior ===
Discipline	Gold	Silver	Bronze
Men	Edward Nicholas Vasii	Grayson Long	Anthony Paradis
Women	Hetty Shi	Rose Théroux	Aleksa Volkova
Pairs	Chloe Panetta / Kieran Thrasher	Ava Kemp / Yohnatan Elizarov	Martina Ariano Kent / Alexis Leduc
Ice dance	Nadiia Bashynska / Peter Beaumont	Sandrine Gauthier / Quentin Thieren	Hailey Yu / Brendan Giang

== Senior results ==
=== Men's singles ===
Rank	Name	Total points	SP		FS	
1	Keegan Messing	257.78	1	94.40	2	163.38
2	Conrad Orzel	237.46	2	86.16	4	151.30
3	Wesley Chiu	226.15	11	65.44	3	160.71
4	Stephen Gogolev	220.13	17	49.97	1	170.16
5	Corey Circelli	212.33	5	75.73	6	136.60
6	Matthew Newnham	211.33	3	79.75	8	131.58
7	Beres Clements	208.19	4	75.95	7	132.24
8	Roman Sadovsky	206.86	13	61.48	5	145.38
9	Jack Dushenski	195.09	9	69.87	9	125.22
10	Bennet Toman	193.43	8	70.33	11	123.10
11	Matthew Markell	193.27	6	74.12	13	119.15
12	Aleksa Rakic	185.77	10	68.51	14	117.26
13	Alec Guinzbourg	183.94	12	61.94	12	122.00
14	Gabriel Blumenthal	183.80	14	59.31	10	124.49
15	Bruce Waddell	176.39	7	70.37	15	106.02
16	Marek Ramilison	157.22	16	56.53	16	100.69
17	Maksim Chelmaev	148.26	15	56.59	17	91.67
18	Antoine Goyette	115.67	18	37.46	18	78.21

=== Women's singles ===
Rank	Name	Total points	SP		FS	
1	Madeline Schizas	196.47	1	68.32	2	128.15
2	Kaiya Ruiter	189.36	6	59.54	1	129.82
3	Fiona Bombardier	180.54	3	60.52	3	120.02
4	Sara-Maude Dupuis	169.56	4	60.33	4	109.23
5	Lia Pereira	165.83	2	61.21	7	104.62
6	Justine Miclette	162.95	5	60.14	8	102.81
7	Katherine Medland Spence	159.48	7	54.29	5	105.19
8	Amanda Tobin	158.07	9	53.13	6	104.94
9	Natalie Roccatani	155.50	8	53.74	10	101.76
10	Marie Maude Pomerleau	155.23	10	52.87	9	102.36
11	Audréanne Foster	152.72	12	51.34	11	101.38
12	Julianne Lussier	147.13	14	50.99	12	96.14
13	Amy Shao Ning Yang	142.66	11	52.22	13	90.44
14	Katherine Karon	139.06	13	50.99	14	88.07
15	Nour-Houda Foura	137.11	15	49.27	15	87.84
16	Grace Johnson	130.33	16	46.91	16	83.42
17	Cristina Lyons	120.29	17	46.64	17	73.65
18	Arianne Belley	112.07	18	39.75	18	72.32

=== Pairs ===
Rank	Name	Total points	SP		FS	
1	Deanna Stellato-Dudek / Maxime Deschamps	199.18	1	73.20	1	125.98
2	Brooke McIntosh / Benjamin Mimar	187.26	2	66.67	2	120.59
3	Lia Pereira / Trennt Michaud	176.53	4	64.60	3	111.93
4	Kelly Ann Laurin / Loucas Éthier	175.27	3	65.61	4	109.66
5	Emmanuelle Proft / Nicolas Nadeau	164.81	6	57.74	5	107.07
6	Caidence Derenisky / Raine Eberl	162.19	5	59.12	6	103.07
7	Summer Homick / Marty Haubrich	150.35	7	51.10	7	99.25
8	Tilda Alteryd / Gabriel Farand	146.26	9	47.15	8	99.11
9	Émy Carignan / Bryan Pierro	138.53	8	48.84	9	89.69

=== Ice dance ===
Rank	Name	Total points	RD		FD	
1	Laurence Fournier Beaudry / Nikolaj Sørensen	212.40	1	87.06	2	125.34
2	Marjorie Lajoie / Zachary Lagha	211.80	2	84.91	1	126.89
3	Marie-Jade Lauriault / Romain Le Gac	196.40	3	77.34	3	119.06
4	Carolane Soucisse / Shane Firus	181.00	4	72.74	5	108.26
5	Haley Sales / Nikolas Wamsteeker	180.76	5	69.12	4	111.64
6	Molly Lanaghan / Dmitre Razgulajevs	172.60	6	68.38	6	104.22
7	Lily Hensen / Nathan Lickers	167.75	7	67.91	7	99.84
8	Miku Makita / Tyler Gunara	164.63	8	67.11	8	97.52
9	Emmy Bronsard / Jacob Richmond	154.09	9	63.99	9	90.10
10	Alyssa Robinson / Jacob Portz	145.23	10	58.09	10	87.14
11	Mikala Cutler / Mackenzie Mah	130.22	11	50.81	11	79.41

== Junior results ==
=== Men's singles ===
Rank	Name	Total points	SP		FS	
1	Edward Nicholas Vasii	191.00	2	67.78	2	123.22
2	Grayson Long	178.93	1	68.51	5	110.42
3	Anthony Paradis	178.90	12	50.42	1	128.48
4	Rio Morita	172.72	5	61.69	3	111.03
5	David Li	169.86	6	59.31	4	110.55
6	David Shteyngart	167.31	4	61.82	7	105.49
7	Terry Yu Tao Jin	163.76	7	58.93	8	104.83
8	Shohei Law	163.08	3	63.35	10	99.73
9	Jake Ellis	156.83	10	55.84	9	100.99
10	Brendan Wong	156.10	13	49.94	6	106.16
11	Evan Prosserman	149.02	11	54.03	11	94.99
12	Neo Tran	145.73	9	56.60	13	89.13
13	David Bondar	145.26	8	57.68	14	87.58
14	Jackson Ellis	138.65	14	49.24	12	89.41
15	Damien Bueckert	128.42	15	48.54	16	79.88
16	Jacob Cote	127.92	17	43.80	15	84.12
17	Etienne Lacasse	116.14	16	45.24	17	70.90
18	Anson Chung	109.82	18	41.23	18	68.59

=== Women's singles ===
Rank	Name	Total points	SP		FS	
1	Hetty Shi	165.61	1	62.35	1	103.26
2	Rose Théroux	159.13	4	59.33	3	99.80
3	Aleksa Volkova	155.40	3	59.35	5	96.05
4	Kara Yun	153.98	7	52.03	2	101.95
5	Megan Woodley	147.90	8	51.49	4	96.41
6	Reese Rose	147.78	6	52.23	6	95.55
7	Breken Brezden	147.70	5	56.06	7	91.64
8	Lulu Lin	145.55	2	60.59	12	84.96
9	Abbie Baltzer	137.34	10	50.25	8	87.09
10	Elisha Ryu	136.95	9	50.44	11	86.51
11	Mia Clarke	136.04	12	49.14	9	86.90
12	Alys Rajotte	129.86	16	43.10	10	86.76
13	Angelina YinLin Guan	129.34	11	49.79	15	79.55
14	Fée Ann Landry	129.01	13	48.18	14	80.83
15	Marie-Raphaële Savoie	120.17	15	44.86	16	75.31
16	Marie-France D`Amour	119.88	17	38.40	13	81.48
17	Tian Qing	115.40	14	47.55	18	67.85
18	Paulina Grant	109.55	18	37.62	17	71.93

=== Pairs ===
Rank	Name	Total points	SP		FS	
1	Chloe Panetta / Kieran Thrasher	147.84	1	52.48	1	95.36
2	Ava Kemp / Yohnatan Elizarov	127.52	2	49.87	3	77.65
3	Martina Ariano Kent / Alexis Leduc	119.41	4	40.93	2	78.48
4	Ashlyn Schmitz / Tristan Taylor	117.32	3	47.35	4	69.97
5	Jazmine Desrochers / Aidan Wright	93.53	5	32.43	5	61.10

=== Ice dance ===
Rank	Name	Total points	RD		FD	
1	Nadiia Bashynska / Peter Beaumont	183.97	1	73.02	1	110.95
2	Sandrine Gauthier / Quentin Thieren	161.52	2	65.04	2	96.48
3	Hailey Yu / Brendan Giang	154.70	3	61.27	3	93.43
4	Jordyn Lewis / Noah McMillan	147.46	6	56.34	4	91.12
5	Layla Veillon / Alexander Brandys	145.09	5	57.57	5	87.52
6	Dana Sabatini-Speciale / Nicholas Buelow	144.93	4	58.40	6	86.53
7	Alisa Korneva / Kieran MacDonald	132.61	8	48.98	7	83.63
8	Éliane Foroglou-Gadoury / Félix Desmarais	131.40	7	51.10	8	80.30
9	Erica Estepa / Nolen Hickey	122.36	12	43.58	9	78.78
10	Lauren Batka / Jacob Yang	116.30	10	47.65	11	68.65
11	Kaitlyn Ho / Daniel Yu	115.76	9	48.28	13	67.48
12	Nicole Bolender / Aiden Dotzert	115.63	11	47.20	12	68.43
13	Savanna Martel / Kobi Chant	113.08	13	42.97	10	70.11

== International team selections ==
=== Four Continents Championships ===
The 2023 Four Continents Championships were held from February 7–12 in Colorado Springs, Colorado, in the United States. Teams were selected using the International Teams Selection Criteria. The initial team selection was announced on January 15, 2023. The full list, including alternates, was published by the ISU on January 18, 2023.

	Men	Women	Pairs	Ice dance
1	Keegan Messing	Madeline Schizas	Deanna Stellato-Dudek / Maxime Deschamps	~~Piper Gilles / Paul Poirier~~ (withdrew)
2	Stephen Gogolev	Sara-Maude Dupuis	Lia Pereira / Trennt Michaud	Laurence Fournier Beaudry / Nikolaj Sørensen
3	Conrad Orzel	Justine Miclette	Kelly Ann Laurin / Loucas Éthier	Marjorie Lajoie / Zachary Lagha
Alt. 1	Corey Circelli	Gabrielle Daleman		Marie-Jade Lauriault / Romain Le Gac (called up)
Alt. 2	Beres Clements			Haley Sales / Nikolas Wamsteeker
Alt. 3	Roman Sadovsky			Carolane Soucisse / Shane Firus

=== World Junior Championships ===
The 2023 World Junior Championships were held from February 27–March 5 in Calgary, Alberta. Teams were selected using the International Teams Selection Criteria. The initial team selection was announced on January 15, 2023. The full list, including alternates, was published by the ISU on February 7, 2023.

	Men	Women	Pairs	Ice dance
1	Wesley Chiu	Kaiya Ruiter	Chloe Panetta / Kieran Thrasher	Nadiia Bashynska / Peter Beaumont
2	Aleksa Rakic		Ava Kemp / Yohnatan Elizarov	Sandrine Gauthier / Quentin Thieren
3	Edward Nicholas Vasii		Ashlyn Schmitz / Tristan Taylor	Hailey Yu / Brendan Giang
Alt. 1	Alec Guinzbourg	Fiona Bombardier		Jordyn Lewis / Noah McMillan
Alt. 2	Grayson Long	Hetty Shi		Dana Sabatini-Speciale / Nicholas Buelow
Alt. 3	Anthony Paradis			Layla Veillon / Alexander Brandys

=== World Championships ===
The 2023 World Championships were held from March 20-26 in Saitama, Japan. Teams were selected using the International Teams Selection Criteria. The initial team selection was announced on January 15, 2023. The full list, including alternates, was published by the ISU on February 28, 2023.

	Men	Women	Pairs	Ice dance
1	Keegan Messing	Madeline Schizas	Deanna Stellato-Dudek / Maxime Deschamps	Piper Gilles / Paul Poirier
2	Conrad Orzel		Brooke McIntosh / Benjamin Mimar	Laurence Fournier Beaudry / Nikolaj Sørensen
3			Lia Pereira / Trennt Michaud	
Alt. 1	Stephen Gogolev	Gabrielle Daleman	Kelly Ann Laurin / Loucas Éthier	Marjorie Lajoie / Zachary Lagha
Alt. 2	Roman Sadovsky			Marie-Jade Lauriault / Romain Le Gac
