= Andrew Evans =

Andrew or Andy Evans may refer to:

- Andrew J. Evans Jr. (1918–2001), United States Air Force general
- Andrew Evans (pastor) (1935–2023), Australian Pentecostal Christian pastor and politician
- Andy Evans (racing driver) (born 1951), American former racing driver
- Andrew Evans case, a case of wrongful conviction in the United Kingdom
- Andrew Evans, Welsh distance runner and competitor at the 1984 IAAF World Cross Country Championships
- Andy Evans (footballer) (born 1975), Welsh footballer
- Andrew Evans (travel writer) American author
- Andrew Evans (discus thrower) (born 1991), American discus thrower
- Andrew Evans (rugby union) (born 1997), South African rugby union player
