= Brooke McIntosh =

Canadian figure skater

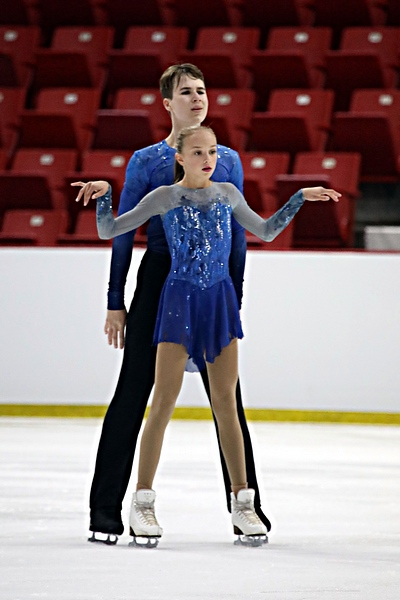
- Brooke McIntosh and Brandon Toste at the 2019 JGP United States

Personal information
- Born: January 5, 2005 (age 21)
- Home town: Toronto, Ontario, Canada
- Height: 1.67 m (5 ft 5 1/2 in)

Figure skating career
- Country: Spain (since 2024); Canada (2017–24)
- Discipline: Pair skating
- Partner: Marco Zandron (2024-25); Benjamin Mimar (2020–24); Brandon Toste (2016–20)
- Coach: Dmitri Savin; Fedor Klimov; Bruno Marcotte; Nolan Seegert
- Skating club: Canadian Ice Academy Toronto
- Began skating: 2013

Medal record
Representing Spain
Spanish Championships
Gold medal – first place	2025 Logroño	Pairs
Representing Canada
Canadian Championships
Silver medal – second place	2023 Oshawa	Pairs
World Junior Championships
Bronze medal – third place	2022 Tallinn	Pairs

Brooke McIntosh (born January 5, 2005) is a Canadian pair skater. Most recently she competed for Spain with Marco Zandron. Together, they are the 2025 Spanish national champions. In February 2025, it was announced that the team had split.

With her former partner, Benjamin Mimar, she is the 2022 NHK Trophy bronze medalist and 2023 Canadian national silver medalist.

McIntosh/Mimar are also the 2022 World Junior bronze medallists and 2022 Canadian national junior champions.

With her former skating partner, Brandon Toste, she represented Canada at the 2019 World Junior Championships, finishing in the top ten, and the 2020 Winter Youth Olympics, finishing fourth.

== Personal life ==
McIntosh was born on January 5, 2005, in Toronto, Ontario. She is the daughter of Greg McIntosh and Jill Horstead, a former competitive swimmer who competed for Canada at the 1984 Summer Olympics. McIntosh's younger sister, Summer, is also a competitive swimmer and was part of the Canadian team for the 2020 Summer Olympics and the 2024 Summer Olympics.

== Career ==
=== Partnership with Toste for Canada ===
==== 2017–18 season ====
In January 2018, McIntosh/Toste won gold in the novice division at the Canadian Championships, setting a new Canadian record (120.24).

==== 2018–19 season ====
In the 2018–2019 season, McIntosh/Toste debuted in the ISU Junior Grand Prix series. They opened the season in August at the JGP Slovakia, where they finished fifth. In September, they competed at the JGP Czech Republic, finishing tenth.

In January 2019, they won silver in the junior division at the Canadian Championships. Both also competed in the singles events (in the novice division) – McIntosh finished eighth and Toste ninth.

In March 2019, they represented Canada at the World Junior Championships, finishing tenth.

==== 2019–20 season ====
Competing on the Junior Grand Prix for their second season, McIntosh/Toste placed fifth at the 2019 JGP United States in Lake Placid and sixth at the 2019 JGP Russia in Chelyabinsk.

These results qualified a place for a Canadian junior pair team at the 2020 Winter Youth Olympics in Lausanne, and they were subsequently selected to take that spot; as a result of which, they did not attend the 2020 Canadian Junior Championships, which overlapped with the Youth Olympics. They placed fourth at the Youth Olympics in the pairs event and also placed fourth in the team competition.

Following the Youth Olympics, coach Andrew Evans announced that Toste would be retiring to focus on attending university while McIntosh would search for a new partner. A month later, Evans announced that McIntosh had formed a new partnership with Benjamin Mimar.

=== Partnership with Mimar for Canada ===
==== 2020–21 season ====
The COVID-19 pandemic shut down training centres in Ontario for several months, after which McIntosh and Mimar were added to a list of competitive skaters cleared to keep training through subsequent lockdowns.

There being no international season to speak of for Canadian skaters, McIntosh/Mimar competed as seniors on the domestic level, debuting at the Ontario Sectionals to win the gold medal. At the 2021 Skate Canada Challenge, held virtually across several hub locations to minimize gatherings, they placed fourth, qualifying to the national championships.

==== 2021–22 season ====
McIntosh and Mimar did not compete internationally on the Junior Grand Prix, debuting at and winning the 2022 Skate Canada Challenge to qualify for the 2022 Canadian Junior Championships. They also won gold there, setting a new Canadian junior pairs record for total score.

Following the junior championships, McIntosh and Mimar were sent to make their international debut at the Bavarian Open, which they won by a margin of almost twenty points, in the process acquiring the minimum technical scores necessary to attend ISU championship events. They went on to finish the season at the 2022 World Junior Championships, which had originally been scheduled to be held in Sofia in the traditional early March period. However, due to the pandemic, they were moved to mid-April in Tallinn. Due to the Russian invasion of Ukraine, the ISU banned all Russian athletes from competing, which had a significant impact on a pairs field dominated by Russia in recent years. McIntosh and Mimar placed fourth in the short program with a clean skate. They were third in the free skate, despite McIntosh falling on her triple Salchow attempt and a shaky jump combination from Mimar, and won the bronze medal overall. She said: "our program was not perfect, but we're happy that we got the medal."

==== 2022–23 season ====
With the Russian ban continuing into the new season, McIntosh and Mimar made their senior international debut in a very open pairs field. In their Challenger series debut at the 2022 Finlandia Trophy, they won the bronze medal. Mimar noted the event as a "new experience" and assessed that "our free wasn't the best we could do, after a good short, but we are still happy with third place."

McIntosh and Mimar were invited to make their Grand Prix debut at the 2022 Skate Canada International. They finished fourth in their first Grand Prix appearance, setting new personal bests in the free skate and total score. At their second assignment, the 2022 NHK Trophy in Sapporo, they placed third in the short program despite a minor throw error and set a new personal best in that segment. McIntosh said that it was a "lot of fun skating in front of the Japanese crowd." They were third in the free skate as well, despite McIntosh falling on a throw triple loop and seeming to hurt her shoulder. The team won the bronze medal, their first on the Grand Prix, with Mimar saying that he was "very proud of my partner that she fought until then end despite a fall." McIntosh subsequently said her arm had been checked by a doctor and was fine.

Shortly after the end of the Grand Prix, McIntosh and Mimar were the silver medalists at the 2022–23 Skate Canada Challenge after a rough free skate dropped them behind the new team Pereira/Michaud. They went on to win the silver medal at the 2023 Canadian Championships. Mimar said that it was the first time he had felt "really confident on the ice" with their free skate. Despite their silver medal, they were not one of the three teams selected to compete at the 2023 Four Continents Championships, though they were named to make their World Championship debut. McIntosh and Mimar finished eleventh in Saitama.

==== 2023–24 season ====
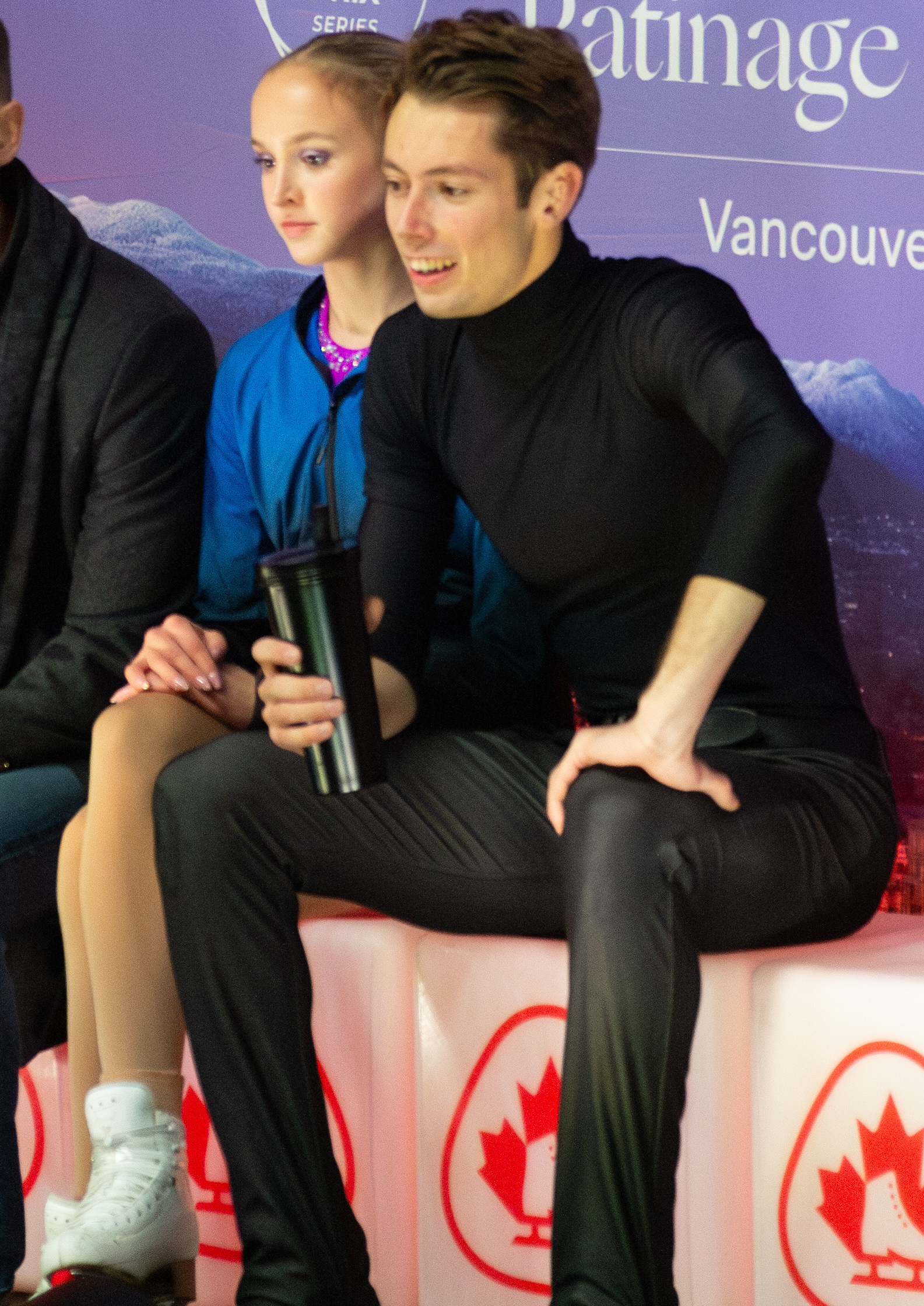
McIntosh/Mimar at the 2023 Skate Canada International

McIntosh and Mimar were hampered by injury in the lead-up to the season, being able to train heavily only in the final three weeks before their first competition, the 2023 Finlandia Trophy. They finished sixth at the event, having encountered difficulties in the free skate, including an aborted lift. Reflecting on their lack of preparation, Mimar said that "in general, we just have to keep working." On the Grand Prix, they finished sixth at the 2023 Skate Canada International. McIntosh and Mimar placed fifth in the short program at the 2023 Grand Prix of Espoo, but a difficult free skate dropped them to seventh place.

In February, it was announced that her partnership with Mimar had ended.

=== Partnership with Zandron for Spain ===
==== 2024–25 season ====
In July, it was announced that McIntosh had teamed up with Italian-Spanish skater Marco Zandron to compete for Spain. It was subsequently announced that the pair would split their time training under Nolan Seegert in Berlin, Dmitri Savin and Fedor Klimov in Sochi, and Bruno Marcotte in Oakville, Ontario. McIntosh was officially released from Skate Canada in October 2024.

McIntosh/Zandron would debut as a pair on the 2024–25 ISU Challenger Series, finishing eleventh at the 2024 CS Warsaw Cup and at the 2024 CS Golden Spin of Zagreb. In December, the pair would win the 2025 Spanish Championships. The pair were subsequently named to the 2025 World Championships team on the condition that they are able to earn the minimum technical element scores.

In February, it was announced that the team had split.

== Programs ==
=== Pair skating with Marco Zandron (for Spain) ===
Season	Short program	Free skating
2024–2025	Outro by M83 & Justin Meldal-Johnsen choreo. by Sofia Evdokimova	The Great Escape / Place de la République by Patrick Watson, Cœur de pirate, & Orchestre Métropolitain de Montréal choreo. by Mark Pillay & Paul Boll

=== Pair skating with Benjamin Mimar (for Canada) ===
Season	Short program	Free skating	Exhibition
2023–2024	Oh! Darling by The Beatles choreo. by David Wilson, Sandra Bezic	Prologue (Look Down) / At the End of the Day performed by Bournemouth Symphony Orchestra & Seann Alderking; I Dreamed a Dream performed by Susan Boyle (from Les Misérables) by Claude-Michel Schönberg & Herbert Kretzmer choreo. by Carol Lane, Juris Razgulajevs; S.O.S. d'un terrien en détresse (from Starmania) by Michel Berger performed by Ariane Moffatt, Cirque du Soleil, & Jean-Philippe Goncalves; The Firmament by Karl Hugo choreo. by Carol Lane, Juris Razgulajevs	
2022–2023	Release by Jennifer Thomas choreo. by David Wilson	Prologue (Look Down) / At the End of the Day performed by Bournemouth Symphony Orchestra & Seann Alderking; I Dreamed a Dream performed by Susan Boyle (from Les Misérables) by Claude-Michel Schönberg & Herbert Kretzmer choreo. by Carol Lane, Juris Razgulajevs	Cooler than Me by Mike Posner
2021–2022	Happy Ending by Mika choreo. by Alison Purkiss	Your Song (from Moulin Rouge!) by Elton John, Bernie Taupin performed by Ewan McGregor, Alessandro Safina choreo. by Alison Purkiss	
2020–2021	Never Tear Us Apart by INXS performed by Paloma Faith choreo. by Alison Purkiss	Your Song (from Moulin Rouge!) by Elton John, Bernie Taupin performed by Ewan McGregor, Alessandro Safina choreo. by Alison Purkiss	

=== Pair skating with Brandon Toste (for Canada) ===
Season	Short program	Free skating
2019–2020	Everybody Wants to Rule the World by Tears for Fears performed by Cinematic Pop choreo. by Mary Angela Larmer	Say Something performed by A Great Big World and Christina Aguilera choreo. by Mary Angela Larmer; Piano Fantasy by William Joseph choreo. by Mary Angela Larmer
2018–2019	Il Postino by Luis Bacalov	Piano Fantasy by William Joseph choreo. by Mary Angela Larmer

== Competitive highlights ==
- GP – Event of the ISU Grand Prix Series
- JGP – Event of the ISU Junior Grand Prix Series
- CS – Event of the ISU Challenger Series

=== Pair skating with Marco Zandron (for Spain) ===
Competition placements at senior level
Season	2024–25
Spanish Championships	1st
CS Golden Spin of Zagreb	11th
CS Warsaw Cup	11th
Merano Ice Trophy	6th

=== Pair skating with Benjamin Mimar (for Canada) ===
Competition placements at senior level
Season	2020–21	2022–23	2023–24
World Championships		11th	
Canadian Championships		2nd	
GP Finland			7th
GP NHK Trophy		3rd	
GP Skate Canada		4th	6th
CS Finlandia Trophy		3rd	6th
Skate Canada Challenge	4th	2nd	

Competition placements at junior level
Season	2021–22
World Junior Championships	3rd
Canadian Championships	1st
Bavarian Open	1st
Skate Canada Challenge	1st

=== Pair skating with Brandon Toste (for Canada) ===
Competition placements at junior level
Season	2018–19	2019–20
Winter Youth Olympics		4th
Winter Youth Olympics (Team event)		4th
World Junior Championships	10th	
Canadian Championships	2nd	
JGP Czech Republic	10th	
JGP Russia		6th
JGP Slovakia	5th	
JGP United States		5th
Skate Canada Challenge	6th	2nd

== Detailed results ==
- Small medals for the short program and free skating are only awarded at ISU Championships.

=== Pair skating with Marco Zandron (for Spain) ===
Results in the 2024–25 season
Date	Event	SP		FS		Total	
Date	Event	P	Score	P	Score	P	Score
Nov 20–24, 2024	(Poland) 2024 CS Warsaw Cup	11	47.75	12	82.15	11	129.90
Dec 4-7, 2024	(Croatia) 2024 CS Golden Spin of Zagreb	11	49.40	11	78.77	11	128.17
Dec 12-15, 2024	(Spain) 2025 Spanish Championships	1	58.13	1	105.68	1	163.81
Feb 13-16, 2025	(Italy) 2025 Merano Ice Trophy	4	51.56	6	93.37	6	144.93

=== Pair skating with Benjamin Mimar (for Canada) ===
==== Senior level ====
Results in the 2020–21 season
Date	Event	SP		FS		Total	
Date	Event	P	Score	P	Score	P	Score
Jan 8–17, 2021	2021 Skate Canada Challenge	4	55.18	3	111.51	4	166.69

Results in the 2022–23 season
Date	Event	SP		FS		Total	
Date	Event	P	Score	P	Score	P	Score
Oct 4–9, 2022	(Finland) 2022 CS Finlandia Trophy	3	61.23	4	105.38	3	166.61
Oct 28–30, 2022	2022 Skate Canada International	4	60.82	4	114.67	4	175.49
Nov 18–20, 2022	(Japan) 2022 NHK Trophy	3	62.31	3	113.34	3	175.65
Nov 30 – Dec 3, 2022	2023 Skate Canada Challenge	1	63.64	2	109.02	2	172.66
Jan 9–15, 2023	(Canada) 2023 Canadian Championships	2	66.67	2	120.59	2	187.26
Mar 20–26, 2023	(Japan) 2023 World Championships	10	63.33	11	118.62	11	181.95

Results in the 2023–24 season
Date	Event	SP		FS		Total	
Date	Event	P	Score	P	Score	P	Score
Oct 4–8, 2023	(Finland) 2022 CS Finlandia Trophy	4	58.73	6	98.77	6	157.50
Oct 27–29, 2023	2023 Skate Canada International	5	59.83	7	106.17	6	166.00
Nov 17–19, 2023	(Finland) 2023 Grand Prix of Espoo	5	56.61	8	90.66	7	147.27

==== Junior level ====
Results in the 2020–21 season
Date	Event	SP		FS		Total	
Date	Event	P	Score	P	Score	P	Score
Dec 1–5, 2022	2023 Skate Canada Challenge	1	54.75	1	97.93	1	152.68
Jan 6–12, 2022	(Canada) 2022 Canadian Championships (Junior)	1	56.91	1	99.04	1	155.95
Jan 18–23, 2022	(Germany) 2022 Bavarian Open	1	51.81	1	103.26	1	155.07
Apr 13–17, 2022	(Estonia) 2022 World Junior Championships	4	58.00	3	98.80	3	156.80
