= Benjamin Mimar =

Canadian figure skater (born 2000)

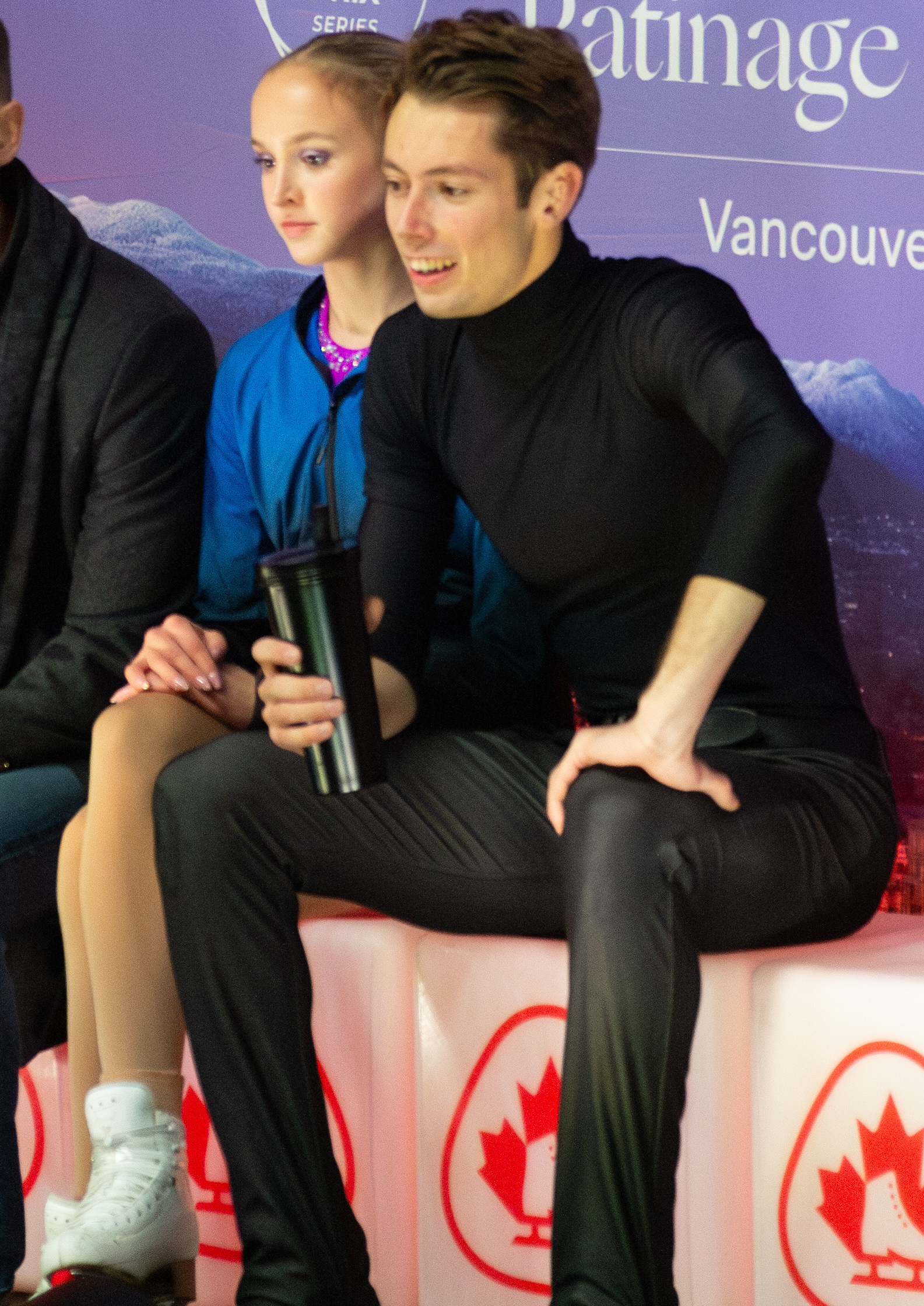
- Brooke McIntosh and Benjamin Mimar at the 2023 Skate Canada International

Personal information
- Born: November 26, 2000 (age 25) Laval, Quebec, Canada
- Home town: Toronto, Ontario
- Height: 1.93 m (6 ft 4 in)

Figure skating career
- Country: Canada
- Discipline: Pair skating
- Partner: Fiona Bombardier (2024-26); Brooke McIntosh (2020–24); Chloe Panetta (2018–20)
- Coach: Andrew Evans; Julie Marcotte; Josée Picard
- Skating club: Skate Oakville
- Began skating: 2003

Medal record
Canadian Championships
Silver medal – second place	2023 Oshawa	Pairs
World Junior Championships
Bronze medal – third place	2022 Tallinn	Pairs

Benjamin Mimar (born 26 November 2000) is a Canadian pair skater. With his former partner, Brooke McIntosh, he is the 2022 NHK Trophy bronze medallist and 2023 Canadian national silver medallist. McIntosh/Mimar are also the 2022 World Junior bronze medallists and the 2022 Canadian junior champions.

== Personal life ==
Mimar was born on 26 November 2000 in Laval, Quebec, Canada. He has a younger sister, Frédérique, who is also a skater.

== Career ==
=== Early years ===
Mimar began learning how to skate in 2003. Skating with Marjolaine Ouimet, he placed fifth in novice pairs at the 2016 Canadian Championships.

He later competed in junior pairs with Chloe Panetta, coached by Richard Gauthier, Eric Radford, Ian Connoly, Sylvie Fullum, and Marlene Picard in Montreal. The team appeared twice on the Junior Grand Prix circuit, placing ninth at the 2018 JGP Canada and eighth at the 2019 JGP Croatia. At the Canadian Junior Figure Skating Championships, they finished fourth in 2019 and fifth in 2020.

Panetta/Mimar ended their partnership sometime between late January 2020 and 18 February 2020, when Mimar began skating with McIntosh. McIntosh/Mimar competed twice domestically during the 2020–21 season.

=== 2021–22 season: Junior World bronze ===
McIntosh/Mimar broke the Canadian junior pairs record to win their first junior national title as a team at the 2022 Canadian Championships in January. Shortly after that, they competed at their first junior international assignment, the 2022 Bavarian Open in Oberstdorf, Germany, where they won the title and earned their ISU technical minimums to compete at the 2022 World Junior Championships in April.

The World Junior Championships were originally scheduled to be held in Sofia in the traditional early March period. However, due to the pandemic, they were moved. Due to Vladimir Putin's invasion of Ukraine, the ISU banned all Russian athletes from competing, which had a significant impact on a pairs field dominated by Russia in recent years. McIntosh/Mimar placed fourth in the short program but climbed to third in the free skate to finish third overall. They took the bronze medal behind Georgian team Safina/Berulava and Australian team Golubeva/Giotopoulos Moore. McIntosh later said of their mindset going into the free program, "we focused on what we had to do for the free skate. We knew we were prepared, and we just had to go and show that. Even through the uncertainty of this season, we kept training and kept motivated."

=== 2022–23 season ===
With the Russian ban continuing into the new season, McIntosh/Mimar made their senior international debut in a very open pairs field. In their Challenger series debut at the 2022 CS Finlandia Trophy, they won the bronze medal. Mimar noted the event as a "new experience" and assessed that "our free wasn't the best we could do, after a good short, but we are still happy with third place."

McIntosh and Mimar were invited to make their Grand Prix debut at the 2022 Skate Canada International. They finished fourth in their first Grand Prix appearance, setting new personal bests in the free skate and total score. At their second assignment, the 2022 NHK Trophy in Sapporo, they placed third in the short program despite a minor throw error and set a new personal best in that segment. McIntosh said it was a "lot of fun skating in front of the Japanese crowd." They were third in the free skate as well, despite McIntosh falling on a throw triple loop and seeming to hurt her shoulder. The team won the bronze medal, their first on the Grand Prix, with Mimar saying he was "very proud of my partner that she fought until then end despite a fall." McIntosh subsequently said her arm had been checked by a doctor and was fine.

Shortly after the end of the Grand Prix, McIntosh/Mimar were the silver medallists at the 2022–23 Skate Canada Challenge after a rough free skate dropped them behind the new team Pereira/Michaud. They went on to win the silver medal at the 2023 Canadian Championships. Mimar said that it was the first time he had felt "really confident on the ice" with their free skate. Despite their silver medal, they were not one of the three teams selected to compete at the 2023 Four Continents Championships, though they were named to make their World Championship debut. McIntosh/Mimar finished eleventh in Saitama.

=== 2023–24 season ===
The team was hampered by injury in the leadup to the season, being able to train heavily only in the final three weeks before their first competition: the 2023 Finlandia Trophy. They finished sixth at the event, having encountered difficulties in the free skate. Reflecting on their lack of preparation, Mimar said that "in general, we just have to keep working." On the Grand Prix, they finished sixth at the 2023 Skate Canada International. McIntosh and Mimar placed fifth in the short program at the 2023 Grand Prix of Espoo, but a difficult free skate dropped them to seventh place.

On February 22, Mimar announced that his partnership with McIntosh had ended and that he had teamed up with Fiona Bombardier.

=== 2024–25 season ===
The new team of Bombardier/Mimar continued training under Mimar's coach Andrew Evans. They were assigned to make their Challenger debut at the 2024 CS Warsaw Cup. They won the bronze medal in Warsaw. Soon after, Bombardier learned that what she had heretofore believed to be a minor hand injury was actually a fractured bone, which affected their training in advance of the national championships.

At the 2025 Canadian Championships, Bombardier/Mimar finished in fourth place. They were named as first alternates to the Canadian team for the Four Continents and World Championships.

=== 2025–26 season ===
In late April of 2026, Mimar and Bombardier announced the end of their partnership.

== Programs ==
=== Pair skating with Fiona Bombardier ===
Season	Short program	Free skating	Exhibition
2024–25	Beautiful Things by Benson Boone choreo. by Julie Marcotte	La La Land; Epilogue by Justin Hurwitz; City of Stars performed by Ryan Gosling & Emma Stone choreo. by Julie Marcotte	

=== Pair skating with Brooke McIntosh ===
Season	Short program	Free skating	Exhibition
2023–24	Oh! Darling by The Beatles choreo. by David Wilson, Sandra Bezic	Prologue (Look Down) / At the End of the Day performed by Bournemouth Symphony Orchestra & Seann Alderking; I Dreamed a Dream performed by Susan Boyle (from Les Misérables) by Claude-Michel Schönberg & Herbert Kretzmer choreo. by Carol Lane, Juris Razgulajevs; S.O.S. d'un terrien en détresse (from Starmania) by Michel Berger performed by Ariane Moffatt, Cirque du Soleil, & Jean-Philippe Goncalves; The Firmament by Karl Hugo choreo. by Carol Lane, Juris Razgulajevs	
2022–23	Release by Jennifer Thomas choreo. by David Wilson	Prologue (Look Down) / At the End of the Day performed by Bournemouth Symphony Orchestra & Seann Alderking; I Dreamed a Dream performed by Susan Boyle (from Les Misérables) by Claude-Michel Schönberg & Herbert Kretzmer choreo. by Carol Lane, Juris Razgulajevs	Cooler than Me by Mike Posner
2021–22	Happy Ending by MIKA choreo. by Alison Purkiss	Your Song (from Moulin Rouge!) by Elton John, Bernie Taupin performed by Ewan McGregor, Alessandro Safina choreo. by Alison Purkiss	
2020–21	Never Tear Us Apart by INXS performed by Paloma Faith choreo. by Alison Purkiss	Your Song (from Moulin Rouge!) by Elton John, Bernie Taupin performed by Ewan McGregor, Alessandro Safina choreo. by Alison Purkiss	

=== With Panetta ===
Season	Short program	Free skating
2019–20	Grace Kelly by MIKA choreo. by Julie Marcotte	Dream by Imagine Dragons choreo. by Julie Marcotte

== Competitive highlights ==
- GP – Event of the ISU Grand Prix Series
- JGP – Event of the ISU Junior Grand Prix Series
- CS – Event of the ISU Challenger Series
- TBD – Assigned
- WD – Withdrew from competition

=== Pair skating with Fiona Bombardier ===
Competition placements at senior level
Season	2024–25	2025–26
Canadian Championships	4th	
CS Warsaw Cup	3rd	

=== Pair skating with Brooke McIntosh ===
Competition placements at senior level
Season	2020–21	2022–23	2023–24
World Championships		11th	
Canadian Championships		2nd	
GP Finland			7th
GP NHK Trophy		3rd	
GP Skate Canada		4th	6th
CS Finlandia Trophy		3rd	6th
Skate Canada Challenge	4th	2nd	

Competition placements at junior level
Season	2021–22
World Junior Championships	3rd
Canadian Championships	1st
Bavarian Open	1st
Skate Canada Challenge	1st

=== Pair skating with Chloé Panetta ===
Competition placements at junior level
Season	2018–19	2019–20
Canadian Championships	4th	5th
JGP Canada	9th	
JGP Croatia		8th
Skate Canada Challenge	2nd	4th

== Detailed results ==
=== Pair skating with Fiona Bombardier ===
Results in the 2024–25 season
Date	Event	SP		FS		Total	
Date	Event	P	Score	P	Score	P	Score
Nov 20–24, 2024	(Poland) 2024 CS Warsaw Cup	4	56.84	3	113.67	3	170.51
Jan 14–19, 2025	(Canada) 2025 Canadian Championships	4	56.49	4	14.14	4	170.63

=== Pair skating with Brooke McIntosh ===
==== Senior level ====
2023–2024 season
Date	Event	SP	FS	Total
November 17–19, 2023	2023 Grand Prix of Espoo	5; 56.61	8; 90.66	7; 147.27
October 27–29, 2023	2023 Skate Canada International	5; 59.83	7; 106.17	6; 166.00
October 4–8, 2023	2022 CS Finlandia Trophy	4; 58.73	6; 98.77	6; 157.50
2022–2023 season
Date	Event	SP	FS	Total
March 20–26, 2023	2023 World Championships	10; 63.33	11; 118.62	11; 181.95
January 9–15, 2023	2023 Canadian Championships	2; 66.67	2; 120.59	2; 187.26
Nov. 30 – Dec. 3, 2022	2022–23 Skate Canada Challenge	1; 63.64	2; 109.02	2; 172.66
November 18–20, 2022	2022 NHK Trophy	3; 62.31	3; 113.34	3; 175.65
October 28–30, 2022	2022 Skate Canada International	4; 60.82	4; 114.67	4; 175.49
October 4–9, 2022	2022 CS Finlandia Trophy	3; 61.23	4; 105.38	3; 166.61

==== Junior level ====
2021–2022 season
Date	Event	Level	SP	FS	Total
April 13–17, 2022	2022 World Junior Championships	Junior	4; 58.00	3; 98.80	3; 156.80
January 18–23, 2022	2022 Bavarian Open	Junior	1; 51.81	1; 103.26	1; 155.07
January 6–12, 2022	2022 Canadian Junior Championships	Junior	1; 56.91	1; 99.04	1; 155.95
December 1–5, 2022	2022 Skate Canada Challenge	Junior	1; 54.75	1; 97.93	1; 152.68
2020–2021 season
Date	Event	Level	SP	FS	Total
January 8–17, 2021	2022 Skate Canada Challenge	Senior	4; 55.18	3; 111.51	4; 166.69
