= Livio Mayr =

Austrian pair skater

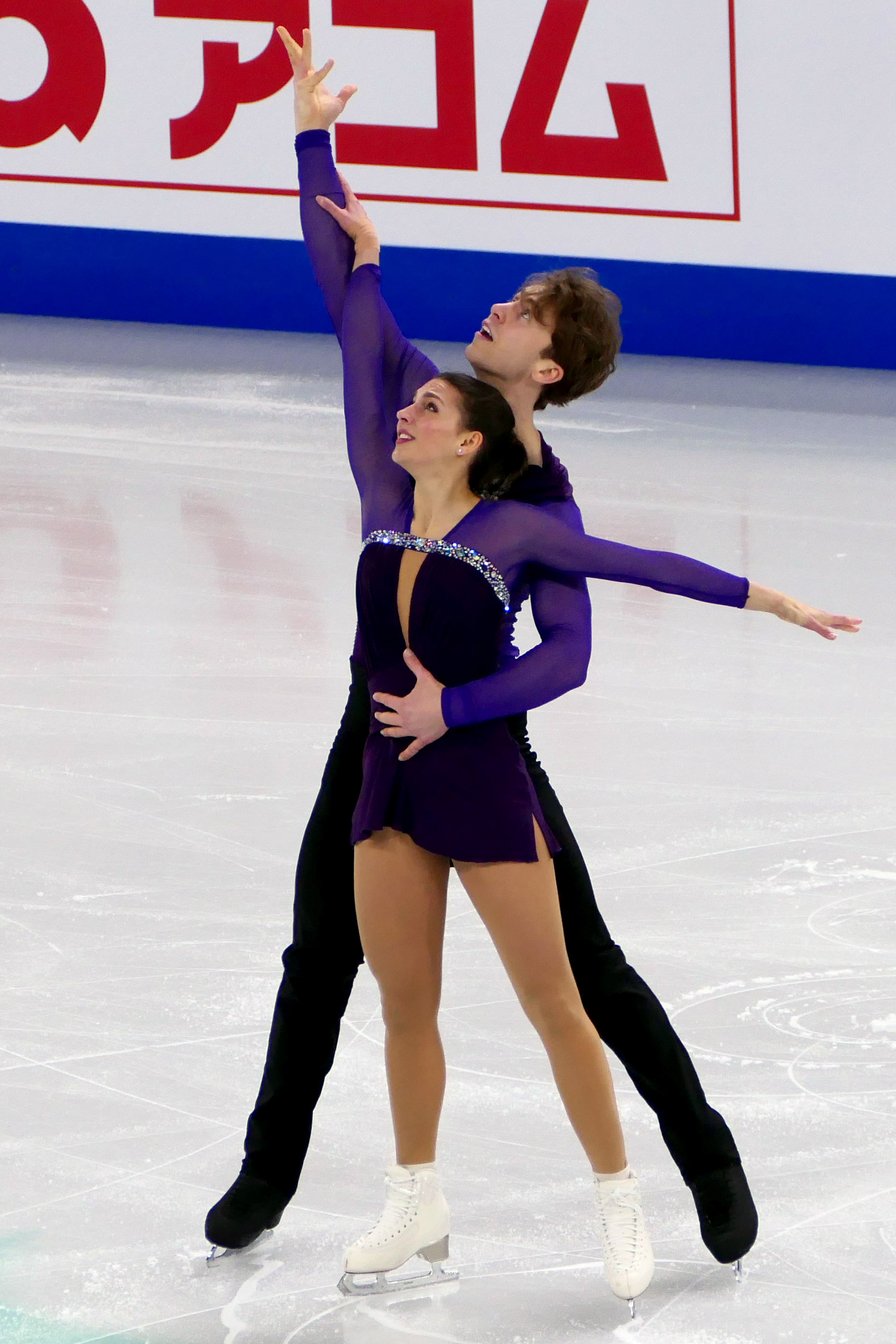
- Sophia Schaller and Livio Mayr at the 2024 World Championships

Personal information
- Born: 21 December 1997 (age 28) Salzburg, Austria
- Home town: Anif, Austria
- Height: 1.88 m (6 ft 2 in)

Figure skating career
- Country: Austria
- Discipline: Pair skating
- Partner: Sophia Schaller (since 2022); Olivia Boys-Eddy (2019–20); Sara Jane Dana (2018–19)
- Coach: Bruno Marcotte; Severin Kiefer; Brian Shales; Julia Kiefer; Violette Ivanoff
- Skating club: Eisunion Salzburg
- Began skating: 2006
- Retired: 31 July, 2026

Medal record
Austrian Championships
Gold medal – first place	2023 St. Pölten	Pairs
Gold medal – first place	2024 Feldkirch	Pairs
Gold medal – first place	2025 Dornbirn	Pairs
Silver medal – second place	2020 Klagenfurt	Pairs
Silver medal – second place	2026 Innsbruck	Pairs

Livio Mayr (born 21 December 1997) is an Austrian retired pair skater. With his current skating partner, Sophia Schaller, he is the 2023 Trophée Métropole Nice bronze medalist and a three-time Austrian national champion (2023–25).

== Personal life ==
Mayr was born on 21 December 1997 in Salzburg, Austria.

== Career ==
=== Early years ===
Mayr began learning how to skate in 2006. He began representing Austria internationally as a junior-level single skater in 2012. He competed in singles for five seasons, placing third at the Austrian Junior National Championships in 2014, 2016, and 2017, before opting to transition to pair skating.

=== 2018–19 season: Debut of Dana/Mayr ===
Mayr teamed up with his first pairs partner, American skater Sara Jane Dana, in advance of the 2018–19 season. They competed at two Junior Grand Prix events during their partnership, finishing 12th in Austria and 15th in the Czech Republic, as well as one international junior B event, the 2018 Golden Spin of Zagreb, where they placed fourth. Dana/Mayr won the silver medal in the junior pairs event behind Heidrun Pipal / Erik Pipal at the 2019 Austrian Championships before ultimately dissolving their partnership.

=== 2019–20 season: Debut of Boys-Eddy/Mayr ===
Mayr next partnered with Canadian pairs skater Olivia Boys-Eddy, advancing to the senior level. Boys-Eddy/Mayr competed internationally three times during the 2019–20 season, finishing 8th at the 2019 Volvo Open Cup, 9th at the 2020 Bavarian Open, and 13th at the 2020 Challenge Cup. They placed second at the 2020 Austrian Championships behind Miriam Ziegler / Severin Kiefer, but also chose to end their partnership in early 2020.

=== 2020–21 and 2021–22 season: Partnership with Choinard ===
Mayr teamed up with Canadian skater Chloe Choinard in the spring of 2020. Their partnership was immediately plagued by challenges as Canada went into precautionary lockdown in response to the COVID-19 pandemic the day after their first day of training together. Misfortune continued into 2021 as Choinard tore her meniscus during a training session in preparation for their competitive debut in September, effectively ending their season before it began. The team chose to part ways months later, with Mayr seeking a new partner and Choinard transitioning to synchronized skating.

=== 2022–23 season: Debut of Schaller/Mayr ===
Mayr teamed up with longtime Salzburg Skating Club-mate, Sophia Schaller, in May 2022 after a tryout session in Paris. He was initially interested in teaming up with Schaller in 2018 when he was first beginning his pairs career, but at the time, Schaller chose to prioritize her future in singles. The skaters would attribute their ease adapting to skating together to their long-standing relationship, having known one another since childhood and trained at the same rink for many years. Schaller/Mayr chose to train under Violette Ivanoff, former Austrian champion Severin Kiefer, and Kiefer's sister Julia in Salzburg. It was also announced that the duo would also make trips to Oakville, Ontario, Canada to work with Canadian pair coaches, Bruno Marcotte and Brian Shales.

The pair started the season by finishing fourth at the 2022 Tayside Trophy, fourth at the 2022 Trophée Métropole Nice Côte d'Azur, and fourth at the 2022 Ice Challenge. They would then compete on the 2022–23 ISU Challenger Series, finishing eleventh at the 2022 CS Golden Spin of Zagreb.

In December, Schaller/Mayr won their first national title at the 2022–23 Austrian Championships. They were then selected to compete at the 2023 European Championships in Espoo, Finland, where they finished in twelfth place. The pair would then conclude their season by finishing fifth at the 2023 Bavarian Open and ninth at the 2023 International Challenge Cup.

=== 2023–24 season ===
Schaller/Mayr started the season with an eighth-place finish at the 2023 John Nicks Pairs Challenge. Going on to compete on the 2023–24 ISU Challenger Series, the pair would place seventh at the 2023 CS Autumn Classic International. They would subsequently win a bronze medal at the 2023 Trophée Métropole Nice Côte d'Azur and place ninth at the 2023 Warsaw Cup.

In December, Schaller/Mayr would win gold at the 2023–24 Austrian Championships for a second consecutive time.

Going on to compete at the 2024 European Championships in Kaunas, Lithuania, the pair would finish in eighteenth place. They would then go on to place fifth at the 2024 International Challenge Cup.

Making their World Championship debut as a team at the 2024 World Championships in Montreal, Quebec, Canada, the pair would finish twenty-second.

=== 2024–25 season ===
Schaller/Mayr began the season by competing on the 2024–25 ISU Challenger Series, finishing fifteenth at the 2024 CS John Nicks International Pairs Competition, ninth at the 2024 CS Nebelhorn Trophy, and fifth at the 2024 CS Golden Spin of Zagreb. In mid-December, they would win their third consecutive national title at the 2025 Austrian Championships.

The pair went on to compete at the 2025 European Championships in Tallinn, Estonia, where they finished in sixteenth place. They then closed the season with a fifth-place finish at the 2025 International Challenge Cup.

=== 2025–26 season: Retirement ===
Schaller/Mayr began the season by competing at the John Nicks Pairs Challenger, placing 9th. Continuing, the pair competed at the Skate to Milano Olympic qualifying event, aiming to secure an Olympic quota for Austria in pairs for the upcoming Olympic Games. The pair had to place in the top three to secure the quota; failing to do so by placing 9th.

In November, the pair competed at Ice Challenge, as well as Cup of Innsbruck placing 5th and 4th respectively. Subsequently, placing 9th and garnering new season best results at Golden Spin.

Schaller/Mayr won the silver medal at the 2026 Austrian Nationals.

The pair closed their career by winning silver at the Bavarian Open. They announced their retirement on 31 July, 2026.

== Programs ==
=== Pair skating with Sophia Schaller ===
Season	Short program	Free skating
2025–2026	(You Make Me Feel Like) A Natural Woman; Respect by Aretha Franklin choreo. by Mark Pillay	Cosmic Love by Florence and the Machine choreo. by Mark Pillay & Paul Boll
2024–2025	(You Make Me Feel Like) A Natural Woman; Respect by Aretha Franklin choreo. by Mark Pillay	Pompeii by Bastille arranged by Hans Zimmer choreo. by Julie Marcotte
2023–2024	Helium (from Fifty Shades Darker) by Sia & Chris Braide; Cheer Me Up by Karl Hugo choreo. by Mark Pillay	Voices Carry by ADONA, UNSECRET, & Roary and The Colony choreo. by Mark Pillay
2022–2023	Stardust by Mika, ft. Chiara choreo. by Mark Pillay	Voices Carry by ADONA, UNSECRET, & Roary and The Colony choreo. by Mark Pillay

=== With Dana ===
Season	Short program	Free skating
2018–2019	Nocturnes, Op. 9 by Frédéric Chopin choreo. by Julie Marcotte, Valérie Saurette	It's Time performed by Gavin Mikhail choreo. by Julie Marcotte, Valérie Saurette

== Competitive highlights ==
- GP – Event of the ISU Grand Prix Series
- JGP – Event of the ISU Junior Grand Prix Series
- CS – Event of the ISU Challenger Series
- TBD – Assigned
- WD – Withdrew from competition

=== Pair skating with Sophia Schaller ===
Competition placements at senior level
Season	2022–23	2023–24	2024–25	2025–26
World Championships		22nd		
European Championships	12th	18th	16th	
Austrian Championships	1st	1st	1st	2nd
CS Autumn Classic		7th		
CS Golden Spin of Zagreb	11th		5th	9th
CS John Nicks Pairs		8th	15th	9th
CS Nebelhorn Trophy			9th	
Bavarian Open	5th		3rd	2nd
Challenge Cup	9th	5th	5th	
Cup of Innsbruck				4th
Ice Challenge	4th			5th
Skate to Milano				9th
Tayside Trophy	4th			
Trophée Métropole Nice	4th	3rd		
Warsaw Cup		9th		

=== Pairs with Boys-Eddy ===
International
Event	2019–20
Bavarian Open	9th
Challenge Cup	13th
Volvo Open Cup	8th
National
Austrian Champ.	2nd

=== Pairs with Dana ===
International: Junior
Event	2018–19
JGP Austria	12th
JGP Czech Republic	15th
Golden Spin	4th
National
Austrian Jr. Champ.	2nd

=== Men's singles ===
International: Junior
Event	12–13	13–14	14–15	15–16	16–17
Dragon Trophy		6th		5th	9th
Eiscup Innsbruck					2nd
Gardena Spring Trophy		9th			
Golden Bear	4th				
Ice Challenge	14th	15th			
Merano Cup		9th			
Skate Celje	2nd				
National
Austrian Champ.					6th
Austrian Jr. Champ.		3rd	5th	3rd	3rd

== Detailed results ==
=== Pair skating with Sophia Schaller ===
ISU personal best scores in the +5/-5 GOE System
Segment	Type	Score	Event
Total	TSS	168.71	2024 CS Golden Spin of Zagreb
Short program	TSS	56.96	2025 CS Golden Spin of Zagreb
Short program	TES	32.48	2025 CS Golden Spin of Zagreb
Short program	PCS	25.47	2024 CS Golden Spin of Zagreb
Free skating	TSS	102.68	2024 CS Golden Spin of Zagreb
Free skating	TES	53.82	2023 CS Autumn Classic International
Free skating	PCS	51.14	2024 CS Golden Spin of Zagreb

Results in the 2022–23 season
Date	Event	SP		FS		Total	
Date	Event	P	Score	P	Score	P	Score
Oct 15–16, 2022	(United Kingdom) 2022 Tayside Trophy	5	38.06	4	90.51	4	128.57
Oct 19–23, 2022	(France) 2022 Trophée Métropole Nice Côte d'Azur	4	43.12	4	84.27	4	127.39
Nov 9–13, 2022	(Austria) 2022 Ice Challenge	4	44.94	4	87.56	4	132.50
Dec 7–10, 2022	(Croatia) 2022 CS Golden Spin of Zagreb	10	47.46	11	85.50	11	132.96
Dec 14–18, 2022	(Austria) 2023 Austrian Championships	1	53.09	1	108.06	1	161.15
Jan 25–29, 2023	(Finland) 2023 European Championships	12	45.40	12	86.90	12	132.30
Jan 31 –Feb 5, 2023	(Germany) 2023 Bavarian Open	8	42.86	3	95.17	5	138.03
Feb 23–26, 2023	(Netherlands) 2023 International Challenge Cup	7	46.20	9	87.64	9	133.84

Results in the 2023–24 season
Date	Event	SP		FS		Total	
Date	Event	P	Score	P	Score	P	Score
Sep 6–7, 2023	(United States) 2023 John Nicks Pairs Challenge	5	52.21	10	83.47	8	135.68
Sep 14–17, 2023	(Canada) 2023 CS Autumn Classic International	8	50.94	7	99.41	7	150.35
Oct 18–22, 2023	(France) 2023 Trophée Métropole Nice Côte d'Azur	3	53.23	3	95.14	3	148.37
Nov 16–19, 2023	(Poland) 2023 Warsaw Cup	9	40.95	8	81.05	9	122.00
Dec 13–17, 2023	(Austria) 2024 Austrian Championships	1	49.57	1	90.43	1	140.00
Jan 10–14, 2024	(Lithuania) 2024 European Championships	18	42.57	–	–	18	42.57
Feb 22–25, 2024	(Netherlands) 2024 International Challenge Cup	4	53.29	5	105.17	5	158.46
Mar 18–24, 2024	(Canada) 2024 World Championships	22	49.54	–	–	22	49.54

Results in the 2024-25 season
Date	Event	SP		FS		Total	
Date	Event	P	Score	P	Score	P	Score
Sep 3–4, 2024	(United States) 2024 CS John Nicks Pairs Competition	14	42.27	15	81.90	15	124.17
Sep 19-21, 2024	(Germany) 2024 CS Nebelhorn Trophy	9	51.89	10	92.57	9	144.46
Dec 4-7, 2024	(Croatia) 2024 CS Golden Spin of Zagreb	4	56.61	6	102.68	5	159.29
Dec 11-15, 2024	(Austria) 2025 Austrian Championships	1	58.83	2	109.88	1	168.71
Jan 20-26, 2025	(Germany) 2025 Bavarian Open	2	51.75	3	91.47	3	143.22
Jan 28 – Feb 2, 2025	(Estonia) 2025 European Championships	15	52.11	16	90.20	16	142.31
Feb 13–16, 2025	(Netherlands) 2025 Challenge Cup	5	49.27	5	93.36	5	142.63

Results in the 2025–26 season
Date	Event	SP		FS		Total	
Date	Event	P	Score	P	Score	P	Score
Sep 2–3, 2025	(United States) 2025 CS John Nicks International Pairs Competition	9	53.59	9	99.78	9	153.37
Sep 18-21, 2025	(China) 2025 ISU Skate to Milano	10	50.82	10	89.04	9	139.86
Nov 5–9, 2025	(Austria) 2025 Ice Challenge	7	49.77	5	98.32	5	148.09
Nov 13-16, 2025	(Austria) 2025 Cup of Innsbruck	4	57.67	3	94.42	4	152.09
Dec 3-6, 2025	(Croatia) 2025 CS Golden Spin of Zagreb	9	56.96	9	100.94	9	157.90
Dec 10-13, 2025	(Austria) 2026 Austrian Championships	2	57.11	2	100.44	2	157.55
Jan 27 – Feb 1, 2026	(Germany) 2026 Bavarian Open	1	54.10	2	91.39	2	145.49
