= Sophia Schaller =

Austrian figure skater

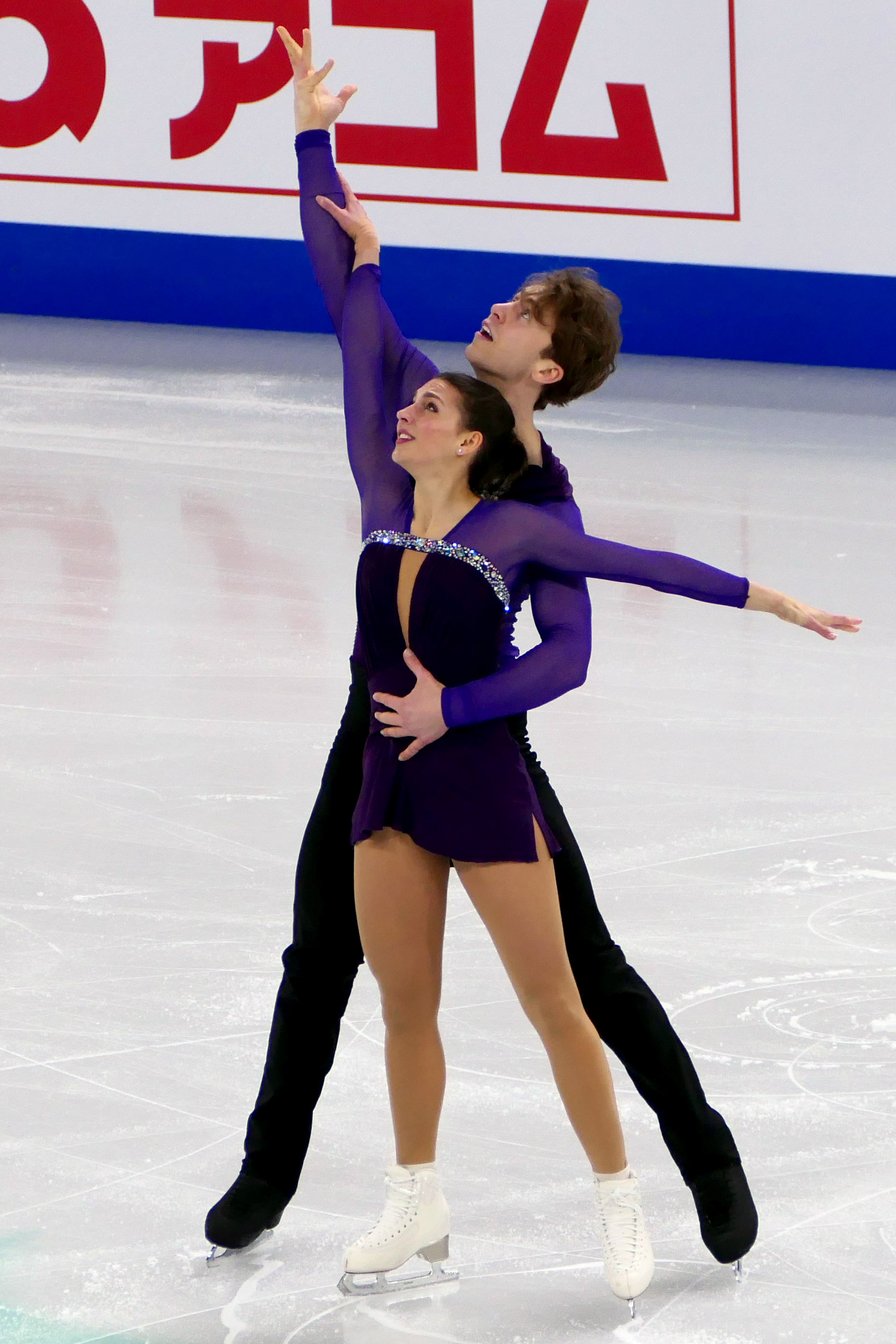
- Sophia Schaller and Livio Mayr at the 2024 World Championships

Personal information
- Born: 17 September 2000 (age 26) Salzburg, Austria
- Height: 1.62 m (5 ft 4 in)

Figure skating career
- Country: Austria
- Discipline: Pair skating (since 2022); Women's singles (2016–23)
- Partner: Livio Mayr (since 2022)
- Coach: Bruno Marcotte; Severin Kiefer; Brian Shales; Julia Kiefer; Violette Ivanoff
- Skating club: Eiskunstlaufverein Salzburg
- Began skating: 2007
- Retired: 31 July 2026

Medal record
Austrian Championships
Gold medal – first place	2023 St. Pölten	Pairs
Gold medal – first place	2024 Feldkirch	Pairs
Gold medal – first place	2025 Dornbirn	Pairs
Silver medal – second place	2026 Innsbruck	Pairs
Silver medal – second place	2019 Gmunden	Singles
Silver medal – second place	2020 Klagenfurt	Singles
Silver medal – second place	2021 Linz	Singles
Silver medal – second place	2023 St. Pölten	Singles
Bronze medal – third place	2018 Vienna	Singles
Bronze medal – third place	2022 Graz	Singles

Sophia Schaller (born 17 September 2000) is an Austrian retired figure skater who currently competes in the pairs discipline with Livio Mayr. Together, they are three-time Austrian national champions (2023–25).

As a singles skater, she is the 2018 Sarajevo Open champion, the 2019 Santa Claus Cup bronze medalist, the 2017 Austrian junior national silver medalist, and a six-time Austrian national medalist.

== Personal life ==
Schaller was born on 17 September 2000 in Salzburg, Austria. Her younger sister, Flora Marie Schaller, is also a competitive figure skater, competing in the women's singles event.

== Career ==
=== Early career ===
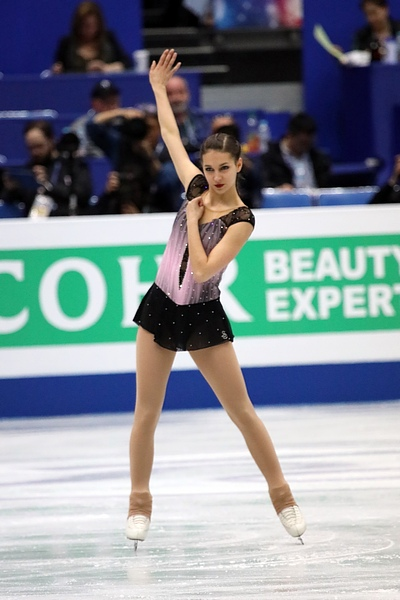
Schaller at the 2019 World Championships

Schaller began figure skating in 2007. Joining the Salzburg Skating Club, she was first coached by Iva Žvachtová before switching to Julia Kiefer and Sandra Riegler prior to the 2016–17 figure skating season. On the junior level, she would win silver at the 2016–17 Austrian Championships and the 2017–18 Austrian Championships in the women's singles discipline.

In her first year competing on the national senior level, Schaller would win bronze at the 2018–19 Austrian Championships. The following year, Violette Ivanoff would join Schaller's coaching team and after winning silver at the 2019–20 Austrian Championships, Schaller was selected to represent Austria at the 2020 European Championships and the 2020 World Championships. She would place twenty-sixth and thirty-seventh at these events, respectively.

Continuing on as a singles skater, Schaller would win silver at the 2020–21 Austrian Championships and bronze at the 2021–22 Austrian Championships.

=== 2022–23 season: Debut of Schaller/Mayr ===
In May 2022, Schaller decided to try pair skating with longtime Salzburg Skating Club-mate, Livio Mayr, after having a tryout session in Paris. Mayr was initially interested in teaming up with Schaller in 2018 when he was first beginning his pairs career, but at the time, Schaller had chosen to prioritize her future in singles. The skaters would attribute their ease adapting to skating together to their long-standing relationship, having known one another since childhood and trained at the same rink for many years. Schaller/Mayr chose to train under Schaller's longtime coaches, Violette Ivanoff and Julia Kiefer, with the addition of former Austrian champion pair skater, Severin Kiefer. It was also announced that the duo would also make trips to Oakville, Ontario, Canada to work with Canadian pair coaches, Bruno Marcotte and Brian Shales.

The pair started the season by finishing fourth at the 2022 Tayside Trophy, fourth at the 2022 Trophée Métropole Nice Côte d'Azur, and fourth at the 2022 Ice Challenge. They would then compete on the 2022–23 ISU Challenger Series, finishing eleventh at the 2022 CS Golden Spin of Zagreb.

In December, Schaller/Mayr won their first national title at the 2022–23 Austrian Championships. They were then selected to compete at the 2023 European Championships in Espoo, Finland, where they finished in twelfth place. The pair would then conclude their season by finishing fifth at the 2023 Bavarian Open and ninth at the 2023 International Challenge Cup.

=== 2023–24 season ===
Schaller/Mayr started the season with an eighth-place finish at the 2023 John Nicks Pairs Challenge. Going on to compete on the 2023–24 ISU Challenger Series, the pair would place seventh at the 2023 CS Autumn Classic International. They would subsequently win a bronze medal at the 2023 Trophée Métropole Nice Côte d'Azur and place ninth at the 2023 Warsaw Cup.

In December, Schaller/Mayr would win gold at the 2023–24 Austrian Championships for a second consecutive time.

Going on to compete at the 2024 European Championships in Kaunas, Lithuania, the pair would finish in eighteenth place. They would then go on to place fifth at the 2024 International Challenge Cup.

Making their World Championship debut as a team at the 2024 World Championships in Montreal, Quebec, Canada, the pair would finish twenty-second.

=== 2024–25 season ===
Schaller/Mayr began the season by competing on the 2024–25 ISU Challenger Series, finishing fifteenth at the 2024 CS John Nicks International Pairs Competition, ninth at the 2024 CS Nebelhorn Trophy, and fifth at the 2024 CS Golden Spin of Zagreb. In mid-December, they would win their third consecutive national title at the 2025 Austrian Championships.

The pair went on to compete at the 2025 European Championships in Tallinn, Estonia, where they finished in sixteenth place. They then closed the season with a fifth-place finish at the 2025 International Challenge Cup.

=== 2025–26 season: Retirement ===
Schaller/Mayr began the season by competing at the John Nicks Pairs Challenger, placing 9th. Continuing, the pair competed at the Skate to Milano Olympic qualifying event, aiming to secure an Olympic quota for Austria in pairs for the upcoming Olympic Games. The pair had to place in the top three to secure the quota; failing to do so by placing 9th.

In November, the pair competed at Ice Challenge, as well as Cup of Innsbruck placing 5th and 4th respectively. Subsequently, placing 9th and garnering new season best results at Golden Spin.

Schaller/Mayr won the silver medal at the 2026 Austrian Nationals.

The pair closed their career by winning silver at the Bavarian Open. They announced their retirement on 31 July 2026.

== Programs ==
=== With Mayr ===
Season	Short program	Free skating
2025–2026	(You Make Me Feel Like) A Natural Woman; Respect by Aretha Franklin choreo. by Mark Pillay	Cosmic Love by Florence and the Machine choreo. by Mark Pillay & Paul Boll
2024–2025	(You Make Me Feel Like) A Natural Woman; Respect by Aretha Franklin choreo. by Mark Pillay	Pompeii by Bastille arranged by Hans Zimmer choreo. by Julie Marcotte
2023–2024	Helium (from Fifty Shades Darker) by Sia & Chris Braide; Cheer Me Up by Karl Hugo choreo. by Mark Pillay	Voices Carry by ADONA, UNSECRET, & Roary and The Colony choreo. by Mark Pillay
2022–2023	Stardust by Mika, ft. Chiara choreo. by Mark Pillay	Voices Carry by ADONA, UNSECRET, & Roary and The Colony choreo. by Mark Pillay

=== Women's singles ===
Season	Short program	Free skating
2022–2023	Voilà by Barbara Pravi, Lili Poe, Igit choreo. by Mark Pillay	Breath of Life by Florence and the Machine, James Newton Howard, Isabella Summers; A Touch of Joy by Maxime Rodriguez choreo. by Mark Pillay
2021–2022	Paint It Black by The Rolling Stones performed by Ramin Djawadi, Vanessa Carlton choreo. by Mark Pillay	Breath of Life by Florence and the Machine, James Newton Howard, Isabella Summers; A Touch of Joy by Maxime Rodriguez choreo. by Mark Pillay
2020–2021	Jazz Man by Beth Hart choreo. by Mark Pillay	Breath of Life by Florence and the Machine, James Newton Howard, Isabella Summers; A Touch of Joy by Maxime Rodriguez choreo. by Mark Pillay
2019–2020	Jazz Man by Beth Hart choreo. by Mark Pillay	Adiós Nonino by Astor Piazzolla performed by Tango for Four choreo. by Mark Pillay
2018–2019	Paint It Black by The Rolling Stones performed by Ramin Djawadi, Vanessa Carlton choreo. by Mark Pillay	Adiós Nonino by Astor Piazzolla performed by Tango for Four choreo. by Mark Pillay
2017–2018	Paint It Black by The Rolling Stones performed by Ramin Djawadi, Vanessa Carlton choreo. by Mark Pillay	Monsieur Chocolat by Gabriel Yared choreo. by Lorenzo Magri
2016–2017	Kung Fu Panda by Hans Zimmer, John Powell performed by The Piano Guys choreo. by Maria Barghoorn	Monsieur Chocolat by Gabriel Yared choreo. by Lorenzo Magri

== Competitive highlights ==
- GP – Event of the ISU Grand Prix Series
- JGP – Event of the ISU Junior Grand Prix Series
- CS – Event of the ISU Challenger Series
- TBD – Assigned
- WD – Withdrew from competition

=== Pair skating with Livio Mayr ===
Competition placements at senior level
Season	2022–23	2023–24	2024–25	2025–26
World Championships		22nd		
European Championships	12th	18th	16th	
Austrian Championships	1st	1st	1st	2nd
CS Autumn Classic		7th		
CS Golden Spin of Zagreb	11th		5th	9th
CS John Nicks Pairs		8th	15th	9th
CS Nebelhorn Trophy			9th	
Bavarian Open	5th		3rd	2nd
Challenge Cup	9th	5th	5th	
Cup of Innsbruck				4th
Ice Challenge	4th			5th
Skate to Milano				9th
Tayside Trophy	4th			
Trophée Métropole Nice	4th	3rd		
Warsaw Cup		9th		

=== Single skating ===
Competition placements at senior level
Season	2016–17	2017–18	2018–19	2019–20	2020–21	2021–22	2022–23
World Championships			37th				
European Championships			26th				
Austrian Championships		3rd	2nd	2nd	2nd	3rd	2nd
CS Alpen Trophy			17th				
CS Cup of Austria						8th	
CS Finlandia Trophy			18th				
CS Lombardia Trophy				15th		8th	
CS Nebelhorn Trophy						19th	
CS Nepela Memorial				15th			
CS Warsaw Cup				WD			
Bavarian Open				7th		5th	
Challenge Cup			10th	18th		5th	
Christmas Cup			4th				
Coupe du Printemps		10th					
Dragon Trophy	7th		5th	5th		4th	
EduSport Trophy				5th			
Golden Bear of Zagreb		6th	10th	11th			
Halloween Cup				15th			
IceLab Cup						2nd	
Merano Cup						3rd	
Mentor Cup			14th				
NRW Trophy						4th	
Prague Ice Cup				5th			
Santa Claus Cup				3rd			WD
Sarajevo Open		1st					
Skate Celje					6th		1st
Trophée Métropole Nice						7th	5th

Competition placements at junior level
Season	2016–17	2017–18	2018–19
Austrian Championships	2nd	2nd	
JGP Austria		19th	
JGP Germany	19th		
JGP Italy		22nd	
JGP Lithuania			15th
JGP Russia	10th		
JGP Slovakia			18th
Cup of Nice	9th		
Cup of Tyrol	8th		
Golden Bear of Zagreb	12th		
Leu Scheu Memorial		5th	
Santa Claus Cup	2nd	6th	
Tallinn Trophy		8th	

== Detailed results ==
=== Pair skating with Livio Mayr ===
ISU personal best scores in the +5/-5 GOE System
Segment	Type	Score	Event
Total	TSS	168.71	2024 CS Golden Spin of Zagreb
Short program	TSS	56.96	2025 CS Golden Spin of Zagreb
Short program	TES	32.48	2025 CS Golden Spin of Zagreb
Short program	PCS	25.47	2024 CS Golden Spin of Zagreb
Free skating	TSS	102.68	2024 CS Golden Spin of Zagreb
Free skating	TES	53.82	2023 CS Autumn Classic International
Free skating	PCS	51.14	2024 CS Golden Spin of Zagreb

Results in the 2022–23 season
Date	Event	SP		FS		Total	
Date	Event	P	Score	P	Score	P	Score
15–16 Oct 2022	(United Kingdom) 2022 Tayside Trophy	5	38.06	4	90.51	4	128.57
19–23 Oct 2022	(France) 2022 Trophée Métropole Nice Côte d'Azur	4	43.12	4	84.27	4	127.39
9–13 Nov 2022	(Austria) 2022 Ice Challenge	4	44.94	4	87.56	4	132.50
7–10 Dec 2022	(Croatia) 2022 CS Golden Spin of Zagreb	10	47.46	11	85.50	11	132.96
14–18 Dec 2022	(Austria) 2023 Austrian Championships	1	53.09	1	108.06	1	161.15
25–29 Jan 2023	(Finland) 2023 European Championships	12	45.40	12	86.90	12	132.30
31 Jan –5 February 2023	(Germany) 2023 Bavarian Open	8	42.86	3	95.17	5	138.03
23–26 Feb 2023	(Netherlands) 2023 International Challenge Cup	7	46.20	9	87.64	9	133.84

Results in the 2023–24 season
Date	Event	SP		FS		Total	
Date	Event	P	Score	P	Score	P	Score
6–7 Sep 2023	(United States) 2023 John Nicks Pairs Challenge	5	52.21	10	83.47	8	135.68
14–17 Sep 2023	(Canada) 2023 CS Autumn Classic International	8	50.94	7	99.41	7	150.35
18–22 Oct 2023	(France) 2023 Trophée Métropole Nice Côte d'Azur	3	53.23	3	95.14	3	148.37
16–19 Nov 2023	(Poland) 2023 Warsaw Cup	9	40.95	8	81.05	9	122.00
13–17 Dec 2023	(Austria) 2024 Austrian Championships	1	49.57	1	90.43	1	140.00
10–14 Jan 2024	(Lithuania) 2024 European Championships	18	42.57	—N/a	—N/a	18	42.57
22–25 Feb 2024	(Netherlands) 2024 International Challenge Cup	4	53.29	5	105.17	5	158.46
18–24 Mar 2024	(Canada) 2024 World Championships	22	49.54	—N/a	—N/a	22	49.54

Results in the 2024-25 season
Date	Event	SP		FS		Total	
Date	Event	P	Score	P	Score	P	Score
3–4 Sep 2024	(United States) 2024 CS John Nicks Pairs Competition	14	42.27	15	81.90	15	124.17
19–21 Sep 2024	(Germany) 2024 CS Nebelhorn Trophy	9	51.89	10	92.57	9	144.46
4–7 Dec 2024	(Croatia) 2024 CS Golden Spin of Zagreb	4	56.61	6	102.68	5	159.29
11–15 Dec 2024	(Austria) 2025 Austrian Championships	1	58.83	2	109.88	1	168.71
20–26 Jan 2025	(Germany) 2025 Bavarian Open	2	51.75	3	91.47	3	143.22
28 Jan – 2 Feb 2025	(Estonia) 2025 European Championships	15	52.11	16	90.20	16	142.31
13–16 Feb 2025	(Netherlands) 2025 Challenge Cup	5	49.27	5	93.36	5	142.63

Results in the 2025–26 season
Date	Event	SP		FS		Total	
Date	Event	P	Score	P	Score	P	Score
2–3 Sep 2025	(United States) 2025 CS John Nicks International Pairs Competition	9	53.59	9	99.78	9	153.37
18–21 Sep 2025	(China) 2025 ISU Skate to Milano	10	50.82	10	89.04	9	139.86
5–9 Nov 2025	(Austria) 2025 Ice Challenge	7	49.77	5	98.32	5	148.09
13–16 Nov 2025	(Austria) 2025 Cup of Innsbruck	4	57.67	3	94.42	4	152.09
3–6 Dec 2025	(Croatia) 2025 CS Golden Spin of Zagreb	9	56.96	9	100.94	9	157.90
10–13 Dec 2025	(Austria) 2026 Austrian Championships	2	57.11	2	100.44	2	157.55
27 Jan – 1 Feb 2026	(Germany) 2026 Bavarian Open	1	54.10	2	91.39	2	145.49

=== Single skating ===
==== Senior level ====
2022–2023 season
Date	Event	SP	FS	Total
14–18 December 2022	2023 Austrian Championships	1; 58.98	3; 94.29	2; 150.83
28 November – 4 December 2022	2022 Santa Claus Cup	13; 43.17	WD	WD
19–23 October 2022	2022 International Cup of Nice	2; 52.99	7; 96.40	5; 149.39
2021–2022 season
Date	Event	SP	FS	Total
24–27 February 2022	2022 Challenge Cup	5; 53.59	1; 104.47	4; 158.06
11–13 February 2022	2022 Dragon Trophy	15; 48.46	7; 103.55	8; 152.01
5–6 February 2022	2022 Merano Ice Trophy	3; 51.96	2; 100.09	3; 152.05
18–23 January 2022	2022 Bavarian Open	5; 55.52	5; 104.73	5; 160.25
13–14 January 2022	2022 Icelab International	2; 50.86	3; 83.90	2; 134.76
9–11 December 2021	2022 Austrian Championships	3; 58.82	3; 107.34	3; 166.16
18–21 November 2021	2021 Skate Celje	3; 53.58	1; 113.85	1; 167.43
11–14 November 2021	2021 CS Cup of Austria	15; 48.46	7; 103.55	8; 152.01
4–7 November 2021	2021 NRW Trophy	6; 50.56	3; 98.76	4; 149.32
20–24 October 2021	2021 Cup of Nice	12; 40.04	5; 99.99	7; 140.04
22–25 September 2021	2021 CS Nebelhorn Trophy	18; 48.92	20; 89.83	19; 138.75
10–12 September 2021	2021 CS Lombardia Trophy	9; 52.45	6; 106.63	8; 159.08
2020–2021 season
Date	Event	SP	FS	Total
12–14 February 2021	2021 Celje Open	7; 49.33	5; 95.47	6; 144.80
10-12 December 2020	2020 Austrian Championships	2; 47.48	2; 92.40	2; 139.88
2019–2020 season
Date	Event	SP	FS	Total
20-23 February 2020	2020 Challenge Cup	21; 39.71	16; 91.09	18; 130.80
3-9 February 2020	2020 Bavarian Open	9; 49.83	5; 101.00	7; 150.83
30 January - 2 February 2020	2020 Dragon Trophy	8; 50.10	5; 99.51	5; 149.61
8-12 January 2020	2020 EduSport Trophy	5; 47.98	5; 89.94	5; 137.92
12-14 December 2019	2020 Austrian Championships	1; 56.72	2; 108.52	2; 165.24
2-8 December 2019	2019 Santa Claus Cup	4; 47.24	3; 94.61	3; 141.85
22-24 November 2019	2019 Eiscup Innsbruck	2; 52.44	2; 97.48	2; 149.92
8-10 November 2019	2019 Prague Ice Cup	7; 46.48	2; 95.54	5; 142.02
24-27 October 2019	2019 Golden Bear	14; 45.10	7; 95.50	11; 140.60
17-20 October 2019	2019 Halloween Cup	13; 44.10	14; 77.58	15; 121.68
19-21 September 2019	2019 Ondrej Nepela	17; 43.11	14; 81.54	15; 124.65
13-15 September 2019	2019 Lombardia Trophy	15; 38.76	15; 81.32	15; 120.08
2018–2019 season
Date	Event	SP	FS	Total
18-24 March 2019	2019 World Championships	37; 48.72	-	37; 48.72
21-24 February 2019	2019 Challenge Cup	14; 47.23	7; 93.02	10; 140.25
7-10 February 2019	2019 Dragon Trophy	2; 52.47	5; 90.39	5; 142.86
15-21 January 2019	2019 European Championships	26; 44.20	-	26; 44.20
8-13 January 2019	2019 Mentor Toruń Cup	16; 39.75	10; 80.82	14; 120.57
13-16 December 2018	2019 Austrian Championships	2; 46.35	1; 87.33	2; 133.68
29 November - 2 December 2018	2018 Santa Claus Cup	2; 51.30	5; 84.15	4; 135.45
11-18 November 2018	2018 Alpen Trophy	20; 44.60	16; 85.45	17; 130.05
25-28 October 2018	2018 Golden Bear	15; 43.43	7; 92.94	10; 136.37
5-7 October 2018	2018 Finlandia Trophy	17; 45.48	18; 81.53	18; 127.01
2017–2018 season
Date	Event	SP	FS	Total
16-18 March 2018	2018 Coupe du Printemps	11; 40.15	10; 74.75	10; 114.90
1-4 March 2018	2018 Sarajevo Open	1; 50.03	2; 90.36	1; 140.39
13-16 December 2017	2018 Austrian Championships	2; 49.69	3; 80.72	3; 130.41
26-26 October 2017	2017 Golden Bear	7; 41.65	7; 70.04	6; 111.69
2016–2017 season
Date	Event	SP	FS	Total
9-12 February 2017	2017 Dragon Trophy	7; 38.01	7; 63.75	7; 101.76

==== Junior results ====
2018–2019 season
Date	Event	SP	FS	Total
5-8 September 2018	ISU Junior Grand Prix in Lithuania	12; 45.00	15; 79.84	15; 124.84
22-25 August 2018	2018 JGP SLovakia	19; 41.04	17; 79.91	18; 120.95
2017–2018 season
Date	Event	SP	FS	Total
13-16 December 2017	2018 Austrian Junior Championships	1; 51.19	2; 89.48	2; 140.67
4-10 December 2017	2017 Santa Claus Cup	3; 47.10	7; 78.32	6; 125.32
20-22 November 2017	2017 Tallinn Trophy	6; 45.19	8; 84.92	8; 130.11
8-12 November 2017	2017 Ice Challenge (Leo Scheu)	4; 44.64	5; 74.47	5; 119.11
11-14 October 2017	2017 JGP Italy	21; 36.34	22; 66.21	22; 102.55
30 August - 2 September 2017	20017 JGP Austria	13; 44.61	20; 67.33	19; 111.94
2016–2017 season
Date	Event	SP	FS	Total
28 February - 5 March 2017	2017 Cup of Tyrol	10; 40.86	8; 72.79	8; 113.65
14-17 December 2016	2017 Austrian Junior Championships	1; 49.82	2; 81.54	2; 131.36
6-11 December 2016	2016 Santa Claus Cup	5; 43.26	2; 88.70	2; 131.96
25-27 November 2016	2016 Eiscup Innsbruck	1; 46.09	1; 80.74	1; 126.83
27-30 October 2016	2016 Golden Bear	13; 40.19	10; 72.16	12; 112.35
19-23 October 2016	2016 Cup of Nice	11; 38.84	8; 75.97	9; 114.81
5-8 October 2016	2016 JGP Germany	17; 43.98	22; 74.59	19; 118.57
14-17 September 2016	2016 JGP Russia	11; 40.23	9; 79.61	10; 119.84
