= Mark Pillay =

Canadian figure skating choreographer

Personal information
- Born: 1978 or 1979 Moose Jaw, Saskatchewan

Figure skating career
- Country: Canada
- Retired: 2001

Mark Pillay (born 1978 or 1979) is a Canadian figure skating choreographer and former competitive men's singles figure skater.

== Biography ==
Pillay was born in Moose Jaw, Saskatchewan to a British mother and South African father. He began figure skating after being encouraged by a childhood friend to give it a try. He was initially coached by Betty Calvert and Dale Hazell, before eventually relocating to Calgary, Alberta to be coached by Sharon Lariviere and later Vancouver, British Columbia to train under Joanne McLeod. He qualified for the 2001 Canadian Championships, where he finished twenty-seventh.

Following the event, Pillay retired from competitive figure skating and began attending Simon Fraser University, where he studied dance. He began working as a figure skating choreographer in 2002. Pillay has worked with figure skaters from several different countries and regularly holds seminars and training camps for skaters to attend. He currently resides in Vancouver.

Figure skaters that Pillay has worked with over the years include:

- (Estonia) Johanna Allik
- (Canada) Larkyn Austman
- (Canada) Hayleigh Bell / Rudi Swiegers
- (Canada) Emily Bausback
- (Germany) Alexander Bjelde
- (Canada) Katherine Bobak / Ian Beharry
- (Finland) Linnea Ceder
- (United States) Karen Chen
- (Poland) Ioulia Chtchetinina / Michał Woźniak
- (Poland) Maciej Cieplucha
- (United States) Richard Dornbush
- (Germany) Paul Fentz
- (Canada) Liam Firus
- (Canada) Mitchell Gordon
- (Canada) Olivia Gran
- (Germany) Minami Hanashiro
- (Germany) Minerva Fabienne Hase / Nolan Seegert
- (Germany) Minerva Fabienne Hase / Nikita Volodin
- (United States) Tomoki Hiwatashi
- (Austria) Gabriella Izzo / Luc Maierhofer
- (Germany) Kai Jagoda
- (Canada) Brittany Jones / Ian Beharry
- (Canada) Brittany Jones / Joshua Reagan
- (Australia) Brendan Kerry
- (Hong Kong) Ronald Lam
- (Canada) Kelly Ann Laurin / Loucas Éthier
- (Canada) Paige Lawrence / Rudi Swiegers
- (Chinese Taipei) Amy Lin
- (Spain) Brooke McIntosh / Marco Zandron
- (United Kingdom) Natasha McKay
- (Mexico) Andrea Montesinos Cantú
- (Canada) Kirsten Moore-Towers / Michael Marinaro
- (Canada) Kirsten Moore-Towers / Dylan Moscovitch
- (United States) Gabrielle Noullet
- (United States) Shotaro Omori
- (Finland) Beata Papp
- (Finland) Bela Papp
- (Finland) Emmi Peltonen
- (Estonia) Niina Petrõkina
- (United States) Tyler Pierce
- (Estonia) Brita Paula Poder
- (Canada) Aleksa Rakic
- (Canada) Shalena Rau / Phelan Simpson
- (Canada) Kevin Reynolds
- (Finland) Jenni Saarinen
- (Canada) Roman Sadovsky
- (Canada) Haley Sales / Nikolas Wamsteeker
- (Canada) Emmanuel Sandhu
- (Austria) Flora Marie Schaller
- (Austria) Sophia Schaller
- (Austria) Sophia Schaller / Livio Mayr
- (Canada) Taylor Steele / Robert Schultz
- (United States) Deanna Stellato / Nathan Bartholomay
- (Germany) Thomas Stoll
- (Sweden) Anton Truve
- (Netherlands) Michel Tsiba
- (United Kingdom) Anastasia Vaipan-Law / Luke Digby
- (Germany) Mari Vartmann / Ruben Blommaert
- (Germany) Mari Vartmann / Aaron Van Cleave
- (United States) Angela Wang
- (Austria) Miriam Ziegler / Severin Kiefer

== Competitive highlights ==
National
Event	2000–01
Canadian Championships	27th
