= 2023 CS Autumn Classic International =

Figure skating competition in Montreal, Canada

- Type: ISU Challenger Series
- Date: September 14 – 16
- Season: 2023–24
- Location: Montreal, Quebec, Canada
- Host: Skate Canada
- Venue: Sportplexe Pierrefonds

Champions
- Men's singles: (United States) Ilia Malinin
- Women's singles: (Japan) Kaori Sakamoto
- Pairs: (Canada) Deanna Stellato-Dudek / Maxime Deschamps
- Ice dance: (United States) Eva Pate / Logan Bye
- Previous: 2021 CS Autumn Classic International
- Previous CS: 2023 CS Lombardia Trophy
- Next CS: 2023 CS Nebelhorn Trophy

The 2023 CS Autumn Classic International was held on September 14–16, 2023, in Montreal, Quebec, Canada. It was part of the 2023–24 ISU Challenger Series. Medals were awarded in men's singles, women's singles, pair skating, and ice dance.

== Entries ==
The International Skating Union published the list of entries on August 15, 2023.

Country	Men	Women	Pairs	Ice dance
Australia	—		—	Holly Harris / Jason Chan
Austria	—		Sophia Schaller / Livio Mayr	—
Canada	Wesley Chiu	Justine Miclette	Caidence Derenisky / Raine Eberl	Sandrine Gauthier / Quentin Thieren
Canada	Stephen Gogolev	Kaiya Ruiter	Emmanuelle Proft / Nicolas Nadeau	Alyssa Robinson / Jacob Portz
Canada	—	—	Deanna Stellato-Dudek / Maxime Deschamps	—
China	Jin Boyang	—	—	—
Chinese Taipei	—	Amanda Hsu	—	—
Czech Republic	—	Eliška Březinová	—	—
Finland	—	Emmi Peltonen	—	—
France	Kévin Aymoz	—	Camille Kovalev / Pavel Kovalev	Evgenia Lopareva / Geoffrey Brissaud
Great Britain	—	—	Anastasia Vaipan-Law / Luke Digby	—
Israel	Mark Gorodnitsky	Ella Chen	—	—
Israel	—	Elizabet Gervits	—	—
Italy	Nikolaj Memola	—	—	Leia Dozzi / Pietro Papetti
Japan	Sōta Yamamoto	Mone Chiba	Riku Miura / Ryuichi Kihara	—
Japan	—	Kaori Sakamoto	—	—
Mexico	Donovan Carrillo	Andrea Astrain Maynez	—	—
Mexico	—	Eugenia Garza	—	—
Philippines	Edrian Paul Celestino	Sofia Frank	Isabella Gamez / Alexander Korovin	—
South Korea	—	Choi Da-bin	—	Hannah Lim / Ye Quan
Spain	Tomàs-Llorenç Guarino Sabaté	—	—	Olivia Smart / Tim Dieck
United States	Jimmy Ma	Audrey Shin	Chelsea Liu / Balázs Nagy	Eva Pate / Logan Bye
United States	Ilia Malinin	—	Isabelle Martins / Ryan Bedard	Katarina Wolfkostin / Dimitry Tsarevski

=== Changes to preliminary assignments ===
Date	Discipline	Withdrew	Added	Ref.
August 21	Men	—	(Canada) Stephen Gogolev	
August 21	Women	—	(Canada) Justine Miclette	
August 21	Women	—	(Mexico) Andrea Astrain Maynez	
September 5	Women	(South Korea) Kim Min-chae	—	
September 5	Ice dance	(Lithuania) Allison Reed / Saulius Ambrulevičius	—	
September 6	Ice dance	(Canada) Marjorie Lajoie / Zachary Lagha	—	
September 7	Pairs	(Australia) Anastasia Golubeva / Hektor Giotopoulos Moore	—	
September 8	Women	(United States) Lindsay Thorngren	—	
September 9	Women	(United States) Bradie Tennell	—	
September 11	Women	(Romania) Tara-Maria Ienciu	—	
September 14	Men	(United States) Daniil Murzin	—	
September 14	Ice dance	(Ukraine) Mariia Holubtsova / Kyryl Bielobrov	—	

== Results ==
=== Men's singles ===
Rank	Skater	Nation	Total points	SP		FS	
1st place, gold medalist(s)	Ilia Malinin	United States	281.68	1	100.87	1	180.81
2nd place, silver medalist(s)	Kévin Aymoz	France	237.35	6	72.58	2	164.77
3rd place, bronze medalist(s)	Stephen Gogolev	Canada	233.26	2	86.25	5	147.01
4	Sōta Yamamoto	Japan	231.23	7	70.39	3	160.84
5	Jin Boyang	China	230.99	4	79.32	4	151.67
6	Mark Gorodnitsky	Israel	213.12	5	73.46	6	139.66
7	Wesley Chiu	Canada	208.82	3	80.93	8	127.89
8	Nikolaj Memola	Italy	199.38	8	70.27	7	129.11
9	Jimmy Ma	United States	191.08	9	66.03	9	125.05
10	Edrian Paul Celestino	Philippines	177.57	10	59.02	10	118.55
11	Donovan Carrillo	Mexico	153.68	12	49.15	11	104.53
12	Tomàs-Llorenç Guarino Sabaté	Spain	151.36	11	55.04	12	96.32

=== Women's singles ===
Rank	Skater	Nation	Total points	SP		FS	
1st place, gold medalist(s)	Kaori Sakamoto	Japan	203.20	1	75.62	1	127.58
2nd place, silver medalist(s)	Kaiya Ruiter	Canada	172.68	4	58.87	2	113.81
3rd place, bronze medalist(s)	Justine Miclette	Canada	169.24	3	59.45	3	109.79
4	Audrey Shin	United States	169.04	2	60.07	4	108.97
5	Choi Da-bin	South Korea	163.26	5	58.60	5	104.66
6	Mone Chiba	Japan	160.25	6	57.66	6	102.59
7	Emmi Peltonen	Finland	139.87	10	45.51	7	94.36
8	Elizabet Gervits	Israel	134.71	8	48.45	8	86.26
9	Sofia Frank	Philippines	128.93	9	48.02	9	80.91
10	Eliška Březinová	Czech Republic	125.56	7	49.84	11	75.72
11	Andrea Astrain Maynez	Mexico	118.41	12	39.16	10	79.25
12	Amanda Hsu	Chinese Taipei	113.60	11	40.65	12	72.95
13	Ella Chen	Israel	109.43	13	37.86	13	71.67
14	Eugenia Garza	Mexico	91.37	14	30.51	14	60.86

=== Pairs ===
Rank	Team	Nation	Total points	SP		FS	
1st place, gold medalist(s)	Deanna Stellato-Dudek / Maxime Deschamps	Canada	203.62	1	71.80	1	131.82
2nd place, silver medalist(s)	Riku Miura / Ryuichi Kihara	Japan	188.05	2	59.13	2	128.92
3rd place, bronze medalist(s)	Emmanuelle Proft / Nicolas Nadeau	Canada	165.39	3	58.44	5	106.95
4	Chelsea Liu / Balázs Nagy	United States	165.20	4	56.09	3	109.11
5	Anastasia Vaipan-Law / Luke Digby	Great Britain	159.82	6	52.64	4	107.18
6	Isabelle Martins / Ryan Bedard	United States	152.64	7	51.49	6	101.15
7	Sophia Schaller / Livio Mayr	Austria	150.35	8	50.94	7	99.41
8	Caidence Derenisky / Raine Eberl	Canada	148.02	5	52.76	9	95.26
9	Camille Kovalev / Pavel Kovalev	France	146.63	9	47.87	8	98.76
10	Isabella Gamez / Alexander Korovin	Philippines	122.65	10	37.40	10	85.25

=== Ice dance ===
Rank	Team	Nation	Total points	RD		FD	
1st place, gold medalist(s)	Eva Pate / Logan Bye	United States	191.20	1	77.02	2	114.18
2nd place, silver medalist(s)	Evgeniia Lopareva / Geoffrey Brissaud	France	186.94	2	72.28	1	114.66
3rd place, bronze medalist(s)	Hannah Lim / Ye Quan	South Korea	170.70	4	68.05	3	102.65
4	Olivia Smart / Tim Dieck	Spain	169.11	3	72.27	5	96.81
5	Katarina Wolfkostin / Dimitry Tsarevski	United States	163.34	5	66.43	4	96.91
6	Sandrine Gauthier / Quentin Thieren	Canada	154.78	6	58.98	6	95.80
7	Holly Harris / Jason Chan	Australia	142.63	7	58.33	8	84.30
8	Leia Dozzi / Pietro Papetti	Italy	141.34	8	52.64	7	88.70
9	Alyssa Robinson / Jacob Portz	Canada	134.30	9	51.38	9	82.92
