= Anastasia Vaipan-Law =

British pair skater (born 1999)

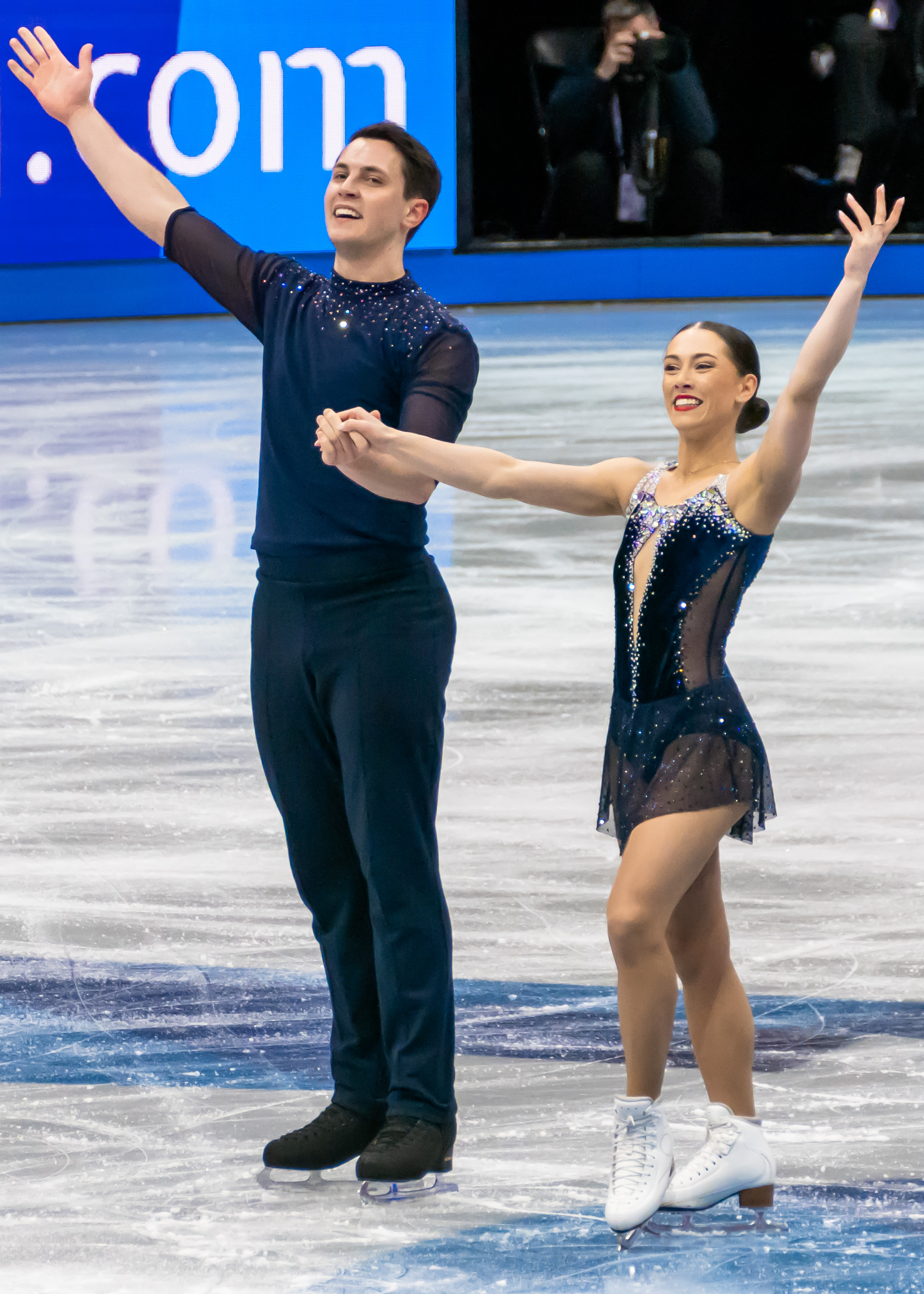
- Anastasia Vaipan-Law and Luke Digby at the 2025 World Championships

Personal information
- Full name: Anastasia Kristina Vaipan-Law
- Other names: Anastasia Vaypan-Law
- Born: 31 August 1999 (age 27) Blackpool, England, United Kingdom
- Height: 1.52 m (5 ft 0 in)

Figure skating career
- Country: Great Britain
- Discipline: Pair skating (since 2021); Women's singles (2013–19)
- Partner: Luke Digby
- Coach: Simon Briggs; Debi Briggs; Jason Briggs
- Skating club: Dundee Ice Skating Club
- Began skating: 2007

Medal record
British Championships
Gold medal – first place	2022 Sheffield	Pairs
Gold medal – first place	2023 Sheffield	Pairs
Gold medal – first place	2024 Sheffield	Pairs
Gold medal – first place	2025 Sheffield	Pairs

Anastasia Kristina Vaipan-Law (born 31 August 1999) is a British retired figure skater who represented Great Britain in pairs. With her former partner, Luke Digby, she is a five-time British national champion (2022–2026) and the 2024 CS Warsaw Cup silver medalist.

== Personal life ==
Vaipan-Law was born on 31 August 1999 in Blackpool, England to an English mother and Ukrainian father. She has a younger sister, Daria, who is also a figure skater.

== Career ==
=== Early years and singles career ===
Vaipan-Law began learning how to skate in 2007 at the age of eight. When she was thirteen, she made the move to Dundee to work with coaches, Simon and Debbie Briggs.

She went on to make her junior international debut in women's single skating at the 2013 NRW Trophy in December 2013 where she finished twenty-first.

Throughout her career as a single skater, Vaipan-Law competed at three ISU Junior Grand Prix assignments and placed second at the 2016 Open d'Andorra in the junior women's event. She is a three-time British junior national silver medalist (2017-2019).

=== Pair skating career ===
==== 2021–22 season: Pairs debut with Digby ====
Vaipan-Law began contemplating switching to pair skating after suffering a knee injury and undergoing surgery. She officially began her pair skating career in December 2019 when she teamed up with fellow singles skater, Luke Digby.

Vaipan-Law/Digby made their international debut as a team at the 2021 CS Finlandia Trophy. They finished twelfth overall and recorded personal bests in all three segments of competition. The team competed at three more events throughout the fall, winning the 2021 Tayside Trophy and finishing fourth at both the 2021 Trophée Métropole Nice Côte d'Azur and the 2021 CS Warsaw Cup respectively.

At their first British Championships in November, Vaipan-Law/Digby narrowly took the title ahead of the long-dominant team Jones/Boyadji. Jones/Boyadji initially received the assignment to Great Britain's single berth in the pairs' field at the 2022 European Figure Skating Championships, but after Jones recorded a positive COVID-19 test shortly before the event, Vaipan-Law/Digby were assigned to replace them.

Vaipan-Law/Digby set a new personal best in the short program at the 2022 European Championships but finished eighteenth in the segment and did not advance to the free skate.

==== 2022–23 season: World Championship debut ====
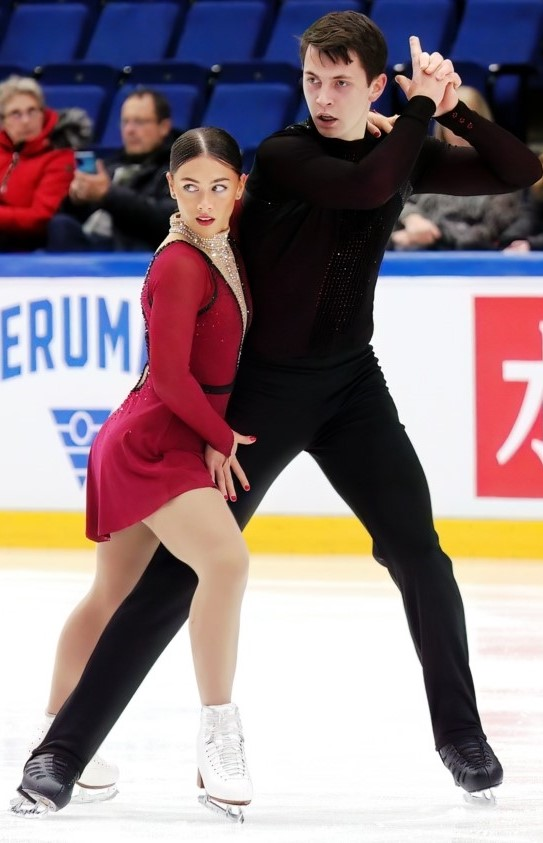
Vaipan-Law and Digby at the 2022 MK John Wilson Trophy

Vaipan-Law/Digby began the 2022–23 figure skating season with a tenth-place finish at the 2022 CS Finlandia Trophy and a silver medal at the 2022 Tayside Trophy. On the 2022-23 ISU Grand Prix, they were the host-picked pair team for the 2022 MK John Wilson Trophy in Sheffield, where they finished seventh. Following this, the pair finished seventh at the 2022 CS Warsaw Cup.

Vaipan-Law/Digby went on to defend their title at the 2023 British Championships and were selected to compete at the European and World Championships. The pair finished in tenth place at the European Championships in Espoo, Finland. They then went on to place tenth at the 2023 International Challenge Cup.

Making their World Championship debut in Saitama, Japan, Vaipan-Law/Digby qualified for the free skate after placing seventeenth in the short program and went on to place sixteenth in the free skate, finishing in sixteenth place overall.

==== 2023–24 season ====
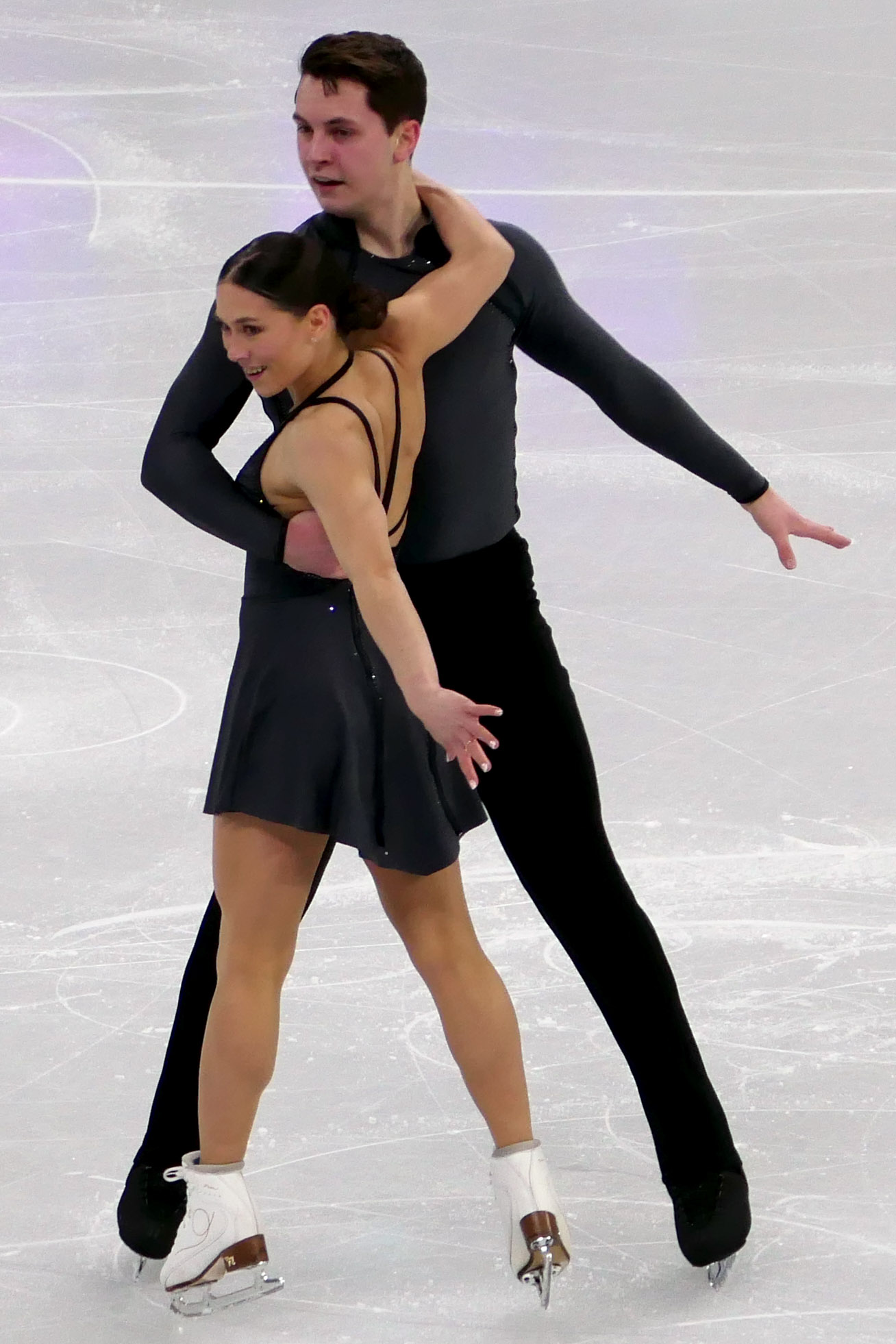
Vaipan-Law and Digby during their short program at the 2024 World Championships

Beginning the season with two Challenger series assignments, Vaipan-Law/Digby came eighth at the 2023 CS Lombardia Trophy and fifth at the 2023 CS Autumn Classic International. They received an unexpected opportunity to compete on the Grand Prix when reigning world champions Miura/Kihara withdrew from the 2023 Skate America. They finished seventh at the event. Vaipan-Law/Digby subsequently took gold at the 2024 British Championships for a third time.

In January, the pair finished ninth at the 2024 European Championships. At the 2024 World Championships, they attempted a more difficult jump in the short program than at the European Championships. Despite a mistake on it, they qualified for the free skate, and they ended in twentieth place.

==== 2024–25 season ====
Vaipan-Law/Digby started the season by finishing sixth at the 2024 CS Nebelhorn Trophy. Going on to compete on the 2024–25 Grand Prix series, the pair placed sixth at 2024 Skate America, earning personal best scores in the process. “We feel like we are exactly at the right place we want to be at this point of the season,” said Digby. “We now want to keep the level, and of course, keep improving.” They subsequently placed sixth at the 2024 NHK Trophy.

In late November, the pair won their first ISU medal, a silver at the 2024 CS Warsaw Cup before going on to win their fourth consecutive national title at the 2025 British Championships.

Going on to compete at the 2025 European Championships in Tallinn, Estonia, Vaipan-Law/Digby placed fourth in the short program. On the day of the free skate, Vaipan-Law took a fall on a lift and paramedics were called onto the scene. Medically cleared to compete that day, Vaipan-Law/Digby placed sixth in the free skate segment and finished fifth overall. Delighted with the result, Vaipan-Law said in an interview following the event, "If someone would have told me that I would be top five at Europeans, I would have probably said, ‘yeah, that’s a good one.' Our goal was to make top 10." The team also talked about their next goals and the steps needed to close the gap to the top teams next season.

The following month, they competed at the 2025 World Championships in Boston, Massachusetts, United States, where the placed twelfth overall after finishing thirteenth in the short program and eleventh in the free skate. With this placement, Vaipan-Law/Digby won Great Britain a quota for pair skating at the 2026 Winter Olympics.

==== 2025–26 season: Milano Cortina Olympics ====
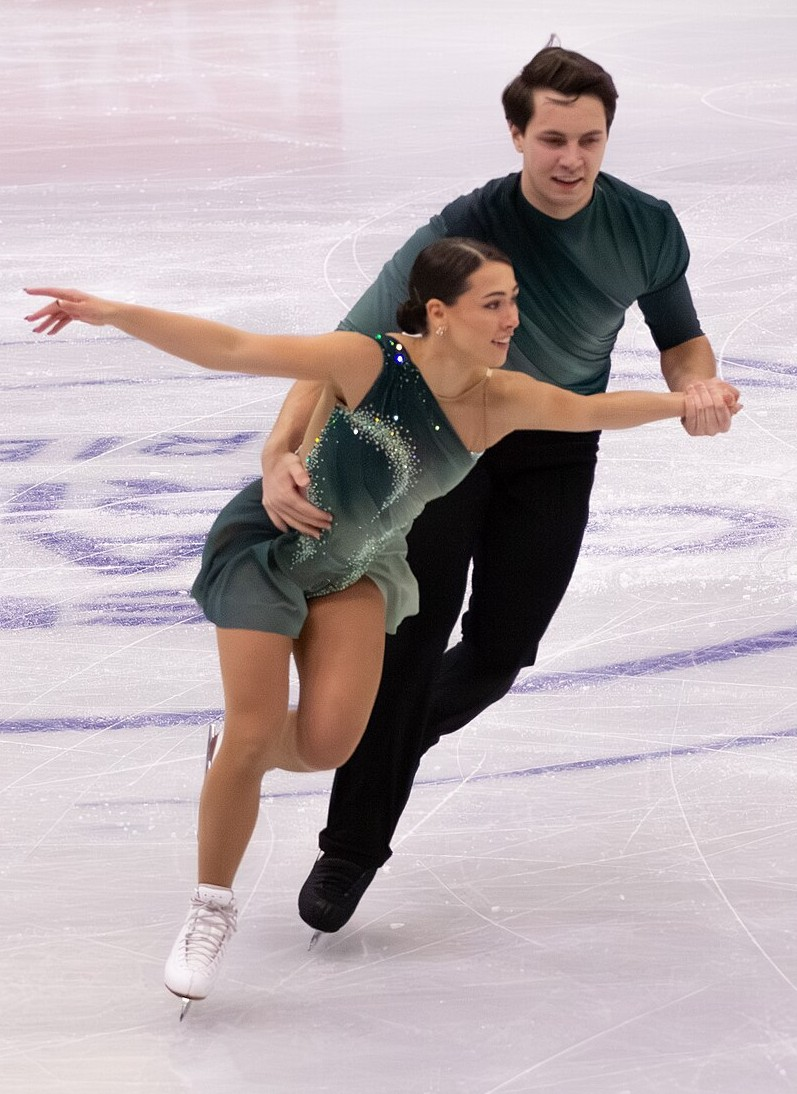
Vaipan-Law/Digby during their short program at 2025 Skate Canada International

Vaipan-Law/Digby opened the season by competing on the 2025–26 Challenger Series, placing eleventh at the 2025 CS Nebelhorn Trophy and fifth at the 2025 CS Trialeti Trophy. Selected to compete at 2025 Skate Canada International, the pair placed eighth of the eight pair teams in the short program after missing their opening split triple twist. They rallied back with a strong free skate, however, placing fourth in that segment and moving up to sixth place overall. Vaipan-Law/Digby then went on to win silver at the 2025 Warsaw Cup.

In December, the team won their fifth consecutive national title at the 2026 British Championships. Following the event, Vaipan-Law and Digby were named in the Great Britain team for the 2026 Winter Olympics. The following month, the pair competed at the 2026 European Championships in Digby's hometown of Sheffield, England, United Kingdom. They placed fifth in the short program and ninth in the free skate to finish seventh overall. "It wasn’t quite the best performance we could put out there," Digby admitted. "But overall we are proud of what we were able to do in front of that home crowd. Still such special moments that will last for a lifetime."

On February 6, Vaipan-Law and Digby competed in the 2026 Winter Olympics Figure Skating Team Event where they placed ninth in the short program. “Stepping onto the Olympic ice was a really special feeling and something we truly enjoyed,” said Vaipan-Law. “Unfortunately, today was a bit of a mixed performance for us, but that’s something we’ll take forward and work hard on over the next week.” In the individual event, they placed 13th in the short program and 15th in the free skate, to finish 15th. They closed the season at the 2026 World Figure Skating Championships in Prague, finishing 13th. In April, they announced the end of their partnership, because Digby had retired.

== Programs ==
=== Pair skating with Luke Digby ===
Season	Short program	Free skating	Exhibition
2025–2026	Lighthouse by Patrick Watson choreo. by Christopher Dean; Fix You by Coldplay choreo. by Mark Hanretty	Arrival of the Birds by The Cinematic Orchestra & Rob Colling; Carry You by Ruelle ft. Fleurie choreo. by Mark Hanretty	Angels; Rock DJ by Robbie Williams
2024–2025	Lighthouse by Patrick Watson choreo. by Christopher Dean	Arrival of the Birds by The Cinematic Orchestra & Rob Colling; Carry You by Ruelle ft. Fleurie choreo. by Mark Hanretty	I Lived by OneRepublic; Your Song (from Moulin Rouge!) performed by Ewan McGregor & Alessandro Safina
2023–2024	Never Tear Us Apart by INXS performed by Bishop Briggs choreo. by Mark Pillay	Survivor by Destiny's Child performed by 2WEI ft. Edda Hayes; Gangsta's Paradise by Coolio ft. L.V. performed by 2WEI choreo. by Christopher Dean	Never Tear Us Apart by INXS performed by Bishop Briggs choreo. by Mark Pillay
2022–2023	Never Tear Us Apart by INXS performed by Bishop Briggs choreo. by Mark Pillay	The Eternal City; Los Muertos Vivos Estan by Thomas Newman; Writing's on the Wall (from Spectre) by Sam Smith; The Name's Bond...James Bond (from Casino Royale) by David Arnold choreo. by Andrew Smith	Another Love by Tom Odell
2021–2022	Ghost: The Musical; Unchained Melody (Dance) / The Love Inside; Sam's Murder by Bruce Joel Rubin, Dave Stewart, & Glen Ballard choreo. by Andrew Smith	The Eternal City; Los Muertos Vivos Estan by Thomas Newman; Writing's on the Wall (from Spectre) by Sam Smith; The Name's Bond...James Bond (from Casino Royale) by David Arnold choreo. by Andrew Smith	
2020–2021	Ghost: The Musical; Unchained Melody (Dance) / The Love Inside; Sam's Murder by Bruce Joel Rubin, Dave Stewart, & Glen Ballard choreo. by Andrew Smith	Writing's on the Wall (from Spectre) by Sam Smith; No Time to Die (from No Time to Die) by Billie Eilish; Skyfall (from Skyfall) by Adele choreo. by Andrew Smith	

== Competitive highlights ==
- GP – Event of the ISU Grand Prix Series
- JGP – Event of the ISU Junior Grand Prix Series
- CS – Event of the ISU Challenger Series
- TBD – Assigned
- WD – Withdrew from competition
- Medals at team events are awarded for the team results only. Individual placements at team events are listed in parentheses.

=== Pair skating with Luke Digby ===
Competition placements at senior level
Season	2021–22	2022–23	2023–24	2024–25	2025–26
Winter Olympics					15th
Winter Olympics (Team event)					9th (9th)
World Championships		16th	20th	12th	13th
European Championships	18th	10th	9th	5th	7th
British Championships	1st	1st	1st	1st	1st
GP NHK Trophy				6th	
GP Skate America			7th	6th	
GP Skate Canada					6th
GP Wilson Trophy		7th			
CS Autumn Classic			5th		
CS Finlandia Trophy	12th	10th			
CS Lombardia Trophy			8th		
CS Nebelhorn Trophy				6th	11th
CS Warsaw Cup	17th	7th	2nd	2nd	
Challenge Cup		10th			
Tayside Trophy	1st	2nd	2nd	2nd	5th
Trophée Métropole Nice	4th				
Warsaw Cup					2nd

=== Women's singles ===
Competition placements at junior level
Season	2013–14	2014–15	2015–16	2016–17	2017–18	2018–19
British Championships (Senior)			11th			
British Championships (Junior)	3rd	8th		2nd	2nd	2nd
JGP Austria						17th
JGP Croatia					15th	
JGP Slovenia						14th
Alpen Trophy						4th
Cup of Nice			13th		16th	
Golden Bear of Zagreb						11th
Merano Cup					4th	
NRW Trophy	21st					
Open d'Andorra				2nd		
Skate Helena				5th		
Sportland Trophy			8th			
Volvo Open Cup			26th		4th	

== Detailed results ==
=== Pair skating with Luke Digby ===
ISU personal best scores in the +5/-5 GOE System
Segment	Type	Score	Event
Total	TSS	183.76	2025 European Championships
Short program	TSS	66.54	2024 CS Warsaw Cup
Short program	TES	37.15	2024 CS Warsaw Cup
Short program	PCS	29.70	2026 World Championships
Free skating	TSS	119.09	2025 Skate Canada International
Free skating	TES	63.72	2025 Skate Canada International
Free skating	PCS	59.97	2025 European Championships

Results in the 2021–22 season
Date	Event	SP		FS		Total	
Date	Event	P	Score	P	Score	P	Score
Oct 7–10, 2021	(Finland) 2021 CS Finlandia Trophy	13	45.79	12	86.77	12	132.56
Oct 20–24, 2021	(France) 2021 Trophée Métropole Nice Côte d'Azur	4	40.72	4	81.33	4	122.05
Nov 6–7, 2021	(United Kingdom) 2021 Tayside Trophy	1	57.56	1	101.37	1	158.93
Nov 30 – Dec 5, 2021	(United Kingdom) 2022 British Championships	1	50.49	2	91.42	1	141.91
Jan 10–16, 2022	(Estonia) 2022 European Championships	18	51.11	—N/a	—N/a	18	51.11

Results in the 2022–23 season
Date	Event	SP		FS		Total	
Date	Event	P	Score	P	Score	P	Score
Oct 4–9, 2022	(Finland) 2022 CS Finlandia Trophy	10	40.79	10	70.89	10	111.68
Oct 15–16, 2022	(United Kingdom) 2022 Tayside Trophy	2	52.31	2	93.19	2	145.50
Nov 11–13, 2022	(Poland) 2022 MK John Wilson Trophy	7	50.29	6	93.52	7	143.81
Nov 17–20, 2022	(Poland) 2022 CS Warsaw Cup	8	48.30	7	99.56	7	147.86
Dec 1–4, 2023	(United Kingdom) 2023 British Championships	1	55.20	1	105.76	1	160.96
Jan 25–29, 2023	(Finland) 2023 European Championships	9	49.43	10	88.06	10	137.49
Feb 23–26, 2023	(Netherlands) 2023 International Challenge Cup	10	41.12	10	85.81	10	126.93
Mar 22–26, 2023	(Japan) 2023 World Championships	17	55.42	16	97.96	16	153.38

Results in the 2023–24 season
Date	Event	SP		FS		Total	
Date	Event	P	Score	P	Score	P	Score
Sep 8–10, 2023	(Italy) 2023 CS Lombardia Trophy	6	55.32	10	87.65	8	142.97
Sep 14–17, 2023	(Canada) 2023 CS Autumn Classic International	6	52.64	4	107.18	5	159.82
Oct 14–15, 2023	(United Kingdom) 2023 Tayside Trophy	3	50.70	2	107.59	2	158.29
Oct 20–22, 2023	(United States) 2023 Skate America	6	50.60	7	83.24	7	133.84
Nov 16–19, 2023	(Poland) 2023 Warsaw Cup	2	61.84	3	102.50	2	164.34
Jan 8–14, 2024	(Lithuania) 2024 European Championships	8	56.79	9	102.22	9	159.01
Mar 18–24, 2024	(Canada) 2024 World Championships	20	54.69	20	98.37	20	153.06

Results in the 2024–25 season
Date	Event	SP		FS		Total	
Date	Event	P	Score	P	Score	P	Score
Sep 19–21, 2024	(Germany) 2024 CS Nebelhorn Trophy	6	60.05	4	114.63	6	174.68
Oct 12–13, 2024	(United Kingdom) 2024 Tayside Trophy	2	61.96	2	109.80	2	171.76
Oct 18–20, 2024	(United States) 2024 Skate America	6	61.31	6	118.82	6	180.13
Nov 8–10, 2024	(Japan) 2024 NHK Trophy	7	58.17	6	116.28	6	174.45
Nov 20–24, 2024	(Poland) 2024 CS Warsaw Cup	2	66.54	2	115.83	2	182.37
Nov 27 – Dec 1, 2024	(United Kingdom) 2025 British Championships	1	65.28	1	123.39	1	188.67
Jan 28 – Feb 2, 2025	(Estonia) 2025 European Championships	4	64.83	6	118.93	5	183.76
Mar 25–30, 2025	(United States) 2025 World Championships	13	61.01	11	117.61	12	178.62

Results in the 2025–26 season
Date	Event	SP		FS		Total	
Date	Event	P	Score	P	Score	P	Score
Sep 25–27, 2025	(Germany) 2025 CS Nebelhorn Trophy	12	60.05	11	104.97	11	165.02
Oct 11–12, 2025	(United Kingdom) 2025 Tayside Trophy	4	63.68	5	108.63	5	172.31
Oct 31 – Nov 2, 2025	2025 Skate Canada International	8	48.85	4	119.09	6	167.94
Nov 19–23, 2025	(Poland) 2025 Warsaw Cup	2	61.31	2	101.19	2	162.50
Nov 26–30, 2025	(United Kingdom) 2026 British Championships	1	72.07	1	128.84	1	199.91
Jan 13–18, 2026	(United Kingdom) 2026 European Championships	5	63.98	9	109.54	7	173.52
Feb 6–8, 2026	(Italy) 2026 Winter Olympics – Team event	9	57.29	—N/a	—N/a	9	—N/a
Feb 6–19, 2026	(Italy) 2026 Winter Olympics	13	66.07	16	112.99	15	179.06
Mar 24–29, 2026	(Czech Republic) 2026 World Championships	9	66.34	15	109.99	13	176.33
