= 2024 CS Nebelhorn Trophy =

Figure skating competition in Germany

- Type: ISU Challenger Series
- Date: September 19 – 21
- Season: 2024–25
- Location: Oberstdorf, Germany
- Host: Deutsche Eislauf Union
- Venue: Eissportzentrum Oberstdorf

Champions
- Men's singles: (Japan) Sōta Yamamoto
- Women's singles: (United States) Elyce Lin-Gracey
- Pairs: (Germany) Minerva Fabienne Hase and Nikita Volodin
- Ice dance: (United Kingdom) Lilah Fear and Lewis Gibson
- Previous: 2023 CS Nebelhorn Trophy
- Next: 2025 CS Nebelhorn Trophy
- Previous CS: 2024 CS Lombardia Trophy
- Next CS: 2024 CS Denis Ten Memorial Challenge

The 2024 CS Nebelhorn Trophy was held on September 19–21, 2024, in Oberstdorf, Germany. It was part of the 2024–25 ISU Challenger Series. Medals were awarded in men's singles, women's singles, pair skating, and ice dance.

== Entries ==
The International Skating Union published the list of entries on August 26, 2024.

Country	Men	Women	Pairs	Ice dance
Armenia	Fedor Chitipakhovian	—		
Australia	—			Romy Malcolm; Kobi Chant
Austria	—	Olga Mikutina	Sophia Schaller; Livio Mayr	—
Azerbaijan	—			Samantha Ritter; Daniel Brykalov
Belgium	—	Jade Hovine	—	
Canada	Wesley Chiu	Sara-Maude Dupuis	Lia Pereira; Trennt Michaud	—
Canada	Roman Sadovsky	Madeline Schizas	Deanna Stellato-Dudek; Maxime Deschamps	—
Chinese Taipei	Li Yu-Hsiang	—		
Croatia	Jari Kessler	—		
Cyprus	—			Angelina Kudryavtseva; Ilia Karankevich
Czech Republic	Georgii Reshtenko	—		Natálie Taschlerová; Filip Taschler
Czech Republic	Filip Scerba	—		—
Finland	—	Janna Jyrkinen	—	
Finland	—	Olivia Lisko	—	
Great Britain	Edward Appleby	—	Anastasia Vaipan-Law; Luke Digby	Lilah Fear; Lewis Gibson
Germany	Nikita Starostin	Sarah Marie Pesch	Minerva Fabienne Hase; Nikita Volodin	—
Germany	—		Letizia Roscher; Luis Schuster	—
Israel	Mark Gorodnitsky	Elizabet Gervits	—	Shira Ichilov; Dmytriy Kravchenko
Israel	Lev Vinokur	Mariia Seniuk	—	Mariia Nosovitskaya; Mikhail Nosovitskiy
Italy	Gabriele Frangipani	—		Leia Dozzi; Pietro Papetti
Italy	Matteo Nalbone	—		—
Japan	Sōta Yamamoto	Mone Chiba	—	Utana Yoshida; Masaya Morita
Japan	—	Hana Yoshida	—	—
Kazakhstan	Dias Jirenbayev	—		
Latvia	Deniss Vasiļjevs	Sofja Stepčenko	—	
Malaysia	Ze Zeng Fang	Katherine Ong Pui Kuan	—	
North Korea	Ri Ju-won	—	Ryom Tae-ok; Han Kum-chol	—
North Korea	Ro Yong-myong	—	—	—
Norway	—	Mia Risa Gomez	—	
Poland	—			Olexandra Borysova; Aaron Freeman
Slovakia	—			Anna Simova; Kirill Aksenov
Slovenia	—	Julija Lovrencic	—	
South Africa	—		Julia Mauder; Johannes Wilkinson	—
South Korea	Cha Jun-hwan	Wi Seo-yeong	—	
Spain	—	Emilia Murdock	—	Athena Faith Roberts; Eric Alis
Spain	—	—	—	Olivia Smart; Tim Dieck
Spain	—	—	—	Sofía Val; Asaf Kazimov
Sweden	—	Josefin Brovall	Greta Crafoord; John Crafoord	—
Sweden	—	Julia Brovall	—	—
Switzerland	—	Livia Kaiser	—	
Switzerland	—	Kimmy Repond	—	
Turkey	Burak Demirboğa	—		
Ukraine	—			Mariia Pinchuk; Mykyta Pogorielov
United States	Maxim Naumov	Isabeau Levito	Ellie Kam; Daniel O'Shea	Christina Carreira; Anthony Ponomarenko
United States	Andrew Torgashev	Elyce Lin-Gracey	Alisa Efimova; Misha Mitrofanov	Emilea Zingas; Vadym Kolesnik

=== Changes to preliminary entries ===
Date	Discipline	Withdrew	Ref.
September 3	Men	(Germany); Arthur Wolfgang Mai	
September 3	Women	(Israel); Julia Fennell	
September 3	Women	(Netherlands); Julia Van Dijk	
September 3	Women	(Norway); Linnea Kilsand	
September 3	Ice dance	(Israel); Elizabeth Tkachenko; Alexei Kiliakov	
September 3	Ice dance	(Japan); Azusa Tanaka; Shingo Nishiyama	
September 11	Men	(Canada); Stephen Gogolev	
September 11	Men	(Hong Kong); Chiu Hei Cheung	
September 11	Pairs	(Netherlands); Daria Danilova; Michel Tsiba	
September 11	Ice dance	(Canada); Marjorie Lajoie; Zachary Lagha	
September 13	Men	(United Kingdom); Ken Fitterer	
September 13	Pairs	(Uzbekistan); Ekaterina Geynish; Dmitrii Chigirev	
September 19	Men	(Turkey); Ali Efe Gunes	

== Results ==
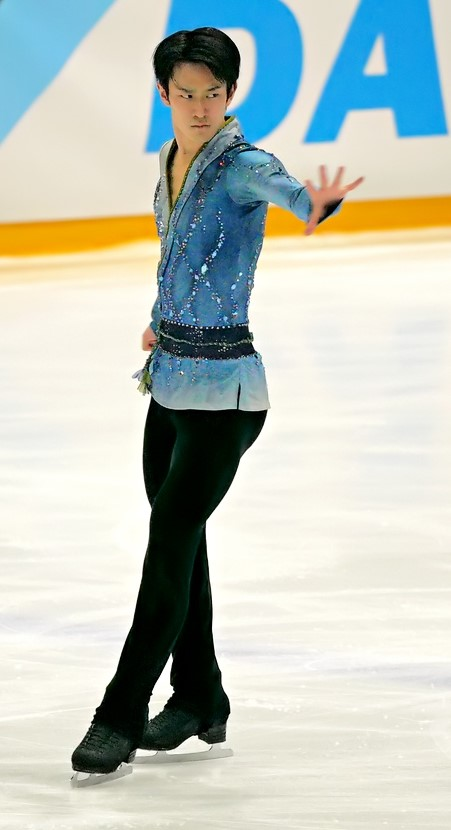
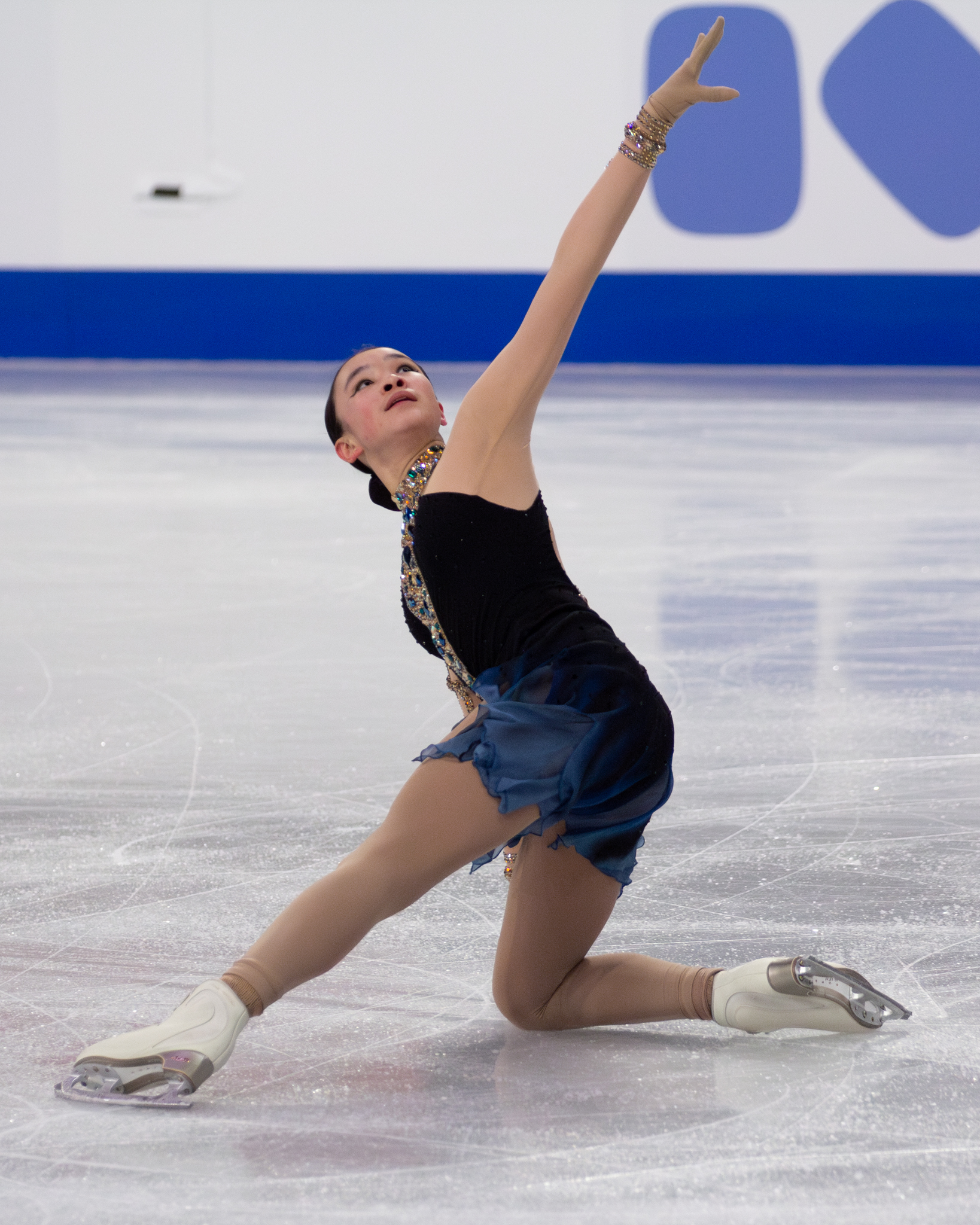
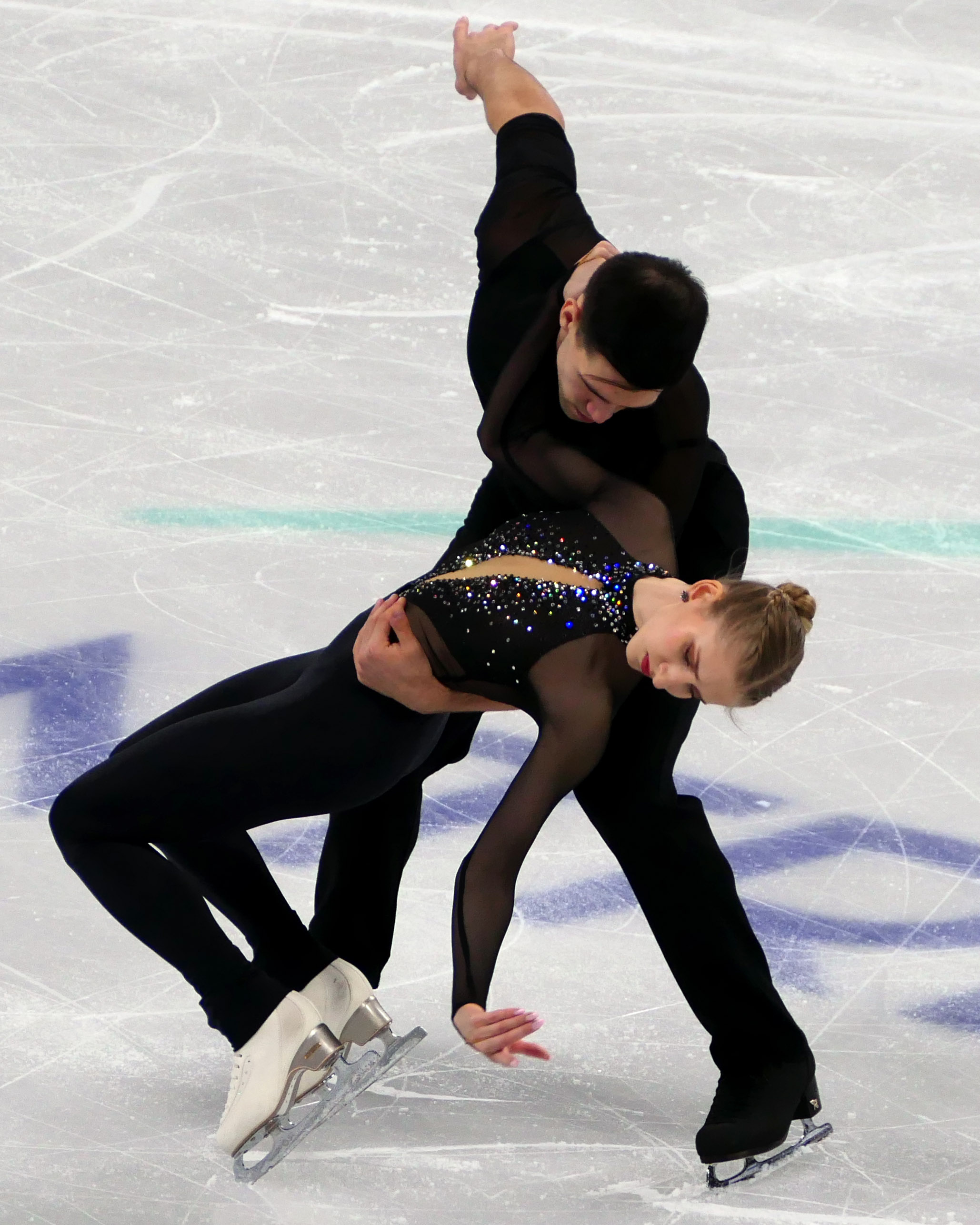
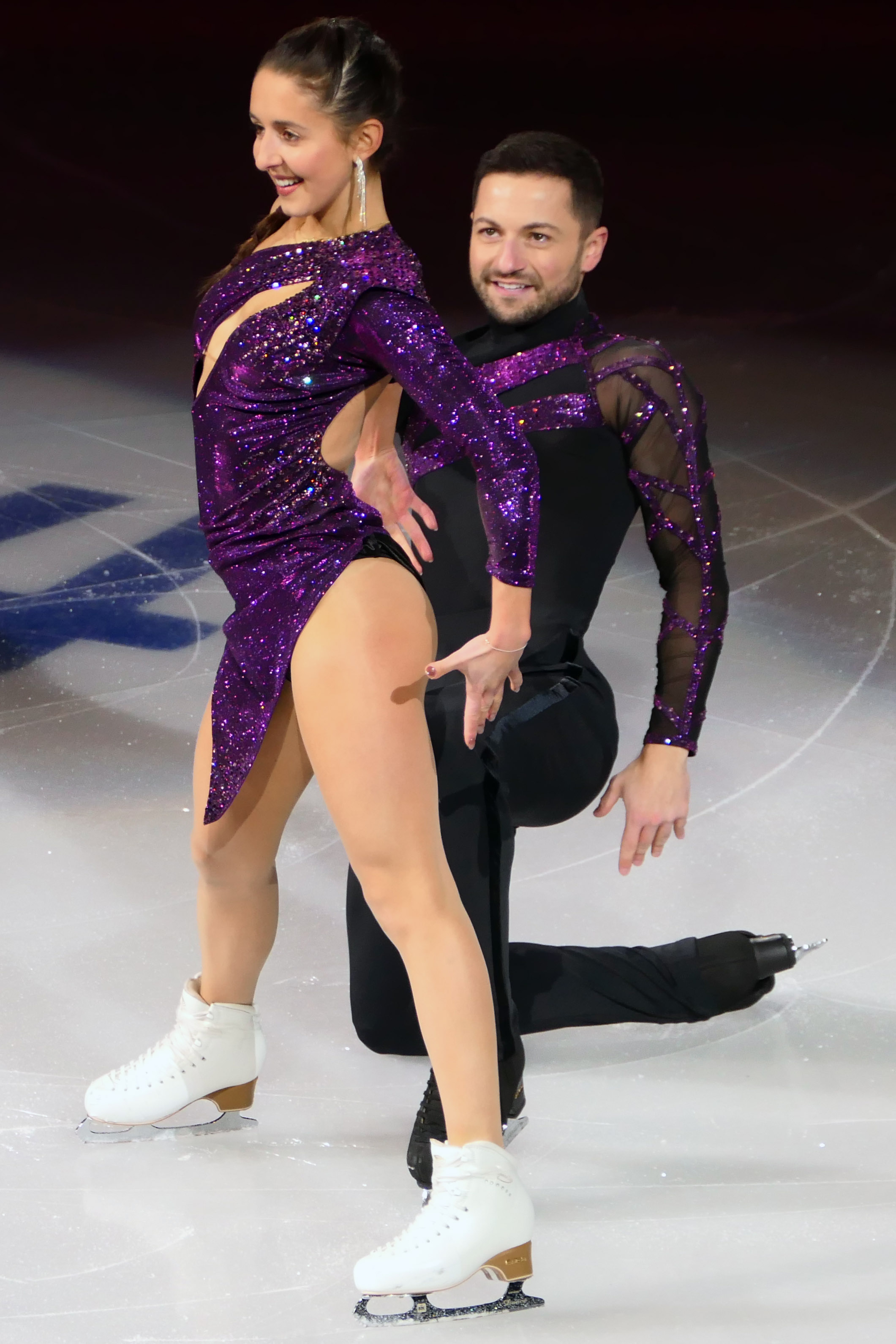
The 2024 Nebelhorn Trophy champions: Sōta Yamamoto of Japan (men's singles); Elyce Lin-Gracey of the United States (women's singles); Minerva Fabienne Hase and Nikita Volodin of Germany (pair skating); and Lilah Fear and Lewis Gibson of Great Britain (ice dance)

=== Men's singles ===
Men's results
Rank	Skater	Nation	Total points	SP		FS	
1st place, gold medalist(s)	Sōta Yamamoto	Japan	262.72	3	79.00	1	183.72
2nd place, silver medalist(s)	Gabriele Frangipani	Italy	246.11	2	79.18	2	166.93
3rd place, bronze medalist(s)	Deniss Vasiļjevs	Latvia	235.72	1	83.78	5	151.94
4	Cha Jun-hwan	South Korea	228.48	10	69.81	3	158.67
5	Roman Sadovsky	Canada	225.24	8	71.99	4	153.25
6	Edward Appleby	Great Britain	216.48	5	74.02	7	142.46
7	Mark Gorodnitsky	Israel	213.27	4	74.04	9	139.23
8	Lev Vinokur	Israel	208.90	9	70.61	10	138.29
9	Andrew Torgashev	United States	207.65	14	63.92	6	143.73
10	Ro Yong-myong	North Korea	205.62	13	65.74	8	139.88
11	Maxim Naumov	United States	199.30	15	63.01	11	139.29
12	Jari Kessler	Croatia	191.73	12	69.59	13	122.14
13	Georgii Reshtenko	Czech Republic	191.25	7	72.86	14	118.39
14	Wesley Chiu	Canada	189.77	6	73.46	16	116.31
15	Dias Jirenbayev	Kazakhstan	183.97	11	69.60	17	114.37
16	Nikita Starostin	Germany	181.44	20	56.32	12	125.12
17	Burak Demirboğa	Turkey	177.90	17	59.98	15	117.92
18	Matteo Nalbone	Italy	171.87	16	61.18	20	110.69
19	Filip Ščerba	Czech Republic	170.49	18	58.60	18	111.89
20	Li Yu-hsiang	Chinese Taipei	169.36	19	57.87	19	111.49
21	Ri Ju-won	North Korea	150.83	21	55.10	21	95.73
22	Fang Ze Zang	Malaysia	138.24	22	45.61	22	92.63

=== Women's singles ===
Women's results
Rank	Skater	Nation	Total points	SP		FS	
1st place, gold medalist(s)	Elyce Lin-Gracey	United States	213.33	1	71.16	1	142.17
2nd place, silver medalist(s)	Isabeau Levito	United States	198.13	5	61.30	2	136.83
3rd place, bronze medalist(s)	Hana Yoshida	Japan	196.47	7	59.65	3	136.82
4	Mone Chiba	Japan	193.37	2	67.95	5	125.42
5	Livia Kaiser	Switzerland	191.24	3	62.87	4	128.37
6	Kimmy Repond	Switzerland	172.32	10	53.45	6	118.87
7	Madeline Schizas	Canada	172.22	6	60.61	7	111.61
8	Janna Jyrkinen	Finland	168.82	8	57.24	8	111.58
9	Sara-Maude Dupuis	Canada	166.31	4	62.20	10	104.11
10	Olga Mikutina	Austria	160.84	9	56.47	9	104.37
11	Julija Lovrenčič	Slovenia	148.92	13	50.71	11	98.21
12	Sofja Stepčenko	Latvia	145.27	11	53.29	13	91.98
13	Wi Seo-yeong	South Korea	145.27	14	46.99	12	98.14
14	Olivia Lisko	Finland	136.37	12	50.74	14	85.63
15	Elizabet Gervits	Israel	125.85	16	44.29	15	81.56
16	Josefin Brovall	Sweden	122.46	17	43.75	17	78.71
17	Miranda Lundgren	Sweden	121.24	21	39.68	16	81.56
18	Julia Brovall	Sweden	119.49	18	42.28	18	77.21
19	Sarah Marie Pesch	Germany	119.00	15	44.88	19	74.12
20	Mia Risa Gomez	Norway	114.90	20	41.47	20	73.43
21	Emilia Murdock	Spain	112.37	19	41.49	21	70.88
22	Katherine Ong Pui Kuan	Malaysia	103.24	22	33.30	22	69.94

=== Pairs ===
Pairs results
Rank	Skater	Nation	Total points	SP		FS	
1st place, gold medalist(s)	Minerva Fabienne Hase; Nikita Volodin	Germany	218.44	1	73.94	1	144.50
2nd place, silver medalist(s)	Deanna Stellato-Dudek; Maxime Deschamps	Canada	206.24	3	72.42	2	133.82
3rd place, bronze medalist(s)	Ellie Kam; Danny O'Shea	United States	184.38	2	73.16	7	111.22
4	Alisa Efimova; Misha Mitrofanov	United States	178.03	4	65.03	6	113.00
5	Lia Pereira; Trennt Michaud	Canada	176.28	7	57.04	3	119.24
6	Anastasia Vaipan-Law; Luke Digby	Great Britain	174.68	6	60.05	4	114.63
7	Ioulia Chtchetinina; Michał Woźniak	Poland	174.22	5	60.64	5	113.58
8	Letizia Roscher; Luis Schuster	Germany	151.29	8	52.34	8	98.95
9	Sophia Schaller; Livio Mayr	Austria	144.46	9	51.89	10	92.57
10	Ryom Tae-ok; Han Kum-chol	North Korea	140.64	11	45.74	9	94.90
11	Greta Crafoord; John Crafoord	Sweden	140.34	10	49.08	11	91.26
12	Julia Mauder; Johannes Wilkinson	South Africa	127.33	12	44.67	12	82.66

=== Ice dance ===
Ice dance results
Rank	Skater	Nation	Total points	RD		FD	
1st place, gold medalist(s)	Lilah Fear; Lewis Gibson	Great Britain	207.01	1	82.22	1	124.79
2nd place, silver medalist(s)	Christina Carreira; Anthony Ponomarenko	United States	197.51	2	77.66	2	119.85
3rd place, bronze medalist(s)	Emilea Zingas; Vadym Kolesnik	United States	194.34	3	77.47	3	116.87
4	Natálie Taschlerová; Filip Taschler	Czech Republic	182.15	4	75.10	4	107.05
5	Utana Yoshida; Masaya Morita	Japan	171.59	6	68.94	5	102.65
6	Olivia Smart; Tim Dieck	Spain	170.05	5	72.43	9	97.62
7	Mariia Nosovitskaya; Mikhail Nosovitskiy	Israel	161.23	9	61.87	8	99.36
8	Anna Simova; Kirill Aksenov	Slovakia	160.66	10	61.03	6	99.63
9	Mariia Pinchuk; Mykyta Pogorielov	Ukraine	159.53	8	63.04	10	96.49
10	Leia Dozzi; Pietro Papetti	Italy	156.38	11	60.07	11	96.31
11	Sofía Val; Asaf Kazimov	Spain	155.06	7	64.04	12	91.02
12	Angelina Kudryavtseva; Ilia Karankevich	Cyprus	153.42	12	53.98	7	99.44
13	Shira Ichilov; Dmitriy Kravchenko	Israel	134.87	13	53.46	13	81.41
14	Olexandra Borysova; Aaron Freeman	Poland	127.63	15	46.98	14	80.65
15	Romy Malcolm; Kobi Chant	Australia	121.09	14	47.81	16	73.28
16	Samantha Ritter; Daniel Brykalov	Azerbaijan	120.05	17	45.29	15	74.76
17	Athena Roberts; Eric Alis	Spain	117.89	16	46.32	17	71.57
