= Miriam Ziegler =

Austrian figure skater (born 1994)

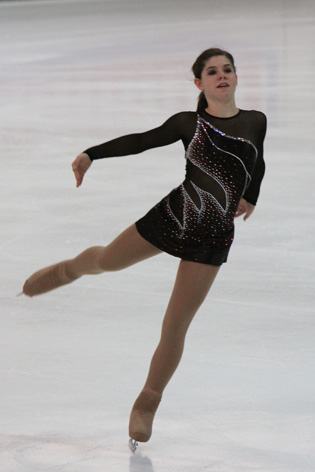
- Ziegler in 2009

Personal information
- Full name: Miriam Ziegler
- Born: 19 March 1994 (age 32) Oberpullendorf, Austria
- Height: 1.56 m (5 ft 1 in)

Figure skating career
- Country: Austria
- Partner: Severin Kiefer
- Coach: Knut Schubert, Bruno Massot
- Skating club: Grazer Eislaufverein
- Began skating: 1998
- Retired: March 24, 2022

Miriam Ziegler (born 19 March 1994) is a retired Austrian pair skater. With her skating partner, Severin Kiefer, she is a seven-time Austrian national champion (2014–16, 2018, 2020–22) and represented Austria at the 2014, 2018 and 2022 Winter Olympics. As a singles skater, she is a two-time Austrian national champion (2009, 2010) and competed at the 2010 Winter Olympics.

== Programs ==
=== With Kiefer ===
Season	Short program	Free skating	Exhibition
2021–2022	All I Want by Kodaline	Broken by Patrick Watson, Maxime Rodriguez; A Hint Of Joy by Maxime Rodriguez; Another Love by Tom Odell	
2020–2021	All I Want by Kodaline	Another Love by Tom Odell; Let the Wind Carry by Maxime Rodriguez	
2019–2020	Sunshine on Leith; In Your Hands by Charlie Winston	Broken by Patrick Watson, Maxime Rodriguez	
2018–2019	Fortitude By Haevn	Hello; Rolling in the Deep by Adele	
2017–2018	Sunshine on Leith	Coldplay Medley	One performed by Cinematic Pop
2016–2017	Turn to Stone by Ingrid Michaelson	Mika Medley	
2015–2016	It's Oh So Quiet performed by Björk choreo. by Mark Pillay	Moulin Rouge! by Craig Armstrong choreo. by Mark Pillay	Gold on the Ceiling by The Black Keys
2014–2015	C'est Pas D'l'amour performed by Rupa & the April Fishes; Zydeko (from Quidam) by Benoît Jutras	Phantasia; The Music of the Night (from The Phantom of the Opera) by Andrew Lloyd Webber	
2013–2014	Thank You; Unsquare Dance by Dave Brubeck	The Beatles Medley	

=== Single skating ===
Season	Short program	Free skating
2009–2010	Farewell by Apocalyptica	La Boulange; Mother's Journey (from Good Bye, Lenin!); Dishes (from Good Bye, Lenin!) by Yann Tiersen
2008–2009	Jeux d'Eau (from Cirque de Soleil); Infinity by Albena di Re	La Boulange; Mother's Journey (from Good Bye, Lenin!); Dishes (from Good Bye, Lenin!) by Yann Tiersen
2007–2008	Infinity by Albana di Re	Ladies in Lavender by Nigel Hess

== Results ==
GP: Grand Prix; CS: Challenger Series; JGP: Junior Grand Prix

=== Pair skating with Kiefer ===
International
Event	13–14	14–15	15–16	16–17	17–18	18–19	19–20	20–21	21–22
Olympics	17th				20th				19th
Worlds	22nd	18th	21st	18th	14th	10th	C	11th	7th
Europeans	12th	8th	9th	9th	7th	WD	6th		WD
GP Finland						4th			
GP France		8th	8th	6th			5th	C	
GP NHK Trophy				6th	6th				WD
GP Rostelecom					6th	4th	4th		8th
GP Skate America		8th							
GP Skate Canada			6th						
CS Cup of Tyrol								C	
CS Finlandia						4th	4th		
CS Ice Challenge		2nd							
CS Lombardia					6th				
CS Nebelhorn					4th		8th		
CS Nepela Trophy			5th						
CS Tallinn Trophy						1st			
Challenge Cup						2nd	1st	WD	
Cup of Nice		5th	2nd	2nd					
Cup of Tyrol				1st					
Ice Challenge	4th								
Ice Star						1st			
Merano Cup	4th								
Nebelhorn Trophy	12th								
Universiade	5th								
National
Austrian Champ.	1st	1st	1st		1st		1st	1st	1st

=== Single skating ===
International
Event	07–08	08–09	09–10	10–11	11–12	12–13	13–14
Olympics			26th				
Europeans			25th				
Cup of Nice	2nd J		13th				
Crystal Skate			4th				
Golden Spin		7th					
Ice Challenge			7th				7th
Nebelhorn Trophy			6th				
Nepela Memorial		8th					
Triglav Trophy			3rd				
International: Junior or novice
Junior Worlds	19th	14th					
JGP Austria	6th						
JGP Bulgaria	8th						
JGP France		11th					
JGP South Africa		7th					
JGP Turkey			19th				
EYOF		1st J					
Seibt Memorial	1st J						
Challenge Cup							
National
Austrian Champ.	4th	1st	1st		3rd		WD
Austrian Jr. Champ.	1st						
