= Severin Kiefer =

Austrian figure skater (born 1990)

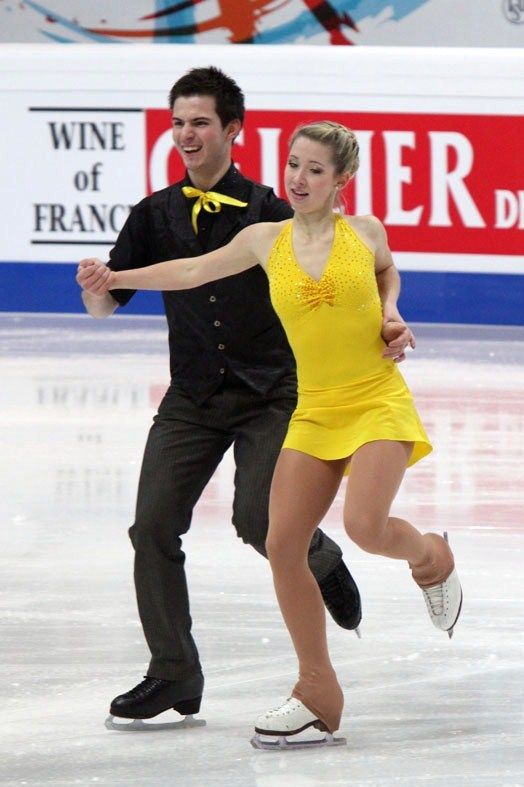
- Stina Martini and Severin Kiefer at the 2011 European Championships

Personal information
- Full name: Severin Kiefer
- Born: 11 October 1990 (age 35) Kuchl, Austria
- Height: 1.81 m (5 ft 11 in)

Figure skating career
- Country: Austria
- Discipline: Pair skating (2009–22); Men's singles (2005–14)
- Partner: Miriam Ziegler (2013–22); Stina Martini (2009–13)
- Began skating: 1994
- Retired: March 24, 2022

Medal record
Austrian Championships
| Bronze medal – third place | 2012 Graz | Singles |
| Bronze medal – third place | 2013 Vienna | Singles |
| Bronze medal – third place | 2014 Salzburg | Singles |

Severin Kiefer (born 11 October 1990) is a retired Austrian figure skater. He is a ten-time Austrian national pairs champion (2011–13 with Stina Martini; 2014–2016, 2018, and 2020–22 with Miriam Ziegler) and a three-time national bronze medalist (2012–14) in men's singles. He and Ziegler have represented Austria at the 2014, 2018 and 2022 Winter Olympics.

== Programs ==
=== With Ziegler ===
| Season | Short program | Free skating | Exhibition |
|---|---|---|---|
| 2020–2021 | All I Want by Kodaline | Another Love by Tom Odell; Let the Wind Carry by Maxime Rodriguez | |
| 2019–2020 | Sunshine on Leith; In Your Hands by Charlie Winston | Broken by Patrick Watson, Maxime Rodriguez | |
| 2018–2019 | Fortitude By Haevn | Hello; Rolling in the Deep by Adele | |
| 2017–2018 | Sunshine on Leith | Coldplay Medley | One performed by Cinematic Pop |
| 2016–2017 | Turn to Stone by Ingrid Michaelson | Mika Medley | |
| 2015–2016 | It's Oh So Quiet performed by Björk choreo. by Mark Pillay | Moulin Rouge! by Craig Armstrong choreo. by Mark Pillay | Gold on the Ceiling by The Black Keys |
| 2014–2015 | C'est Pas D'l'amour performed by Rupa & the April Fishes; Zydeko (from Quidam) by Benoît Jutras | Phantasia; The Music of the Night (from The Phantom of the Opera) by Andrew Lloyd Webber | |
| 2013–2014 | Thank You; Unsquare Dance by Dave Brubeck | The Beatles Medley | |

=== With Martini ===
| Season | Short program | Free skating |
|---|---|---|
| 2012–2013 | Chambermaid Swing by Parov Stelar | Sissi and Franz; Blue Danube; Radetzky March by Johann Strauss |
| 2011–2012 | Sissi and Franz; Blue Danube; Radetzky March by Johann Strauss | Poeta en el mar by Vincente Amigo |
| 2010–2011 | Once Upon a Time in the West by Ennio Morricone; Bonanza (soundtrack) | Addam's Family (soundtrack) |
| 2009–2010 | Great Balls of Fire; Stand By Me; Labamba | Addam's Family (soundtrack) |

=== Singles career ===
| Season | Short program | Free skating |
|---|---|---|
| 2010–2011 | Mack and Mable | Horror movies |
| 2008–2009 | Angie; "Paint It Black" by Rolling Stones | Beethoven's Last Night by Trans-Siberian Orchestra; Figaro's Wedding by W. A. Mozart (modern arrangement) |
| 2007–2008 | Mission: Impossible by Hans Zimmer and Lalo Schifrin | Beethoven's Last Night by Trans-Siberian Orchestra; Figaro's Wedding by W. A. Mozart (modern arrangement) |
| 2006–2007 | Toccata and Fugue by J. S. Bach | Art on Ice; Magic Stradivarius by Edvin Marton |

== Competitive highlights ==
GP: Grand Prix; CS: Challenger Series; JGP: Junior Grand Prix

=== With Ziegler ===
International
| Event | 13–14 | 14–15 | 15–16 | 16–17 | 17–18 | 18–19 | 19–20 | 20–21 | 21–22 |
|---|---|---|---|---|---|---|---|---|---|
| Olympics | 17th | | | | 20th | | | | 19th |
| Worlds | 22nd | 18th | 21st | 18th | 14th | 10th | C | 11th | 7th |
| Europeans | 12th | 8th | 9th | 9th | 7th | WD | 6th | | WD |
| GP Finland | | | | | | 4th | | | |
| GP France | | 8th | 8th | 6th | | | 5th | C | |
| GP NHK Trophy | | | | 6th | 6th | | | | WD |
| GP Rostelecom | | | | | 6th | 4th | 4th | | 8th |
| GP Skate America | | 8th | | | | | | | |
| GP Skate Canada | | | 6th | | | | | | |
| CS Cup of Tyrol | | | | | | | | C | |
| CS Finlandia | | | | | | 4th | 4th | | |
| CS Ice Challenge | | 2nd | | | | | | | |
| CS Lombardia | | | | | 6th | | | | |
| CS Nebelhorn | | | | | 4th | | 8th | | |
| CS Nepela Trophy | | | 5th | | | | | | |
| CS Tallinn Trophy | | | | | | 1st | | | |
| Challenge Cup | | | | | | 2nd | 1st | WD | |
| Cup of Nice | | 5th | 2nd | 2nd | | | | | |
| Cup of Tyrol | | | | 1st | | | | | |
| Ice Challenge | 4th | | | | | | | | |
| Ice Star | | | | | | 1st | | | |
| Merano Cup | 4th | | | | | | | | |
| Nebelhorn Trophy | 12th | | | | | | | | |
| Universiade | 5th | | | | | | | | |
National
| Austrian Champ. | 1st | 1st | 1st | | 1st | | 1st | 1st | 1st |

=== With Martini ===
International
| Event | 09–10 | 10–11 | 11–12 | 12–13 |
|---|---|---|---|---|
| World Champ. | | 21st | 22nd | |
| European Champ. | | 15th | 15th | 13th |
| Cup of Nice | | | | 6th |
| Golden Spin | | | 5th | 2nd |
| Ice Challenge | | 8th | | |
| Mont Blanc Trophy | | 5th | | |
| NRW Trophy | | 8th | | |
International: Junior
| World Junior Champ. | 20th | 16th | 15th | |
| JGP Austria | | | 16th | |
| JGP Germany | 21st | | | |
| Ice Challenge | | | 3rd J | |
National
| Austrian Champ. | 1st J | 1st | 1st | 1st |

=== Singles career ===
International
| Event | 05–06 | 06–07 | 07–08 | 08–09 | 09–10 | 10–11 | 11–12 | 12–13 | 13–14 |
|---|---|---|---|---|---|---|---|---|---|
| Ice Challenge | | | | | 26th | | 11th | | 9th |
| Merano Cup | | | | | 17th | 12th | | | |
| Mladost | | | | | | | | 2nd | |
| Mont Blanc | | | | | 8th | | | | |
| Nebelhorn | | | | | | 22nd | | | |
| Triglav | | | | | 11th | 11th | 6th | 7th | |
International: Junior
| Junior Worlds | | | 27th | | | | | | |
National
| Austrian | 3rd J | 1st J | 1st J | 2nd J | 4th | 4th | 3rd | 3rd | 3rd |
