= Deanna Stellato-Dudek =

American-Canadian pair skater (born 1983)

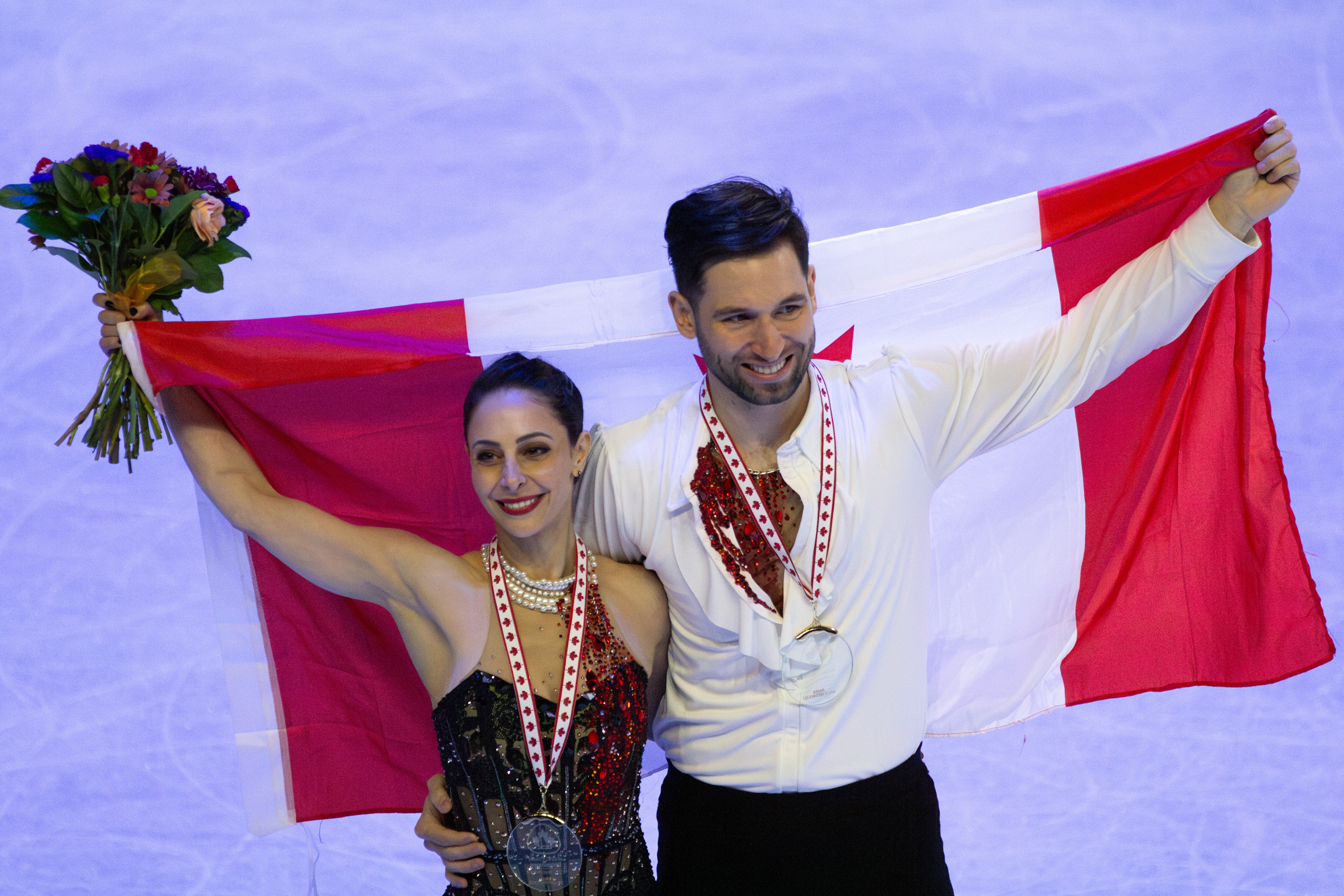
- Deanna Stellato-Dudek and Maxime Deschamps at the 2023 Skate Canada International

Personal information
- Born: June 22, 1983 (age 43) Park Ridge, Illinois, United States
- Home town: Chicago, Illinois, United States
- Height: 5 ft 1 in (1.55 m)

Figure skating career
- Country: United States (1999–2001; 2016–19; since 2026); Canada (2019–26)
- Discipline: Pair skating (since 2016); Women's singles (1999–2001)
- Partner: Danylo Siianytsia (since 2026); Maxime Deschamps (2019–26); Nathan Bartholomay (2016–19)
- Coach: Drew Meekins

Medal record
Event	Gold medal – first place	Silver medal – second place	Bronze medal – third place
World Championships	1	0	0
Four Continents Championships	1	1	1
Grand Prix Final	0	0	1
Canadian Championships	3	1	1
U.S. Championships	0	0	2
World Junior Championships	0	1	0
Junior Grand Prix Final	1	0	0
Medal list
representing Canada
World Championships
Gold medal – first place	2024 Montreal	Pairs
Four Continents Championships
Gold medal – first place	2024 Shanghai	Pairs
Silver medal – second place	2025 Seoul	Pairs
Bronze medal – third place	2023 Colorado Springs	Pairs
Grand Prix Final
Bronze medal – third place	2023–24 Beijing	Pairs
Canadian Championships
Gold medal – first place	2023 Oshawa	Pairs
Gold medal – first place	2024 Calgary	Pairs
Gold medal – first place	2025 Laval	Pairs
Silver medal – second place	2026 Gatineau	Pairs
Bronze medal – third place	2022 Ottawa	Pairs
Medal list
representing United States
U.S. Championships
Bronze medal – third place	2018 San Jose	Pairs
Bronze medal – third place	2019 Detroit	Pairs
World Junior Championships
Silver medal – second place	2000 Oberstdorf	Singles
Junior Grand Prix Final
Gold medal – first place	1999–2000 Gdańsk	Singles

Deanna Stellato-Dudek (born June 22, 1983) is an American-Canadian pair skater who currently competes with Danylo Siianytsia for the United States. With former skating partner Maxime Deschamps, she is the 2024 World champion, the 2024 Four Continents champion, the 2023–24 Grand Prix Final bronze medalist, an eight-time ISU Grand Prix medalist, a three-time ISU Challenger Series gold medalist, and a three-time Canadian national champion (2023–25). She is the oldest female figure skater to win a World title in any discipline.

She and Deschamps are also the first pair team to perform an assisted backflip in an ISU competition.

Competing for the United States with her former skating partner, Nathan Bartholomay, she is a three-time Challenger Series medalist and a two-time U.S. national bronze medalist (2018, 2019).

Stellato-Dudek originally competed in single skating, winning silver at the 2000 World Junior Championships and gold at the 1999–00 Junior Grand Prix Final. She won one senior international medal, a silver at the 2000 Karl Schäfer Memorial, prior to her initial retirement from competitive skating in 2001.

== Personal life ==
Stellato-Dudek was born 22 June 1983, in Park Ridge, Illinois. She is of Italian descent. She married a consultant, Michael Dudek, in 2013. In an interview with the New York Times in February of 2026, she indicated that she had "sacrificed a relationship" as a result of her pursuit of her pairs skating comeback, but declined to discuss this further.

She is a licensed aesthetician and permanent cosmetic professional. She has worked as the director of aesthetics at the Geldner Center in Chicago.

Stellato-Dudek was granted Canadian citizenship on 11 December 2024.

== Single skating ==
Stellato-Dudek began learning to skate as a five-year-old. In the 1999–2000 season, she won the ISU Junior Grand Prix Final and went on to win the silver medal at the 2000 World Junior Championships. A member of Wagon Wheel FSC, she was coached by Cindy Watson-Caprel and Philip Mills in Northbrook and Buffalo Grove, Illinois.

Stellato-Dudek began the following season at a U.S.-only team event, the 2000 Keri Lotion Classic, where she was partnered with Michael Weiss. She received a 6.0 for presentation. Making her senior international debut, she won silver at the 2000 Karl Schäfer Memorial in October. In November, she finished fifth at a Grand Prix event, the 2000 Skate Canada International, where she injured her right hip before the free skate. After returning to training two weeks later, Stellato-Dudek sustained a pulled hip flexor in the same hip, which led to her withdrawal from the 2001 U.S. Championships. She later decided to retire from competition. Due to four different hip injuries, she had skated for approximately 24 months in four years. Other injuries in her career included a torn ligament in her right ankle and a fractured left ankle.

== Pair skating ==
=== Partnership with Bartholomay ===
Following her retirement from competitive skating, Stellato-Dudek studied and began a career as an aesthetician. While attending a work retreat, a team-building exercise prompt, "what is something you'd do if you knew you couldn't fail?" inspired her to revive her interest in skating. She resumed skating in March 2016, in the Chicago area, before visiting her former coach, Cindy Watson-Caprel, who had moved to a rink in Ellenton, Florida. In Florida, U.S. Figure Skating's high-performance director, Mitch Moyer, suggested a tryout with Nathan Bartholomay, a pair skater who was working at the same rink. In July 2016, Stellato-Dudek and Bartholomay announced that they had formed a partnership and were based at the Ellenton Ice and Sports Complex. Coached by Jim Peterson, they trained on ice three hours a day, five days a week.

==== 2016–17 season: Debut of Stellato-Dudek/Bathrolomay ====
Making their international debut together, the Stellato-Dudek/Bartholomay placed sixth at the 2016 CS Golden Spin of Zagreb. After taking the gold medal at the Eastern Sectional Championships, they qualified for the 2017 U.S. Championships where they finished in fourth place, earning the pewter medal.

==== 2017–18 season ====
Stellato-Dudek/Bartholomay began the season with two Challenger assignments, finishing sixth at both the 2017 CS U.S. Classic and the 2017 CS Finlandia Trophy. They were then invited to make their Grand Prix debut as a team, finishing eighth of eight teams at the 2017 Skate America.

Stellato-Dudek and Bartholomay won the bronze medal at the 2018 U.S. Championships. This earned them an assignment to the 2018 Four Continents Championships, where they finished fifth. Upon the withdrawal of national silver medalists Kayne/O'Shea from the 2018 World Championships, Stellato-Dudek/Bartholomay were called up to replace them on the team. They finished seventeenth in the short program, missing the cut from the free skate segment. Stellato-Dudek said that she hoped to compete until at least the 2022 Winter Olympics in Beijing, remarking, "I've had a 16-year vacation; I can go another four."

==== 2018–19 season ====
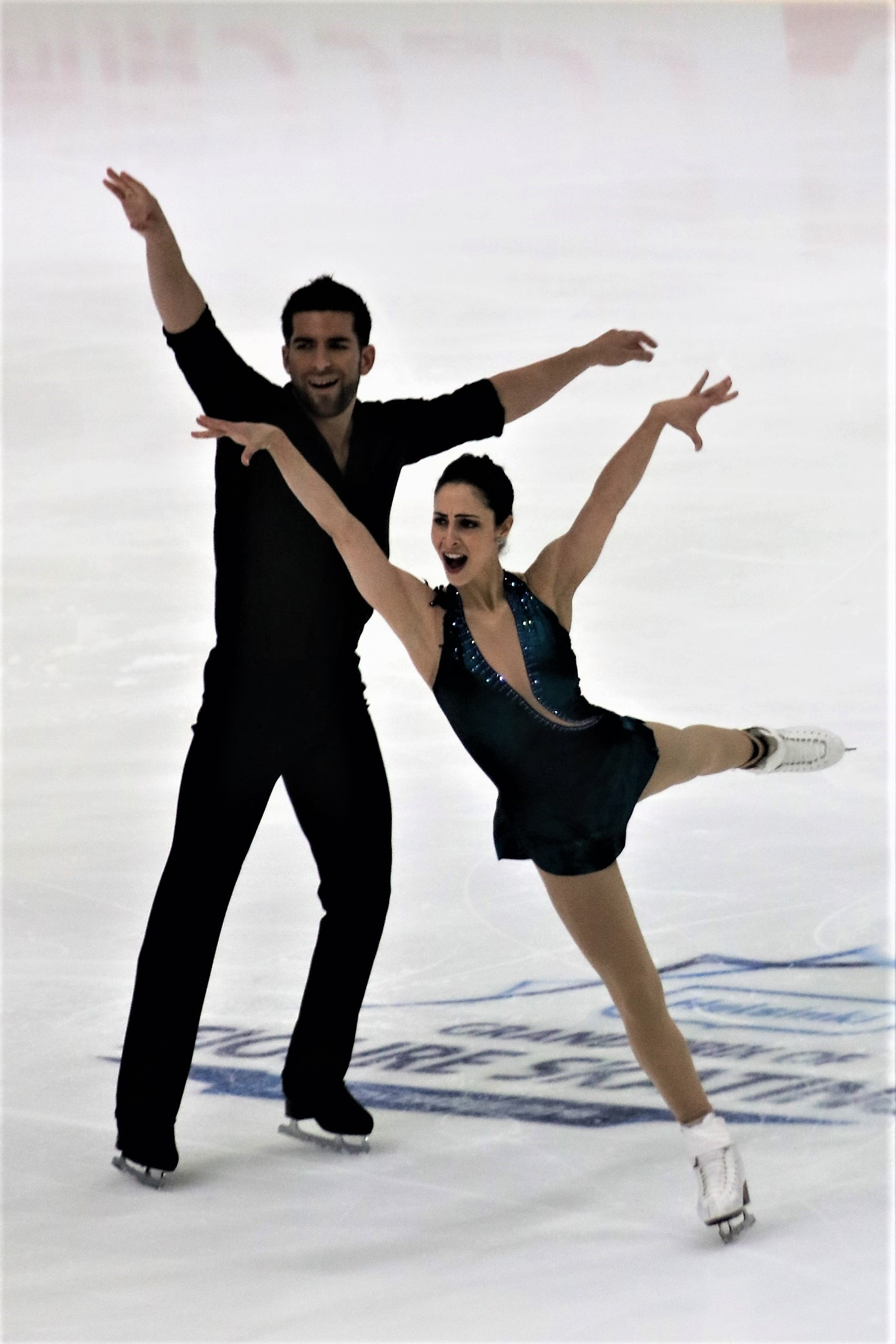
Dudek and Bartholomay at the 2018 Grand Prix of Helsinki

Stellato-Dudek/Bartholomay opened the 2018–19 figure skating season with two Challenger events, winning silver at the Nepela Trophy and bronze at Nebelhorn Trophy. They placed sixth at the 2018 Grand Prix of Helsinki and had to withdraw from the 2018 Rostelecom Cup. Competing in a third Challenger event, they won another bronze medal at the 2018 CS Golden Spin of Zagreb.

Stellato-Dudek/Bartholomay won a second consecutive bronze medal at the 2019 U.S. Championships. However, due to perceived inconsistent results earlier in the season, they were not assigned to the third American berth at the 2019 Four Continents Championships, that going instead to pewter medalists Kayne/O'Shea. Coach Jim Peterson said afterward "we are disappointed, what can I say? We are the U.S. bronze medalists. We defeated Kayne and O'Shea at nationals."

The national championships would be the team's final competition, as they announced in April 2019 that injuries to Bartholomay precluded them from continuing together.

=== Partnership with Deschamps ===
Following the end of her partnership with Bartholomay, Stellato-Dudek returned to Chicago and continued training by herself while seeking a new partner, later saying, "I called every single coach I’d ever met in my entire life to see if they had anyone available." Upon learning of Canadian pair skater Maxime Deschamps, she arranged a tryout in Montreal overseen by coach Bruno Marcotte, and they shortly after formed a new partnership.

The pair considered skating for either the U.S. or Canada. They chose to skate for Canada as Deschamps would probably not be able to get U.S. citizenship in time for the 2026 Olympics, but Stellato-Dudek would probably be able to get Canadian citizenship by then.

Given the difficulty of obtaining Canadian citizenship before 2022, Stellato-Dudek said that her goal was to compete at the 2026 Winter Olympics, joking, "I'm already too old to be doing this, so I can be too old in six years, too. So what's the difference?" The new partnership first came to public notice when they appeared on the entry list for the Souvenir Georges-Éthier domestic competition. Following Marcotte's relocation to Ontario, they were coached by Ian Connolly and later Josée Picard.

==== 2019–20 season ====
Stellato-Dudek was not initially released to compete internationally by the American federation, so the team appeared only domestically in the 2019–20 season. Stellato-Dudek/Deschamps won the Quebec sectional qualifying event before taking bronze at Skate Canada Challenge to qualify for the 2020 Canadian Championships. However, Stellato-Dudek sustained a hamstring injury in the leadup to the event, hampering their progress. They placed sixth in their national championship debut.

==== 2020–21 season ====
With the onset of the COVID-19 pandemic, the international and domestic seasons were largely curtailed. Stellato-Dudek/Deschamps repeated their previous season's sectionals and Challenge results, but the 2021 Canadian Championships were cancelled.

==== 2021–22 season ====
After securing her release from the USFS, Stellato-Dudek/Deschamps debuted internationally at the 2021 CS Autumn Classic International, placing fourth, ahead of Bartholomay and his new partner Katie McBeath. They were given a second Challenger event, the 2021 CS Warsaw Cup, where they finished in sixth place.

Deschamps contracted COVID-19 in the leadup to the 2022 Canadian Championships, and as a result they were only able to resume training a week beforehand. They won the bronze medal, their first national podium, with Stellato-Dudek saying, "we feel really happy. We fought for every element in that program, so we are happy to be here." Stellato-Dudek/Deschamps went on to finish fourth at the 2022 Four Continents Championships.

==== 2022–23 season: First national title and Four Continents bronze ====
The beginning of the new Olympic cycle saw a significant shift in the international pairs scene as a result of retirements and the banning of all Russian competitors due to the Russo-Ukrainian War. Stellato-Dudek/Deschamps won the gold medal at the 2022 CS Nebelhorn Trophy. This was Stellato-Dudek's first international title in 22 years. They also shared with the rest of the Canadian delegation the Fritz Geiger Memorial Trophy for the highest-ranked country at the event.

The team was then invited to make their Grand Prix debut at the 2022 Skate America and won the silver medal, only 3.5 points behind gold medalists Knierim/Frazier. This was the first Grand Prix medal for both skaters. Stellato-Dudek also became the oldest Grand Prix medalist in history. They travelled to Angers for the 2022 Grand Prix de France, their second Grand Prix event, and won the gold medal. This was the first Grand Prix win for both skaters and made her, at age 39, the oldest skater to win a Grand Prix event. Their results qualified them for the Grand Prix Final. Stellato-Dudek/Deschamps entered the event considered likely bronze medalists and placed third in the short program, distantly behind top-ranked teams Knierim/Frazier and Japan's Miura/Kihara and 2.04 points of Italians Conti/Macii. Stellato-Dudek said she was pleased by the result, revealing that she had "got really ill" in recent weeks and "had to take time off the ice and off the training, and I lost weight, and I lost muscles, so we were training very hard to try and be ready for here." However, the team struggled in the free skate, placing fifth in that segment and dropping behind the Italians for fourth overall. She called this a disappointment but said it was understandable in light of their training difficulties.

Stellato-Dudek continued to experience health difficulties in the aftermath of the Final, presumed to be a result of respiratory syncytial virus infection, which made her unable to breathe through her mouth. She had limited medical options for dealing with the virus given the need to remain compliant with WADA guidelines. Despite these difficulties, the pair resolved to compete at the 2023 Canadian Championships, with Stellato-Dudek explaining that "I want it so badly because I want it for Max so much, because this is his tenth Canadian championship and last year I was so proud, I was the first partner you got a medal with in senior. So, to be the partner that brings him the gold would be really special to me." They won the gold medal by a margin of 11.92 points over silver medalists McIntosh/Mimar.

Following the national championships, Stellato-Dudek eventually recovered from the extended illness, and was assessed as being at "100% of her physical power" for a week in advance of the 2023 Four Continents Championships. They finished second in the short program despite her stepping out of their throw jump. The free skate proved somewhat more difficult, with Deschamps falling on an attempt at the triple Salchow jump. They were third in that segment, albeit with a new personal best score, and won the bronze medal. This was Stellato-Dudek's first ISU championship medal in 23 years, to which she said "it means a lot to me to bring home hardware and I have all intention to continue until 2026."

Stellato-Dudek/Deschamps placed fourth in the short program at the 2023 World Championships in Saitama, only 0.43 points behind Conti/Macii in third. Both erred on their triple Salchow attempt in the free skate, and they finished sixth in that segment, but remained in fourth overall. Stellato-Dudek/Deschamps then joined Team Canada for the 2023 World Team Trophy, where they came third in the short program, narrowly beating Conti/Macii. They were fourth in the free skate, while Team Canada finished sixth overall.

==== 2023–24 season: World and Four Continents champions, Grand Prix Final bronze ====
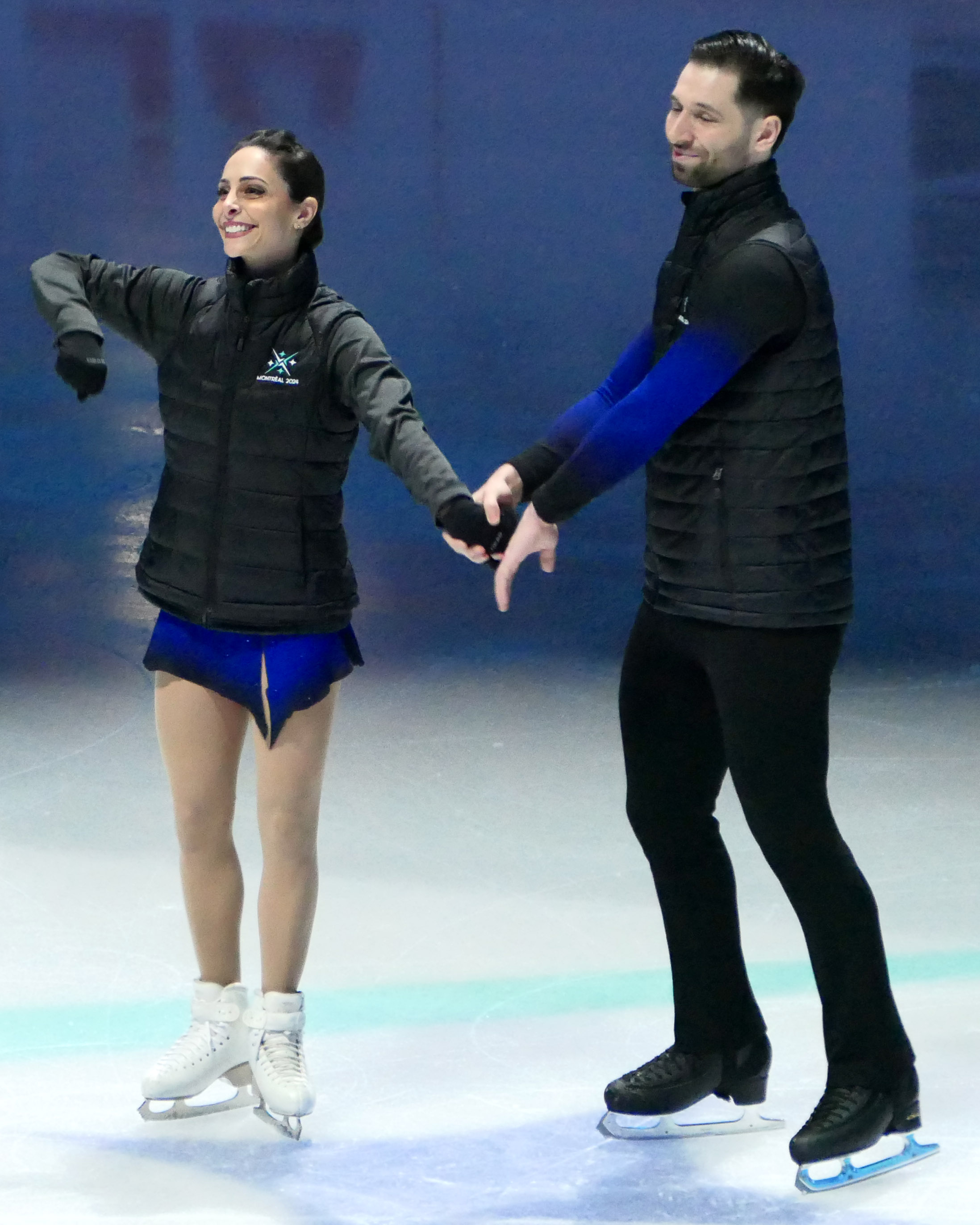
Stellato-Dudek and Deschamps before the short program at the 2024 World Championships

In anticipation of Deschamps' home province hosting the 2024 World Championships in Montreal, the duo selected Cirque du Soleil's "Oxygène" as a homage to French Canadian culture. Their Interview with the Vampire free program featured Stellato-Dudek acting the part of a vampire.

Beginning the season at the 2023 CS Autumn Classic International, Stellato-Dudek/Deschamps won gold. They set new personal bests in the free skate and total score, passing 200 points in the latter for the first time. On the Grand Prix, they competed first at the 2023 Skate Canada International, placing first in both segments to win the gold medal. They broke the 140-point threshold in the free skate for the first time, and set a new personal best in total score as well. Stellato-Dudek commented afterward: "I am very happy, which is a rarity. We have been waiting for a performance like this for years!" At the 2023 Cup of China, they won the segment and earned a 4.06-point lead over Italians Ghilardi/Ambrosini, despite Stellato-Dudek putting a hand down on their throw. “We are happy our three-week marathon of competitions and travel is over,” Stellato-Dudek said. “We will check the protocols to see where we can improve. This week was a test to our mental and physical strength.” They said the event was a test for them given the travel to China. The free skate proved more difficult, including an aborted final lift, but they still won that segment as well and took another Grand Prix gold. She said afterward that they were "exhausted at the start of the program and it was fight from beginning to the end, but we are happy with the outcome."

Stellato-Dudek/Deschamps entered the 2023–24 Grand Prix Final as one of the perceived gold medal contenders. After minor mistakes on their jumps and throw, they finished narrowly second in the short program, 1.34 points back of new German team Hase/Volodin and 0.92 ahead of Italians Conti/Macii in third. They had problems with both jumps and throws in the free skate as well, dropping to third place overall, albeit 2.13 points back of first. Both said that they had higher expectations, but Stellato-Dudek added that "we showed that even with big mistakes on the elements, we can score pretty high."

At the 2024 Canadian Championships, the duo finished first in the short program, but only by 0.82 points over Pereira/Michaud after errors on both their throw and side-by-side jumps. Despite jump errors in the free skate Stellato-Dudek/Deschamps won that segment by a wide margin and took their second consecutive national title. They both said that they had done considerable work on throw improvements in the leadup.

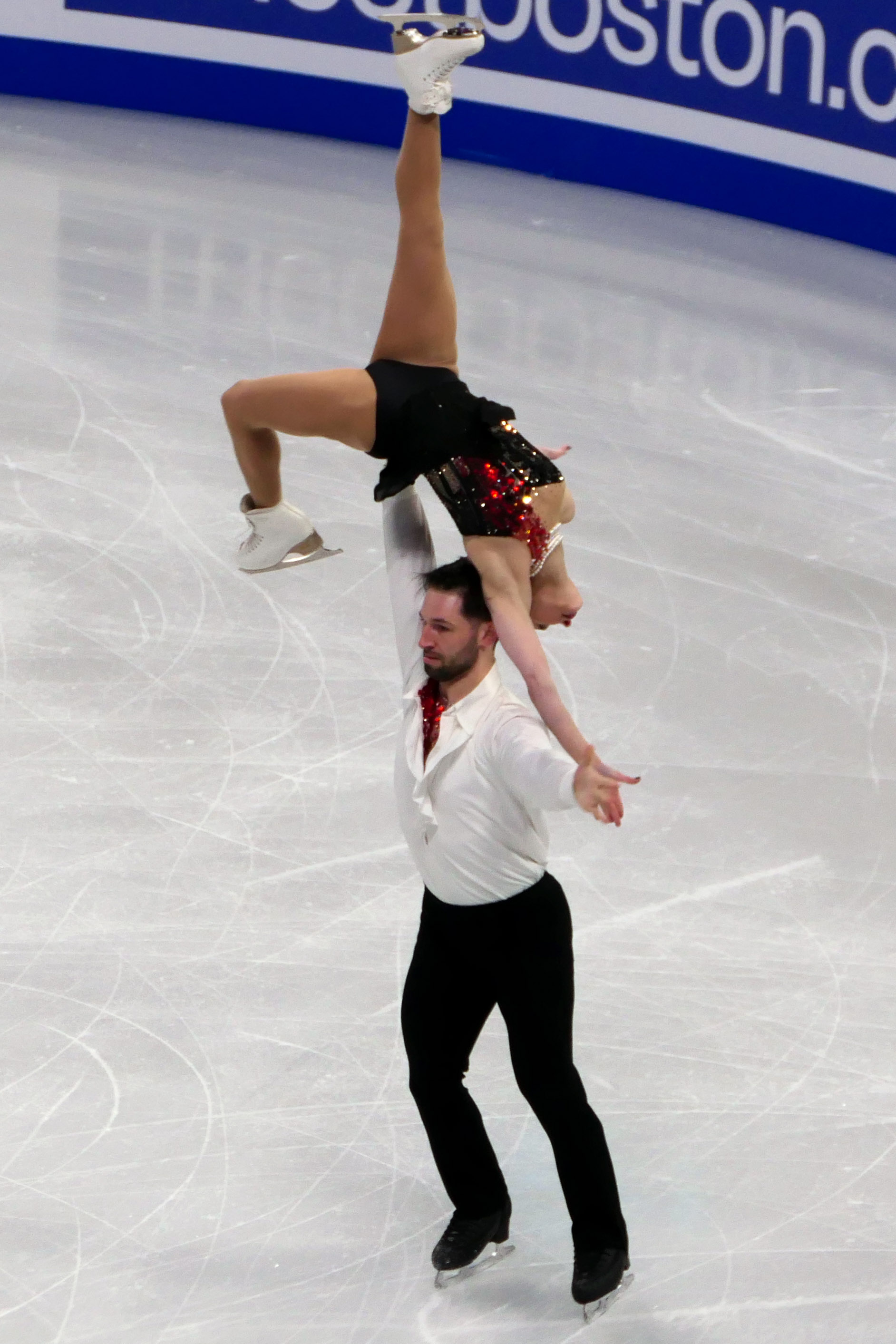
Stellato-Dudek and Deschamps perform a lift at the end of their free skate at the 2024 World Championships.

Returning to China for the third time that season for the 2024 Four Continents Championships in Shanghai, where Stellato-Dudek/Deschamps faced reigning Japanese world champions Miura/Kihara, who were returning to competition after an absence due to injury. The Canadians won the short program despite Deschamps falling on his triple toe loop attempt. They won the free skate as well, despite Stellato-Dudek hurting her arm on the landing of their opening triple twist and a later jump error by Deschamps, and took their first Four Continents title. Saying they were very happy with the result, Stellato-Dudek added there was "definitely still a lot of growth in the performance, we know we can do a lot better than that, and we're looking forward to doing that at Worlds." With this accomplishment Stellato-Dudek became the oldest female ISU championship gold medalist in history. Later in the month at the 2024 ISU Skating Awards, she received a Special Achievement Award in recognition of "her exceptional determination, trailblazing impact, and role as an inspiration to all."

At the World Championships, Stellato-Dudek/Deschamps won the short program with a new personal best score of 77.48, an advantage of 3.95 points over Miura/Kihara in second place. In the free skate, Stellato-Dudek stepped out of the end of her jump combination attempt, but the program was otherwise clean. The team came second in that segment, 0.27 points behind Miura/Kihara, but remained in first place overall and took the gold medal.

This was the first World title for a Canadian pair since Duhamel/Radford in 2016, and the first for Canada in any discipline since Kaetlyn Osmond in 2018. Stellato-Dudek, at 40, became the oldest woman to win a figure skating World title in any discipline, breaking a record set by 38-year-old German-Finnish pair skater Ludowika Jakobsson 101 years prior. Her feat attracted notable media coverage, and praise from competitors, with bronze medalist Hase remarking "it's amazing. We were all bowing in front of you. You have my highest respect." Stellato-Dudek said the gold medal was "a dream come true," adding that she hoped it would encourage athletes to stay in the sport longer.

==== 2024–25 season: Four Continents silver ====
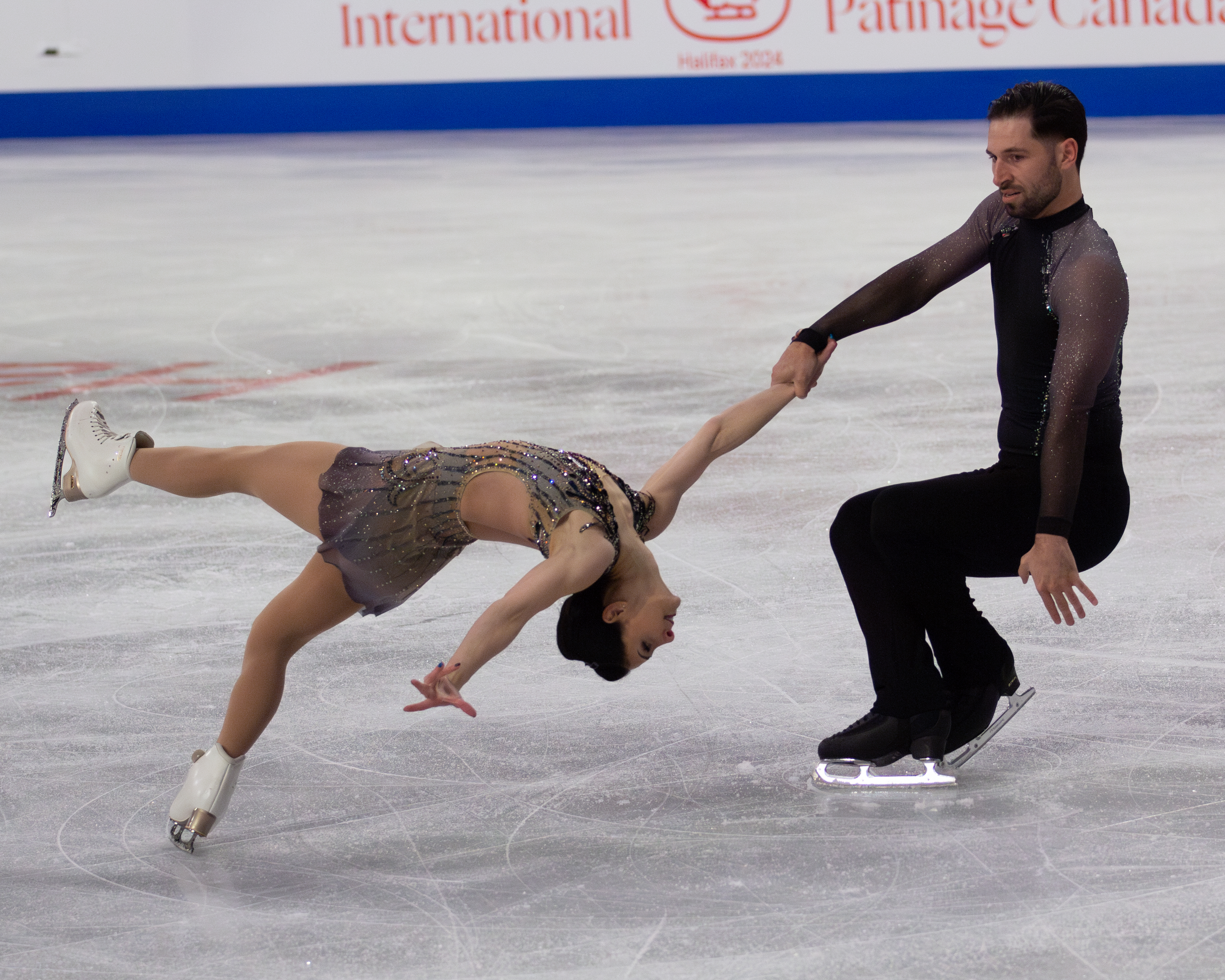
Stellato-Dudek and Deschamps perform a death spiral during their short program at 2024 Skate Canada International.

Stellato-Dudek/Deschamps began the season by winning silver at the 2024 CS Nebelhorn Trophy behind Hase/Volodin. Going on to compete on the 2024–25 Grand Prix series, the pair won the short program at 2024 Skate Canada International with an almost nine-point lead over the teams in second and third place. However, they made several mistakes in the free skate and placed second in that segment of the competition, although their lead after the short program was enough to hang onto first place. Following the event, Deschamps said, "That was certainly not easy tonight. It was going well at home, but it's gonna happen sometimes."

Three weeks later, the pair would deliver stronger performances at the 2024 Finlandia Trophy, where they won a second Grand Prix gold medal. Stellato-Dudek had a fluke fall in the free skate, but said she felt it went better than at Skate Canada. They subsequently qualified for the 2024–25 Grand Prix Final. In the leadup to the Final, however, Deschamps fell ill, beginning with a fever that lasted four days. They ultimately had to withdraw from the Final.

On December 11, less than a week after their withdrawal from the Grand Prix Final, Stellato-Dudek took the Canadian oath of citizenship, resolving the team's longstanding questions around eligibility to compete at the 2026 Winter Olympics. She described having "felt internally such a huge, ignited fire. Such a belief in the possibility that this crazy, wild dream I have, it can actually happen now." The team next competed at the 2025 Canadian Championships, seeking a third consecutive national title. Stellato-Dudek/Deschamps won the short program with only a step-out on their throw jump. The free skate was more difficult, with a number of errors on jumps and throws, as well as a time violation deduction, and they came second in that segment behind Pereira/Michaud. Remaining first overall, they took the gold medal. Both expressed frustration with the performance, with Stellato-Dudek adding "I don't really know what’s happening this year. I don't know how many more clean run-throughs I have to do at home to do it in competition."

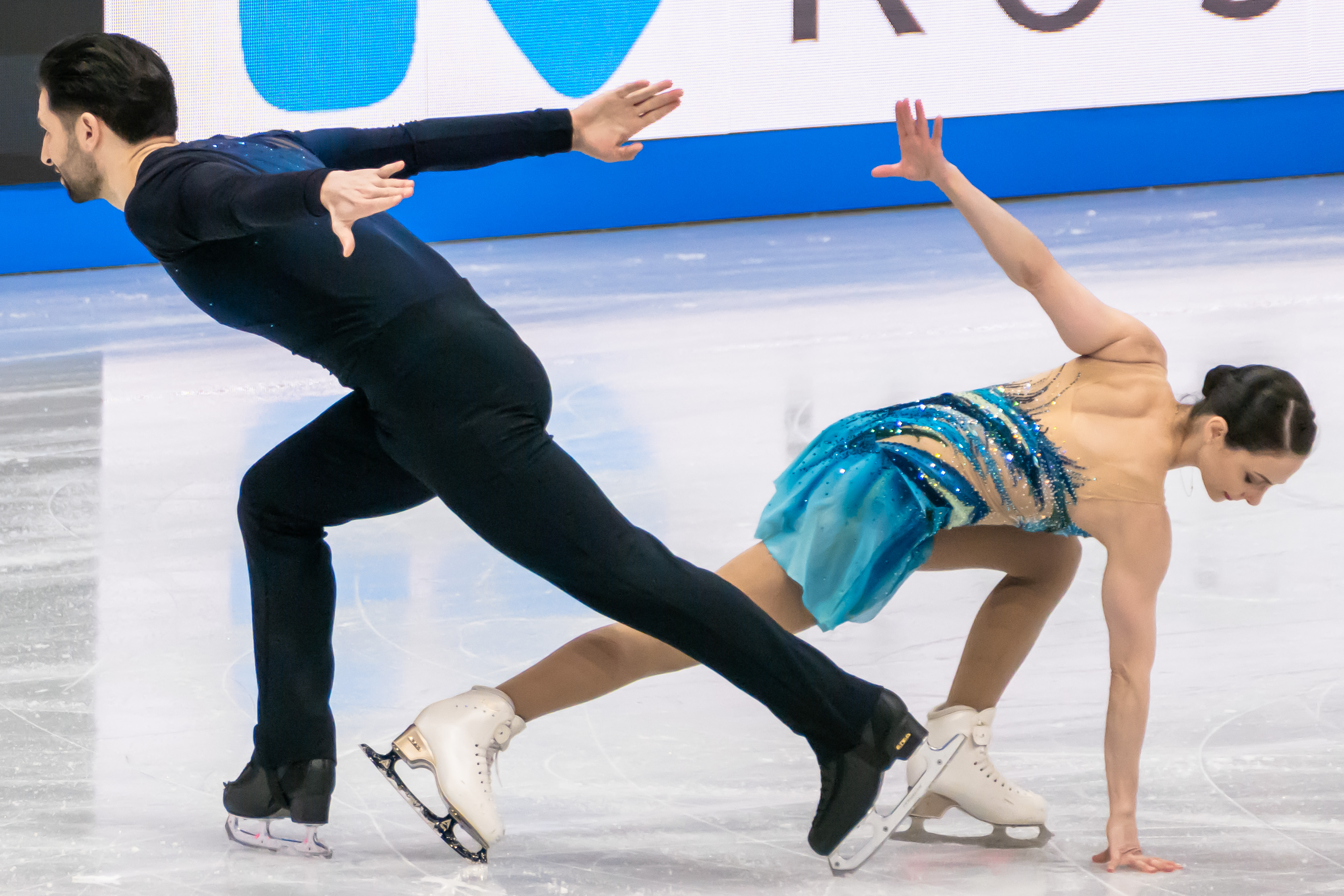
Stellato-Dudek and Deschamps in their starting position at the 2025 World Championships

In the short program at the 2025 Four Continents Championships, Stellato-Dudek/Deschamps struggled somewhat, with Deschamps' triple toe landing imperfect and Stellato-Dudek putting a hand down on their throw triple loop. They came fourth in the segment, 0.13 points behind Pereira/Michaud in third. Speaking afterward, she again expressed frustration, noting as well that she had hurt her hip on a choreographic practice beforehand. The team then had a strong free skate, the only error being another touchdown by her on the throw triple loop element, coming second in the segment with a season's best score of 141.26 and rising to second place overall. Stellato-Dudek remarked afterward that "the long has been not going well at all this year. Now at least we know it's possible and we can taken that with us to Boston."

Going on to compete at the 2025 World Championships, Stellato-Dudek/Deschamps placed seventh in the short program and fifth in the free skate, finishing in fifth place overall. Reflecting on the event, Stellato-Dudek shared in an interview following the free skate, "Yesterday [the short program] was really kind of disappointing, today felt much better. It was a good bounce back. I’m a little bit disappointed about the toeloop. I haven’t missed one in two years, so that’s kind of upsetting. We were told that this season, going into everything as defending champions, would be difficult, but now we actually know what it means. A person who’s been in figure skating for more than 50 years told us that it’s probably a good thing to give that burden of being the defending world champion going into the Olympic season to someone else. Now I’m really hungry for next season. I feel like I am better at attacking."

Selected to compete for Team Canada at the 2025 World Team Trophy, Stellato-Dudek/Deschamps placed fourth in all segments of the pairs event and Team Canada finished fifth overall. "This competition was tough," said Stellato-Dudek. "You're tired coming in and then the big jet lag for us from North America, and I was like, 'oh this long program is going to be tough!' It was harder than I thought it was going to be. I changed the position of my forward outside death spiral. It wasn't for the level, it was for GOE."

==== 2025–26 season: Milano Cortina Olympics ====
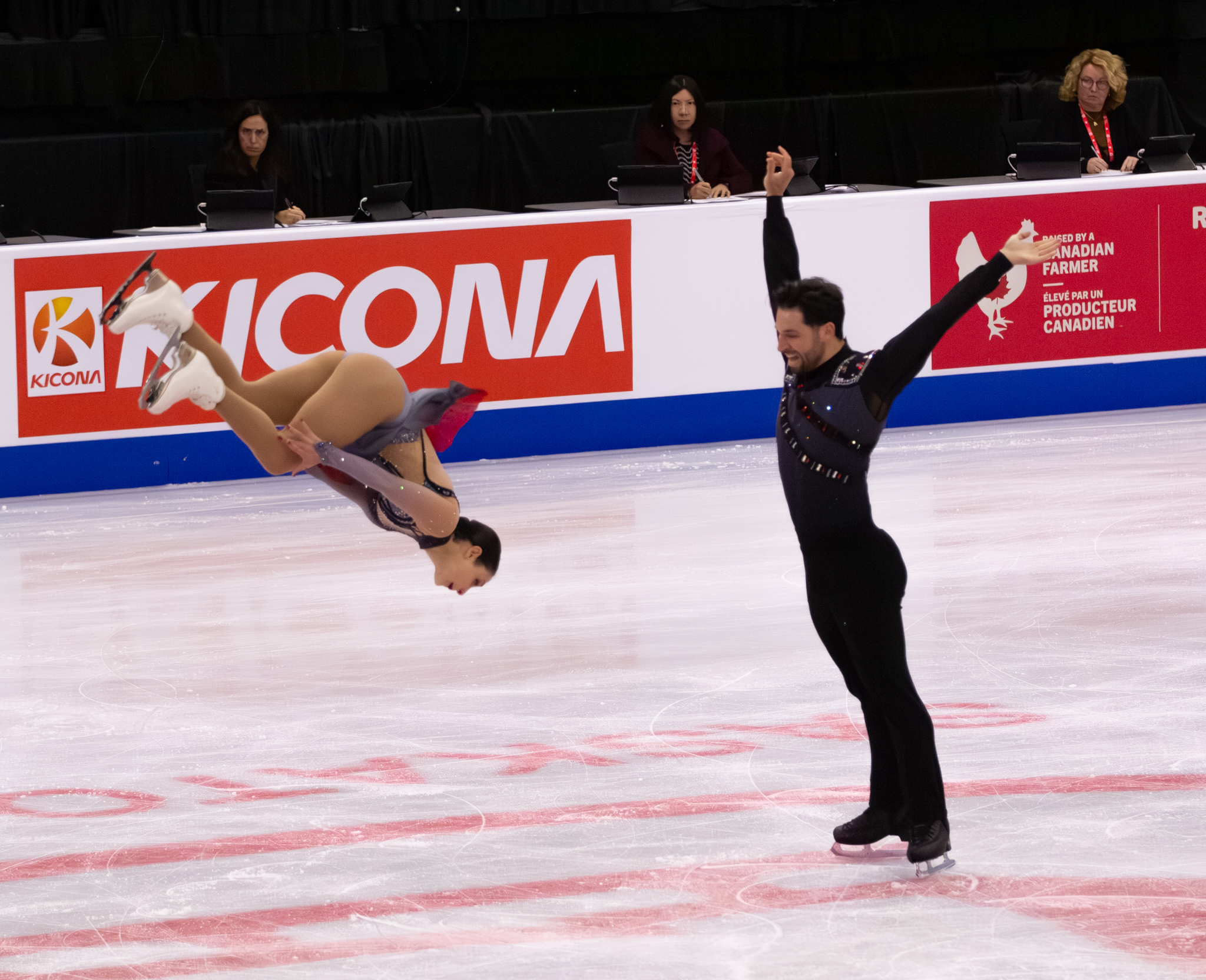
Stellato-Dudek and Deschamps performing their assisted backflip at the 2025 Skate Canada International

Stellato-Dudek/Deschamps started their season in early September by winning gold at the 2025 CS John Nicks International Pairs Competition. During the event, Stellato-Dudek/Deschamps became the first pair team to perform an assisted backflip in an ISU competition.

They then went on to win the silver medal at the 2025 Grand Prix de France. "For me, winning the medal means that we fought through, and despite the mistakes, we didn't give up," said Stellato-Dudek after the free skate.

Two weeks later, Stellato-Dudek and Deschamps competed at 2025 Skate Canada International where they won their third consecutive Skate Canada International title. The team placed second in the short program after some mistakes. “For us, it was more attack than what we did in France,” said Deschamps when comparing the performances. “We got some little silly mistakes on some stuff, but it’s okay. We’ll get back and work on them to make sure that doesn’t happen.” Stellato-Dudek and Deschamps went on to place first in the free skate with a new season's best, moving up first place overall. “We’ve won Skate Canada before, but this one, it holds so much weight being in the big year,” said Stellato-Dudek. “We’re just really proud that we can have this victory in front of a home crowd.”

The following month, the duo finished sixth at the 2025–26 Grand Prix Final. "I don't really know what to say when it's like so far from how we practice," said Stellato-Dudek after the free skate. "We felt ready and everything," added Deschamps. "We had some good performances, but we need to do it more often, it's not enough right now. We will take a week off to recover."

In January, Stellato-Dudek/Deschamps competed at the 2026 Canadian Championships as the heavy favourites. Shortly before the event, Stellato-Dudek fell ill with a stomach bug. Despite this, Stellato-Dudek/Deschamps won the short program by a nine-point margin over Pereira/Michaud. Their free program, however, was riddled with errors, allowing Pereira/Michaud to capture the gold medal ahead of them. Stellato-Dudek/Deschamps were subsequently named to the 2026 Winter Olympic team.

On 2 February, days before the start of the 2026 Winter Olympics Figure Skating Team Event, the Canadian Olympic Committee announced that Stellato-Dudek/Deschamps would be unable to participate due to Stellato-Dudek sustaining an injury during training. They further stated that Stellato-Dudek's condition would be closely monitored to determine whether she and Deschamps will be able to partake in the Individual Pairs Event set to take place the following week. On 10 February, it was announced that Stellato-Dudek had been cleared to compete in the individual pair skating event despite having hit her head during a training accident.

The team went on to compete in the Pairs' individual event at the 2026 Winter Olympics where they placed 11th overall. "We lost two weeks of training leading up to this," said Stellato-Dudek after the free skate. "We had to make some strategic decisions going into the free program. But the way that we held that together after not doing a run-through for two weeks is pretty amazing. I joke with Maxim that he literally and figuratively always carries me through when I’m having a hard time, and he did not disappoint tonight."

=== Partnership with Siianytsia ===
==== 2026–27 season ====
On August 27, the US Skating Federation published the news that Stellato-Dudek had returned to representing the US and had teamed up with Danil Siianytsia. This followed an instagram post she had released the weekend before in which she thanked Skate Canada, her coaches, the Canadian fans, and her former partner Maxime, who had previously announced his retirement. Stellato-Dudek and Siianytsia train in Colorado Springs with Drew Meekins and hope to qualify for Nationals. That same evening, Stellato-Dudek and Siianytsia skated in front of a bigger audience for the first time at the Boston Summer Sizzler event.

== Programs ==
=== Pair skating with Maxime Deschamps (for Canada) ===
Season	Short program	Free skating	Exhibition
2025–2026	Carmina Burana; In trutina; O Fortuna by Carl Orff choreo. by Lori Nichol	Poeta en el Mar; Amor Dulce Muerte by Vicente Amigo choreo. by Lori Nichol	Limbo Rock; Let's Twist Again by Chubby Checker
2024–2025	Crazy in Love (Fifty Shades of Grey Remix) by Beyoncé choreo. by Julie Marcotte	Siren's Song by Andrea Krux; Mobula Rays (from Blue Planet II) by Hans Zimmer, David Fleming, & Jacob Shea; Lux by Ryan Taubert; The Blue Planet (from Blue Planet II) by Hans Zimmer, David Fleming, & Jacob Shea choreo. by Julie Marcotte	Limbo Rock; Let's Twist Again by Chubby Checker; All I Ask by Adele
2023–2024	Oxygène by Cirque du Soleil, Germain Gauthier, Jean-Philippe Goncalves, & Béatrice Bonifassi choreo. by Julie Marcotte	Interview with the Vampire by Daniel Hart choreo. by Julie Marcotte	All I Ask by Adele
2022–2023	Oblivion by Astor Piazzolla performed by +Tango choreo. by Julie Marcotte	Cleopatra by Trevor Jones choreo. by Julie Marcotte	Keeping Me Alive (Acoustic) by Jonathan Roy
2021–2022	No Ordinary Love by You+Me choreo. by Julie Marcotte	(I Just) Died in Your Arms by Cutting Crew performed by Hidden Citizens choreo. by Julie Marcotte	
2019–2020	New York State of Mind by Billy Joel performed by Barbra Streisand choreo. by Julie Marcotte	Divenire by Ludovico Einaudi performed by Angèle Dubeau & La Pietà choreo. by Julie Marcotte	

=== Pair skating with Nathan Bartholomay (for the United States) ===
Season	Short program	Free skating
2018–2019	Somewhere by Barbra Streisand; La cumparsita by Forever Tango	Run To You; I Have Nothing by Whitney Houston
2017–2018	Hallelujah by The Tenors; Eleanor Rigby by John Lennon and Paul McCartney	Where the Streets Have No Name; One by U2
2016–2017	The Tenors medley	The Firebird by Igor Stravinsky

=== Single skating (for the United States) ===
Season	Short program	Free skating	Exhibition
2000–2001	Moonflower by David Arkenstone	Cello's Song by David Arkenstone and Kostia; Prelude to the Dance; The Setting of Two Suns; Firedance by David Lanz	
1999–2000	Storm Cry by David Arkenstone	The Inn on Mount Ada by John Tesh; Concerto for piano played by Peter Toperczer; Ave Maria by G. Verdi; Dark Horse by David Lanz; Dark House by David Lanz and Don Davis	Man, I Feel Like a Woman by Shania Twain

== Competitive highlights ==
- GP – Event of the ISU Grand Prix Series
- JGP – Event of the ISU Junior Grand Prix Series
- CS – Event of the ISU Challenger Series
- C – Competition was cancelled
- TBD – Assigned
- WD – Withdrew from competition
- Medals at team events are awarded for the team results only. Individual placements at team events are listed in parentheses.

=== Pair skating with Maxime Deschamps (for Canada) ===
Competition placements at senior level
Season	2019–20	2020–21	2021–22	2022–23	2023–24	2024–25	2025–26
Winter Olympics							11th
World Championships				4th	1st	5th	
Four Continents Championships			4th	3rd	1st	2nd	
Grand Prix Final				4th	3rd	WD	6th
Canadian Championships	6th	C	3rd	1st	1st	1st	2nd
World Team Trophy				6th (4th)		5th (4th)	
GP Cup of China					1st		
GP Finland						1st	
GP France				1st			2nd
GP Skate America				2nd			
GP Skate Canada					1st	1st	1st
CS Autumn Classic			4th		1st		
CS John Nicks Pairs							1st
CS Nebelhorn Trophy				1st		2nd	
CS Warsaw Cup			6th				
Skate Canada Challenge	3rd	3rd	1st				
Warsaw Cup							1st

=== Pair skating with Nathan Bartholomay (for the United States) ===
Competition placements at senior level
Season	2016–17	2017–18	2018–19
World Championships		17th	
Four Continents Championships		5th	
U.S. Championships	4th	3rd	3rd
GP Finland			6th
GP Skate America		8th	
CS Finlandia Trophy		6th	
CS Golden Spin of Zagreb	6th		3rd
CS Nebelhorn Trophy			3rd
CS Ondrej Nepela Trophy			2nd
CS U.S. Classic		6th	

=== Single skating (for the United States) ===
Competition placements at senior level
Season	2000–01
U.S. Championships	WD
GP Skate Canada	5th
Karl Schäfer Memorial	2nd

Competition placements at junior level
Season	1999–2000
World Junior Championships	2nd
Junior Grand Prix Final	1st
U.S. Championships	9th
JGP Norway	1st
JGP Slovenia	5th

== Detailed results ==
=== Pair skating with Maxime Deschamps (for Canada) ===
ISU personal best scores in the +5/-5 GOE System
Segment	Type	Score	Event
Total	TSS	221.56	2024 World Championships
Short program	TSS	77.48	2024 World Championships
Short program	TES	42.05	2024 World Championships
Short program	PCS	35.43	2024 World Championships
Free skating	TSS	144.08	2024 World Championships
Free skating	TES	74.70	2023 Skate Canada International
Free skating	PCS	71.13	2024 World Championships

- Small medals for the short program and free skating are only awarded at ISU Championships.
- Medals at team events are awarded for the team results only. Individual placements at team events are listed in parentheses.

Results in the 2019–20 season
Date	Event	SP		FS		Total	
Date	Event	P	Score	P	Score	P	Score
Nov 27 – Dec 1, 2019	2020 Skate Canada Challenge	1	64.28	3	101.28	3	165.56
Jan 13–19, 2020	(Canada) 2020 Canadian Championships	6	57.06	5	113.30	6	170.36

Results in the 2020–21 season
Date	Event	SP		FS		Total	
Date	Event	P	Score	P	Score	P	Score
Jan 8–9, 2021	2021 Skate Canada Challenge	2	61.19	4	109.46	3	170.65

Results in the 2021–22 season
Date	Event	SP		FS		Total	
Date	Event	P	Score	P	Score	P	Score
Sep 16–18, 2021	(Canada) 2021 CS Autumn Classic International	4	57.83	3	112.08	4	169.91
Nov 17–20, 2021	(Poland) 2021 CS Warsaw Cup	11	57.88	6	114.85	6	172.73
Nov 30 – Dec 3, 2021	2022 Skate Canada Challenge	1	65.28	1	111.55	1	176.83
Jan 6–12, 2022	(Canada) 2022 Canadian Championships	3	63.54	4	115.06	3	178.60
Jan 18–23, 2022	(Estonia) 2022 Four Continents Championships	5	59.07	4	113.64	4	172.71

Results in the 2022–23 season
Date	Event	SP		FS		Total	
Date	Event	P	Score	P	Score	P	Score
Sep 21–24, 2022	(Germany) 2022 CS Nebelhorn Trophy	2	68.08	1	124.66	1	192.74
Oct 21–23, 2022	(United States) 2022 Skate America	2	73.05	2	124.84	2	197.89
Nov 4–6, 2022	2022 Grand Prix de France	1	64.33	1	121.51	1	185.84
Dec 8–11, 2022	(Italy) 2022–23 Grand Prix Final	3	69.34	5	114.94	4	184.28
Jan 9–15, 2023	(Canada) 2023 Canadian Championships	1	73.20	1	125.98	1	199.18
Feb 7–12, 2023	(United States) 2023 Four Continents Championships	2	68.39	3	125.45	3	193.84
Mar 22–26, 2023	(Japan) 2023 World Championships	4	72.81	6	127.16	4	199.97
Apr 13–16, 2023	(Japan) 2023 World Team Trophy	3	70.20	4	129.73	6 (4)	199.93

Results in the 2023–24 season
Date	Event	SP		FS		Total	
Date	Event	P	Score	P	Score	P	Score
Sep 14–17, 2023	(Canada) 2023 CS Autumn Classic International	1	71.80	1	131.82	1	203.62
Oct 27–29, 2023	2023 Skate Canada International	1	72.25	1	142.39	1	214.64
Nov 10–12, 2023	2023 Cup of China	1	70.39	1	131.09	1	201.48
Dec 7–10, 2023	(China) 2023–24 Grand Prix Final	2	71.22	3	133.08	3	204.30
Jan 8–14, 2024	(Canada) 2024 Canadian Championships	1	66.86	1	138.93	1	205.79
Jan 30 – Feb 4, 2024	(China) 2024 Four Continents Championships	1	69.48	1	129.32	1	198.80
Mar 18–24, 2024	(Canada) 2024 World Championships	1	77.48	2	144.08	1	221.56

Results in the 2024–25 season
Date	Event	SP		FS		Total	
Date	Event	P	Score	P	Score	P	Score
Sep 18–21, 2024	(Germany) 2024 CS Nebelhorn Trophy	3	72.42	2	133.82	2	206.24
Oct 25–27, 2024	2024 Skate Canada International	1	73.23	2	124.10	1	197.33
Nov 15–17, 2024	(Finland) 2024 Finlandia Trophy	1	75.89	1	131.55	1	207.44
Jan 14–19, 2025	(Canada) 2025 Canadian Championships	1	76.31	2	130.75	1	207.06
Feb 19–23, 2025	(South Korea) 2025 Four Continents Championships	4	69.66	2	141.26	2	210.92
Mar 25–30, 2025	(United States) 2025 World Championships	7	67.32	5	132.44	5	199.76
Apr 17–20, 2025	(Japan) 2025 World Team Trophy	4	66.65	4	134.35	5 (4)	201.00

Results in the 2025–26 season
Date	Event	SP		FS		Total	
Date	Event	P	Score	P	Score	P	Score
Sep 2–3, 2025	(United States) 2025 CS John Nicks International Pairs Competition	1	70.77	1	128.66	1	199.43
Oct 17–19, 2025	2025 Grand Prix de France	2	74.26	2	123.40	2	197.66
Oct 31 – Nov 2, 2025	2025 Skate Canada International	2	73.03	1	140.37	1	213.40
Nov 19–23, 2025	(Poland) 2025 Warsaw Cup	1	75.46	1	119.46	1	194.92
Dec 4–7, 2025	(Japan) 2025-26 Grand Prix Final	6	71.07	6	123.29	6	194.36
Jan 5–11, 2026	(Canada) 2026 Canadian Championships	1	78.35	3	123.01	2	201.36
Feb 6–19, 2026	(Italy) 2026 Winter Olympics	14	66.04	9	126.57	11	192.61

=== Pair skating with Nathan Bartholomay (for the United States) ===
ISU personal best scores in the +5/-5 GOE System
Segment	Type	Score	Event
Total	TSS	176.44	2018 CS Golden Spin of Zagreb
Short program	TSS	60.12	2018 CS Golden Spin of Zagreb
Short program	TES	32.32	2018 CS Golden Spin of Zagreb
Short program	PCS	28.36	2018 CS Ondrej Nepela Trophy
Free skating	TSS	116.72	2018 CS Nebelhorn Trophy
Free skating	TES	58.92	2018 CS Golden Spin of Zagreb
Free skating	PCS	58.72	2018 CS Ondrej Nepela Trophy

ISU personal best scores in the +3/-3 GOE System
Segment	Type	Score	Event
Total	TSS	178.38	2018 Four Continents Championships
Short program	TSS	61.48	2018 World Championships
Short program	TES	34.15	2018 Four Continents Championships
Short program	PCS	28.37	2018 World Championships
Free skating	TSS	117.45	2018 Four Continents Championships
Free skating	TES	62.13	2018 Four Continents Championships
Free skating	PCS	56.32	2018 Four Continents Championships

- At national events in the United States, pewter medals are awarded for fourth place.

Results in the 2016–17 season
Date	Event	SP		FS		Total	
Date	Event	P	Score	P	Score	P	Score
Dec 7–10, 2016	(Croatia) 2016 CS Golden Spin of Zagreb	8	48.14	5	102.62	6	150.76
Jan 14–22, 2017	(United States) 2017 U.S. Championships	3	65.04	5	108.46	4	173.50

Results in the 2017–18 season
Date	Event	SP		FS		Total	
Date	Event	P	Score	P	Score	P	Score
Sep 13–16, 2017	(United States) 2017 U.S. International Classic	4	58.24	7	107.12	6	165.36
Oct 6–8, 2017	(Finland) 2017 CS Finlandia Trophy	7	50.90	6	110.27	6	161.17
Nov 24–26, 2017	(United States) 2017 Skate America	8	57.18	8	107.82	8	165.00
Jan 3–7, 2018	(United States) 2018 U.S. Championships	3	67.84	3	129.81	3	197.65
Jan 22–28, 2018	(Taiwan) 2018 Four Continents Championships	6	60.93	4	117.45	5	178.38
Mar 19–25, 2018	(Italy) 2018 World Championships	17	61.48	–	–	17	61.48

Results in the 2018–19 season
Date	Event	SP		FS		Total	
Date	Event	P	Score	P	Score	P	Score
Sep 19–22, 2018	(Slovakia) 2018 CS Ondrej Nepela Trophy	3	59.60	2	115.18	3	174.78
Sep 26–29, 2018	(Germany) 2018 CS Nebelhorn Trophy	3	58.19	2	116.72	3	174.91
Nov 2–4, 2018	(Finland) 2018 Grand Prix of Helsinki	6	56.44	6	102.77	6	159.21
Dec 5–8, 2018	(Croatia) 2018 CS Golden Spin of Zagreb	5	60.12	3	116.32	3	176.44
Jan 19–27, 2019	(United States) 2019 U.S. Championships	4	68.18	3	131.74	3	199.92
