= Maxime Deschamps =

Canadian pair skater (born 1991)

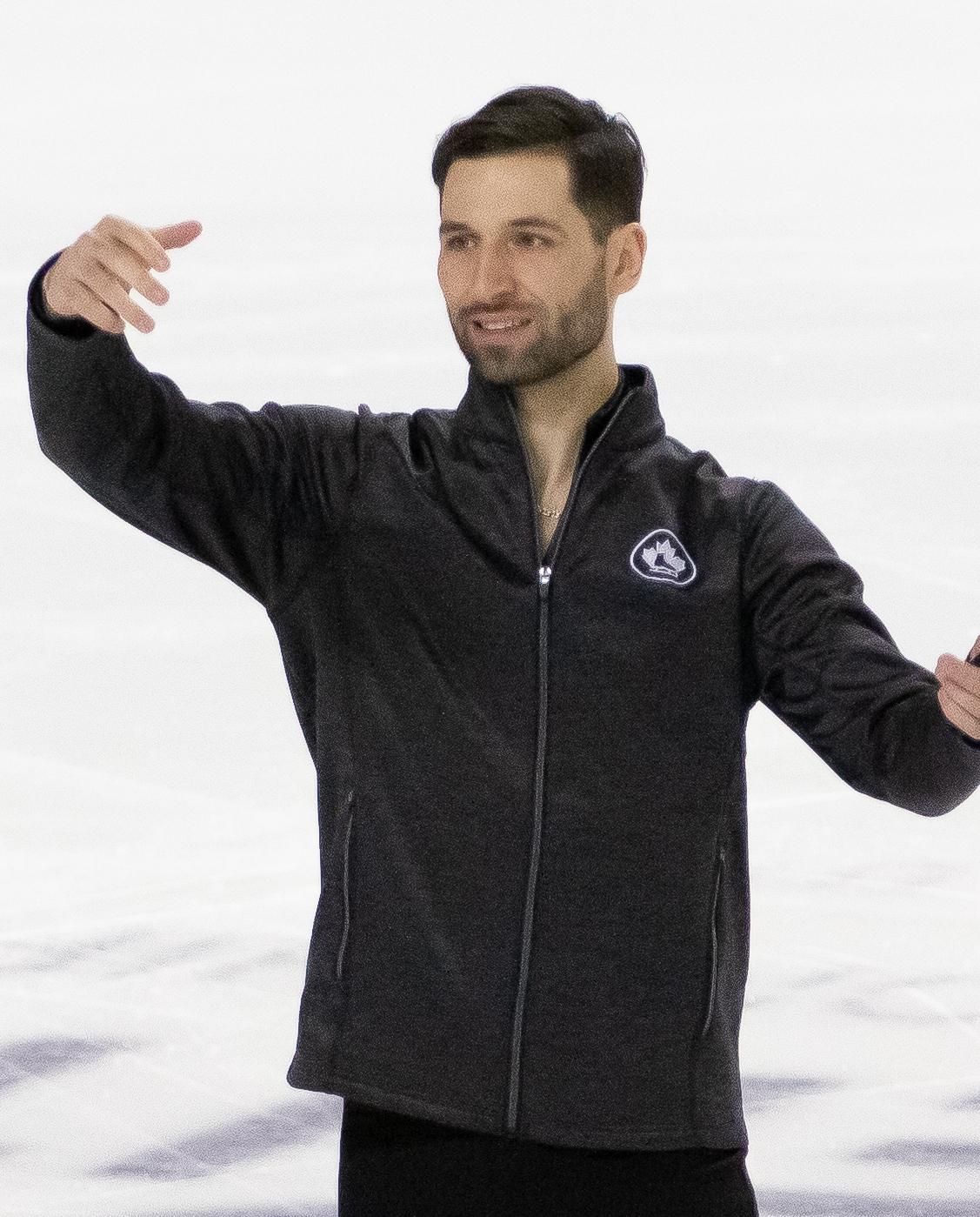
- Deschamps at the 2023 Four Continents Championships

Personal information
- Born: December 20, 1991 (age 34) Vaudreuil-Dorion, Quebec, Canada
- Height: 1.85 m (6 ft 1 in)

Figure skating career
- Country: Canada
- Discipline: Pair skating
- Partner: Deanna Stellato-Dudek (2019–26); Sydney Kolodziej (2016–18); Vanessa Grenier (2013–16)
- Coach: Josée Picard; Stéphanie Fiorito; Manon Peron
- Skating club: CPAR Vaudreuil
- Began skating: 1997
- Retired: July 7, 2026

Medal record
World Championships
Gold medal – first place	2024 Montreal	Pairs
Four Continents Championships
Gold medal – first place	2024 Shanghai	Pairs
Silver medal – second place	2025 Seoul	Pairs
Bronze medal – third place	2023 Colorado Springs	Pairs
Grand Prix Final
Bronze medal – third place	2023–24 Beijing	Pairs
Canadian Championships
Gold medal – first place	2023 Oshawa	Pairs
Gold medal – first place	2024 Calgary	Pairs
Gold medal – first place	2025 Laval	Pairs
Silver medal – second place	2026 Gatineau	Pairs
Bronze medal – third place	2022 Ottawa	Pairs

Maxime Deschamps (born December 20, 1991) is a Canadian retired pair skater. With his skating partner, Deanna Stellato-Dudek, he is the 2024 World champion, the 2024 Four Continents champion, 2023–24 Grand Prix Final bronze medallist, an eight-time ISU Grand Prix medallist, a three-time ISU Challenger Series gold medalist, and three-time Canadian national champion (2023–2025).

He and Stellato-Dudek are also the first pair team to perform an assisted backflip in an ISU competition.

With Vanessa Grenier and Sydney Kolodziej, he has competed at two Four Continents Championships (2016, 2018) and four Grand Prix events.

== Personal life ==
Deschamps has attention deficit hyperactivity disorder. With respect to its impact on his competitive career, he has said "when I come into competitions, concentration is really easy for me. It's mostly at home where it's challenging on a daily basis."

== Career ==
=== Early years ===
Deschamps began learning to skate in 1997. He placed 6th in novice pairs with Alysson Dugas at the 2010 Canadian Championships, 10th in junior pairs with Catherine Baldé at the 2011 Canadian Championships, and 7th in junior pairs with Naomie Boudreau at the 2013 Canadian Championships.

=== Partnership with Grenier ===
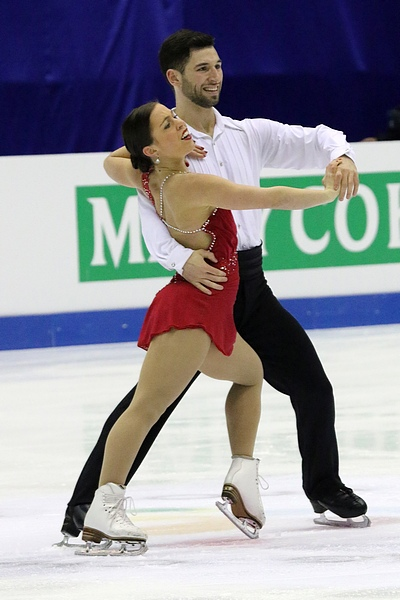
Deschamps/Grenier at the 2016 Four Continents Championships

In 2013, Deschamps teamed up with Vanessa Grenier. The two became the 2014 Canadian junior champions. Making their Grand Prix debut, they placed 6th at the 2014 Skate America. The pair finished 7th at the 2015 Skate Canada International and 8th at the 2016 Four Continents Championships. They were coached by Richard Gauthier and Bruno Marcotte in Montreal, Quebec. Grenier and Deschamps split up in May 2016.

=== Partnership with Kolodziej ===
In 2016, Deschamps teamed up with Sydney Kolodziej from the United States. The pair finished 6th at the 2017 Canadian Championships, ranking 6th in the short program and 4th in the free skate.

Coached by Richard Gauthier, Bruno Marcotte, and Sylvie Fullum in Saint-Leonard, Quebec, Kolodziej/Deschamps made their international debut as a pair in September at the 2017 CS U.S. Classic, where they placed 7th. Skate Canada also selected the pair to compete at a Grand Prix event, the 2017 Skate Canada International. They finished 8th at their Grand Prix assignment and 7th at the 2018 Canadian Championships. They were named in Canada's team to the 2018 Four Continents Championships in Taipei and finished 9th after placing 8th in the short program and 9th in the free skate.

=== Partnership with Stellato-Dudek ===
Deschamps announced a new partnership with American skater Deanna Stellato-Dudek in 2019. After securing her release from the USFS, they debuted internationally at the 2021 CS Autumn Classic International, placing fourth. They won the bronze medal at the 2022 Canadian Championships. Stellato/Deschamps went on to finish fourth at the 2022 Four Continents Championships, and first at the 2024 Four Continents Championships.

==== 2022–23 season: First national title and Four Continents bronze ====
Stellato-Dudek/Deschamps began the 2022–23 season with a gold medal at the 2022 CS Nebelhorn Trophy. The team was then invited to make their Grand Prix debut at the 2022 Skate America, and won the silver medal, only 3.5 points behind gold medalists Knierim/Frazier. This was the first Grand Prix medal for both skaters. They travelled to Angers for the 2022 Grand Prix de France, their second Grand Prix event, and won the gold medal. This was the first Grand Prix win for both skaters. Their results qualified them for the Grand Prix Final. Stellato-Dudek/Deschamps entered the event considered likely bronze medalists and placed third in the short program, distantly behind top-ranked teams Knierim/Frazier and Japan's Miura/Kihara and 2.04 points of Italians Conti/Macii. Stellato-Dudek said she was pleased by the result, revealing that she had "got really ill" in recent weeks and "had to take time off the ice and off the training, and I lost weight, and I lost muscles, so we were training very hard to try and be ready for here." However, the team struggled in the free skate, placing fifth in that segment and dropping behind the Italians for fourth overall. She called this a disappointment but said it was understandable in light of their training difficulties.

Stellato-Dudek continued to experience health difficulties in the aftermath of the Final, presumed to be a result of respiratory syncytial virus infection, which made her unable to breathe through her mouth. She had limited medical options for dealing with the virus given the need to remain compliant with WADA guidelines. Despite these difficulties, the pair resolved to compete at the 2023 Canadian Championships, with Stellato-Dudek explaining that "I want it so badly because I want it for Max so much, because this is his tenth Canadian championship and last year I was so proud, I was the first partner you got a medal with in senior. So, to be the partner that brings him the gold would be really special to me." They won the gold medal by a margin of 11.92 points over silver medallists McIntosh/Mimar.

Following the national championships, Stellato-Dudek eventually recovered from the extended illness, and was assessed as being at "100% of her physical power" for a week in advance of the 2023 Four Continents Championships. They finished second in the short program despite her stepping out of their throw jump. The free skate proved somewhat more difficult, with Deschamps falling on an attempt at the triple Salchow jump. They were third in that segment, albeit with a new personal best score, and won the bronze medal. This was the first ISU championship medal of Deschamps' career.

Stellato-Dudek/Deschamps placed fourth in the short program at the 2023 World Championships in Saitama, only 0.43 points behind Conti/Macii in third. Both erred on their triple Salchow attempt in the free skate, and they finished sixth in that segment, but remained in fourth overall. Stellato-Dudek/Deschamps then joined Team Canada for the 2023 World Team Trophy, where they came third in the short program, narrowly beating Conti/Macii. They were fourth in the free skate, while Team Canada finished sixth overall.

==== 2023–24 season: World and Four Continents champions, Grand Prix Final bronze ====
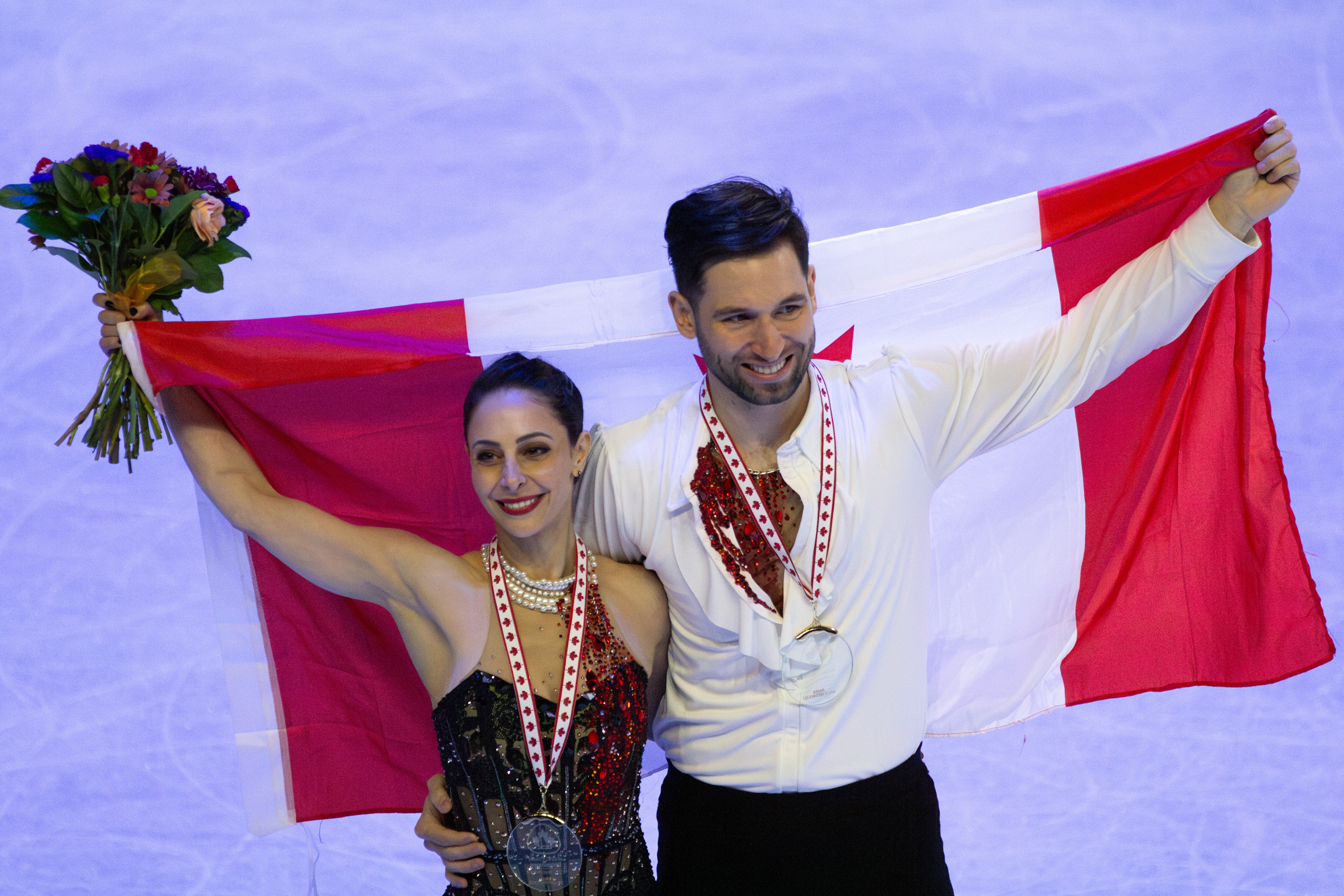
Stellato-Dudek & Deschamps at 2023 Skate Canada International

In anticipation of Deschamps' home province hosting the 2024 World Championships in Montreal, the duo selected Cirque du Soleil's "Oxygène" as a homage to French Canadian culture. Their Interview with the Vampire free program featured Stellato-Dudek acting the part of a vampire.

Beginning the season at the 2023 CS Autumn Classic International, Stellato-Dudek/Deschamps won gold. They set new personal bests in the free skate and total score, passing 200 points in the latter for the first time. On the Grand Prix, they competed first at the 2023 Skate Canada International, placing first in both segments to win the gold medal. They broke the 140-point threshold in the free skate for the first time, and set a new personal best in total score as well. Stellato-Dudek commented afterward: "I am very happy, which is a rarity. We have been waiting for a performance like this for years!" At the 2023 Cup of China, they won the segment and earned a 4.06-point lead over Italians Ghilardi/Ambrosini, despite Stellato-Dudek putting a hand down on their throw. “We are happy our three-week marathon of competitions and travel is over,” Stellato-Dudek said. “We will check the protocols to see where we can improve. This week was a test to our mental and physical strength.” They said the event was a test for them given the travel to China. The free skate proved more difficult, including an aborted final lift, but they still won that segment as well and took another Grand Prix gold. She said afterward that they were "exhausted at the start of the program and it was fight from beginning to the end, but we are happy with the outcome."

Stellato-Dudek/Deschamps entered the 2023–24 Grand Prix Final as one of the perceived gold medal contenders. After minor mistakes on their jump and throw, they finished narrowly second in the short program, 1.34 points back of new German team Hase/Volodin and 0.92 ahead of Italians Conti/Macii in third. They had problems with both jumps and throws in the free skate as well, dropping to third place overall, albeit 2.13 points back of first. Both said that they had higher expectations, but Stellato-Dudek added that "we showed that even with big mistakes on the elements, we can score pretty high."

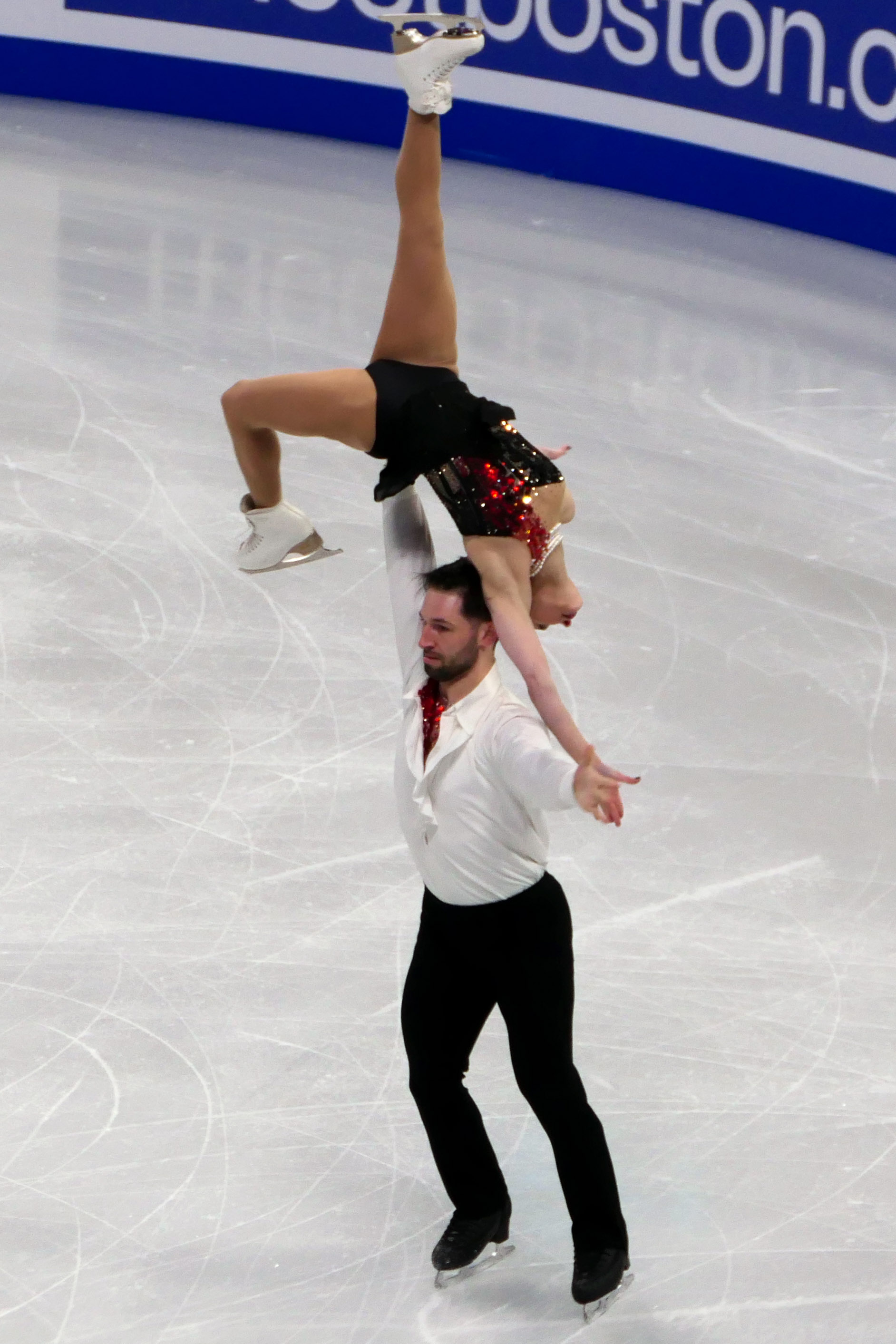
Stellato-Dudek and Deschamps perform a lift at the end of their free skate at the 2024 World Championships.

At the 2024 Canadian Championships, the duo finished first in the short program, but only by 0.82 points over Pereira/Michaud after errors on both their throw and side-by-side jumps. Despite jump errors in the free skate Stellato-Dudek/Deschamps won that segment by a wide margin and took their second consecutive national title. They both said that they had done considerable work on throw improvements in the leadup.

Returning to China for the third time that season for the 2024 Four Continents Championships in Shanghai, where Stellato-Dudek/Deschamps faced reigning Japanese world champions Miura/Kihara, who were returning to competition after an absence due to injury. The Canadians won the short program despite Deschamps falling on his triple toe loop attempt. They won the free skate as well, despite Stellato-Dudek hurting her arm on the landing of their opening triple twist and a later jump error by Deschamps, and took their first Four Continents title. Saying they were very happy with the result, Stellato-Dudek added there was "definitely still a lot of growth in the performance, we know we can do a lot better than that, and we're looking forward to doing that at Worlds."

At the World Championships, Stellato-Dudek/Deschamps won the short program with a new personal best score of 77.48, an advantage of 3.95 points over Miura/Kihara in second place. In the free skate, Stellato-Dudek stepped out of the end of her jump combination attempt, but the program was otherwise clean. The team came second in that segment, 0.27 points behind Miura/Kihara, but remained in first place overall and took the gold medal. This was the first World title for a Canadian pair since Duhamel/Radford in 2016, and the first for Canada in any discipline since Kaetlyn Osmond in 2018. Deschamps said that he "felt nothing but pride" at their performance and the result, which attracted significant media coverage for the team due to Stellato-Dudek's becoming the oldest-ever figure skating World champion in any discipline.

==== 2024–25 season: Four Continents silver ====
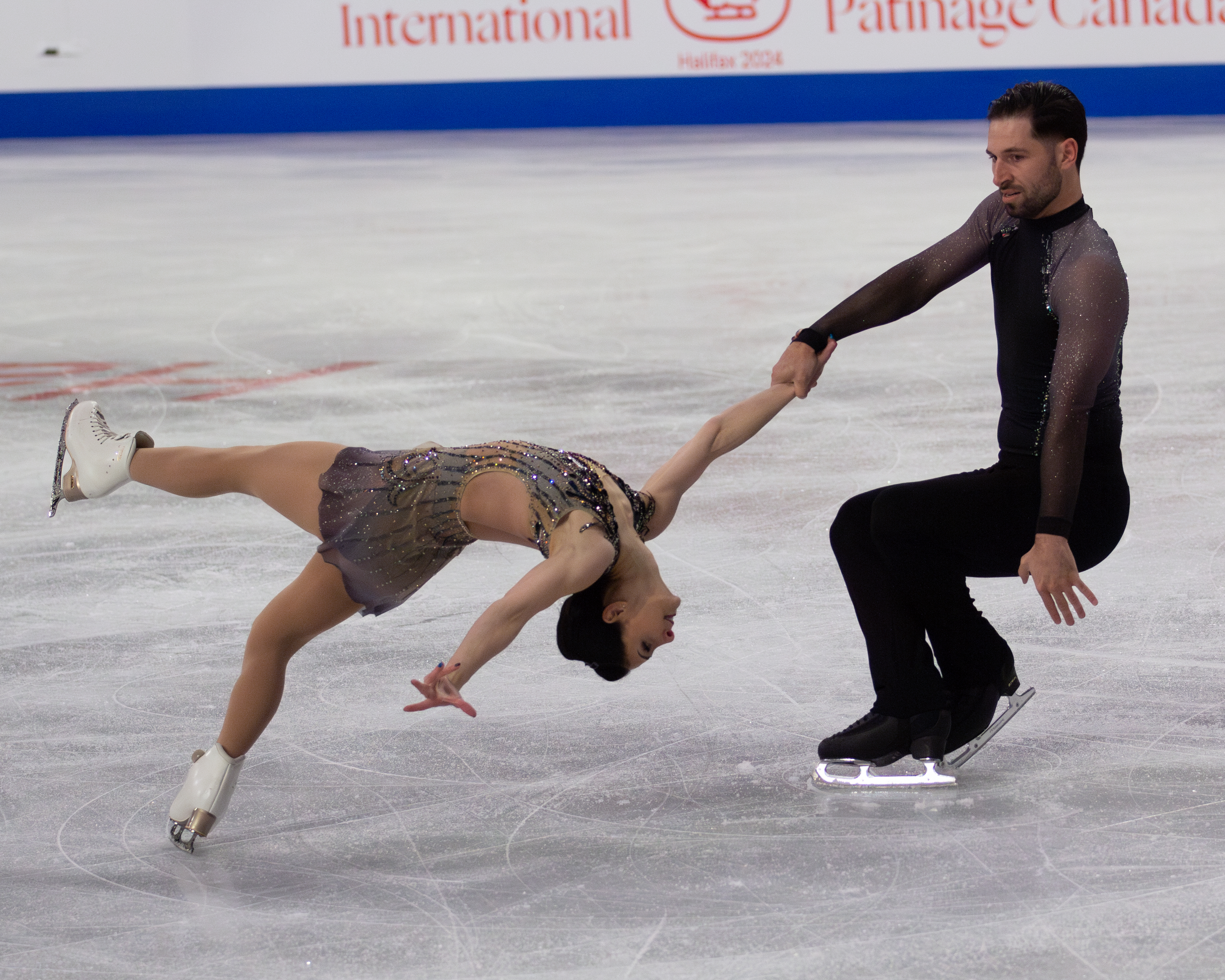
Stellato-Dudek and Deschamps perform a death spiral during their short program at 2024 Skate Canada International.

Stellato-Dudek/Deschamps began the season by winning silver at the 2024 CS Nebelhorn Trophy behind Hase/Volodin. Going on to compete on the 2024–25 Grand Prix series, the pair won the short program at 2024 Skate Canada International with an almost nine-point lead over the teams in second and third place. However, they made several mistakes in the free skate and placed second in that segment of the competition, although their lead after the short program was enough to hang onto first place. Following the event, Deschamps said, "That was certainly not easy tonight. It was going well at home, but it's gonna happen sometimes."

Three weeks later, the pair would deliver stronger performances at the 2024 Finlandia Trophy, where they won a second Grand Prix gold medal. Stellato-Dudek had a fluke fall in the free skate, but said she felt it went better than at Skate Canada. They subsequently qualified for the 2024–25 Grand Prix Final. In the leadup to the Final, however, Deschamps fell ill, beginning with a fever that lasted four days. They ultimately had to withdraw from the Final.

On December 11, less than a week after their withdrawal from the Grand Prix Final, Stellato-Dudek took the Canadian oath of citizenship, resolving the team's longstanding questions around eligibility to compete at the 2026 Winter Olympics. The team next competed at the 2025 Canadian Championships, seeking a third consecutive national title. Stellato-Dudek/Deschamps won the short program with only a step-out on their throw jump. The free skate was more difficult, with a number of errors on jumps and throws, as well as a time violation deduction, and they came second in that segment behind Pereira/Michaud. Remaining first overall, they took the gold medal. Deschamps expressed frustration with the performance, adding "we won, but it’s not just about winning, it’s about what we put out on the ice. We want to do better, obviously.”"

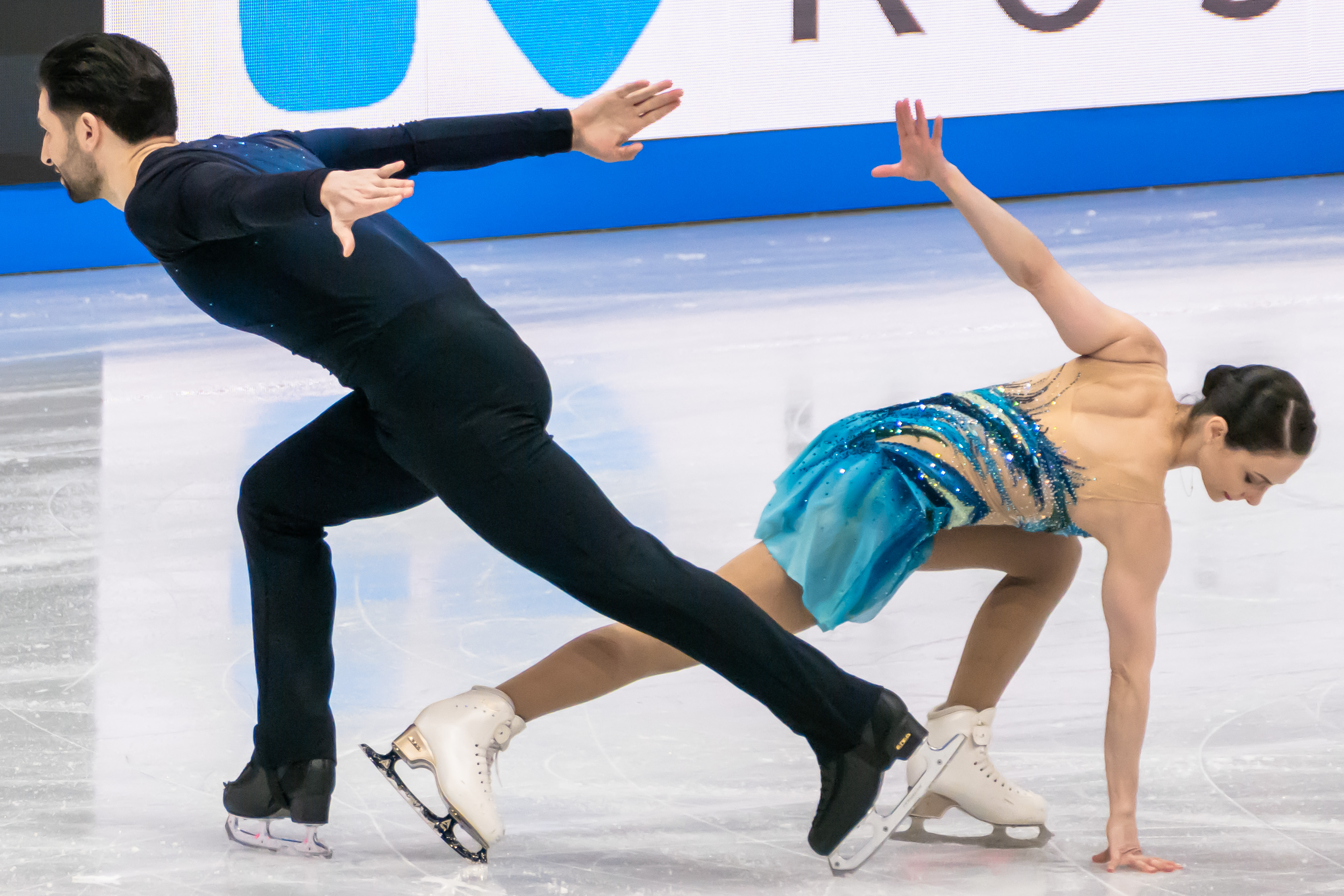
Stellato-Dudek and Deschamps in their starting position at the 2025 World Championships

In the short program at the 2025 Four Continents Championships, Stellato-Dudek/Deschamps struggled somewhat, with Deschamps' triple toe landing imperfect and Stellato-Dudek putting a hand down on their throw triple loop. They came fourth in the segment, 0.13 points behind Pereira/Michaud in third. Speaking afterward, she again expressed frustration, noting as well that she had hurt her hip on a choreographic practice beforehand. The team then had a strong free skate, the only error being another touchdown by her on the throw triple loop element, coming second in the segment with a season's best score of 141.26 and rising to second place overall. Deschamps remarked afterward that "the whole year we haven't been able to pull it out in competition," but after the difficulties in the short program they were "just able to go out today and just go skate free and have fun and attack everything. That's what we haven't been doing this season."

Going on to compete at the 2025 World Championships, Stellato-Dudek/Deschamps placed seventh in the short program and fifth in the free skate, finishing in fifth place overall. Reflecting on the event, Stellato-Dudek shared in an interview following the free skate, "Yesterday [the short program] was really kind of disappointing, today felt much better. It was a good bounce back. I’m a little bit disappointed about the toeloop. I haven’t missed one in two years, so that’s kind of upsetting. We were told that this season, going into everything as defending champions, would be difficult, but now we actually know what it means. A person who’s been in figure skating for more than 50 years told us that it’s probably a good thing to give that burden of being the defending world champion going into the Olympic season to someone else. Now I’m really hungry for next season. I feel like I am better at attacking."

Selected to compete for Team Canada at the 2025 World Team Trophy, Stellato-Dudek/Deschamps placed fourth in all segments of the pairs event and Team Canada finished fifth overall. “This competition was tough,” said Stellato-Dudek. “You’re tired coming in and then the big jet lag for us from North America, and I was like, ‘oh this long program is going to be tough!’ It was harder than I thought it was going to be. I changed the position of my forward outside death spiral. It wasn’t for the level, it was for GOE.”

==== 2025–26 season: Milano Cortina Olympics ====
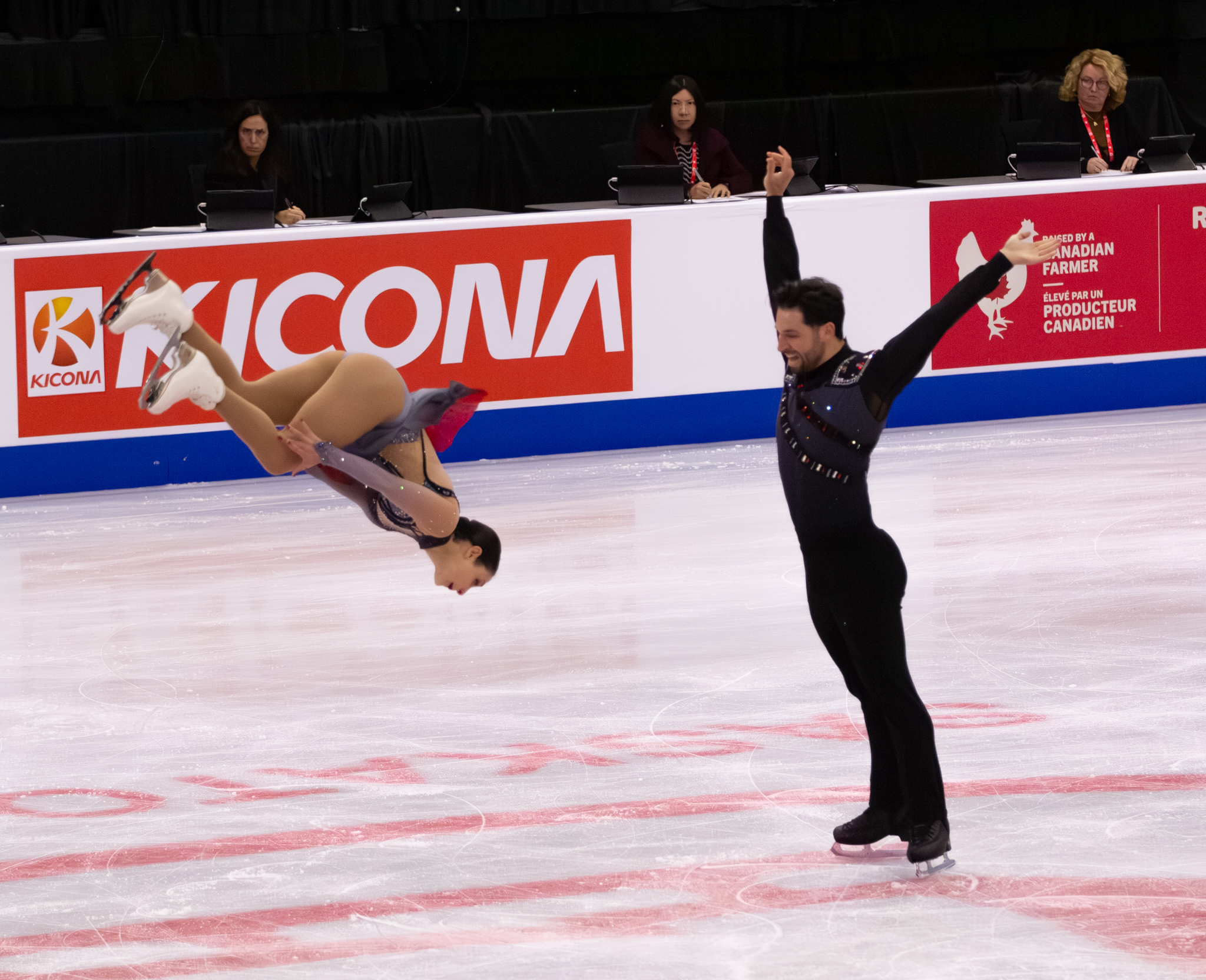
Stellato-Dudek and Deschamps performing their assisted backflip at the 2025 Skate Canada International

Stellato-Dudek/Deschamps started their season in early September by winning gold at the 2025 CS John Nicks International Pairs Competition. During the event, Stellato-Dudek/Deschamps became the first pair team to perform an assisted backflip in an ISU competition.

They then went on to win the silver medal at the 2025 Grand Prix de France. "For me, winning the medal means that we fought through, and despite the mistakes, we didn't give up," said Stellato-Dudek after the free skate.

Two weeks later, Stellato-Dudek and Deschamps competed at 2025 Skate Canada International where they won their third consecutive Skate Canada International title. The team placed second in the short program after some mistakes. “For us, it was more attack than what we did in France,” said Deschamps when comparing the performances. “We got some little silly mistakes on some stuff, but it’s okay. We’ll get back and work on them to make sure that doesn’t happen.” Stellato-Dudek and Deschamps went on to place first in the free skate with a new season's best, moving up first place overall. “We’ve won Skate Canada before, but this one, it holds so much weight being in the big year,” said Stellato-Dudek. “We’re just really proud that we can have this victory in front of a home crowd.”

The following month, the duo finished sixth at the 2025–26 Grand Prix Final. "I don't really know what to say when it's like so far from how we practice," said Stellato-Dudek after the free skate. "We felt ready and everything," added Deschamps. "We had some good performances, but we need to do it more often, it's not enough right now. We will take a week off to recover."

In January, Stellato-Dudek/Deschamps competed at the 2026 Canadian Championships as the heavy favourites. Shortly before the event, Stellato-Dudek fell ill with a stomach bug. Despite this, Stellato-Dudek/Deschamps won the short program by a nine-point margin over Pereira/Michaud. Their free program, however, was riddled with errors, allowing Pereira/Michaud to capture the gold medal ahead of them. Stellato-Dudek/Deschamps were subsequently named to the 2026 Winter Olympic team.

On 2 February, days before the start of the 2026 Winter Olympics Figure Skating Team Event, the Canadian Olympic Committee announced that Stellato-Dudek/Deschamps would be unable to participate due to Stellato-Dudek sustaining an injury during training. They further stated that Stellato-Dudek's condition would be closely monitored to determine whether she and Deschamps will be able to partake in the Individual Pairs Event set to take place the following week. On 10 February, it was announced that Stellato-Dudek had been cleared to compete in the individual pair skating event despite having hit her head during a training accident.

The team went on to compete in the pairs' individual event at the 2026 Winter Olympics where they placed 11th overall. “We lost two weeks of training leading up to this,” said Stellato-Dudek after the free skate. “We had to make some strategic decisions going into the free program. But the way that we held that together after not doing a run-through for two weeks is pretty amazing. I joke with Maxim that he literally and figuratively always carries me through when I’m having a hard time, and he did not disappoint tonight.”

In July, Deschamps announced he was retiring from competitive skating.

== Programs ==
=== Pair skating with Deanna Stellato-Dudek ===
Season	Short program	Free skating	Exhibition
2025–2026	Carmina Burana; In trutina; O Fortuna by Carl Orff choreo. by Lori Nichol	Poeta en el Mar; Amor Dulce Muerte by Vicente Amigo choreo. by Lori Nichol	Limbo Rock; Let's Twist Again by Chubby Checker
2024–2025	Crazy in Love (Fifty Shades of Grey Remix) by Beyoncé choreo. by Julie Marcotte	Siren's Song by Andrea Krux; Mobula Rays (from Blue Planet II) by Hans Zimmer, David Fleming, & Jacob Shea; Lux by Ryan Taubert; The Blue Planet (from Blue Planet II) by Hans Zimmer, David Fleming, & Jacob Shea choreo. by Julie Marcotte	Limbo Rock; Let's Twist Again by Chubby Checker; All I Ask by Adele
2023–2024	Oxygène by Cirque du Soleil, Germain Gauthier, Jean-Philippe Goncalves, & Béatrice Bonifassi choreo. by Julie Marcotte	Interview with the Vampire by Daniel Hart choreo. by Julie Marcotte	All I Ask by Adele
2022–2023	Oblivion by Astor Piazzolla performed by +Tango choreo. by Julie Marcotte	Cleopatra by Trevor Jones choreo. by Julie Marcotte	Keeping Me Alive (Acoustic) by Jonathan Roy
2021–2022	No Ordinary Love by You+Me choreo. by Julie Marcotte	(I Just) Died in Your Arms by Cutting Crew performed by Hidden Citizens choreo. by Julie Marcotte	
2019–2020	New York State of Mind by Billy Joel performed by Barbra Streisand choreo. by Julie Marcotte	Divenire by Ludovico Einaudi performed by Angèle Dubeau & La Pietà choreo. by Julie Marcotte	

=== With Kolodziej ===
Season	Short program	Free skating
2017–2018	Satellite by Colin James; Surely (I Love You) by James Bracken, Mickey Oliver performed by Colin James and the Little Big Band	Far from the Madding Crowd by Craig Armstrong; Opening; Love Theme; End Credits
2016–2017	Desert Rose by Sting	

=== With Grenier ===
Season	Short program	Free skating
2015–2016	Por una cabeza by Carlos Gardel choreo. by Julie Marcotte	Don Juan DeMarco by Michael Kamen; Have You Ever Really Loved a Woman?; Doña Julia; I Was Born In Mexico; Arabia choreo. by Julie Marcotte
2014–2015	Cheek to Cheek by Ella Fitzgerald; Heaven by Bryan Adams choreo. by Julie Marcotte	Somewhere in Time by John Barry; Somewhere in Time performed by Maksim Mrvica; The Old Woman; Theme from Somewhere in Time with 18th Variation of Rachmaninov performed by Newell Oler choreo. by Julie Marcotte

== Competitive highlights ==
- GP – Event of the ISU Grand Prix Series
- CS – Event of the ISU Challenger Series
- C – Competition was cancelled
- TBD – Assigned
- WD – Withdrew from competition
- Medals at team events are awarded for the team results only. Individual placements at team events are listed in parentheses.

=== Pair skating with Deanna Stellato-Dudek ===
Competition placements at senior level
Season	2019–20	2020–21	2021–22	2022–23	2023–24	2024–25	2025–26
Winter Olympics							11th
World Championships				4th	1st	5th	
Four Continents Championships			4th	3rd	1st	2nd	
Grand Prix Final				4th	3rd	WD	6th
Canadian Championships	6th	C	3rd	1st	1st	1st	2nd
World Team Trophy				6th (4th)		5th (4th)	
GP Cup of China					1st		
GP Finland						1st	
GP France				1st			2nd
GP Skate America				2nd			
GP Skate Canada					1st	1st	1st
CS Autumn Classic			4th		1st		
CS John Nicks Pairs							1st
CS Nebelhorn Trophy				1st		2nd	
CS Warsaw Cup			6th				
Skate Canada Challenge	3rd	3rd	1st				
Warsaw Cup							1st

=== Pair skating with Sydney Kolodziej ===
Competition placements at senior level
Season	2016–17	2017–18
Four Continents Championships		9th
Canadian Championships	6th	7th
GP Skate Canada		8th
CS U.S. Classic		7th
Skate Canada Challenge		3rd

=== Pair skating with Vanessa Grenier ===
Competition placements at senior level
Season	2013–14	2014–15	2015–16
Four Continents Championships			8th
Canadian Championships	1st J	5th	5th
GP Cup of China			8th
GP Skate America		6th	
GP Skate Canada			7th
CS Autumn Classic		5th	
CS Nebelhorn Trophy		5th	
CS U.S. Classic			4th

== Detailed results ==
=== Pair skating with Deanna Stellato-Dudek ===
ISU personal best scores in the +5/-5 GOE System
Segment	Type	Score	Event
Total	TSS	221.56	2024 World Championships
Short program	TSS	77.48	2024 World Championships
Short program	TES	42.05	2024 World Championships
Short program	PCS	35.43	2024 World Championships
Free skating	TSS	144.08	2024 World Championships
Free skating	TES	74.70	2023 Skate Canada International
Free skating	PCS	71.13	2024 World Championships

- Small medals for the short program and free skating are only awarded at ISU Championships.
- Medals at team events are awarded for the team results only. Individual placements at team events are listed in parentheses.

Results in the 2019–20 season
Date	Event	SP		FS		Total	
Date	Event	P	Score	P	Score	P	Score
Nov 27 – Dec 1, 2019	2020 Skate Canada Challenge	1	64.28	3	101.28	3	165.56
Jan 13–19, 2020	(Canada) 2020 Canadian Championships	6	57.06	5	113.30	6	170.36

Results in the 2020–21 season
Date	Event	SP		FS		Total	
Date	Event	P	Score	P	Score	P	Score
Jan 8–9, 2021	2021 Skate Canada Challenge	2	61.19	4	109.46	3	170.65

Results in the 2021–22 season
Date	Event	SP		FS		Total	
Date	Event	P	Score	P	Score	P	Score
Sep 16–18, 2021	(Canada) 2021 CS Autumn Classic International	4	57.83	3	112.08	4	169.91
Nov 17–20, 2021	(Poland) 2021 CS Warsaw Cup	11	57.88	6	114.85	6	172.73
Nov 30 – Dec 3, 2021	2022 Skate Canada Challenge	1	65.28	1	111.55	1	176.83
Jan 6–12, 2022	(Canada) 2022 Canadian Championships	3	63.54	4	115.06	3	178.60
Jan 18–23, 2022	(Estonia) 2022 Four Continents Championships	5	59.07	4	113.64	4	172.71

Results in the 2022–23 season
Date	Event	SP		FS		Total	
Date	Event	P	Score	P	Score	P	Score
Sep 21–24, 2022	(Germany) 2022 CS Nebelhorn Trophy	2	68.08	1	124.66	1	192.74
Oct 21–23, 2022	(United States) 2022 Skate America	2	73.05	2	124.84	2	197.89
Nov 4–6, 2022	2022 Grand Prix de France	1	64.33	1	121.51	1	185.84
Dec 8–11, 2022	(Italy) 2022–23 Grand Prix Final	3	69.34	5	114.94	4	184.28
Jan 9–15, 2023	(Canada) 2023 Canadian Championships	1	73.20	1	125.98	1	199.18
Feb 7–12, 2023	(United States) 2023 Four Continents Championships	2	68.39	3	125.45	3	193.84
Mar 22–26, 2023	(Japan) 2023 World Championships	4	72.81	6	127.16	4	199.97
Apr 13–16, 2023	(Japan) 2023 World Team Trophy	3	70.20	4	129.73	6 (4)	199.93

Results in the 2023–24 season
Date	Event	SP		FS		Total	
Date	Event	P	Score	P	Score	P	Score
Sep 14–17, 2023	(Canada) 2023 CS Autumn Classic International	1	71.80	1	131.82	1	203.62
Oct 27–29, 2023	2023 Skate Canada International	1	72.25	1	142.39	1	214.64
Nov 10–12, 2023	2023 Cup of China	1	70.39	1	131.09	1	201.48
Dec 7–10, 2023	(China) 2023–24 Grand Prix Final	2	71.22	3	133.08	3	204.30
Jan 8–14, 2024	(Canada) 2024 Canadian Championships	1	66.86	1	138.93	1	205.79
Jan 30 – Feb 4, 2024	(China) 2024 Four Continents Championships	1	69.48	1	129.32	1	198.80
Mar 18–24, 2024	(Canada) 2024 World Championships	1	77.48	2	144.08	1	221.56

Results in the 2024–25 season
Date	Event	SP		FS		Total	
Date	Event	P	Score	P	Score	P	Score
Sep 18–21, 2024	(Germany) 2024 CS Nebelhorn Trophy	3	72.42	2	133.82	2	206.24
Oct 25–27, 2024	2024 Skate Canada International	1	86.44	2	124.10	1	197.33
Nov 15–17, 2024	(Finland) 2024 Finlandia Trophy	1	75.89	1	131.55	1	207.44
Jan 14–19, 2025	(Canada) 2025 Canadian Championships	1	76.31	2	130.75	1	207.06
Feb 19–23, 2025	(South Korea) 2025 Four Continents Championships	4	69.66	2	141.26	2	210.92
Mar 25–30, 2025	(United States) 2025 World Championships	7	67.32	5	132.44	5	199.76
Apr 17–20, 2025	(Japan) 2025 World Team Trophy	4	66.65	4	134.35	5 (4)	201.00

Results in the 2025–26 season
Date	Event	SP		FS		Total	
Date	Event	P	Score	P	Score	P	Score
Sep 2–3, 2025	(United States) 2025 CS John Nicks International Pairs Competition	1	70.77	1	128.66	1	199.43
Oct 17–19, 2025	2025 Grand Prix de France	2	74.26	2	123.40	2	197.66
Oct 31 – Nov 2, 2025	2025 Skate Canada International	2	73.03	1	140.37	1	213.40
Nov 19–23, 2025	(Poland) 2025 Warsaw Cup	1	75.46	1	119.46	1	194.92
Dec 4–7, 2025	(Japan) 2025-26 Grand Prix Final	6	71.07	6	123.29	6	194.36
Jan 5–11, 2026	(Canada) 2026 Canadian Championships	1	78.35	3	123.01	2	201.36
Feb 6–19, 2026	(Italy) 2026 Winter Olympics	14	66.04	9	126.57	11	192.61
