= Mother Mary (soundtrack) =

2026 soundtrack album by Anne Hathaway

Mother Mary: Greatest Hits
- Standard edition cover

Soundtrack album by Anne Hathaway
- Released: April 17, 2026
- Length: 25:51
- Label: A24 Music
- Producers: Charli XCX; Jack Antonoff; George Daniel; FKA Twigs; Jeff Bhasker; Tobias Jesso Jr.; John Michael Rouchell; Koreless; Matteo Chiarenza Santini; Patrik Berger; Sounwave

Singles from Mother Mary: Greatest Hits
- 1. "Burial" Released: March 5, 2026; 2. "My Mouth Is Lonely For You" Released: April 1, 2026

Mother Mary: Greatest Hits is a soundtrack album performed by American actress Anne Hathaway, created for the psychological drama-thriller film Mother Mary. It was released on April 17, 2026, distributed through entertainment company A24, under its musical division. It was featured in the UK Album Downloads Chart upon release, becoming Hathaway's first solo album to be charted.

== Background ==
Mother Mary: Greatest Hits is Hathaway's solo album where she performed all the songs for the film. Previously, she had performed individual acts and duets in musical films. Besides, she also served as a songwriter for few songs, with collaborations from Charli XCX, Jack Antonoff and FKA Twigs, amongst several others.

Hathaway joined the project without having an iota of the how the songs that sound like, excluding the earlier demos of "Burial" and "Holy Spirit". She felt that the character's sound was "pretty low on totem pole" in the beginning, which unravels the inner vulnerability of the pop-star despite her cult-like status. It took her almost two years to find the appropriate sound for Mother Mary. Despite the songs were finished, she decided to tweak the vocals as she was not satisfied with it, and after few repeated attempts, she rerecorded all the tracks after finding the right sound that suited the character.

Despite her theater background and musical performances, Hathaway spent more time with Antonoff and Charli to record the soundtrack, not only exploring the vocal range but also how the music production works, changing minor lyrics and pushed on the type of sound layering which heard on Tori Amos' Little Earthquakes (1992) which served as the reference of the character Mary. "One of the things I realized is that lyrics are very important, but the feeling of the lyrics is the most important", Hathaway says, recalling how the band Earth, Wind & Fire recorded "September" (1978) where despite the meaning of the lyrics and song being not understandable, but went onto become a instantly recognizable hit, adding that "The way you perform the sound of a word is just as, if not more, important than the word itself."

FKA Twigs recalled that she liked the lyrics, although she knew it was not for her. Twigs provided two songs to Lowery, when the director need more, especially in a scene featuring the dress Mary requires for Sam; the song "My Mouth Is Lonely for You" was written for that sequence.

== Release ==
Mother Mary: Greatest Hits was announced on March 5, 2026, and preceded by "Burial" as the lead single from the album. Another song "My Mouth Is Lonely For You" was released as the second single on April 1. The soundtrack consisting of seven tracks, including the previous singles, was released on April 17, 2026. A24 also released a vinyl edition of the album, which accompanied the original score from Daniel Hart.

== Track listing ==
No.	Title	Writer(s)	Producer(s)	Length
1.	"Holy Spirit"	Charlotte Emma Aitchison; Jack Michael Antonoff; George Bedford Daniel; Anne Jacqueline Hathaway	Aitchison; Antonoff; Daniel	3:17
2.	"Burial"	Aitchison; Antonoff; Daniel; Hathaway	Aitchison; Antonoff; Daniel	3:09
3.	"My Mouth Is Lonely For You"	Tahliah Debrett Barnett; Jeffrey Nath Bhasker; Tobias Jesso Jr.; John Michael Rouchell; Lewis John Aelwyn Roberts; Matteo Chiarenza Santini	Barnett; Bhasker; Jesso; Rouchell; Roberts; Santini	4:04
4.	"Holy Spirit 2"	Aaron Boudreaux; Claire Givens; Hathaway; David Lowery	Antonoff; Rouchell; Andersson	3:50
5.	"Dark Cradle"	Aitchison; Antonoff; Patrik Berger	Aitchison; Antonoff; Berger	3:49
6.	"Blue Flame"	Aitchison; Antonoff; Daniel; Mark Anthony Spears	Aitchison; Antonoff; Berger; Daniel; Spears	3:29
7.	"Cut Ties"	Aitchison; Antonoff; Berger; Daniel; Hathaway	Aitchison; Antonoff; Berger	4:09
Total length:				25:51

== Reception ==
Craig McLean of Blend Journal wrote: "Overall, Hathaway – the Hollywood A-lister who channelled Oscar-winning tears as tragic Fantine in Les Misérables – again proves she has serious vocal abilities. She dreamed a dream… and so what if, for the character of Mother Mary, it turned out to be a bit of a nightmare? With this bespoke, bejewelled, bijou soundtrack, it was worth it." Jesse Roth of Staged Haze wrote "Ultimately, this is a rare kind of soundtrack that doesn't just support a movie, it expands it. It's camp, it's high drama, and it's meticulously crafted pop with just enough weirdness to keep it interesting. If this is what "greatest hits" sounds like in the world of Mother Mary, consider me fully converted."

== Charts ==
Chart (2026)	Peak position
UK Album Downloads (OCC)	57

== Mother Mary (Original Score) ==
Mother Mary (Original Score)

Film score by Daniel Hart
- Released: April 24, 2026
- Genre: Film score
- Length: 41:06
- Label: A24 Music
- Producer: Daniel Hart

Daniel Hart chronology
Peter Pan & Wendy (2023)	Mother Mary (Original Score) (2026)	Company (2026)

Mother Mary (Original Score) is the score album composed by Daniel Hart, a frequent collaborator of Lowery, who joined the project in May 2023. The album was released through A24 Music on April 24, 2026.

Track listing
No.	Title	Length
1.	"Something Beautiful That I'd Once Been a Part Of"	2:26
2.	"Red Like a Feeling"	3:01
3.	"I Stopped Listening to Your Music" (Daniel Hart & Bobak Lotfipour)	3:08
4.	"What Does It Do to You?"	2:03
5.	"The Walls Here Are Very Thin" (Daniel Hart & Jina Hyojin An)	2:02
6.	"I've Been Looking for You" (Daniel Hart & Bobak Lotfipour)	5:14
7.	"A Cloud or a Stone"	2:11
8.	"She Opened a Door" (Daniel Hart & Bobak Lotfipour)	7:08
9.	"The Day of Our Pentecost" (Jina Hyojin An)	3:48
10.	"The Rungs of Your Ladder"	4:15
11.	"The Greatest Song"	5:50
Total length:		41:06
