= Peter Pan & Wendy (soundtrack) =

Peter Pan & Wendy (Original Score)

Film score by Daniel Hart
- Released: April 28, 2023
- Recorded: 2021–2023
- Genre: Film score
- Length: 49:48
- Label: Walt Disney
- Producer: Daniel Hart

Daniel Hart chronology
Interview with the Vampire (2022)	Peter Pan & Wendy (2023)	Mother Mary (2026)

Peter Pan & Wendy (Original Score) is the soundtrack to the 2023 film of the same name; a live-action adaptation of Walt Disney's 1953 animated film Peter Pan, in turn based on the 1904 play Peter Pan; or, the Boy Who Wouldn't Grow Up (also known as Peter Pan) by J. M. Barrie, the film is directed by David Lowery and featured musical score composed by Daniel Hart, a recurrent collaborator in Lowery's films. The soundtrack was released by Walt Disney Records on April 28, 2023.

== Production and release ==
The film marked Hart's sixth collaboration with Lowery, since his debut with Ain't Them Bodies Saints (2013). He had worked on the score, without having a temp music accompanying the film and written minor cues of the film during February–April 2021, until he set aside working on the film, due to his commitments on scoring the documentary Fauci.

By August, he started writing the film's music and also had turned down various projects to set focus on Peter Pan & Wendy as two hours of music had to be written, which consisted of huge orchestra and choir. The orchestral recording happened in March 2022, while Hart also worked on the music for the AMC television series Interview with the Vampire.

Lowery wanted the score to be in communion with the history of European music and early 20th-century classical music, while wanting to have the "sense of legacy to the music in the same way the story has a tremendous legacy of its own". Hart admitted that the music is not new for the film, but felt true to the story and the time in which the film was set. The original soundtrack featuring Hart's score and three original songs, were released by Walt Disney Records on the same date as the film, April 28, 2023.

== Reception ==
Music critic Jonathan Broxton wrote "It must be hard, trying to come up with something new for a Peter Pan film, when composers like John Williams, Oliver Wallace, James Newton Howard, and John Powell, not to mention Dan Romer, Maurizio Malagnini, and Joel McNeely, have already plumbed these depths and come up with excellent music that stands the test of time. However, despite all this impressive precedent, the music that Daniel Hart has produced for Peter Pan & Wendy is outstanding. The multiplicity of themes, the cleverness of their interplay, the rousing action style, the fun swashbuckling sound, and the emotional layers, all make for a deeply impressive score which fans of children's fantasy music are sure to embrace."

Nikki Baughan of Screen International commented "The score, by longtime Lowery collaborator Daniel Hart, is unashamedly — and, at times, somewhat overwhelmingly — sweeping". Siddhant Adlakha of Polygon complimented that the "jingling notes" of Hart's score "evokes John Williams’ themes for Chris Columbus childhood classics like Home Alone and the first Harry Potter." Lovia Gyarkye of The Hollywood Reporter wrote "Daniel Hart's airy scores adds a playful and buoyant touch". Nick Schager of The Daily Beast felt that the score "temporarily apes John Williams’ Jurassic Park theme". Rachel Lebante of Screen Rant felt that "the score from Daniel Hart makes up for some of the missing magic, particularly in the cleverly-rendered sequence when the Darlings first pass into Neverland".

== Track listing ==
No.	Title	Length
1.	"The Darling Darlings"	2:47
2.	"My Shadow"	2:53
3.	"All Grown Up" (Molly Parker)	1:11
4.	"Neverland"	2:42
5.	"Never Say His Name"	1:21
6.	"Tea Time"	2:08
7.	"No Clocks"	2:52
8.	"Behemooth" (Ian Tracey)	1:34
9.	"It's Not Half Bad Being a Pirate"	1:20
10.	"Peter Pan Shall Perish Today"	1:43
11.	"Where You Go from Here Is Up to You"	2:43
12.	"The Very First Lost Boy"	2:53
13.	"The Shadow Run"	1:04
14.	"The Brig"	2:01
15.	"Ode to the Falling" (Ian Tracey)	2:08
16.	"Did Anyone Hear a Splash?"	0:49
17.	"Faith, Trust and Pixie Dust"	6:48
18.	"Straight on 'Til Chaos"	2:32
19.	"Reckoning"	2:32
20.	"Straight on 'Til Morning"	2:12
21.	"Goodbye Peter Pan"	3:35
Total length:		49:48
