= The Green Knight (soundtrack) =

The Green Knight (Original Motion Picture Soundtrack)

Film score by Daniel Hart
- Released: July 30, 2021
- Recorded: 2018–2021
- Genre: Film score
- Length: 69:43
- Label: Milan
- Producer: Daniel Hart

Daniel Hart chronology
The Last Letter from Your Lover (2021)	The Green Knight (Original Motion Picture Soundtrack) (2021)	Interview with the Vampire (Original Television Series Soundtrack) (2022)

The Green Knight (Original Motion Picture Soundtrack) is the score album composed by Daniel Hart to the 2021 film of the same name released by Milan Records on July 30, 2021. The film, directed, written, edited, and produced by David Lowery, adapted from the 14th-century poem Sir Gawain and the Green Knight, stars Dev Patel, Alicia Vikander, Joel Edgerton, Sarita Choudhury, Sean Harris, and Ralph Ineson.

Hart extensively researched medieval and 15th-century English and European music to be able to reflect the period in which the film was set. While predominantly using period instruments, the score integrates synth music at certain intervals to create an eerie atmosphere. Recorded during August 2019 and March 2020, the film's score went through multiple re-revisions as Lowery had to re-edit the initial cut which he was unsatisfied with, pushing back the scoring process to early-2021. The score received positive reviews from critics.

== Development ==
Lowery recruited composer Daniel Hart, who had been his collaborator ever since the 2013 film Ain't Them Bodies Saints. Hart felt the score was challenging, as the film was set in the 15th century, and he did not have a knowledge of medieval music; although he grew up singing liturgical music in the church choirs, most of it was rooted in ancient English music. He extensively researched into medieval English poetry, which served as the source of most of the lyrics he wrote for the film, authenticating the musical style of the story.

The scoring was a long process, beginning in August 2019 when Hart wrote the first song for the film. Since Lowery was still editing during that time and the film was not complete, Hart had to compose the score in separate sections, with the first being the middle section "A Meeting With St. Winfred". He could not get the timing right as the rhythm of the score was not quite the way he had expected and had to experiment those themes. While most of the score had been recorded prior to the COVID-19 pandemic, the film's postponement from its initial March 2020 date led Lowery to re-edit the film after he was unsatisfied with the initial cut which was intended to premiere at the South by Southwest festival, which led to multiple revisions in the score.

Hart used a quartet of recorders as they were the main instrument of European music in the 15th century, eventually fitting in the context of the film's musical palette. Most of the demos he had written had consisted of recorder quartets and he and Lowery discussed using specific instruments for the film, mostly period instruments. However, there are sequences where he had to use synthesizers allowing the creative freedom to explore and experiment the themes. After listening to Mark Korven's score for The Witch (2015), he wanted to use two main instruments, which were the nyckelharpa and the Apprehension Engine which was built by luthier Tony Duggan-Smith for Korven. He further used a seven-member choir performing sopranos and altos, and also played violins and violas which were augmented by a six-member cello.

Gawain's theme started with "a very playful, slightly off-kilter melody that reprises several times in the first section of the film" but disappears after his departure to his adventure-filled quest and grows up over the coming months. Hart also wrote themes for Gawain’s love interest Essel (Alicia Vikander), King Arthur (Sean Harris), and the sword Excalibur. He also added the sounds of Prophet Rev 2 synthesizer to replicate the mood and ambience of Wendy Carlos' music for The Shining (1980).

== Track listing ==
No.	Title	Artist(s)	Length
1.	"In Stori Stif And Stronge"		2:01
2.	"Christ Is Born Indeed"		1:28
3.	"You Do Smell Like You've Been At Mass All Night"		2:33
4.	"Tell Me A Tale Of Yourself, So That I Might Know Thee"		2:49
5.	"Shaped By Your Hands"		2:01
6.	"O Greatest Of Kings"		2:56
7.	"Remember It Is Only A Game"		2:27
8.	"One Year Hence"		3:00
9.	"I Promise You Will Not Come To Harm"		3:14
10.	"Child Thou Ert A Pilgrim"		2:17
11.	"Rest Them Bones My Brave Little Knight"		3:13
12.	"A Meeting With St. Winifred"		1:07
13.	"Your Head Is On Your Neck, My Lady"		1:59
14.	"Are You Real, Or Are You A Spirit?"		1:19
15.	"I Will Strike Thee Down With Every Care That I Have For Thee"		1:33
16.	"Aiganz O Kulzphazur"	Emma Tring	2:30
17.	"The Giant's Call"		2:57
18.	"Brave Sir Gawain Come To Face The Green Knight"		1:57
19.	"Should Not A Knight Offer A Lady A Kiss In Thanks?"		1:03
20.	"Hold Very Still"		2:30
21.	"Do You Believe In Witchcraft?"		3:06
22.	"You Are No Knight"		1:22
23.	"I Never Asked For Your Help Anyway"		2:47
24.	"Gawain Runs And Runs"	Katenka Vindelev; Bobak Loftipour	1:40
25.	"Blome Swete Lilie Flour"		3:07
26.	"Excalibur"		1:54
27.	"O Nyghtegale"	Atheena Frizzell	5:23
28.	"Now I'm Ready, I'm Ready Now"		4:01
29.	"Be Merry, Swete Lorde"	Katenka Vindelev	1:29
Total length:			69:43

== Reception ==
Music critic Jonathan Broxton wrote that "The Green Knight is not an easy score to get into. Its unusual combination of English folk music, religious plainsong, medieval orchestrations, modern string textures, and aggressively dissonant electronica sounds like a recipe for disaster, but in Daniel Hart’s hands the music becomes a perfect representation of Gawain’s world, where the solid and the real blends seamlessly with the magical and the supernatural in a way which the people of that time completely accept." Mark Kermode of The Guardian called the score "rich and dramatic", and a critic from Scroll.in complimented it as "richly tense". A. O. Scott from The New York Times called the score "metal-acquainted".

Tim Grierson of Screen International wrote that "Daniel Hart’s score evokes dread and wonder in equal measure, adding to the sense that the picture is set in a mythical land removed from our reality." John Nugent of Empire wrote "Daniel Hart's enigmatic score, mixing traditional folk music with the occasional oppressive synth, affirms the mysterious mood." David Rooney of The Hollywood Reporter praised the musical score and sound design, writing "the enveloping soundscape created by Johnny Marshall, full of the eerie noise of nature, works hand in hand with the dense, turbulent beauty of Daniel Hart’s score and its period-appropriate choral passages." Justin Chang of Los Angeles Times wrote "Speaking of music: These fateful encounters draw lyricism and gravity from the singsong interludes and delicately plucked strings of Daniel Hart’s enveloping, ever-present score."

Dana Stevens of Slate called the score "eerie and roughly period-appropriate", and Keith Watson of Slant Magazine complimented it as "nearly omnipresent". Clint Worthington of Consequence wrote "The score, a haunting mix of clattering tones and ancient song courtesy of longtime Lowery collaborator Daniel Hart, fills the air with the sense that this world is bigger and more mysterious than we can possibly ken."

== Accolades ==
Award	Date of ceremony	Category	Recipient(s)	Result	Ref.
Austin Film Critics Association	January 11, 2022	Best Original Score	Daniel Hart	Nominated	
Hollywood Music in Media Awards	November 17, 2021	Original Score — Independent Film	Daniel Hart	Nominated	
International Film Music Critics Association	February 17, 2022	Film Score of the Year	Daniel Hart	Nominated	
International Film Music Critics Association	February 17, 2022	Best Original Score for a Fantasy/Science Fiction/Horror Film	Daniel Hart	Nominated	
San Francisco Bay Area Film Critics Circle	January 10, 2022	Best Original Score	Daniel Hart	Nominated	
Society of Composers & Lyricists	March 8, 2022	Outstanding Original Score for an Independent Film	Daniel Hart	Won	
World Soundtrack Awards	March 17, 2022	Film Composer of the Year	Daniel Hart	Nominated	
World Soundtrack Awards	March 17, 2022	Best Original Song Written Directly for a Film	Daniel Hart	Won	
