= Interview with the Vampire (Original Television Series Soundtrack) =

Soundtrack album by Daniel Hart
- Released: October 21, 2022
- Recorded: 2022
- Studios: Synchron Stage, Austria; The Human Project, US; AIR and RAK, UK
- Genres: Soundtrack; classical; orchestral
- Length: 53:57
- Label: Milan
- Producer: Daniel Hart

Daniel Hart chronology
The Green Knight (Original Motion Picture Soundtrack) (2021)	Interview with the Vampire (Original Television Series Soundtrack) (2022)	Peter Pan & Wendy (Original Score) (2023)

External videos
- The Synchron Orchestra's performances of the score
- Daniel Hart: Interview With The Vampire - "The Drum Was My Heart"
- Daniel Hart: Interview With The Vampire . "Claudia"
- Vicious by Daniel Hart, feat. Damir Orascanin

Interview with the Vampire (Original Television Series Soundtrack) contains music from the first season of the AMC gothic horror series of the same name. The series is an adaptation of Anne Rice's eponymous 1976 novel. Daniel Hart composed and produced the soundtrack, which has 19 tracks. Milan Records released the album for digital distribution on October 21, 2022, and it was released on compact disc (CD) in March 3, 2023. Critics praised the soundtrack, which was nominated for Best Original Score for Television at the International Film Music Critics Association Awards (IFMCA).

== Background and release ==
In 2021, Rolin Jones was appointed as creator, writer, and showrunner of the AMC television series Interview with the Vampire after AMC acquired the rights to Anne Rice's 18-book series The Vampire Chronicles and Lives of the Mayfair Witches. Jones pitched the show as a "gothic love story" to his former The Exorcist collaborator Daniel Hart, whom Jones asked to score it. Hart described Jones as "one of the best people to work for". Hart immediately accepted the request, appreciating Jones's interest in classical music, particularly modern experimental and contemporary classical music.

The first track, "Overture", was uploaded to the series' official Twitter account on October 1, 2022, a day before its premiere. Milan Records released the soundtrack album for streaming and digital download twenty days later, and it was released on compact disc (CD) on March 3, 2023.

== Conception and recording ==
Hart and Jones centered the score's style on the period in which the show's protagonists live, intending to reflect African-American contributions to the New Orleans music scene. They discussed early 20th-century American classical musicians, including Florence Price, Aaron Copland, William Grant Still, Louis Armstrong, and Duke Ellington, as well as Trent Reznor's and Atticus Ross's score for the 2020 film Mank. Following a discussion with Sam Reid about the importance of his character's singing, Jones asked Hart to compose a song for Lestat de Lioncourt, Reid's character. Hart said he avoided pressuring himself by choosing not to re-watch the 1994 film adaptation or listen to its score.

Starting in March 2022, while he was recording the orchestral score for Peter Pan & Wendy (2023), Hart began working on the score for Interview with the Vampire. He began before filming took place by writing the show's diegetic music, and he composed the non-diegetic music while watching the completed scenes. Most of the music was performed in Vienna by the 49-piece orchestra of Synchron Stage; as well as studios in London and Los Angeles, with Hart remotely attended recording session because composing for the rest of the season was concurrent. Hart composed the non-orchestral portion of the score at his home studio in Los Angeles; he was aided by a small chamber ensemble composed of Hart and his friends.

Hart credited his background in playwriting, classical training, and experience scoring The Green Knight (2021) with helping him write character-driven music for the show. He composed a theme for each of the three main characters, based on the tone of their voices, so the music would be a part of their internal monologues. For Louis de Pointe du Lac's theme, Hart focused on his moral struggle and melancholy temperament, mixing strings and wind instruments with piano melodies connecting him to his siblings. Claudia's theme is rich with flowing, elegant, swaying melodies that are also dominated by strings and wind instruments. Due to the character's origins in the Old World, Hart wrote Lestat's theme in a traditional classical manner and accompanied it with brass instruments to underline his violence. For the character Nicolas de Lenfent, Lestat's former lover and a violinist, a violin is heard upon each appearance or mention.

== Composition ==
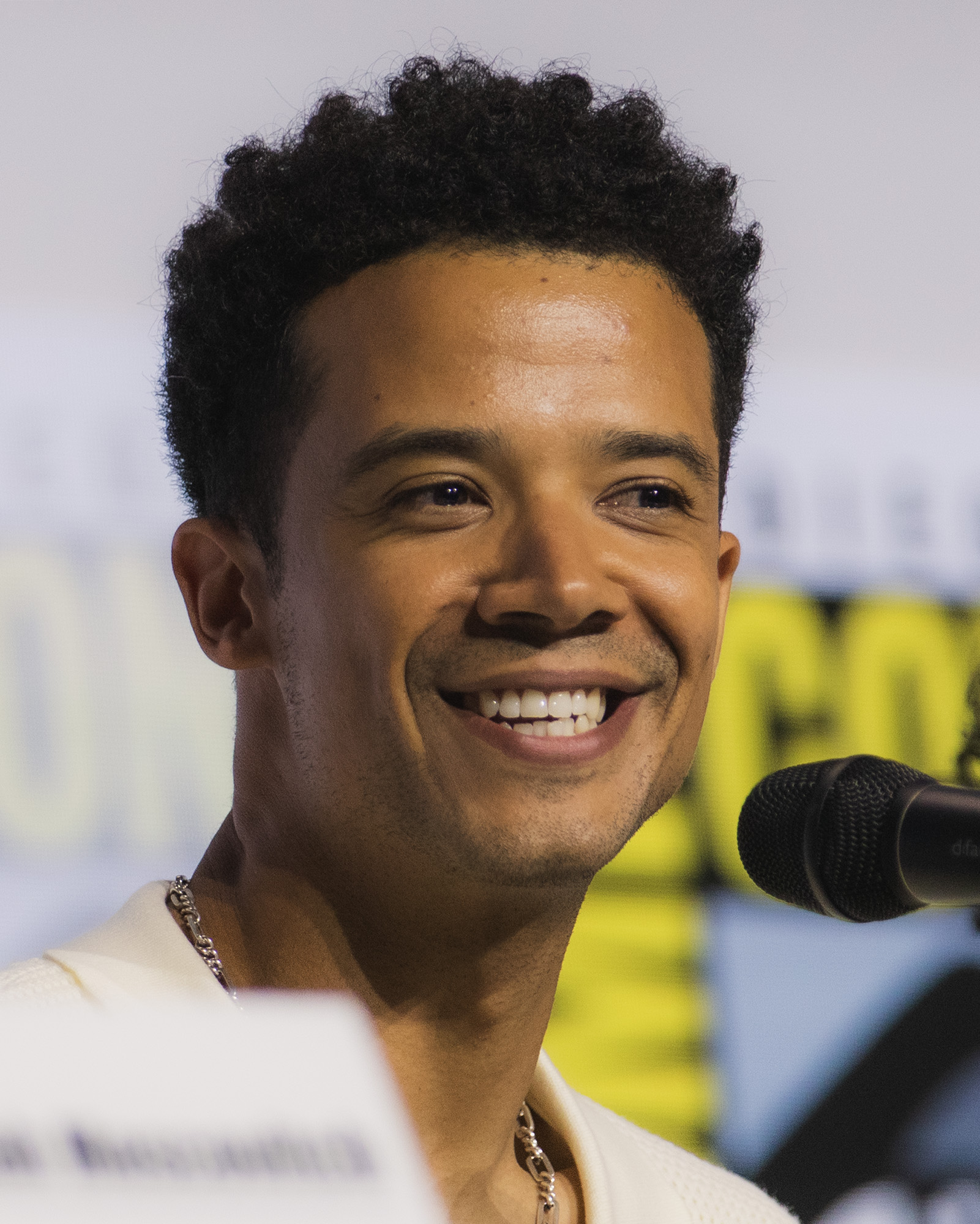
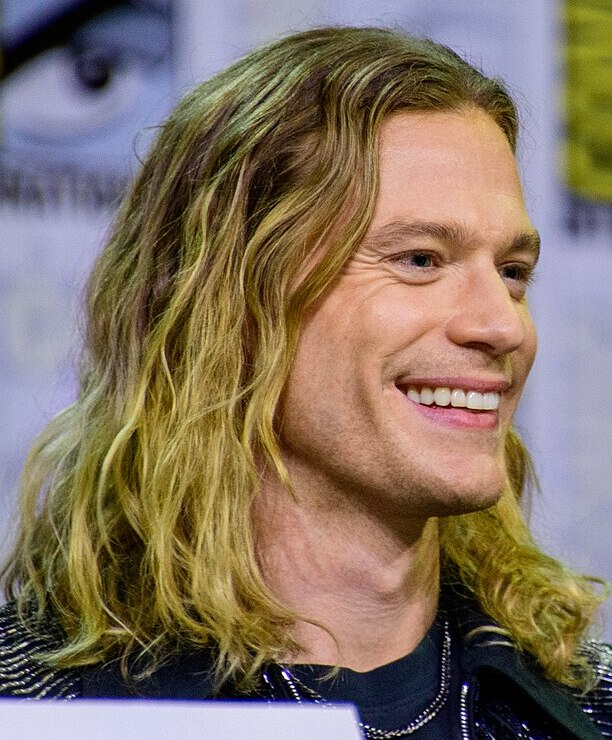
The chemistry between Jacob Anderson and Sam Reid during their first-kiss scene inspired Hart when composing "In Throes of Increasing Wonder".

Interview with the Vampire (Original Television Series Soundtrack) contains 19 tracks; it opens with "Overture", which Jones likened to overtures from early films and musicals. Due to time constraints, in the track, Hart introduced only the score's three major themes; "The Drum Was My Heart," "Come to Me," and "In Throes of Increasing Wonder". The second track, "Interview with the Orchestra", accompanies the series' opening title and sounds like an orchestra warming up. It is followed by "The World is a Savage Garden"—a gloomy piece—and "Viens A Moi". "Viens A Moi" features an ostinato violin-and-cello melody. "Permanent Exile" is a horror composition that is influenced by Wojciech Kilar's work in Bram Stoker's Dracula (1992), with a lot of extended technique, notably on the brass. The sixth track, "The Drum Was My Heart", accompanies Louis's transformation into a vampire. Hart considered "In Throes of Increasing Wonder" as Louis's and Lestat's "love theme"; he was inspired by the chemistry between Jacob Anderson and Sam Reid during their first-kiss scene. Hart and Shruti Kumar composed "The Sun Gives Life to Everything But Us", while "My Very Nature That of the Devil" is an "expressive" solo violin-and-piano duet. "The Fantasy of Happiness" opens with bars of a music box tune that leads into a string-dominated composition.

"Vicious", the soundtrack's longest track, and "Claudia" and "For a Young Violinist", are Hart's favorites. "Vicious" features a violin solo performed by Synchron Stage's concertmaster Damir Oraščanin. According to Hart, the track's nearly-six-minute duration allowed him to "really develop something and expand it", and he felt he had "unlocked something related to the show and to the characters". "Are We the Sum of Our Worst Moments" is a "playful" piano-and-celesta piece that is supported by light strings and woodwind, while "Come to Me" is written for Louis from Lestat's point of view and includes a vocal performance from Sam Reid. "For a Young Violinist," a second music box melody used as diegetic music in the series, closes the soundtrack.

== Reception ==
Critics praised the soundtrack, describing it as "operatic", "swooning", "haunting", "elegant, ominous", "absolutely gorgeous", and "something out of Old Hollywood". Comparing it with Elliot Goldenthal's score for the 1994 film adaptation, IFMCA critic Jonathan Broxton said Hart followed Goldenthal's strategy of turning the score into a celebration of "classical opulence" while not avoiding the bleak, brutal side of the story, occasionally engaging in "some harsh and challenging dissonances". Broxton later described the score as "outstanding" and named it one of the best television scores of 2022. He said Hart had presented a "fresh and invigorating" spin by demonstrating his talent for commanding a huge orchestra and writing appropriately thematic material.

IndieWire's Steve Greene named Interview with the Vampire (Original Television Series Soundtrack) the eighth-best television score of 2022, saying Hart provided "tragedy and romance" and could "tiptoe his way between something full and fierce and a haunting music-box feel". Ben Bishop of Comic Book Resources called the music in the series "an essential character" due to the skill with which the series manages its diegetic and incidental music, the music is as significant to the characters as it is to viewers. He stated the series uses music "to create a story just as informed by music as the culture it shows on-screen". Tony Sokol of Den of Geek wrote the score is "exciting enough to move transitioning street thug Louis to perform a soft-shoe duet, and classically-trained musician Lestat to put a boogie-woogie rhythm to a Bach figured bass".

== Additional music ==
The television series Interview with the Vampire also includes "Home Is Where You're Happy", which was written by American criminal and musician Charles Manson, and appears the end of the episode "A Vile Hunger for Your Hammering Heart". Vulture included the song in its list of the top-ten uses of existing pop music on television in 2022.

== Track listing ==
All tracks are written by Daniel Hart.

Interview with the Vampire (Original Television Series Soundtrack) track listing
No.	Title	Key scenes/Notes	Length
1.	"Overture"	Contains the score's three notable themes	1:23
2.	"Interview with the Orchestra"	Used in the opening sequence. Sound of an orchestra warming up	0:27
3.	"The World Is a Savage Garden"	"In Throes of Increasing Wonder...": As Louis and Lestat walk to Lestat's townhouse after the dinner with Louis's family	1:33
4.	"Viens a moi"	"In Throes of Increasing Wonder...": Lestat ambushes Paul's funeral and telepathically calls out to Louis.	4:35
5.	"Permanent Exile"	"In Throes of Increasing Wonder...": As Lestat attacks the priests at the church where Louis is confessing his sins	3:15
6.	"The Drum Was My Heart"	"In Throes of Increasing Wonder...": Lestat turns Louis into a vampire.	2:40
7.	"In Throes of Increasing Wonder"	Used in the end credits, except episodes "A Vile Hunger for Your Hammering Heart", "Like Angels Put in Hell by God", and "The Thing Lay Still"	2:12
8.	"The Sun Gives Life to Everything but Us" (with Shruti Kumar)	"...After the Phantoms of Your Former Self": Lestat leads a partially burned Louis into his coffin room.	1:32
9.	"My Very Nature That of the Devil"	"Is My Very Nature That of a Devil": Louis talks about his nature as the situation with Azalea in the flashback gets worse.	2:14
10.	"Claudia"	"Is My Very Nature That of a Devil": Louis walks down the streets of Storyville and saves Claudia from a burning house.	2:07
11.	"Charlie"	"...The Ruthless Pursuit of Blood with All a Child's Demanding": As Claudia and Charlie are being intimate	3:18
12.	"The Fantasy of Happiness"	"...The Ruthless Pursuit of Blood with All a Child's Demanding": Louis talks about Claudia as his daughter, and Claudia breaks down in the flashback.	4:05
13.	"Vicious" (featuring Damir Oraščanin)	"A Vile Hunger for Your Hammering Heart": Lestat goes violent on Louis and drops him from the sky.	5:40
14.	"Are We the Sum of Our Worst Moments"	"Like Angels Put in Hell by God": As Louis recovers from his wounds and Lestat tries to make contact with him	5:26
15.	"Come to Me" (featuring Sam Reid)	"Like Angels Put in Hell by God": The song Rashid plays in Dubai per Louis's request. Used in the end credits of the episode	2:37
16.	"Hey Sis You Don't Need Me"	"Like Angels Put in Hell by God": Louis says goodbye to Claudia.	2:06
17.	"To Beat Lestat You Have to Become Lestat"	"Like Angels Put in Hell by God": Claudia plays a game of chess against Lestat and decides to kill him.	3:16
18.	"Laudanum and Arsenic"	"The Thing Lay Still": As Lestat reveals Antoinette's role to Louis and Claudia	3:09
19.	"For a Young Violinist"	The music box Lestat composed for his past lover, Nicolas. "In Throes of Increasing Wonder...": Louis's sits in Lestat's townhouse with Lestat and Miss Lily. "Like Angels Put in Hell by God": Claudia taunts Lestat about Nicolas.	2:22
Total length:			53:57

== Credits and personnel ==
Credits are adapted from the soundtrack's liner notes.

Production

- Daniel Hart – producer
- JC Chamboredon – executive producer
- Stefan Karrer – executive producer
- Pablo Manyer – production manager

Management and design

- Bridget Samuels – contractor (track 14–16, 18)
- Pari Dukovic – photography
- Shawn Lyon – graphic design and layout

Instrumentation and vocal

- Bobak Lotfipour – additional percussion
- Evan Smith – clarinet (track 3)
- Sam Reid – vocals (track 15)

Orchestration

- The Synchron Orchestra – orchestra (track 1, 2, 5–7, 10–13)
- Orchestrate – orchestra (track 14–16, 18)
- Bernhard Voss – conductor (track 1, 2, 5–7, 10–13)
- Evan Jolly – conductor (track 14–16, 18)
- Mark Wlodarkiewicz – score preparation
- Shruti Kumar – score preparation
- Jina Hyojin An – score preparation
- Shirley Song – score preparation

Technical

- Danny Reisch – mixing
- John Mitchael Caldwell – additional mixing
- Rob Kleiner – mastering
- Bernd Mazagg – engineering (track 1, 2, 5–7, 10–13)
- Jeremy Murphy – engineering (track 14–16, 18)
- Mark Wlodarkiewicz – music editing

Location

- Synchron Stage, Vienna – recording (track 1, 2, 5–7, 10–13)
- The Human Project Studio, Los Angeles – recording (track 3, 4, 8, 9, 17, 19)
- AIR Studios and RAK Studios, London – recording (track 14–16, 18)
- Electric Ear Studio, Los Angeles – mixing

== Awards and nominations ==
Awards and nominations received by Interview with the Vampire (Original Television Series Soundtrack)
Award	Year (Note: The listed year refers to the date of the ceremony.)	Category	Result	Ref.
International Film Music Critics Association Awards	2023	Best Original Score for Television	Nominated	

== Release history ==
Release dates and formats for Interview with the Vampire (Original Television Series Soundtrack)
Region	Date	Label	Format	Catalog	Ref.
Worldwide	October 21, 2022	Milan Records	Download; streaming	G0100049019645	
United States	March 3, 2023	Milan Records	CD	19658791662	

== See also ==
- Soundtrack of the 1994 Interview with the Vampire film
