= 2023 Four Continents Figure Skating Championships =

- Type: ISU Championship
- Date: February 7 – 12
- Season: 2022–23
- Location: Colorado Springs, Colorado, United States
- Host: U.S. Figure Skating
- Venue: Broadmoor World Arena

Champions
- Men's singles: (Japan) Kao Miura
- Women's singles: (South Korea) Lee Hae-in
- Pairs: (Japan) Riku Miura / Ryuichi Kihara
- Ice dance: (United States) Madison Chock / Evan Bates
- Previous: 2022 Four Continents Championships
- Next: 2024 Four Continents Championships

The 2023 Four Continents Figure Skating Championships were held from February 7–12, 2023, at the Broadmoor World Arena in Colorado Springs, Colorado, in the United States. Held annually since 1999 (except for 2021 due to the COVID-19 pandemic), the competition featured skaters from the Americas, Asia, Africa, and Oceania. Medals were awarded in men's singles, women's singles, pair skating, and ice dance. Nations from non-European countries could send three entries at most for every discipline.

== Qualification ==
=== Age and minimum TES requirements ===
The competition was open to skaters from all non-European member nations of the International Skating Union. The corresponding competition for European skaters was the 2023 European Championships.

Skaters were eligible for the 2023 Four Continents Championships if they turned 15 years of age before July 1, 2022, and met the minimum technical elements score requirements. The ISU accepts scores if they were obtained at senior-level ISU-recognized international competitions during the ongoing season at least 21 days before the first official practice day of the championships or during the preceding season.

Discipline	SP / RD	FS / FD
Men	28	46
Women	25	42
Pairs	25	42
Ice dance	28	45

- SP/RD and FS/FD scores may be attained at different events.

=== Number of entries per discipline ===
Each qualifying ISU member nation could enter up to three skaters or teams per discipline.

== Entries ==
Member nations began announcing their selections in December 2022. The International Skating Union published a complete list of entries on January 18, 2023.

Country	Men	Women	Pairs	Ice dance
Australia	Darian Kaptich	Vlada Vasiliev	—N/a	Holly Harris / Jason Chan
Australia	—N/a		—N/a	India Nette / Eron Westwood
Canada	Stephen Gogolev	Sara-Maude Dupuis	Kelly Ann Laurin / Loucas Éthier	Laurence Fournier Beaudry / Nikolaj Sørensen
Canada	Keegan Messing	Justine Miclette	Lia Pereira / Trennt Michaud	Marjorie Lajoie / Zachary Lagha
Canada	Conrad Orzel	Madeline Schizas	Deanna Stellato-Dudek / Maxime Deschamps	Marie-Jade Lauriault / Romain Le Gac
China	Chen Yudong	—N/a	Wang Huidi / Jia Ziqi	Wang Shiyue / Liu Xinyu
China	Jin Boyang	—N/a	Zhang Siyang / Yang Yongchao	—N/a
Chinese Taipei	—N/a	Ting Tzu-Han	—N/a	
Hong Kong	Yuen Lap Kan	Cheung Cheuk Ka Kahlen	—N/a	
Hong Kong	—N/a	Chow Hiu Yau	—N/a	
Hong Kong	—N/a	Joanna So	—N/a	
India	—N/a	Tara Prasad	—N/a	
Japan	Kao Miura	Mone Chiba	Riku Miura / Ryuichi Kihara	Misato Komatsubara / Tim Koleto
Japan	Shun Sato	Rinka Watanabe	—N/a	Kana Muramoto / Daisuke Takahashi
Japan	Koshiro Shimada	Hana Yoshida	—N/a	—N/a
Kazakhstan	Rakhat Bralin	Sofiya Farafonova	—N/a	Gaukhar Nauryzova / Boyisangur Datiev
Kazakhstan	Dias Jirenbayev	Anna Levkovets	—N/a	—N/a
Kazakhstan	Mikhail Shaidorov	Bagdana Rakhishova	—N/a	—N/a
New Zealand	Douglas Gerber	Jocelyn Hong	—N/a	Charlotte Lafond-Fournier / Richard Kang In Kam
Philippines	Edrian Paul Celestino	Sofia Lexi Jacqueline Frank	Isabella Gamez / Alexander Korovin	—N/a
Singapore	Pagiel Yie Ken Sng	—N/a		
South Korea	Cha Jun-hwan	Kim Chae-yeon	—N/a	
South Korea	Kyeong Jae-seok	Kim Ye-lim	—N/a	
South Korea	Lee Si-hyeong	Lee Hae-in	—N/a	
United States	Liam Kapeikis	Amber Glenn	Emily Chan / Spencer Akira Howe	Christina Carreira / Anthony Ponomarenko
United States	Jimmy Ma	Isabeau Levito	Ellie Kam / Danny O'Shea	Madison Chock / Evan Bates
United States	Maxim Naumov	Bradie Tennell	Valentina Plazas / Maximiliano Fernandez	Caroline Green / Michael Parsons

=== Changes to preliminary assignments ===
Date	Discipline	Withdrew	Added	Notes	Ref.
January 31	Ice dance	(Canada) Piper Gilles / Paul Poirier	(Canada) Marie-Jade Lauriault / Romain Le Gac	Surgery (Gilles)	
February 1	Pairs	(Australia) Anastasia Golubeva / Hektor Giotopoulos Moore	—N/a		
February 3	Ice dance	(China) Chen Xizi / Xing Jianing	—N/a	Visa issues	
February 3	Ice dance	(China) Li Xuantong / Wang Xinkang	—N/a	Visa issues	
February 6	Women	(Mexico) Eugenia Garza	—N/a		

== Medal summary ==
=== Medalists ===
Medals awarded to the skaters who achieved the highest overall placements in each discipline:

Discipline	Gold	Silver	Bronze
Men	(Japan) Kao Miura	(Canada) Keegan Messing	(Japan) Shun Sato
Women	(South Korea) Lee Hae-in	(South Korea) Kim Ye-lim	(Japan) Mone Chiba
Pairs	(Japan) Riku Miura / Ryuichi Kihara	(United States) Emily Chan / Spencer Akira Howe	(Canada) Deanna Stellato-Dudek / Maxime Deschamps
Ice dance	(United States) Madison Chock / Evan Bates	(Canada) Laurence Fournier Beaudry / Nikolaj Sørensen	(Canada) Marjorie Lajoie / Zachary Lagha

Small medals awarded to the skaters who achieved the highest short program or rhythm dance placements in each discipline:

Discipline	Gold	Silver	Bronze
Men	(Japan) Kao Miura	(Canada) Keegan Messing	(United States) Jimmy Ma
Women	(South Korea) Kim Ye-lim	(United States) Isabeau Levito	(South Korea) Kim Chae-yeon
Pairs	(Japan) Riku Miura / Ryuichi Kihara	(Canada) Deanna Stellato-Dudek / Maxime Deschamps	(United States) Emily Chan / Spencer Akira Howe
Ice dance	(United States) Madison Chock / Evan Bates	(Canada) Laurence Fournier Beaudry / Nikolaj Sørensen	(Canada) Marjorie Lajoie / Zachary Lagha

Small medals awarded to the skaters who achieved the highest free skating or free dance placements in each discipline:

Discipline	Gold	Silver	Bronze
Men	(Japan) Kao Miura	(Canada) Keegan Messing	(Japan) Shun Sato
Women	(South Korea) Lee Hae-in	(Japan) Mone Chiba	(South Korea) Kim Ye-lim
Pairs	(Japan) Riku Miura / Ryuichi Kihara	(United States) Emily Chan / Spencer Akira Howe	(Canada) Deanna Stellato-Dudek / Maxime Deschamps
Ice dance	(United States) Madison Chock / Evan Bates	(Canada) Laurence Fournier Beaudry / Nikolaj Sorensen	(Canada) Marjorie Lajoie / Zachary Lagha

=== Medals by country ===
Table of medals for overall placement:

Rank	Nation	Gold	Silver	Bronze	Total
1	Japan	2	0	2	4
2	South Korea	1	1	0	2
2	United States	1	1	0	2
4	Canada	0	2	2	4
Totals (4 entries)		4	4	4	12

== Results ==
=== Men's singles ===
Rank	Skater	Nation	Total points	SP		FS	
1st place, gold medalist(s)	Kao Miura	Japan	281.53	1	91.90	1	189.63
2nd place, silver medalist(s)	Keegan Messing	Canada	275.57	2	86.70	2	188.87
3rd place, bronze medalist(s)	Shun Sato	Japan	259.14	6	80.81	3	178.33
4	Cha Jun-hwan	South Korea	250.14	5	83.77	4	166.37
5	Mikhail Shaidorov	Kazakhstan	237.14	12	72.43	5	164.71
6	Lee Si-hyeong	South Korea	227.79	14	70.38	6	157.41
7	Jin Boyang	China	227.47	4	85.32	10	142.15
8	Conrad Orzel	Canada	226.10	7	80.09	7	146.01
9	Jimmy Ma	United States	221.04	3	86.64	13	134.40
10	Maxim Naumov	United States	218.71	8	75.96	9	142.75
11	Koshiro Shimada	Japan	217.85	10	74.96	8	143.79
12	Kyeong Jae-seok	South Korea	211.98	9	75.30	12	136.68
13	Stephen Gogolev	Canada	209.76	11	72.82	11	136.94
14	Liam Kapeikis	United States	198.00	13	71.43	14	126.57
15	Chen Yudong	China	184.41	15	67.93	16	116.48
16	Dias Jirenbayev	Kazakhstan	183.42	18	57.67	15	125.75
17	Edrian Paul Celestino	Philippines	166.92	16	66.83	19	100.09
18	Darian Kaptich	Australia	166.13	17	58.22	17	107.91
19	Rakhat Bralin	Kazakhstan	160.20	19	54.25	18	105.95
20	Pagiel Yie Ken Sng	Singapore	138.83	20	48.52	20	90.31
21	Douglas Gerber	New Zealand	125.95	21	40.75	21	85.20
22	Lap Kan Yuen	Hong Kong	117.04	22	36.33	22	80.71

=== Women's singles ===
Rank	Skater	Nation	Total points	SP		FS	
1st place, gold medalist(s)	Lee Hae-in	South Korea	210.84	6	69.13	1	141.71
2nd place, silver medalist(s)	Kim Ye-lim	South Korea	209.29	1	72.84	3	136.45
3rd place, bronze medalist(s)	Mone Chiba	Japan	204.98	7	67.28	2	137.70
4	Kim Chae-yeon	South Korea	202.39	3	71.39	5	131.00
5	Rinka Watanabe	Japan	200.50	8	65.60	4	134.90
6	Bradie Tennell	United States	199.91	5	69.49	6	130.42
7	Amber Glenn	United States	192.50	4	69.63	8	122.87
8	Hana Yoshida	Japan	189.60	10	59.82	7	129.78
9	Sara-Maude Dupuis	Canada	170.67	12	51.68	9	118.99
10	Madeline Schizas	Canada	159.73	9	60.11	10	99.62
11	Justine Miclette	Canada	149.56	13	51.24	11	98.32
12	Jocelyn Hong	New Zealand	148.33	11	52.02	12	96.31
13	Ting Tzu-Han	Chinese Taipei	140.51	17	45.19	13	95.32
14	Tara Prasad	India	133.15	14	46.04	14	87.11
15	Joanna So	Hong Kong	132.99	15	45.90	15	87.09
16	Anna Levkovets	Kazakhstan	129.26	16	45.53	16	83.73
17	Sofiya Farafonova	Kazakhstan	126.48	18	44.66	17	81.82
18	Vlada Vasiliev	Australia	113.95	21	40.13	18	73.82
19	Cheung Cheuk Ka Kahlen	Hong Kong	104.38	22	39.58	19	64.80
20	Chow Hiu Yau	Hong Kong	100.16	20	42.10	21	58.06
21	Bagdana Rakhishova	Kazakhstan	95.58	23	35.96	20	59.62
WD	Isabeau Levito	United States	withdrew	2	71.50	withdrew from competition	
WD	Sofia Lexi Jacqueline Frank	Philippines	withdrew	19	43.82	withdrew from competition	

=== Pairs ===
Rank	Team	Nation	Total points	SP		FS	
1st place, gold medalist(s)	Riku Miura / Ryuichi Kihara	Japan	208.24	1	71.19	1	137.05
2nd place, silver medalist(s)	Emily Chan / Spencer Akira Howe	United States	201.11	3	66.96	2	134.15
3rd place, bronze medalist(s)	Deanna Stellato-Dudek / Maxime Deschamps	Canada	193.84	2	68.39	3	125.45
4	Lia Pereira / Trennt Michaud	Canada	186.33	4	65.16	4	121.17
5	Valentina Plazas / Maximiliano Fernandez	United States	169.09	5	60.07	6	109.02
6	Ellie Kam / Danny O'Shea	United States	168.69	7	57.49	5	111.20
7	Kelly Ann Laurin / Loucas Éthier	Canada	167.67	6	59.12	7	108.55
8	Zhang Siyang / Yang Yongchao	China	153.76	8	56.10	8	97.66
9	Isabella Gamez / Alexander Korovin	Philippines	113.48	10	39.69	9	73.79
WD	Wang Huidi / Jia Ziqi	China	withdrew	9	53.65	withdrew from competition	

=== Ice dance ===
Rank	Team	Nation	Total points	RD		FD	
1st place, gold medalist(s)	Madison Chock / Evan Bates	United States	220.81	1	87.67	1	133.14
2nd place, silver medalist(s)	Laurence Fournier Beaudry / Nikolaj Sørensen	Canada	214.08	2	86.28	2	127.80
3rd place, bronze medalist(s)	Marjorie Lajoie / Zachary Lagha	Canada	200.00	3	79.04	3	120.96
4	Christina Carreira / Anthony Ponomarenko	United States	189.78	4	76.97	5	112.81
5	Caroline Green / Michael Parsons	United States	186.88	5	69.99	4	116.89
6	Marie-Jade Lauriault / Romain Le Gac	Canada	171.35	8	62.03	6	109.32
7	Misato Komatsubara / Tim Koleto	Japan	165.71	6	66.72	8	98.99
8	Holly Harris / Jason Chan	Australia	162.69	9	60.72	7	101.98
9	Kana Muramoto / Daisuke Takahashi	Japan	160.24	7	64.59	9	95.65
10	Charlotte Lafond-Fournier / Richard Kang In Kam	New Zealand	144.19	10	53.79	10	90.40
11	India Nette / Eron Westwood	Australia	117.76	11	45.89	11	71.87
12	Gaukhar Nauryzova / Boyisangur Datiev	Kazakhstan	114.46	12	43.84	12	70.62
