= Dikki John Martinez =

Filipino figure skater (born 1991)

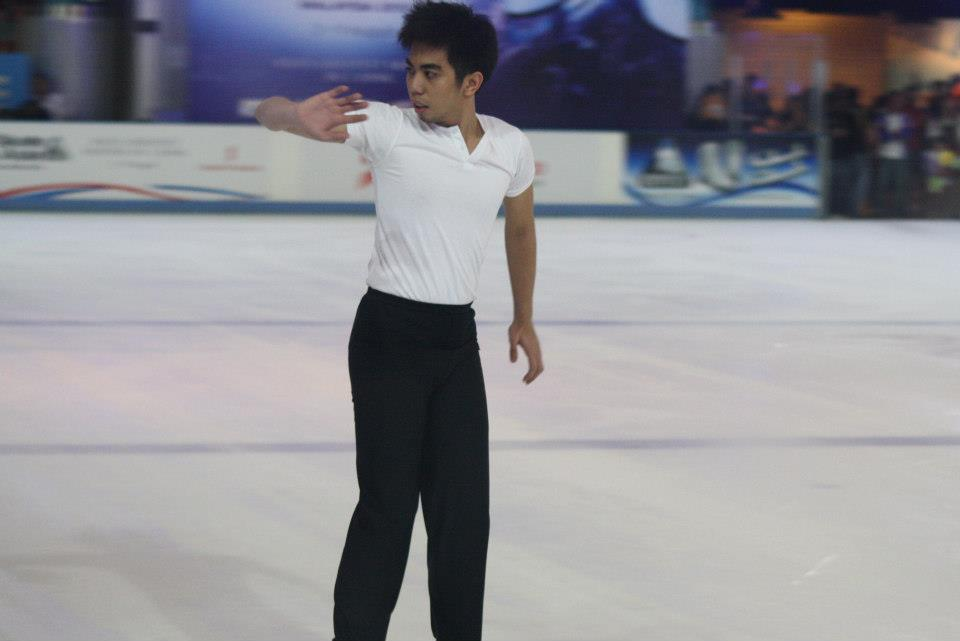

Personal information
- Full name: Dikki John Atienza Martinez
- Born: October 6, 1991 (age 34) Quezon City
- Height: 1.73 m (5 ft 8 in)

Figure skating career
- Country: Philippines
- Coach: Sherri Terando
- Skating club: Elite Blades
- Retired: 2010

Dikki John Martinez (born October 6, 1991, in Quezon City) is a Filipino figure skater. He was the 2009 Men's Senior Gold medalist of the Philippine Figure Skating Championships along with Mericien Venzon who won the Ladies' Division. Three time Junior Men's gold medalist from 2006 to 2008. He holds the record for most wins in the Junior Men's Division.

== Skating career ==
When he was young, his parents used to take him to watch Disney On Ice every December. He was inspired and started skating at the age of 8 at SM Southmall Ice Skating Rink. He was first coached by Alberto Aguilar and joined several ISI local competitions. Then moved to Coach AL Marinas when he reached advance and competitive level. He also does Pair Skating aside from doing solo performances with his found partner, Anne Clarisse Roman.

In 2003, he competed at Skate Hong Kong at Festival Walk Glacier and won several medals. In 2005, he became part of the Philippine Team who secured the title as "Team Champion" in Skate Asia 2005 held in Bangkok, Thailand and also at Skate Asia 2006 in Shenzhen, China where he passed his Freestyle 9 level test. When the Philippines adapted ISU standards, he had to adapt to the new judging system. From 2006 to 2008, He was the reigning National Junior Champion and the Philippine Grand Prix Championships.

He became a part of the reality TV Show, STARS ON ICE! on Qtv 11, where he was paired with Mojofly lead singer, Lougee Basabas. He was chosen to be part of the National Team and won 2nd place at the Asian Regional Juniors Figure Skating Challenge, Junior Men's Division, held in Bangkok, Thailand, sanctioned by the ASU ( Asian Skating Union) in October 2008.

Later on, passed and won Senior level at the 2009 Philippine Nationals held at SM Mall of Asia. Also, during that year, he decided to retire from competitive figure skating to focus on his studies and coaching after earning a spot to compete at the Nebelhorn Trophy in Germany, in which he declined. He still performs at competitions during the opening or closing ceremonies in the Philippines.

Presently, he lives in Las Pinas City. He was part of the Filipino comedy movie,"Mamarazzi" as one of the skater in the Dream sequence. In August 2011, he performed at the annual Skate Asia Held in Bangkok, Thailand and skating to the music of "Who wants to live forever?". In August 2012, he performed at the closing ceremony of the annual Skate Asia held in Kuala Lumpur, Malaysia and also later that year, he also performed for the Skate Bandung Competition closing ceremonies held in Bandung, Indonesia.

In 2014, he joined tour as a skater with Disney on Ice.

== Personal life ==
Martinez was born in Quezon City, Philippines. He currently lives Las Pinas City with his mother and two sisters whenever he goes on breaks from tour.

He graduated from high school in 2008 and graduated from college October 2011 with the degree of Bachelor of Science in Tourism Management at Lyceum of the Philippines University. He currently owns a travel agency along with his sister.

He also considered fencing and swimming as well as another recreational past time aside from figure skating.

== Programs ==
| Season | Short Program | Free Skating | Exhibition |
|---|---|---|---|
| 2008–2009 | The National Treasure by Trevor Rabin | Pirates of The Caribbean by Klaus Badelt | |
| 2009–2010 | Swing, Swing, Swing | Carmen suite by Georges Bizet | |
