= Aleksandr Korovin =

Russian-Filipino pair skater (born 1994)

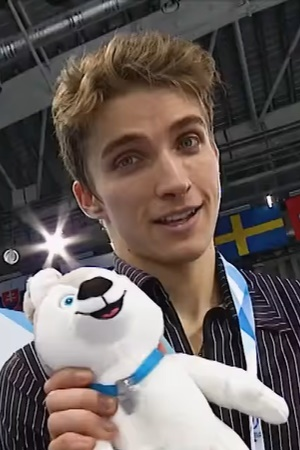
- Korovin at the 2019 Winter Universiade

Personal information
- Native name: Александр Сергеевич Коровин
- Full name: Aleksandr Sergeyevich Korovin
- Other names: Alexander Korovin
- Born: 15 February 1994 (age 32) Pervouralsk, Russia
- Height: 1.81 m (5 ft 11 1/2 in)

Figure skating career
- Country: Philippines (since 2022); Russia (2012–20)
- Discipline: Pair skating
- Partner: Isabella Gamez (since 2021); Alisa Efimova (2015–20); Alexandra Minina (2012–13)
- Coach: Dmitri Savin; Fedor Klimov
- Skating club: Philippine Skating Union
- Began skating: 1999

Medal record
Representing Philippines
Philippine Championships
Gold medal – first place	2022 Pasay	Pairs
Gold medal – first place	2023 Manila	Pairs

Aleksandr Korovin (also spelled as "Alexander Korovin"; Russian: Александр Сергеевич Коровин; born 15 February 1994) is a Russian and Filipino pair skater. Korovin has represented the Philippines with Isabella Gamez since 2021, having represented Russia prior.

Korovin and Gamez are the first pair from Southeast Asia and the Philippines to qualify and compete at the World Figure Skating Championships. They are the first international medalists for the Philippines in pairs skating, first pair to compete at the Grand Prix of Figure Skating for Southeast Asia and the Philippines, and the two-time Philippine National Champions for pairs skating, bringing attention to the sport in the tropical country and the Southeast Asian region.

Earlier in his career, Korovin represented Russia with Alisa Efimova. The pair won one Grand Prix medal, silver at the 2018 Skate America, and six medals on the ISU Challenger Series, including gold at the 2018 CS Nebelhorn Trophy and 2018 CS Golden Spin of Zagreb.

== Career ==
=== Early career ===
Korovin began learning to skate in 1999. He switched from single skating to pairs in 2010. Competing with his first partner, Alexandra Minina, he placed ninth at the 2013 Russian Junior Championships. He teamed up with Alisa Efimova in 2014. Their international debut came in February 2016 at the Hellmut Seibt Memorial. They won the silver medal, finishing second to Italy's Valentina Marchei / Ondřej Hotárek.

=== Pair skating with Alisa Efimova (for Russia) ===
==== 2016–2017 season ====
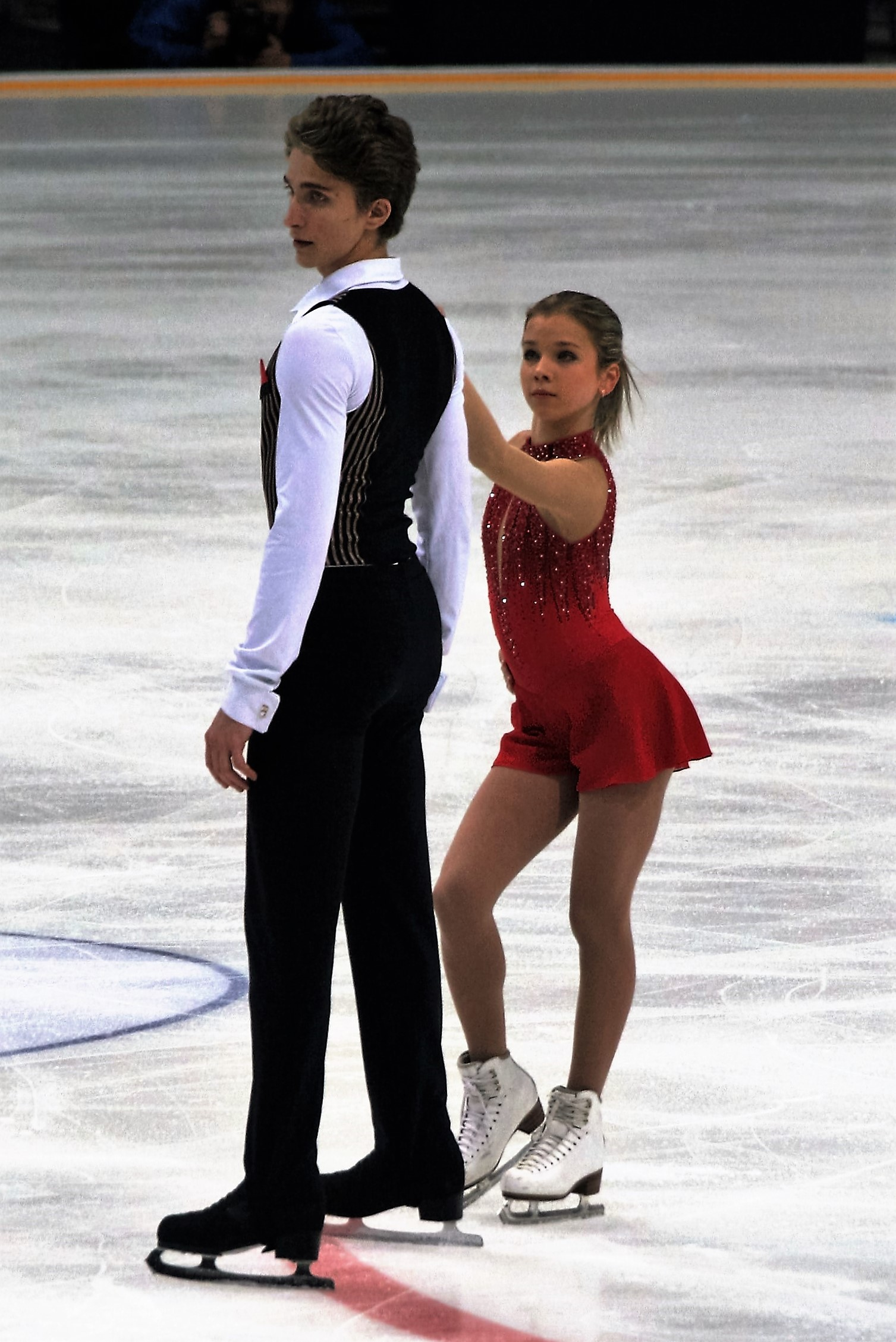
Efimova/Korovin at the 2016 Rostelecom Cup

Coached by Natalia Pavlova and Alexander Zaitsev in Moscow, Efimova/Korovin debuted on the Grand Prix series, placing seventh at the 2016 Rostelecom Cup in November. Later that month, the two received the silver medal at the 2016 CS Tallinn Trophy, having ranked second in the short program, first in the free skate, and second overall behind Alina Ustimkina / Nikita Volodin of Russia. After placing eighth at the 2017 Russian Championships, they took silver at the Cup of Tyrol in March 2017.

==== 2017–2018 season ====
Efimova/Korovin relocated to Saint Petersburg to be coached by Oleg Vasiliev and Tamara Moskvina. In September, the pair placed fifth at their season opener, the 2017 CS Lombardia Trophy and then won bronze at the 2017 CS Ondrej Nepela Trophy a week later. In November, they took silver at the 2017 CS Tallinn Trophy behind Australia's Ekaterina Alexandrovskaya / Harley Windsor. They had no Grand Prix assignments. They finished ninth at the 2018 Russian Championships.

==== 2018–2019 season ====
In September, Efimova/Korovin won their first international gold medal at their first event of the season, the 2018 CS Nebelhorn Trophy. Ranked fourth in the short program and first in the free skate, they outscored the silver medalists, Alexa Scimeca Knierim / Chris Knierim, by 1.72 points.

Efimova/Korovin competed at two Grand Prix events, the 2018 Skate America and 2018 Rostelecom Cup. In October, Efimova/Korovin won their first Grand Prix medal, silver, at the 2018 Skate America. Ranked second in the short program and third in the free skate, they won the silver medal behind their teammates Evgenia Tarasova / Vladimir Morozov. In mid-November, they competed at the 2018 Rostelecom Cup, where they finished fifth after placing fourth in the short program and fifth in the free skate.

In early December, Efimova/Korovin won their second Challenger Series gold medal of the season at the 2018 CS Golden Spin of Zagreb. Ranked first in the short program and second in the free skate, they again narrowly beat Alexa Scimeca Knierim / Chris Knierim. This time Efimova/Korovin beat them by 1.05 points. Efimova/Korovin scored their best score of 183.89 points at this event.

At the 2019 Russian Championships, Efimova/Korovin placed sixth. They then finished the season by winning gold at the 2019 Winter Universiade.

==== 2019–2020 season ====
Beginning the season on the Challenger series, Efimova/Korovin were seventh at the 2019 CS Nebelhorn Trophy, then won the silver medal at the 2019 CS Finlandia Trophy. They finished eighth of eight teams at the 2019 Cup of China. They placed fourth at the 2019 NHK Trophy.

At the 2020 Russian Championships, Efimova/Korovin placed fourth in the short program. The free skate was a struggle, with them placing tenth in that segment and dropping to ninth place overall. It was announced afterward that they had split.

=== Pair skating with Isabella Gamez (for the Philippines) ===
==== 2020–2021 & 2021–2022 seasons ====
Korovin did not compete during the 2020–2021 and 2021–2022 seasons as he awaited his release from the Figure Skating Federation of Russia. In August 2021, the Philippine Skating Union announced that Isabella Gamez had teamed up with Russian skater Aleksandr Korovin to represent the Philippines. Korovin and Gamez were paired by 2014 Winter Olympics pairs champion Maxim Trankov and Olympic, World Championship coach Marina Zoueva. They met and began training together in early 2021. For the 2021–2022 season, Gamez and Korovin focused on their training at Hertz Arena with coach, Marina Zoueva, and her team in Estero, Florida.

Per International Skating Union regulations, one partner of the two in pair figure skating requires citizenship of the represented country to compete in International Skating Union events up to the World Figure Skating Championships level. This enabled Korovin to compete as a pair for the Philippines starting in 2022, prior to receiving his Filipino citizenship in 2024 because his partner, Gamez is a Philippine citizen born to Filipinos.

==== 2022–2023 season ====
The Korovin/Gamez pair made their debut at the 2022 CS Finlandia Trophy, where they placed ninth after two years of inactivity. The pair shared before their international debut, Hurricane Ian devastated Southwest Florida affecting their training venue and practice schedule a week before Finland. In their second competition together, Korovin and Gamez achieved a historical milestone for the Philippines. They won the first-ever medal for Philippine pairs skating in an international competition, a silver medal at the Trophée Métropole Nice Côte d’Azur in Nice, France. They competed at the 2022 CS Warsaw Cup placing 11th, and withdrew from the Golden Spin of Zagreb due to injury. Gamez/Korovin continued the season to become the first Senior Pairs team to win Philippine Figure Skating Championships bringing awareness to the pairs discipline in the tropical country as the only competitors in December 2022. They qualified and competed at the 2023 Four Continents Championships in Colorado Springs placing ninth. They competed at the Challenge Cup in Tilburg, Netherlands, where they placed 6th, and earned the technical minimums to become the first Southeast Asian and Philippine pairs team to qualify and compete in the final segment for the 2023 World Figure Skating Championships in Saitama, Japan.

Korovin publicly expressed his wish to be granted Filipino citizenship after becoming the first Philippine National Champions for Pairs Figure Skating with Gamez while in Manila in December 2022, sharing his commitment to the Philippines and opportunities to grow figure skating in the country.

==== 2023–2024 season ====
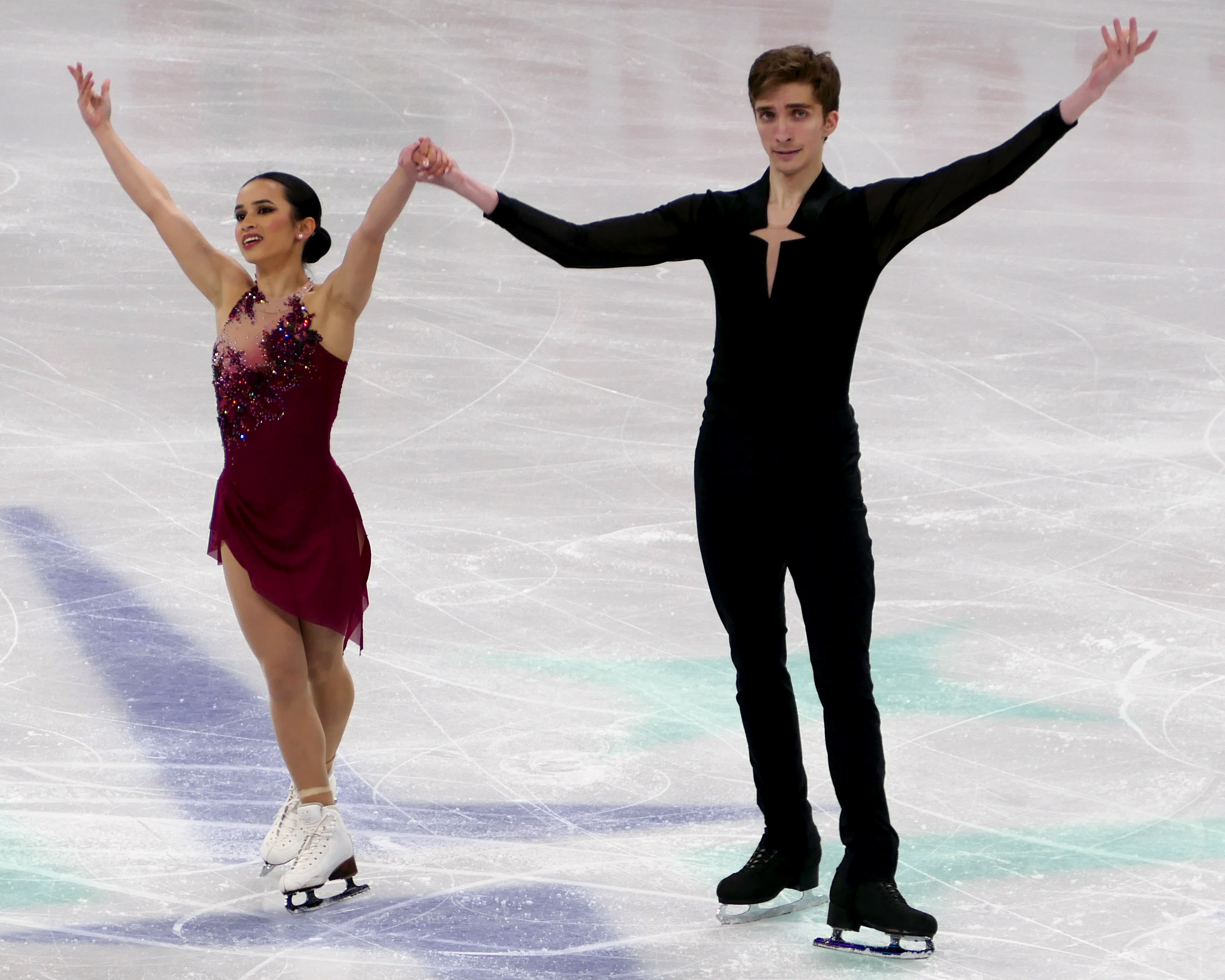
Gamez/Korovin at the 2024 World Figure Skating Championships

Prior to the season, it was announced that Gamez/Korovin had relocated to Montclair, New Jersey, where they were now being coached by Dmitri Savin, Alexei Bychenko, Evgeni Krasnopolski, and Galit Chait.

They would start their second season together by competing at John Nicks Pairs Challenge in New York, NY and 2023 CS Autumn Classic International in Montreal, Canada in September 2023. They withdrew from October 2023 competitions due to a COVID-diagnosis and returned to compete at Philippine Figure Skating Championships in November 2023, where they won their second National Championship title at SM Mall of Asia in Manila, Philippines. In January 2024, they competed at the 2024 Four Continents Championships in Shanghai, China, where they placed 11th and competed at the 2024 World Figure Skating Championships in Montreal, Canada as the only competitors representing the Philippines. The pair would finish in twenty-first place.

==== 2024–25 season ====
Prior to the season, Fedor Klimov joined Gamez and Korovin's coaching team. They began the season by finishing ninth at the 2024 John Nicks International Pairs Competition. They went on to compete at the 2024 Trophée Métropole Nice Côte d'Azur; however, after completing the short program segment, the pairs free skate event was cancelled due to poor weather conditions. Gamez and Korovin were awarded the silver medal based on their short program result.

Not initially assigned to compete on the Grand Prix series, Gamez and Korovin were later entered to compete at the 2024 NHK Trophy. However, they were unable to accept the assignment due to the short notice invitation. They were later assigned to the 2024 Cup of China following another team's withdrawal. At 2024 Cup of China, Gamez and Korovin became the first Southeast Asian and Philippine pair to compete at the Grand Prix of Figure Skating. They finished the event in seventh place. In February 2025, Korovin and Gamez became the first Southeast Asian and Philippine pair team to compete at the 2025 Asian Winter Games in Harbin, China. They placed fourth, just short of the first-ever medal for the Philippines. Korovin and Gamez went on to the 2025 Four Continents Figure Skating Championships in Seoul, Korea finishing in 10th place despite dealing with illness, following the competition withdrawal of their teammate Philippines single men representative Paolo Borromeo.

==== 2025–2026 season ====
Gamez/Korovin opened the season by winning the bronze medal at the 2025 Asian Open Trophy. They went on to compete at the Challenger Series Kinoshita Cup in Osaka, Japan, where they placed 6th, then the Winter Olympics Qualifiers in Beijing, China where they placed 11th. Gamez/Korovin competed at the Golden Spin of Zagreb in Croatia, then concluded their season at 2026 Four Continents Figure Skating Championships in Beijing, China earning a 10th-place finish.

== Personal life ==
Korovin was born in Pervouralsk, Russia. He speaks Russian, English and is learning Filipino.

After teaming up with Isabella Gamez to compete for the Philippines, bills were soon filed in the House of Representatives and the Senate of the Philippines proposing Filipino citizenship for Korovin via naturalization. The proposals were approved by both chambers in 2024, and signed by President Bongbong Marcos on 20 December 2024, granting Korovin Philippine citizenship. On January 8, 2025, Korovin took his oath of citizenship as a naturalized Filipino before Senator Francis Tolentino.

== Programs ==
=== Pair skating with Isabella Gamez (for the Philippines) ===
Season	Short program	Free skating
2025–2026	November by Max Richter choreo. by Sofia Evdokimova	Malagueña by Ernesto Lecuona choreo. by Marina Zoueva, Ilia Tkachenko
2024–2025	La Bohème (Stelios Remix) by Charles Aznavour choreo. by Pasquale Camerlengo, Galit Chait	Somewhere in Time by Dino choreo. by Marina Zoueva, Ilia Tkachenko
2023–2024	My Love by Kovacs choreo. by Sofia Evdokimova	Somewhere in Time by Dino choreo. by Marina Zoueva, Ilia Tkachenko
2022–2023	I'll Take Care of You performed by Beth Hart and Joe Bonamassa choreo. by Ilia Tkachenko, Massimo Scali	Exogenesis: Symphony: Part 2 (Cross-Pollination); Exogenesis: Symphony: Part 3 (Redemption) by Muse choreo. by Ilia Tkachenko, Massimo Scali

=== Pair skating with Alisa Efimova (for Russia) ===
Season	Short program	Free skating	Exhibition
2019–2020	Carmina Burana by Carl Orff choreo. by Elena Maselennikova, Alexander Stepin	The Sound of Silence by Paul Simon performed by Disturbed choreo. by Elena Maselennikova, Alexander Stepin	
2018–2019	Human by Rag'n'Bone Man choreo. by Alexander Stepin	La Strada by Nino Rota	Gypsy Dance
2017–2018	Joue Jusqu'au Matin by Yoska Nemeth choreo. by Julia Goriunova	La Strada by Nino Rota	
2016–2017	Chilly Cha Cha by Jessica Jay choreo. by Julia Goriunova	Tales from the Vienna Woods; Kaiser-Walzer by Johann Strauss II choreo. by Julia Goriunova	
2015–2016	The Very Thought of You	New York, New York	Девятое мая performed by Soso Pavliashvili
2014–2015	El día que me quieras by Raúl Di Blasio	New York, New York	

== Competitive highlights ==
=== Pair skating with Isabella Gamez (for the Philippines) ===
- GP – Event of the ISU Grand Prix Series
- CS – Event of the ISU Challenger Series
- TBD – Assigned
- WD – Withdrew from competition

Competition placements at senior level
Season	2022–23	2023–24	2024–25	2025–26
World Championships	18th	21st		
Four Continents Championships	9th	11th	10th	10th
Philippine Championships	1st	1st		
GP Cup of China			7th	
CS Autumn Classic		10th		
CS Finlandia Trophy	9th			
CS Golden Spin of Zagreb	WD			13th
CS John Nicks Pairs Challenge		6th	9th	
CS Kinoshita Group Cup				6th
CS Warsaw Cup	11th			
Asian Open Trophy				3rd
Asian Winter Games			4th	
Challenge Cup	6th			
Skate to Milano				11th
Trophée Métropole Nice	2nd		2nd	

=== Pair skating with Alisa Efimova (for Russia) ===
Competition placements at senior level
Season	2015–16	2016–17	2017–18	2018–19	2019–20
Russian Championships	9th	8th	9th	6th	9th
GP Cup of China					8th
GP NHK Trophy					4th
GP Rostelecom Cup		7th		5th	
GP Skate America				2nd	
CS Finlandia Trophy					2nd
CS Golden Spin of Zagreb				1st	
CS Lombardia Trophy			5th		
CS Nebelhorn Trophy				1st	7th
CS Ondrej Nepela Trophy			3rd		
CS Tallinn Trophy		2nd	2nd		
Cup of Tyrol		2nd			
Hellmut Seibt Memorial	2nd				
Winter Universiade				1st	

=== Pair skating with Alexandra Minina (for Russia) ===
National
Event	2012–13
Russian Junior Championships	9th

== Detailed results ==
=== Pair skating with Isabella Gamez (for the Philippines) ===
ISU personal best scores in the +5/-5 GOE System
Segment	Type	Score	Event
Total	TSS	157.04	2024 CS John Nicks Pairs Competition
Short program	TSS	57.28	2024 CS John Nicks Pairs Competition
Short program	TES	31.34	2024 CS John Nicks Pairs Competition
Short program	PCS	25.94	2024 CS John Nicks Pairs Competition
Free skating	TSS	100.61	2024 Cup of China
Free skating	TES	49.76	2023 World Championships
Free skating	PCS	52.36	2024 Cup of China

Results in the 2022–23 season
Date	Event	SP		FS		Total	
Date	Event	P	Score	P	Score	P	Score
Oct 4–9, 2022	(Finland) 2022 CS Finlandia Trophy	9	44.25	9	78.15	9	122.40
Oct 19–23, 2022	(France) 2022 Trophée Métropole Nice Côte d'Azur	3	48.32	1	95.22	2	143.54
Nov 17–20, 2022	(Poland) 2022 CS Warsaw Cup	11	42.94	11	84.66	11	127.60
Dec 7–10, 2022	(Croatia) 2022 CS Golden Spin of Zagreb	14	39.71	—N/a	—N/a	–	WD
Dec 19–20, 2022	(Philippines) 2022 Philippine Championships	1		1		1	
Feb 7–12, 2023	(United States) 2023 Four Continents Championships	10	39.69	9	73.79	9	113.48
Feb 23–26, 2023	(Netherlands) 2023 International Challenge Cup	6	54.74	8	95.27	6	150.01
Mar 20–26, 2023	(Japan) 2023 World Championships	19	53.29	18	93.78	18	147.07

Results in the 2023–24 season
Date	Event	SP		FS		Total	
Date	Event	P	Score	P	Score	P	Score
Sep 6–7, 2023	(United States) 2023 John Nicks Pairs Challenge	8	46.73	6	91.66	6	138.39
Sep 14–17, 2023	(Canada) 2023 CS Autumn Classic International	10	37.40	10	85.25	10	122.65
Nov 10–11, 2023	(Philippines) 2023 Philippine Championships	1	49.62	1	92.97	1	142.59
Jan 30 – Feb 4, 2024	(China) 2024 Four Continents Championships	12	49.79	11	93.07	11	142.86
Mar 18–24, 2024	(Canada) 2024 World Championships	21	49.70	—N/a	—N/a	21	49.70

Results in the 2024–25 season
Date	Event	SP		FS		Total	
Date	Event	P	Score	P	Score	P	Score
Sep 3–4, 2024	(United States) 2024 CS John Nicks Pairs Competition	6	57.28	9	99.76	9	157.04
Oct 16–20, 2024	(France) 2024 Trophée Métropole Nice Côte d'Azur	2	55.73	—N/a	—N/a	2	55.73
Nov 22–24, 2024	2024 Cup of China	7	50.65	7	100.61	7	151.26
Feb 7-14, 2025	(China) 2025 Asian Winter Games	4	55.63	4	99.99	4	155.62
Feb 19–23, 2025	(South Korea) 2025 Four Continents Championships	11	50.95	10	99.13	10	150.08

Note: The senior pairs free skate at the 2024 Trophée Métropole Nice Côte d'Azur was cancelled on account of inclement weather. It was later announced that the short program results would be considered as the final results for the competition.

Results in the 2025–26 season
Date	Event	SP		FS		Total	
Date	Event	P	Score	P	Score	P	Score
Aug 1-5, 2025	(Philippines) 2025 Asian Open Trophy	2	55.69	3	87.80	3	143.49
Sep 5-7, 2025	(Japan) 2025 CS Kinoshita Group Cup	6	51.60	6	85.94	6	141.14
Sep 18-21, 2025	(China) 2025 ISU Skate to Milano	8	53.14	11	80.55	11	133.69
Dec 3-6, 2025	(Croatia) 2025 CS Golden Spin of Zagreb	15	42.61	13	94.78	13	137.39
Jan 21-25, 2026	(China) 2026 Four Continents Championships	11	47.77	10	95.28	10	143.05

=== Pair skating with Alisa Efimova (for Russia) ===
2019–2020 season
Date	Event	SP	FS	Total
24–29 December 2019	2020 Russian Championships	4; 72.83	10; 113.14	9; 185.97
22–24 November 2019	2019 NHK Trophy	4; 64.94	4; 124.40	4; 189.34
8–10 November 2019	2019 Cup of China	6; 63.97	8; 106.22	8; 170.19
11–13 October 2019	2019 CS Finlandia Trophy	2; 69.12	3; 125.16	2; 194.28
25–28 September 2019	2019 CS Nebelhorn Trophy	8; 59.94	7; 111.52	7; 171.46
2018–2019 season
Date	Event	SP	FS	Total
7–9 March 2019	2019 Winter Universiade	2; 57.72	1; 113.29	1; 171.01
19–23 December 2018	2019 Russian Championships	6; 70.61	6; 129.06	6; 199.67
5–8 December 2018	2018 CS Golden Spin of Zagreb	1; 65.84	2; 118.05	1; 183.89
16–18 November 2018	2018 Rostelecom Cup	4; 65.46	5; 116.16	5; 181.62
19–21 October 2018	2018 Skate America	2; 62.38	3; 116.60	2; 178.98
26–29 September 2018	2018 CS Nebelhorn Trophy	4; 56.42	1; 122.52	1; 178.94
2017–2018 season
Date	Event	SP	FS	Total
21–24 December 2017	2018 Russian Championships	8; 63.44	10; 113.19	9; 176.63
21–26 November 2017	2017 CS Tallinn Trophy	2; 64.58	3; 98.04	2; 162.62
21–23 September 2017	2017 CS Ondrej Nepela Trophy	3; 61.82	3; 109.40	3; 171.22
14–17 September 2017	2017 CS Lombardia Trophy	5; 56.54	6; 104.16	5; 160.70
2016–2017 season
Date	Event	SP	FS	Total
28 February – 5 March 2017	2017 Cup of Tyrol	2; 59.88	2; 101.70	2; 161.58
20–26 December 2016	2017 Russian Championships	6; 63.69	8; 112.91	8; 176.60
20–27 November 2016	2016 CS Tallinn Trophy	2; 57.62	1; 103.06	2; 160.68
4–6 November 2016	2016 Rostelecom Cup	6; 61.27	7; 103.80	7; 165.07
2015–2016 season
Date	Event	SP	FS	Total
23–28 February 2016	2016 Hellmut Seibt Memorial	2; 50.21	2; 112.26	2; 162.47
23–27 December 2015	2016 Russian Championships	11; 54.34	9; 106.96	9; 161.30
