= Isabella Gamez =

American-Filipino pair skater (born 1999)

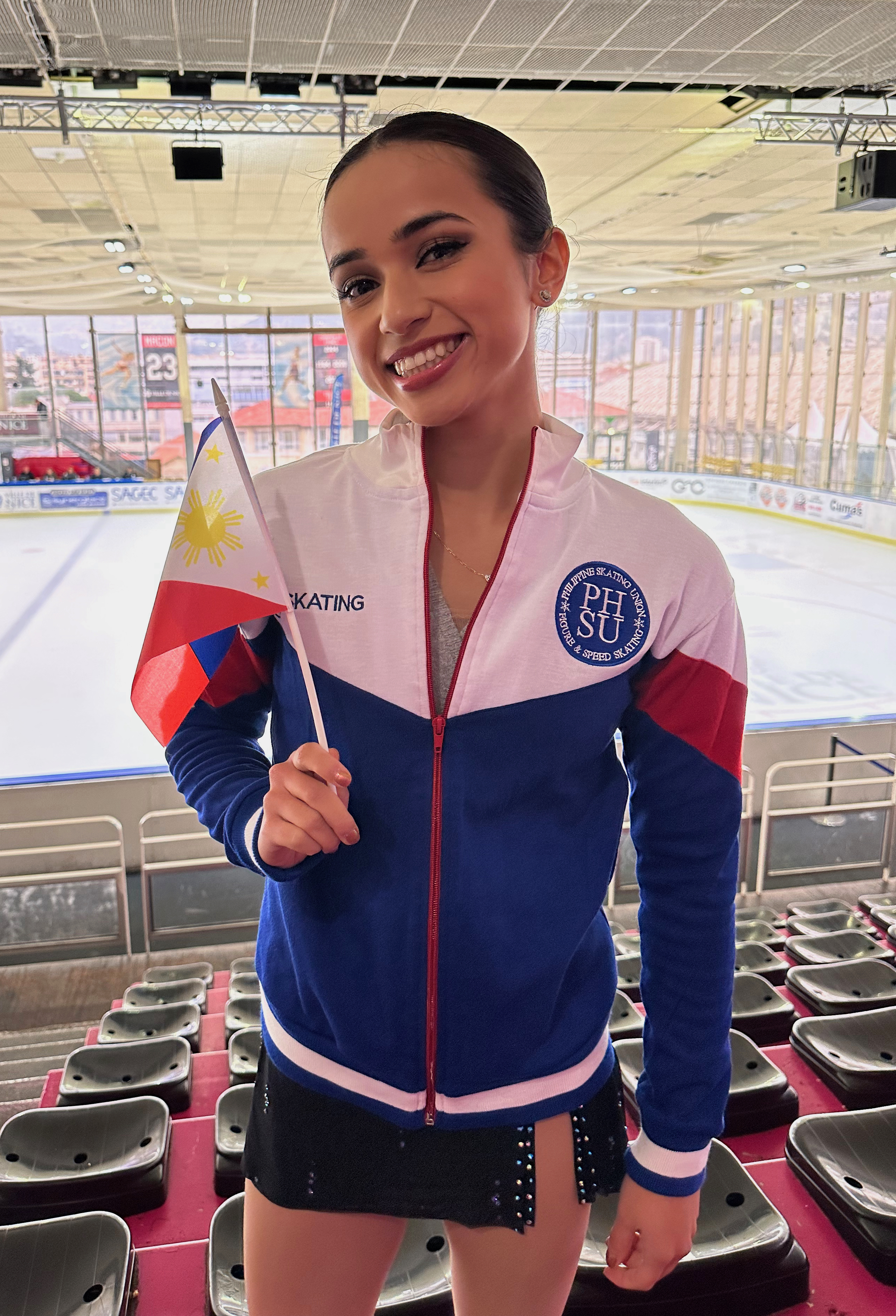
- Gamez in 2022

Personal information
- Full name: Isabella Marie Gamez
- Born: February 1, 1999 (age 27) Cape Coral, Florida, U.S.
- Height: 4 ft 11 in (1.49 m)

Figure skating career
- Country: Philippines (since 2019); Spain (2017–18); United States (2016–17)
- Discipline: Pair skating
- Partner: Aleksandr Korovin (since 2022); David-Alexandre Paradis (2019–20); Tòn Cónsul (2017–18); Griffin Schwab (2016–17)
- Coach: Dmitri Savin; Fedor Klimov
- Skating club: Philippine Skating Union
- Began skating: 2005

Medal record
Representing Philippines
Philippine Championships
Gold medal – first place	2022 Pasay	Pairs
Gold medal – first place	2023 Manila	Pairs

Isabella Marie Gamez (born February 1, 1999) is an American-born Filipino pair skater who competes for the Philippines with her partner Aleksandr Korovin. Gamez and Korovin are the first pair from Southeast Asia and the Philippines to qualify and compete in the final segment of the World Championships (2023). They are the first international medalists for the Philippines in pairs skating, first pair to compete at the Grand Prix of Figure Skating for Southeast Asia and the Philippines, as well as two-time Philippine National champions.

With her former skating partner, David-Alexandre Paradis, Isabella competed in the final segment at the 2020 Four Continents Championships. They were the first figure skating pairs team to represent the Philippines at an International Skating Union competition.

Competing for Spain in junior pairs with her former skating partner, Tòn Cónsul, she is the 2018 Spanish Junior National champion and finished 13th at the 2018 World Junior Championships.

== Personal life ==
Gamez was born on February 1, 1999, to Filipino parents. Both parents were born and raised in Quezon City. Gamez is the grandniece of former Philippines Olympics basketball player, Senator Freddie Webb on her mother's side. Her paternal grandfather is Dr. Gilberto Gamez, former Dean of University of Santo Tomas in the Philippines. She grew up regularly spending time in Manila, maintaining a close tie to her Philippine roots and both sides of her family living there. In addition to figure skating, Gamez is a scuba diver, who spends time in Anilao, Mabini, Batangas. She also enjoys painting and baking.

On March 20, 2024, Isabella Gamez was among the major Filipina athlete awardees at the inaugural Women in Sports Awards, hosted by the Philippine Sports Commission at the Rizal Memorial Coliseum in Manila.

== Career ==
=== Early career ===
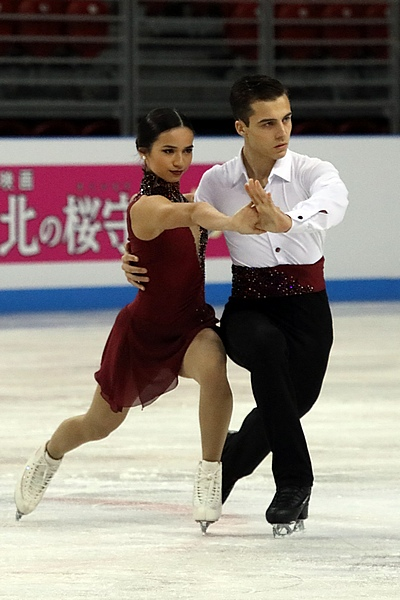
Gamez/Cónsul at the 2018 World Junior Championships

Gamez started as a singles skater before switching to pairs starting as a novice. Gamez teamed up with Griffin Schwab in pairs from the 2015–16 season. They earned the novice silver medal in their first season at the 2016 U.S. Championships.

In 2017, Gamez teamed up with Spanish skater Tòn Cónsul to represent Spain for juniors pairs. They competed at two Junior Grand Prix events, finishing 11th in Zagreb and 13th in Gdańsk. Gamez/Cónsul then won the 2018 Spanish junior national title and the 2018 Mentor Toruń Cup. They ended the season with a thirteenth-place finish at the 2018 World Junior Championships.

=== Partnership with Paradis ===
==== 2019–2020 season: Switch to the Philippines and debut of Gamez/Paradis ====
Gamez began representing the Philippines in a new senior pair with Canadian skater David-Alexandre Paradis. Gamez/Paradis competed at three Challenger Series events, becoming the first Filipino and Southeast Asian pair to compete in an International Skating Union competition. They then finished seventh at Volvo Open Cup. Gamez/Paradis also earned the technical minimums for the 2020 Four Continents Championships to become the first Filipino and Southeast Asian pair to compete at an ISU Championship. They finished ninth at Four Continents. Gamez/Paradis concluded their season with an eleventh-place finish at the Challenge Cup.

Gamez and Paradis split due to travel restrictions and inability to train together during the COVID-19 pandemic. Paradis retired from pairs skating to focus on his coaching career.

=== Partnership with Korovin ===
==== 2020–2021 and 2021–2022 seasons ====
In August 2021, the Philippine Skating Union announced that Gamez had teamed up with Russian skater Aleksandr Korovin to represent the Philippines. Korovin and Gamez were paired by 2014 Winter Olympics pairs champion Maxim Trankov and Olympic, World Championship coach Marina Zoueva. They met and began training together in early 2021. For the 2021–2022 season, Gamez and Korovin focused on their training at Hertz Arena with coach, Marina Zoueva, and her team in Estero, Florida.

==== 2022–2023 season: Debut of Gamez/Korovin, Philippine national title ====
The Gamez/Korovin pair made their debut at the 2022 CS Finlandia Trophy, where they placed ninth after two years of inactivity. The pair shared before their international debut, Hurricane Ian devastated Southwest Florida affecting their training venue and practice schedule a week before Finland. In their second competition together, Gamez and Korovin achieved a historical milestone for the Philippines. They won the first-ever medal for Philippine pairs skating in an international competition, a silver medal at the Trophée Métropole Nice Côte d'Azur in Nice, France. They competed at the 2022 CS Warsaw Cup placing 11th, and withdrew from the Golden Spin of Zagreb due to injury. Gamez/Korovin continued the season to become the first senior pairs team to win the Philippine Figure Skating Championships, bringing awareness to the pairs discipline in the tropical country as the only competitors in December 2022. They qualified and competed at the 2023 Four Continents Championships in Colorado Springs placing ninth. They competed at the Challenge Cup in Tilburg, Netherlands, where they placed 6th and earned the technical minimums to become the first Southeast Asian and Philippine pairs team to qualify and compete at the 2023 World Figure Skating Championships in Saitama, Japan. They competed in the final segment at the 2023 World Figure Skating Championships ending a five-year drought for the Philippines at the World Figure Skating Championships, wherein the last Philippine skater to compete was Michael Christian Martinez in 2017.

==== 2023–2024 season ====
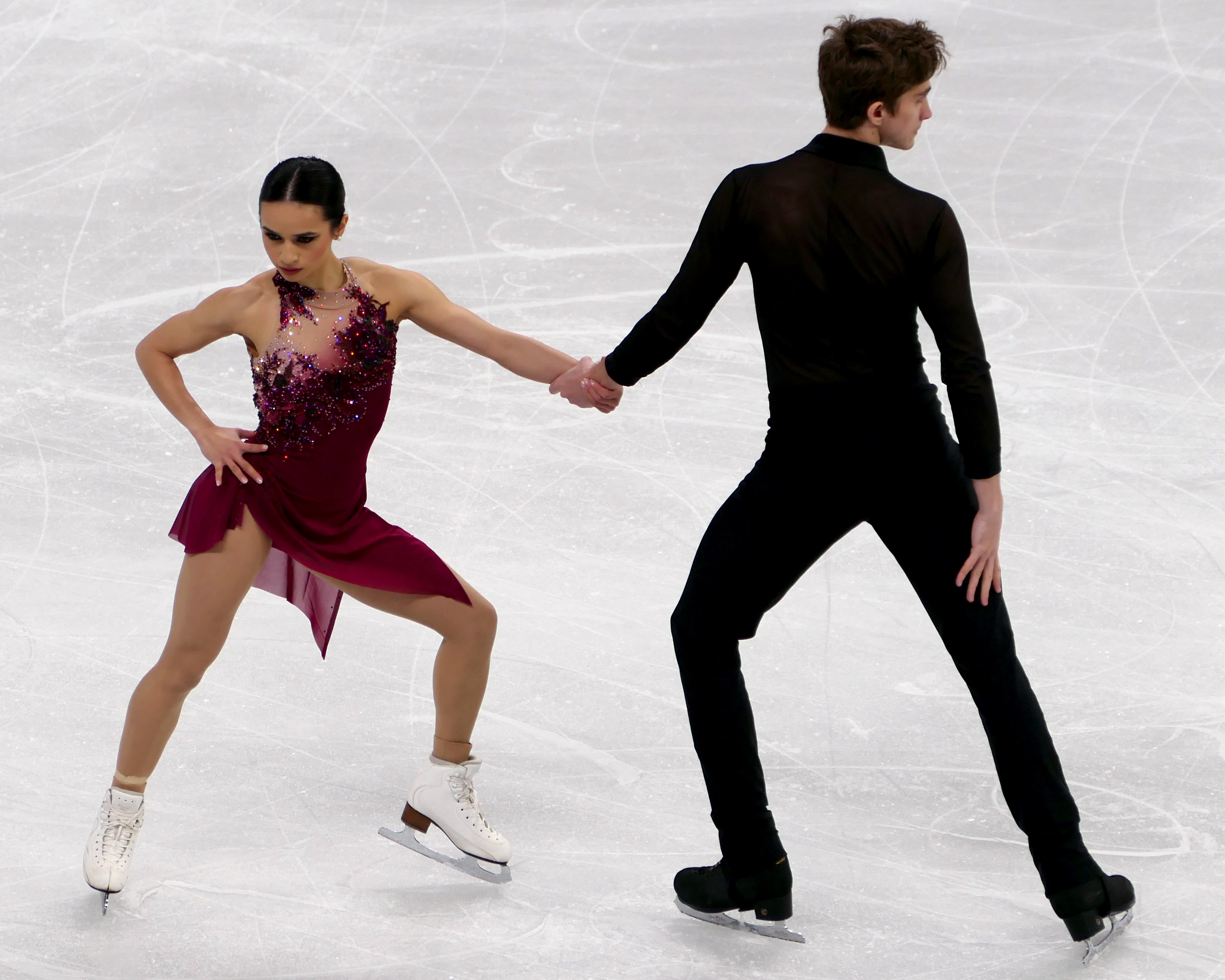
Gamez/Korovin at the 2024 World Figure Skating Championships

Prior to the season, it was announced that Gamez/Korovin had relocated to Montclair, New Jersey, where they were now being coached by Dmitri Savin, Alexei Bychenko, Evgeni Krasnopolski, and Galit Chait.

They would start their second season together by competing at John Nicks Pairs Challenge in New York, NY and 2023 CS Autumn Classic International in Montreal, Canada in September 2023. They withdrew from October 2023 competitions due to a COVID-diagnosis and returned to compete at Philippine Figure Skating Championships in November 2023, where they won their second National Championship title at SM Mall of Asia in Manila, Philippines. In January 2024, they competed at the 2024 Four Continents Championships in Shanghai, China, where they placed eleventh and competed at the 2024 World Figure Skating Championships in Montreal, Canada as the only competitors representing the Philippines at the annual event. They would finish the event in twenty-first place.

==== 2024–2025 season ====
Prior to the season, Fedor Klimov joined Gamez and Korovin's coaching team. They began the season by finishing ninth at the 2024 John Nicks International Pairs Competition. They went on to compete at the 2024 Trophée Métropole Nice Côte d'Azur; however, after completing the short program segment, the pairs free skate event was cancelled due to poor weather conditions. Gamez and Korovin were awarded the silver medal based on their short program result.

Not initially assigned to compete on the Grand Prix series, Gamez and Korovin were later entered to compete at the 2024 NHK Trophy. However, they were unable to accept the assignment due to the short notice invitation. They were later assigned to the 2024 Cup of China following another team's withdrawal. At 2024 Cup of China, Gamez and Korovin became the first Southeast Asian and Philippine pair to compete at the Grand Prix of Figure Skating. Gamez became the first Filipina woman ever at the Grand Prix of Figure Skating. They finished the event in seventh place. In February 2025, Korovin and Gamez became the first Southeast Asian and Philippine pair team to compete at the 2025 Asian Winter Games in Harbin, China. They placed fourth, just short of the first-ever medal for the Philippines. Korovin and Gamez went on to the 2025 Four Continents Figure Skating Championships in Seoul, Korea finishing in 10th place despite dealing with illness, following the competition withdrawal of the Philippines single men representative Paolo Borromeo.

==== 2025–2026 season ====
Gamez/Korovin opened the season by winning the bronze medal at the 2025 Asian Open Trophy. They went on to compete at the Challenger Series Kinoshita Cup in Osaka, Japan, where they placed 6th, then the Winter Olympics Qualifiers in Beijing, China where they placed 11th. Gamez/Korovin competed at the Golden Spin of Zagreb in Croatia, then concluded their season at 2026 Four Continents Figure Skating Championships in Beijing, China earning a 10th-place finish.

== Programs ==
=== With Korovin ===
Season	Short program	Free skating
2025–2026	November by Max Richter choreo. by Sofia Evdokimova	Malagueña by Ernesto Lecuona choreo. by Marina Zoueva, Ilia Tkachenko
2024–2025	La Bohème (Stelios Remix) by Charles Aznavour choreo. by Pasquale Camerlengo, Galit Chait	Somewhere in Time by Dino choreo. by Marina Zoueva, Ilia Tkachenko
2023–2024	My Love by Kovacs choreo. by Sofia Evdokimova	Somewhere in Time by Dino choreo. by Marina Zoueva, Ilia Tkachenko
2022–2023	I'll Take Care of You performed by Beth Hart and Joe Bonamassa choreo. by Ilia Tkachenko, Massimo Scali	Exogenesis: Symphony: Part 2 (Cross-Pollination); Exogenesis: Symphony: Part 3 (Redemption) by Muse choreo. by Ilia Tkachenko, Massimo Scali

=== With Paradis ===
Season	Short program	Free skating
2019–2020	One and Only by Adele choreo. by John Kerr	Parla più piano (from The Godfather) by Nino Rota performed by Katherine Jenkins choreo. by Julie Marcotte

=== With Cónsul ===
Season	Short program	Free skating
2017–2018	Faith by Sleeping at Last choreo. by John Kerr	María de Buenos Aires by Astor Piazzolla choreo. by Julie Marcotte

=== With Schwab ===
Season	Short program	Free skating
2016–2017	Black Magic Woman / Gypsy Queen by Santana choreo. by Phillip Mills	The Firebird by Igor Stravinsky choreo. by Christine Fowler-Binder
2015–2016	Malagueña by Ernesto Lecuona choreo. by Phillip Mills	West Side Story by Leonard Bernstein choreo. by Christine Fowler-Binder

== Competitive highlights ==
=== Pair skating with Aleksandr Korovin (for the Philippines) ===
- GP – Event of the ISU Grand Prix Series
- CS – Event of the ISU Challenger Series
- TBD – Assigned
- WD – Withdrew from competition

Competition placements at senior level
Season	2022–23	2023–24	2024–25	2025–26
World Championships	18th	21st		
Four Continents Championships	9th	11th	10th	10th
Philippine Championships	1st	1st		
GP Cup of China			7th	
CS Autumn Classic		10th		
CS Finlandia Trophy	9th			
CS Golden Spin of Zagreb	WD			13th
CS John Nicks Pairs Challenge		6th	9th	
CS Kinoshita Group Cup				6th
CS Warsaw Cup	11th			
Asian Open Trophy				3rd
Asian Winter Games			4th	
Challenge Cup	6th			
Skate to Milano				11th
Trophée Métropole Nice	2nd		2nd	

=== Pair skating with David-Alexandre Paradis (for the Philippines) ===
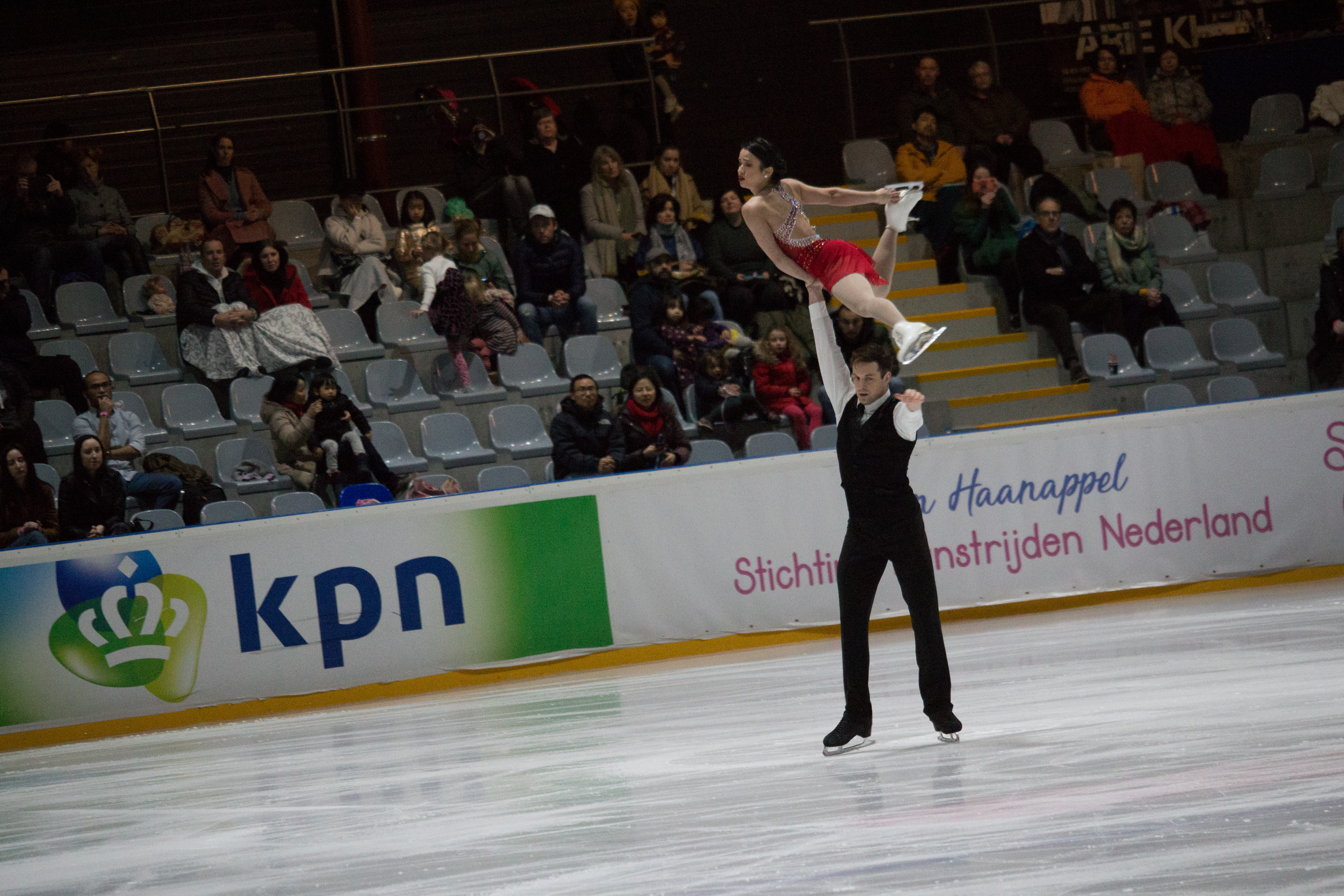
Gamez/Paradis at the 2020 Challenge Cup

International
Event	2019–20
Four Continents	9th
CS Finlandia Trophy	9th
CS Golden Spin	14th
CS Warsaw Cup	11th
Challenge Cup	11th
Volvo Open Cup	7th

=== Pair skating with Tòn Cònsul Vivar (for Spain) ===
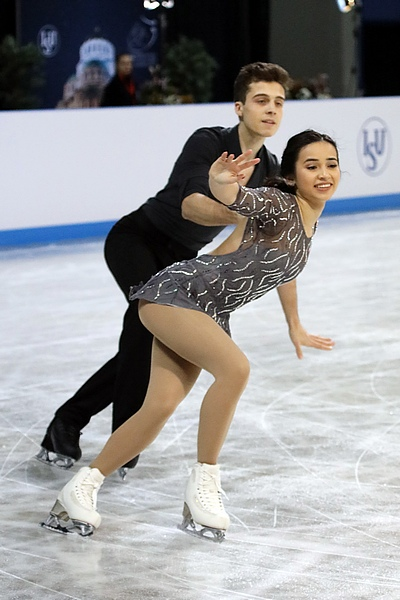
Gamez/Cónsul at the 2018 World Junior Championships

International: Junior
Event	2017–18
Junior Worlds	13th
JGP Croatia	11th
JGP Poland	13th
Toruń Cup	1st
National
Spanish Champ.	1st J

=== Pair skating with Griffin Schwab (for the United States) ===
National
Event	2016–17
U.S. Champ.	9th J

== Detailed results ==
=== Pair skating with Aleksandr Korovin (for the Philippines) ===
ISU personal best scores in the +5/-5 GOE System
Segment	Type	Score	Event
Total	TSS	157.04	2024 CS John Nicks Pairs Competition
Short program	TSS	57.28	2024 CS John Nicks Pairs Competition
Short program	TES	31.34	2024 CS John Nicks Pairs Competition
Short program	PCS	25.94	2024 CS John Nicks Pairs Competition
Free skating	TSS	100.61	2024 Cup of China
Free skating	TES	49.76	2023 World Championships
Free skating	PCS	52.36	2024 Cup of China

Results in the 2022–23 season
Date	Event	SP		FS		Total	
Date	Event	P	Score	P	Score	P	Score
Oct 4–9, 2022	(Finland) 2022 CS Finlandia Trophy	9	44.25	9	78.15	9	122.40
Oct 19–23, 2022	(France) 2022 Trophée Métropole Nice Côte d'Azur	3	48.32	1	95.22	2	143.54
Nov 17–20, 2022	(Poland) 2022 CS Warsaw Cup	11	42.94	11	84.66	11	127.60
Dec 7–10, 2022	(Croatia) 2022 CS Golden Spin of Zagreb	14	39.71	—N/a	—N/a	–	WD
Dec 19–20, 2022	(Philippines) 2022 Philippine Championships	1		1		1	
Feb 7–12, 2023	(United States) 2023 Four Continents Championships	10	39.69	9	73.79	9	113.48
Feb 23–26, 2023	(Netherlands) 2023 International Challenge Cup	6	54.74	8	95.27	6	150.01
Mar 20–26, 2023	(Japan) 2023 World Championships	19	53.29	18	93.78	18	147.07

Results in the 2023–24 season
Date	Event	SP		FS		Total	
Date	Event	P	Score	P	Score	P	Score
Sep 6–7, 2023	(United States) 2023 John Nicks Pairs Challenge	8	46.73	6	91.66	6	138.39
Sep 14–17, 2023	(Canada) 2023 CS Autumn Classic International	10	37.40	10	85.25	10	122.65
Nov 10–11, 2023	(Philippines) 2023 Philippine Championships	1	49.62	1	92.97	1	142.59
Jan 30 – Feb 4, 2024	(China) 2024 Four Continents Championships	12	49.79	11	93.07	11	142.86
Mar 18–24, 2024	(Canada) 2024 World Championships	21	49.70	—N/a	—N/a	21	49.70

Results in the 2024–25 season
Date	Event	SP		FS		Total	
Date	Event	P	Score	P	Score	P	Score
Sep 3–4, 2024	(United States) 2024 CS John Nicks Pairs Competition	6	57.28	9	99.76	9	157.04
Oct 16–20, 2024	(France) 2024 Trophée Métropole Nice Côte d'Azur	2	55.73	—N/a	—N/a	2	55.73
Nov 22–24, 2024	2024 Cup of China	7	50.65	7	100.61	7	151.26
Feb 7-14, 2025	(China) 2025 Asian Winter Games	4	55.63	4	99.99	4	155.62
Feb 19–23, 2025	(South Korea) 2025 Four Continents Championships	11	50.95	10	99.13	10	150.08

Note: The senior pairs free skate at the 2024 Trophée Métropole Nice Côte d'Azur was cancelled on account of inclement weather. It was later announced that the short program results would be considered as the final results for the competition.

Results in the 2025–26 season
Date	Event	SP		FS		Total	
Date	Event	P	Score	P	Score	P	Score
Aug 1-5, 2025	(Philippines) 2025 Asian Open Trophy	2	55.69	3	87.80	3	143.49
Sep 5-7, 2025	(Japan) 2025 CS Kinoshita Group Cup	6	51.60	6	85.94	6	141.14
Sep 18-21, 2025	(China) 2025 ISU Skate to Milano	8	53.14	11	80.55	11	133.69
Dec 3-6, 2025	(Croatia) 2025 CS Golden Spin of Zagreb	15	42.61	13	94.78	13	137.39
Jan 21-25, 2026	(China) 2026 Four Continents Championships	11	47.77	10	95.28	10	143.05

=== With Paradis ===
2019–20 season
Date	Event	SP	FS	Total
February 20–23, 2020	2020 Challenge Cup	11; 45.38	11; 82.74	11; 128.12
February 4–9, 2020	2020 Four Continents Championships	10; 47.34	9; 80.09	9; 127.43
December 4–7, 2019	2019 CS Golden Spin of Zagreb	14; 47.50	15; 88.40	14; 135.90
November 14–17, 2019	2019 CS Warsaw Cup	12; 47.99	8; 97.05	11; 145.04
November 5–10, 2019	2019 Volvo Open Cup	7; 44.37	7; 82.42	7; 126.79
October 11–13, 2019	2019 CS Finlandia Trophy	10; 43.09	9; 81.61	9; 124.70
