= Jules Alpe =

Filipino figure skater (born 1998)

Personal information
- Full name: Jules Vince Alpe
- Born: September 24, 1998 (age 27)

Figure skating career
- Country: Philippines
- Coach: Alexei Fedorov

Jules Vince Alpe (born September 24, 1998) is a Filipino figure skater.

== Career ==
Alpe started figure skating at the skating rink at SM Southmall in Las Piñas, Metro Manila. He practices with Michael Christian Martinez whenever Martinez is training in the Philippines. He stopped his schooling in order to focus on his figure skating career.

He was the champion of the Junior Men category of the 2014 Philippine National Figure Skating Championships

At the Elite Junior Men category of the 2016–17 SEA Figure Skating Challenge in Bangkok, Alpe finished first place placing ahead of Chadwick Tse-Fung Wang of Singapore, the only other competitor. He placed second at the Junior Men Category of the 2017 Jégvirág Cup.

Alpes competed at the 2017 Asian Winter Games where he placed 17th in the short program, free skate, and overall.

== Programs ==
Season	Short program	Free skating
2016-2017	Sixteen Tons	I Put a Spell On You; You Can Leave Your Hat On

== Competitive highlights ==
International
Event	14–15	15–16	16–17
Philippine Champ.	1st J.	1st J.	2nd J.
J. = Junior level
