= Philippine Figure Skating Championships =

Recurring figure skating competition

- Status: Active
- Genre: National championships
- Frequency: Annual
- Country: Philippines
- Inaugurated: 2000
- Organizer: Philippine Skating Union

The Philippine Figure Skating Championships are an annual figure skating competition organized by the Philippine Skating Union to crown the national champions of the Philippines. The first Philippine Championships were held in 2000 in Las Piñas. Medals are awarded in men's singles, women's singles, and pair skating at the senior and junior levels, although each discipline may not necessarily be held every year due to a lack of participants.

Competitive figure skating is relatively new to the Philippines. The first ice rink in the Philippines was built in the early 1990s at the SM Megamall in Mandaluyong. The Philippine Skating Union was established in 2004 and joined the International Skating Union (ISU) that year. Michael Novales became the first skater to represent the Philippines in international competition (at the 2006 Four Continents Figure Skating Championships). Before the Philippines joined the ISU, he competed for the United States.

No competition was held in 2019 on account of the Philippines hosting the 2019 Southeast Asian Games. Additionally, no competitions were held in 2020 and 2021 due to the COVID-19 pandemic. In 2025, the Philippine Skating Union hosted an international event in Pasay, which also served as the Philippines' national championships. The top Filipino competitors at this competition were recognized as the Philippine national champions.

== Senior medalists ==
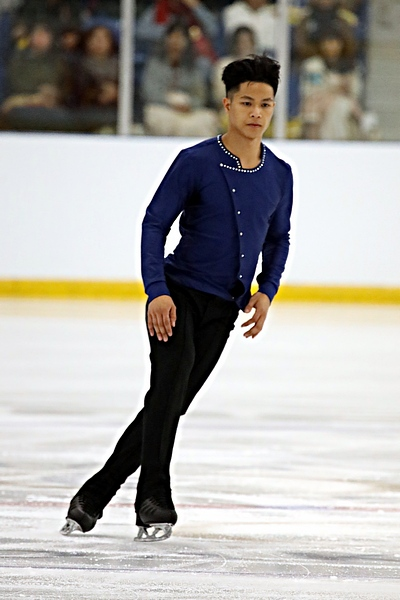
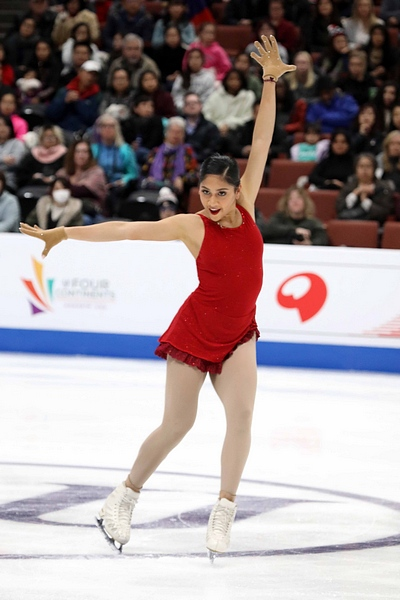
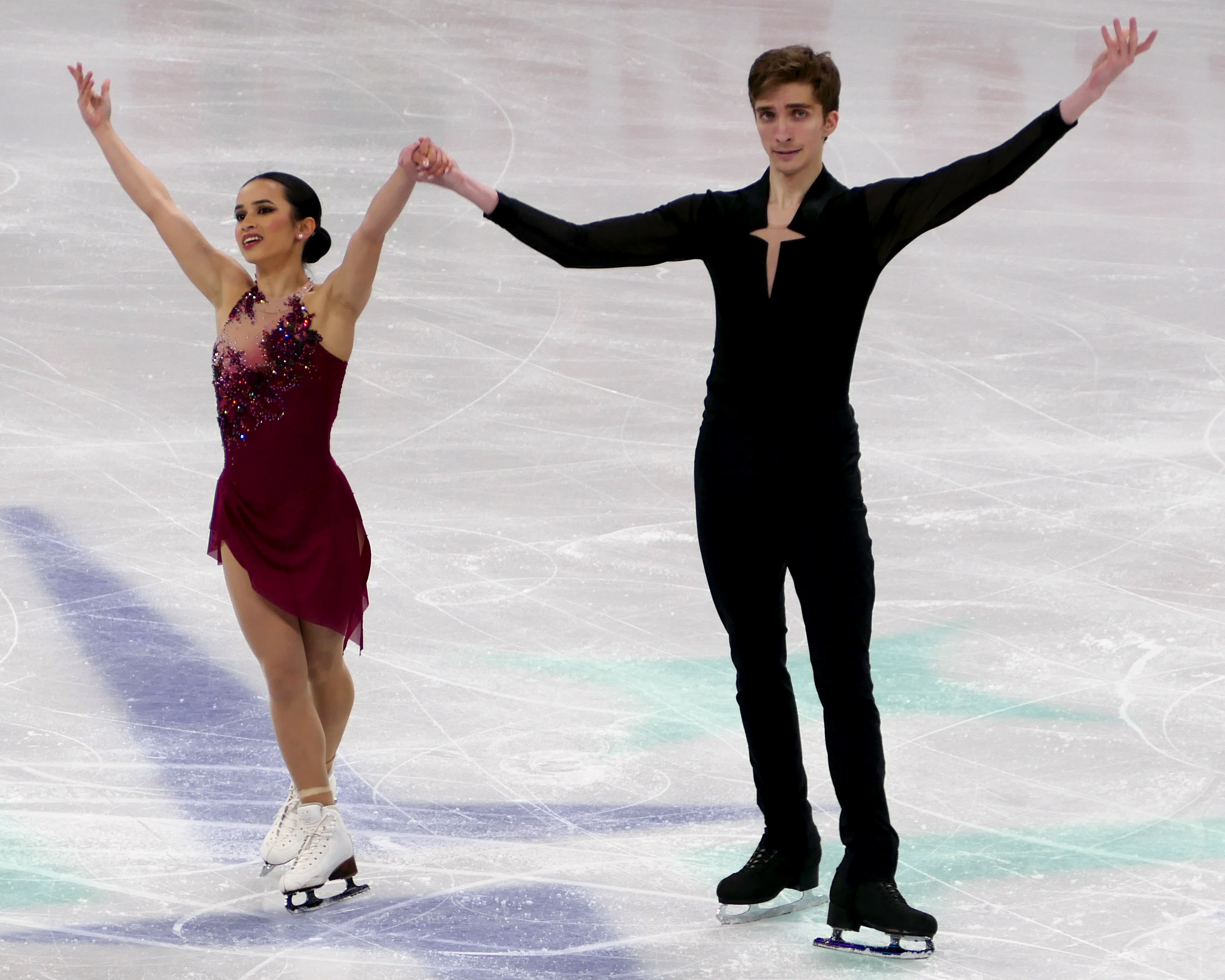
From left to right: Edrian Paul Celestino, two-time Philippine champion in men's singles; Alisson Perticheto, three-time Philippine champion in women's singles; and Isabella Gamez and Aleksandr Korovin, the 2023 Philippine champions in pair skating

=== Men's singles ===
Men's event medalists
Season	Location	Gold	Silver	Bronze	Ref.
2000–01	Las Piñas	Michael Novales	Dale Feliciano	No other competitors	
2001–02	Las Piñas	Jerico Lim	Dale Feliciano	No other competitors	
2002–03	Las Piñas	Dale Feliciano	John Solanzo	Ronan Capili	
2003–08	No men's competitors				
2008–09	Pasay	Michael Dimalanta	No other competitors		
2009–10	Pasay	Dikki John Martinez	No other competitors		
2010–11	Pasay	Clint Maverik Eguia	No other competitors		
2011–12	Pasay	Christopher Caluza	Clint Maverik Eguia	No other competitors	
2012–13	Pasay	Christopher Caluza	Clint Maverik Eguia	Michael Christian Martinez	
2013–14	Pasay	Christopher Caluza	Clint Maverik Eguia	No other competitors	
2014–16	Pasay	No men's competitors			
2016–17	Mandaluyong	Michael Christian Martinez	No other competitors		
2017–18	Pasay	Yamato Rowe	No other competitors		
2018–19	Pasay	Edrian Paul Celestino	Christopher Caluza	Yamato Rowe	
2019–20	Competition cancelled due to the 2019 Southeast Asian Games				
2020–22	Competitions cancelled due to the COVID-19 pandemic				
2022–23	Pasay	Edrian Paul Celestino	No other competitors		
2023–24	Pasay	Paolo Borromeo	Henry Privett-Mendoza	No other competitors	
2024–25	Pasay	Paolo Borromeo	No other competitors		
2025–26	Pasay	Paolo Borromeo	Brandon Baldoz	No other competitors	

=== Women's singles ===
Women's event medalists
Season	Location	Gold	Silver	Bronze	Ref.
2000–01	Las Piñas	Ina Feleo	Francesca Laureano	Kilani DeWit	
2001–02	Las Piñas	Francesca Laureano	Kilani DeWit	Leah Felipe	
2002–03	Las Piñas	Francesca Laureano	Kilani DeWit	No other competitors	
2003–04	Las Piñas	Francesca Laureano	Kilani DeWit	No other competitors	
2004–08	No women's competitors				
2008–09	Pasay	Elizabeth Stern	No other competitors		
2009–10	Pasay	Mericien Venzon	Lauren Ko	Gracielle Tan	
2010–11	Pasay	Zhaira Costiniano	Mericien Venzon	Mary Grace Baldo	
2011–12	Pasay	Melissa Bulanhagui	Zhaira Costiniano	Mericien Venzon	
2012–13	Pasay	Melissa Bulanhagui	Zhaira Costiniano	No other competitors	
2013–14	Pasay	Alisson Perticheto	Jizelle Bacani	No other competitors	
2014–15	Pasay	Frances Untalan	No other competitors		
2015–16	Pasay	Frances Untalan	Samantha Cabiles	Shayanne Casapao	
2016–17	Mandaluyong	Alisson Perticheto	Samantha Cabiles	No other competitors	
2017–18	Pasay	Alisson Perticheto	Samantha Cabiles	No other competitors	
2018–19	Pasay	Cirinia Gillet	Louwee Shibata	No other competitors	
2019–20	Competition cancelled due to the 2019 Southeast Asian Games				
2020–22	Competitions cancelled due to the COVID-19 pandemic				
2022–23	Pasay	Sofia Frank	Charmaine Chua	Skye Patenia	
2023–24	Pasay	Sofia Frank	Charmaine Chua	Skye Patenia	
2024–25	Pasay	Maxine Bautista	Cathryn Limketkai	Sofia Frank	
2025–26	Pasay	Maxine Bautista	Cathryn Limketkai	Skye Patenia	

=== Pairs ===
Pairs event medalists
Season	Location	Gold	Silver	Bronze	Ref.
No pairs competitors prior to 2023–24
2023–24	Pasay	Isabella Gamez; Aleksandr Korovin	No other competitors		
No pairs competitors since 2023–24

== Junior medalists ==
=== Men's singles ===
Junior men's event medalists
Season	Location	Gold	Silver	Bronze	Ref.
2000–01	Las Piñas	Paulo de Leon	Abraham Domdom	No other competitors	
2001–02	Las Piñas	Ronan Capili	Paulo de Leon	No other competitors	
2002–03	Las Piñas	No junior men's competitors			
2003–04	Las Piñas	Abraham Domdom	Neptali Gonzales III	No other competitors	
2004–05	Las Piñas	No junior men's competitors			
2005–06	Pasay	John Solanzo	No other competitors		
2006–07	Pasay	Dikki John Martinez	John Minas	Mark Muldez	
2007–08	Pasay	Dikki John Martinez	John Minas	No other competitors	
2008–09	Pasay	Dikki John Martinez	John Minas	No other competitors	
2009–10	Pasay	John Minas	No other competitors		
2010–13	Pasay	No junior men's competitors			
2013–14	Pasay	Jules Alpe	No other competitors		
2014–15	Pasay	Jules Alpe	No other competitors		
2015–16	Pasay	Jules Alpe	No other competitors		
2016–17	Mandaluyong	Yamato Rowe	Jules Alpe	No other competitors	
2017–19	Pasay	No junior men's competitors			
2019–20	Competition cancelled due to the 2019 Southeast Asian Games				
2020–22	Competitions cancelled due to the COVID-19 pandemic				
2022–23	Pasay	No junior men's competitors			
2023–24	Pasay	Betrand Zuriel	No other competitors		
2024–25	Pasay	Brandon Baldoz	No other competitors		
2025–26	Pasay	No junior men's competitors			

=== Women's singles ===
Junior women's event medalists
Season	Location	Gold	Silver	Bronze	Ref.
2000–01	Las Piñas	Ronna Capili	Lemair Quilet	No other competitors	
2001–02	Las Piñas	Lemair Quilet	No other competitors		
2002–03	Las Piñas	Maria Susana Quibol	No other competitors		
2003–04	Las Piñas	Ramina Palaca	No other competitors		
2004–05	Las Piñas	Ramina Palaca	No other competitors		
2005–06	Pasay	Ana Transporte	Carmen Damian	No other competitors	
2006–07	Pasay	Anne Roman	Mary Grace Baldo	Maria Jessica Cabili	
2007–08	Pasay	Mary Grace Baldo	No other competitors		
2008–09	Pasay	Katherine Dano	No other competitors		
2009–10	Pasay	Zhaira Costiniano	Carmen Damian	Maria Jessica Cabili	
2010–11	Pasay	No junior women's competitors			
2011–12	Pasay	Alisson Perticheto	Samantha Veloso	Patrcia Buensuceso	
2012–13	Pasay	Alisson Perticheto	Kelsea Suarez	Samantha Cabiles	
2013–14	Pasay	Frances Untalan	Samantha Cabiles	Alyssa Cornia	
2014–15	Pasay	Samantha Cabiles	Louwee Shibata	Sabine Katigbak	
2015–16	Pasay	No junior women's competitors			
2016–17	Mandaluyong	Sofia Guidote	Elia Mendoza	Buffy Cloma	
2017–18	Pasay	Sofia Guidote	Diane Panlilio	Elia Mendoza	
2018–19	Pasay	Sofia Guidote	Diane Panlilio	Skye Patenia	
2019–20	Competition cancelled due to the 2019 Southeast Asian Games				
2020–22	Competitions cancelled due to the COVID-19 pandemic				
2022–23	Pasay	Cathryn Limketkai	Hayden Balucating	Felicity Eco	
2023–24	Pasay	Cathryn Limketkai	Hayden Balucating	Kate Orrock	
2024–25	Pasay	Lillianna Fish	Isabella Hazelton	Samantha Mascarinas	
2025–26	Pasay	Hayden Balucating	Isabella Hazelton	Samantha Mascarinas	

=== Pairs ===
Junior pairs event medalists
Season	Location	Gold	Silver	Bronze	Ref.
No junior pairs competitors prior to 2011–12
2011–12	Pasay	Carlotta Powers; David Powers	No other competitors		
2012–17	No junior pairs competitors				
2017–18	Pasay	Cirinia Gillett; Zachary Freedman	No other competitors		
2018–19	Pasay	Cirinia Gillett; Zachary Freedman	No other competitors		
No junior pairs competitors since 2018–19

== 2025 Invitational ==
From 6 to 8 November 2025, the Philippine Skating Union hosted an international event in Pasay, which also served as the Philippines' national championships.

2025–26 international medalists
Discipline	Gold	Silver	Bronze
Senior men	(Philippines) Brandon Baldoz	(South Korea) Choi Yeh-wang	(South Korea) Choi Ye-chang
Senior women	(Philippines) Maxine Bautista	(Philippines) Cathryn Limketkai	(United States) Sasha Giammarco
Junior men	(Indonesia) Rafif Putra	No other competitors	
Junior women	(Philippines) Hayden Balucating	(Malaysia) Oh Wei Xuan	(Philippines) Isabella Hazelton
