= 2024 Four Continents Figure Skating Championships =

International figure skating competition

2024 Four Continents Championships
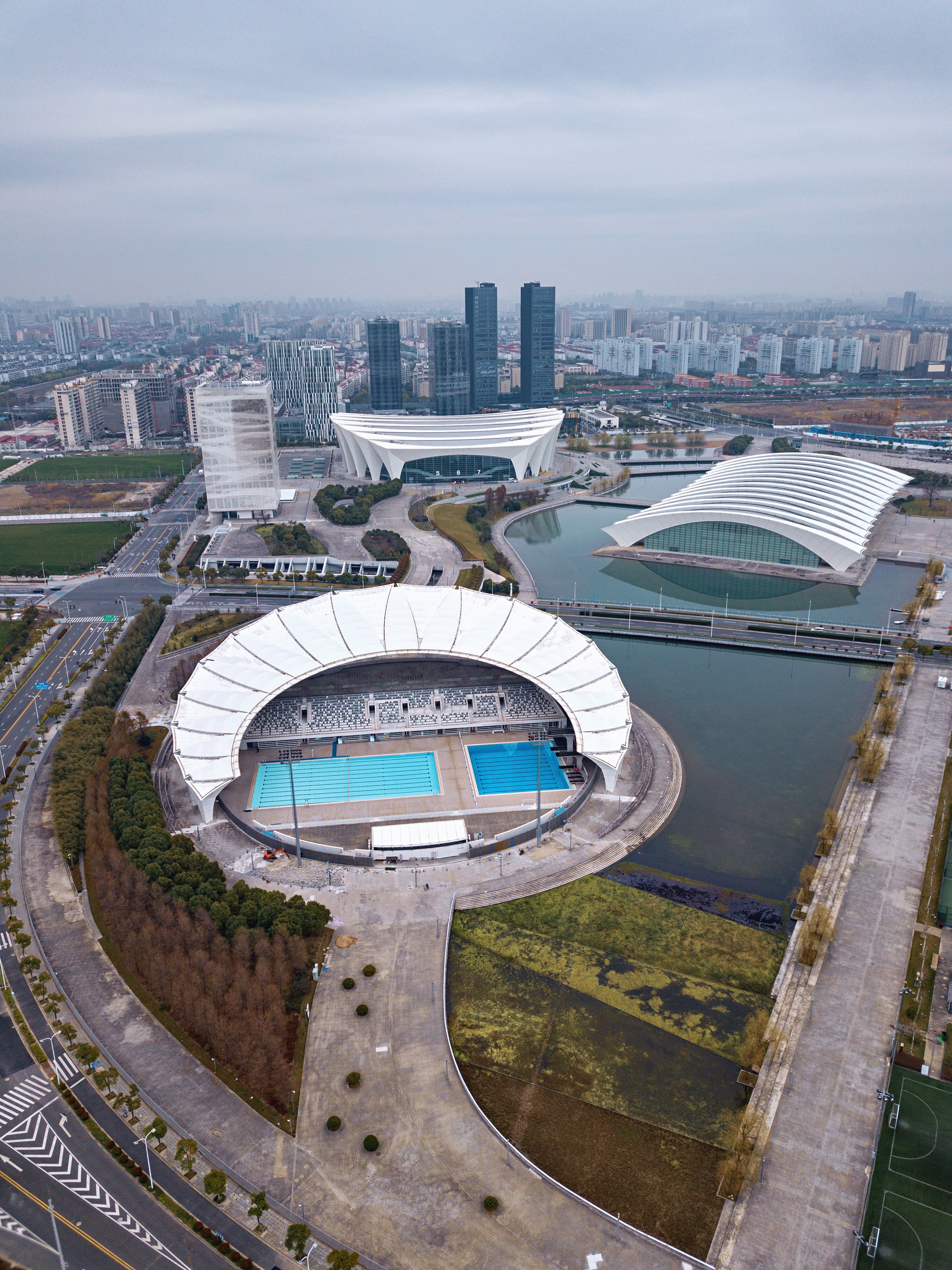
- Shanghai Oriental Sports Center
- Type: ISU Championship
- Date: January 30 – February 4
- Season: 2023–24
- Location: Shanghai, China
- Host: Chinese Skating Association
- Venue: Shanghai Oriental Sports Center

Champions
- Men's singles: (Japan) Yuma Kagiyama
- Women's singles: (Japan) Mone Chiba
- Pairs: (Canada) Deanna Stellato-Dudek and Maxime Deschamps
- Ice dance: (Canada) Piper Gilles and Paul Poirier
- Previous: 2023 Four Continents Championships
- Next: 2025 Four Continents Championships

The 2024 Four Continents Figure Skating Championships were held from January 30 to February 4, 2024, at the Shanghai Oriental Sports Center in Shanghai, China. Medals were awarded in men's singles, women's singles, pair skating, and ice dance.

== Qualification ==
Nations from non-European countries were able to send three entries at most for each discipline.

=== Age and minimum TES requirements ===
The competition was open to skaters from all non-European member nations of the International Skating Union. The corresponding competition for European skaters was the 2024 European Championships.

Skaters were eligible for the 2024 Four Continents Championships if they turned 16 years of age before July 1, 2023, and met the minimum technical elements score requirements. The ISU accepted scores if they were obtained at senior-level ISU-recognized international competitions during the ongoing season at least 21 days before the first official practice day of the championships or during the two preceding seasons.

Minimum technical scores
Discipline	SP/RD	FS/FD
Men	28	46
Women	25	42
Pairs	25	42
Ice dance	30	48

- SP/RD and FS/FD scores could be attained at different events.

== Schedule ==
Schedule
Date	Disc.	Time	Segment
Thursday, February 1	Women	7:00	Short program
Thursday, February 1	Men	9:30	Short program
Thursday, February 1	Pairs	12:30	Short program
Thursday, February 1	—N/a	15:15	Opening ceremony
Friday, February 2	Ice dance	6:45	Rhythm dance
Friday, February 2	Women	9:05	Free skate
Saturday, February 3	Pairs	7:30	Free skate
Saturday, February 3	Men	9:20	Free skate
Sunday, February 4	Ice dance	6:15	Free dance
Sunday, February 4	—N/a	8:45	Exhibition

- All times are listed in local time (UTC+08:00).

== Entries ==
Member nations began announcing their selections in December 2023. The International Skating Union published a semi-complete list of entries on January 10, 2024. A notation was made that the entries from Canada would be announced on January 14.

Entries
Country	Men	Women	Pairs	Ice dance
Australia	Charlton Doherty	Maria Chernyshova	Anastasiia Golubeva; Hektor Giotopoulos Moore	Holly Harris; Jason Chan
Australia	Darian Kaptich	Vlada Vasiliev	—N/a	India Nette; Eron Westwood
Brazil	—N/a			Natalia Pallu-Neves; Jayin Panesar
Canada	Wesley Chiu	Sara-Maude Dupuis	Kelly Ann Laurin; Loucas Éthier	Laurence Fournier Beaudry; Nikolaj Sørensen
Canada	Conrad Orzel	Justine Miclette	Lia Pereira; Trennt Michaud	Piper Gilles; Paul Poirier
Canada	Roman Sadovsky	Madeline Schizas	Deanna Stellato-Dudek; Maxime Deschamps	Marie-Jade Lauriault; Romain Le Gac
China	Chen Yudong	Chen Hongyi	Peng Cheng; Wang Lei	Chen Xizi; Xing Jianing
China	Dai Daiwei	Cheng Jiaying	Wang Yuchen; Zhu Lei	Li Xuantong; Wang Xinkang
China	Jin Boyang	Zhu Yi	Zhang Siyang; Yang Yongchao	Shi Shang; Wu Nan
Chinese Taipei	Lin Fang-Yi	Amanda Hsu	—N/a	
Chinese Taipei	—N/a	Ting Tzu-Han	—N/a	
Hong Kong	Yuen Lap Kan	Chow Hiu Yau	—N/a	
Hong Kong	Zhao Heung Lai	Joanna So	—N/a	
Japan	Yuma Kagiyama	Mone Chiba	Riku Miura; Ryuichi Kihara	Misato Komatsubara; Tim Koleto
Japan	Shun Sato	Mai Mihara	—N/a	Azusa Tanaka; Shingo Nishiyama
Japan	Sōta Yamamoto	Rinka Watanabe	—N/a	Utana Yoshida; Masaya Morita
Kazakhstan	Rakhat Bralin	Sofiya Farafonova	—N/a	
Kazakhstan	Dias Jirenbayev	Anna Levkovets	—N/a	
Kazakhstan	Mikhail Shaidorov	Nuriya Suleimen	—N/a	
Malaysia	Ze Zeng Fang	—N/a		
Mexico	Donovan Carrillo	Andrea Montesinos Cantú	—N/a	
Philippines	Edrian Paul Celestino	Sofia Frank	Isabella Gamez; Alexander Korovin	—N/a
Singapore	Pagiel Yie Ken Sng	—N/a		
South Korea	Cha Jun-hwan	Kim Chae-yeon	—N/a	Hannah Lim; Ye Quan
South Korea	Cha Young-hyun	Lee Hae-in	—N/a	—N/a
South Korea	Lim Ju-heon	Wi Seo-yeong	—N/a	—N/a
United States	Tomoki Hiwatashi	Elyce Lin-Gracey	Ellie Kam; Danny O'Shea	Christina Carreira; Anthony Ponomarenko
United States	Maxim Naumov	Lindsay Thorngren	Chelsea Liu; Balázs Nagy	Caroline Green; Michael Parsons
United States	Andrew Torgashev	Ava Marie Ziegler	Valentina Plazas; Maximiliano Fernandez	Emilea Zingas; Vadym Kolesnik

=== Changes to preliminary assignments ===
Date	Discipline	Withdrew	Added	Reason	Ref.
January 19	Ice dance	(Canada); Marjorie Lajoie; Zachary Lagha	(Canada); Marie-Jade Lauriault; Romain Le Gac	Injury (Lajoie)	
January 20	Ice dance	(Kazakhstan); Gaukhar Nauryzova; Boyisangur Datiev	—N/a		
January 27	Women	(United States); Amber Glenn	(United States); Elyce Lin-Gracey	Preparation for the 2024 World Championships	
January 28	Men	(United States); Camden Pulkinen	(United States); Maxim Naumov	Preparation for the 2024 World Championships	
January 28	Ice dance	(United States); Madison Chock; Evan Bates	(United States); Emilea Zingas; Vadym Kolesnik	Preparation for the 2024 World Championships	
January 29	Women	(India); Tara Prasad	—N/a	Low blood pressure	

== Medal summary ==
=== Medalists ===
Medals awarded to the skaters who achieved the highest overall placements in each discipline:

Discipline	Gold	Silver	Bronze
Men	(Japan); Yuma Kagiyama	(Japan); Shun Sato	(South Korea); Cha Jun-hwan
Women	(Japan); Mone Chiba	(South Korea); Kim Chae-yeon	(Japan); Rinka Watanabe
Pairs	(Canada); Deanna Stellato-Dudek; Maxime Deschamps	(Japan); Riku Miura; Ryuichi Kihara	(United States); Ellie Kam; Danny O'Shea
Ice dance	(Canada); Piper Gilles; Paul Poirier	(Canada); Laurence Fournier Beaudry; Nikolaj Sørensen	(United States); Christina Carreira; Anthony Ponomarenko

Small medals awarded to the skaters who achieved the highest short program or rhythm dance placements in each discipline:

Discipline	Gold	Silver	Bronze
Men	(Japan); Yuma Kagiyama	(Japan); Shun Sato	(South Korea); Cha Jun-hwan
Women	(Japan); Mone Chiba	(South Korea); Kim Chae-yeon	(United States); Ava Marie Ziegler
Pairs	(Canada); Deanna Stellato-Dudek; Maxime Deschamps	(Japan); Riku Miura; Ryuichi Kihara	(United States); Chelsea Liu; Balázs Nagy
Ice dance	(Canada); Piper Gilles; Paul Poirier	(Canada); Laurence Fournier Beaudry; Nikolaj Sørensen	(United States); Christina Carreira; Anthony Ponomarenko

Small medals awarded to the skaters who achieved the highest free skating or free dance placements in each discipline:

Discipline	Gold	Silver	Bronze
Men	(Japan); Yuma Kagiyama	(South Korea); Cha Jun-hwan	(Japan); Shun Sato
Women	(Japan); Mone Chiba	(Japan); Rinka Watanabe	(South Korea); Kim Chae-yeon
Pairs	(Canada); Deanna Stellato-Dudek; Maxime Deschamps	(United States); Ellie Kam; Danny O'Shea	(Japan); Riku Miura; Ryuichi Kihara
Ice dance	(Canada); Piper Gilles; Paul Poirier	(Canada); Laurence Fournier Beaudry; Nikolaj Sørensen	(Canada); Marie-Jade Lauriault; Romain Le Gac

=== Medals by country ===
Table of medals for overall placement:

Rank	Nation	Gold	Silver	Bronze	Total
1	Japan	2	2	1	5
2	Canada	2	1	0	3
3	South Korea	0	1	1	2
4	United States	0	0	2	2
Totals (4 entries)		4	4	4	12

== Results ==
=== Men's singles ===
Men's results
Rank	Skater	Nation	Total	SP		FS	
1st place, gold medalist(s)	Yuma Kagiyama	Japan	307.58	1	106.82	1	200.76
2nd place, silver medalist(s)	Shun Sato	Japan	274.59	2	99.20	3	175.39
3rd place, bronze medalist(s)	Cha Jun-hwan	South Korea	272.95	3	95.30	2	177.65
4	Sōta Yamamoto	Japan	263.43	4	94.44	4	168.99
5	Jin Boyang	China	256.89	5	89.41	5	167.48
6	Mikhail Shaidorov	Kazakhstan	244.80	7	81.76	6	163.04
7	Wesley Chiu	Canada	240.38	6	83.50	7	156.88
8	Andrew Torgashev	United States	237.20	8	81.15	8	156.05
9	Chen Yudong	China	218.66	9	78.74	13	139.92
10	Roman Sadovsky	Canada	217.83	11	72.44	10	145.39
11	Tomoki Hiwatashi	United States	217.74	10	75.39	11	142.35
12	Maxim Naumov	United States	215.00	15	67.61	9	147.39
13	Lim Ju-heon	South Korea	211.40	13	70.27	12	141.13
14	Cha Young-hyun	South Korea	204.14	12	72.43	15	131.71
15	Donovan Carrillo	Mexico	202.47	14	67.66	14	134.81
16	Dias Jirenbayev	Kazakhstan	195.88	18	64.51	16	131.37
17	Conrad Orzel	Canada	194.92	17	65.07	17	129.85
18	Edrian Paul Celestino	Philippines	180.31	20	62.86	18	117.45
19	Rakhat Bralin	Kazakhstan	177.89	19	63.17	19	114.72
20	Dai Daiwei	China	168.51	16	66.04	22	102.47
21	Darian Kaptich	Australia	166.41	22	55.76	20	110.65
22	Ze Zeng Fang	Malaysia	158.34	23	54.99	21	103.35
23	Zhao Heung Lai	Hong Kong	149.05	21	60.06	24	88.99
24	Yuen Lap Kan	Hong Kong	147.16	24	54.05	23	93.11
25	Pagiel Yie Ken Sng	Singapore	51.12	25	51.12	Did not advance to free skate	
26	Lin Fang-yi	Chinese Taipei	48.85	26	48.85	Did not advance to free skate	
27	Charlton Doherty	Australia	42.28	27	42.28	Did not advance to free skate	

=== Women's singles ===
Women's results
Rank	Skater	Nation	Total	SP		FS	
1st place, gold medalist(s)	Mone Chiba	Japan	214.98	1	71.10	1	143.88
2nd place, silver medalist(s)	Kim Chae-yeon	South Korea	204.68	2	69.77	3	134.91
3rd place, bronze medalist(s)	Rinka Watanabe	Japan	202.17	4	67.22	2	134.95
4	Ava Marie Ziegler	United States	201.19	3	68.25	4	132.94
5	Wi Seo-yeong	South Korea	193.57	6	64.44	5	129.13
6	Madeline Schizas	Canada	185.69	9	61.57	6	124.12
7	Mai Mihara	Japan	184.07	5	65.18	7	118.89
8	Elyce Lin-Gracey	United States	173.98	8	62.83	11	111.15
9	Sara-Maude Dupuis	Canada	172.45	12	56.00	8	116.45
10	Ting Tzu-Han	Chinese Taipei	171.87	10	59.17	10	112.70
11	Lee Hae-in	South Korea	169.38	11	56.07	9	113.31
12	Lindsay Thorngren	United States	162.63	7	64.11	12	98.52
13	Chen Hongyi	China	153.96	13	55.97	14	97.99
14	Justine Miclette	Canada	151.30	14	52.93	13	98.37
15	Andrea Montesinos Cantú	Mexico	143.24	16	50.86	16	92.38
16	Zhu Yi	China	139.52	15	52.77	19	86.75
17	Sofiya Farafonova	Kazakhstan	137.79	18	47.57	18	90.22
18	Cheng Jiaying	China	135.29	22	41.77	15	93.52
19	Sofia Lexi Jacqueline Frank	Philippines	134.79	21	42.43	17	92.36
20	Joanna So	Hong Kong	132.93	17	50.07	20	82.86
21	Maria Chernyshova	Australia	121.64	20	43.29	21	78.35
22	Nuriya Suleimen	Kazakhstan	115.98	19	45.69	23	70.29
23	Anna Levkovets	Kazakhstan	112.07	24	39.56	22	72.51
24	Amanda Hsu	Chinese Taipei	105.66	23	39.60	24	66.06
25	Chow Hiu Yau	Hong Kong	39.54	25	39.54	Did not advance to free skate	
26	Vlada Vasiliev	Australia	32.63	26	32.63	Did not advance to free skate	

=== Pairs ===
Pairs' results
Rank	Team	Nation	Total	SP		FS	
1st place, gold medalist(s)	Deanna Stellato-Dudek; Maxime Deschamps	Canada	198.80	1	69.48	1	129.32
2nd place, silver medalist(s)	Riku Miura; Ryuichi Kihara	Japan	190.77	2	65.61	3	125.16
3rd place, bronze medalist(s)	Ellie Kam; Danny O'Shea	United States	187.28	4	60.72	2	126.56
4	Anastasia Golubeva; Hektor Giotopoulos Moore	Australia	183.83	7	58.79	4	125.04
5	Lia Pereira; Trennt Michaud	Canada	182.05	6	59.89	5	122.16
6	Peng Cheng; Wang Lei	China	180.22	5	60.18	6	120.04
7	Chelsea Liu; Balázs Nagy	United States	175.85	3	61.90	8	113.95
8	Kelly Ann Laurin; Loucas Éthier	Canada	174.47	8	58.50	7	115.97
9	Valentina Plazas; Maximiliano Fernandez	United States	161.16	9	57.38	9	103.78
10	Zhang Siyang; Yang Yongchao	China	157.32	10	55.70	10	101.62
11	Isabella Gamez; Alexander Korovin	Philippines	142.86	12	49.79	11	93.07
12	Wang Yuchen; Zhu Lei	China	139.56	11	53.66	12	85.90

=== Ice dance ===
Ice dance results
Rank	Team	Nation	Total	RD		FD	
1st place, gold medalist(s)	Piper Gilles; Paul Poirier	Canada	214.36	1	85.49	1	128.87
2nd place, silver medalist(s)	Laurence Fournier Beaudry; Nikolaj Sørensen	Canada	207.54	2	82.02	2	125.52
3rd place, bronze medalist(s)	Christina Carreira; Anthony Ponomarenko	United States	194.14	3	77.47	5	116.67
4	Emilea Zingas; Vadym Kolesnik	United States	193.07	4	75.76	4	117.31
5	Marie-Jade Lauriault; Romain Le Gac	Canada	190.83	7	71.26	3	119.57
6	Caroline Green; Michael Parsons	United States	190.53	5	75.37	6	115.16
7	Hannah Lim; Ye Quan	South Korea	182.78	9	68.91	7	113.87
8	Misato Komatsubara; Tim Koleto	Japan	182.70	6	71.29	8	111.41
9	Holly Harris; Jason Chan	Australia	176.34	8	69.34	9	107.00
10	Utana Yoshida; Masaya Morita	Japan	166.13	10	62.86	10	103.27
11	Azusa Tanaka; Shingo Nishiyama	Japan	157.63	11	62.09	12	95.54
12	Chen Xizi; Xing Jianing	China	157.57	12	61.10	11	96.47
13	Shi Shang; Wu Nan	China	147.28	13	55.11	13	92.17
14	Natalia Pallu-Neves; Jayin Panesar	Brazil	135.97	15	50.59	15	85.38
15	India Nette; Eron Westwood	Australia	132.60	14	53.59	16	79.01
16	Li Xuantong; Wang Xinkang	China	132.42	16	46.48	14	85.94
