= Darian Kaptich =

Australian figure skater

Personal information
- Born: 6 October 2001 (age 24) Brisbane, Australia
- Height: 1.88 m (6 ft 2 in)

Figure skating career
- Country: Australia
- Discipline: Men's singles
- Coach: Maureen Sumner; David Kranjec
- Skating club: Boondall FSC Brisbane
- Began skating: 2007

Medal record
Australian Championships
Gold medal – first place	2022–23 Brisbane	Singles
Gold medal – first place	2023–24 Erina	Singles
Gold medal – first place	2024–25 Melbourne	Singles
Bronze medal – third place	2019–20 Melbourne	Singles

Darian Kaptich (born 6 October 2001) is an Australian figure skater. He is a three-time Australian national champion and the 2024 Oceania International champion.

== Personal life ==
Darian Kaptich was born in Brisbane, Australia.

== Career ==
=== Early years ===
Kaptich began learning how to skate in 2007. He was first coached by Hui Ma before Maureen Sumner became his head coach.

On the junior level, he won the 2013–14, 2016–17, and 2017–18 Australian Junior Championships. He also competed at the 2020 World Junior Championships, where he finished in twenty-eighth place.

=== 2022–23 season ===
Kaptich started the season in August, placing fifth at the 2022 Philadelphia Summer Championships and eighth at the 2022 Cranberry Cup International. In November, he won his first senior national title at the 2022–23 Australian Championships.

Kaptich was subsequently selected to compete at the 2023 Four Continents Championships in Colorado Springs, Colorado, United States, where he finished eighteenth overall.

=== 2023–24 season ===
Kaptich began the season by winning the bronze medal at the 2023 Asian Open Trophy. A couple months later, he won his second consecutive national title at the 2023–24 Australian Championships. He subsequently went on to compete at the 2024 Four Continents Championships in Shanghai, China.

He then finished the season by winning gold at the 2024 Oceania International.

=== 2024–25 season ===
In November, at the 2024–25 Australian Championships, Kaptich placed first in the short program and free skate, winning his third consecutive national title. Selected to compete at the 2025 Four Continents Championships in Seoul, South Korea, Kaptich finished the event in eighteenth place.

== Programs ==
Season	Short program	Free skate	Ref.
2015–16	Classic Drum Battle; Marching Band Medley By A & T Drumline Choreo. by Maureen Sumner	Bennie and the Jets; Rocket Man; I'm Still Standing By Elton John Choreo. by Kristian Ryan	
2017–18	In the Mood; Boogie Woogie Maxine	Man in the Mirror By Michael Jackson Choreo. by Maureen Sumner	
2018–19	Rise of Darkrai By Shinji Miyazaki Choreo. by Maureen Sumner	Man in the Mirror By Michael Jackson Choreo. by Maureen Sumner	
2019–20	I Swear By Gary Baker and Frank J. Myers Choreo. by Maureen Sumner	It's a Man's Man's Man's World; I Got You (I Feel Good) By James Brown Choreo. by Maureen Sumner	
2021–22	I Wish By Stevie Wonder Choreo. by Maureen Sumner	The Way You Look Tonight By Dorothy Fields and Jerome Kern Performed by Frank Sinatra, Choreo. by Maureen Sumner; L-O-V-E by By Bert Kaempfert and Milt Gabler Performed by Nat King Cole Choreo. by Maureen Sumner	
2022–23	Friend Like Me By Ne-Yo Choreo. by Vashti Lonsdale	The Way You Look Tonight By Dorothy Fields and Jerome Kern Performed by Frank Sinatra, Choreo. by Maureen Sumner; L-O-V-E by By Bert Kaempfert and Milt Gabler Performed by Nat King Cole Choreo. by Maureen Sumner	
2023–24	Friend Like Me By Ne-Yo Choreo. by Vashti Lonsdale	Unsteady By X Ambassadors Choreo. by Vashti Lonsdale	
2024–25	Everybody By Denniz Pop and Max Martin Performed by Backstreet Boys Choreo. by Vashti Lonsdale	Unsteady By X Ambassadors Choreo. by Vashti Lonsdale	

== Competitive highlights ==
- JGP – Event of the ISU Junior Grand Prix Series
- TBD – Assigned
- WD – Withdrew from competition

Competition placements at senior level
Season	2018–19	2019–20	2021–22	2022–23	2023–24	2024–25
Four Continents				18th	21st	18th
Australian Championships	5th	3rd		1st	1st	1st
Asian Open					3rd	
Autumn Talents Cup			4th			
Cranberry Cup				8th		
Oceania International					1st	
Philadelphia Summer				5th		
Trophée Métropole Nice			14th			

Competition placements at junior level
Season	2012–13	2013–14	2014–15	2015–16	2016–17	2017–18	2018–19	2019–20
World Junior Championships								28th
Australian Championships	2nd	1st	2nd	3rd	2nd	1st	1st	
JGP Australia						11th		
JGP Austria							14th	
JGP Spain				22nd				
JGP Latvia						21st		
JGP United States								12th
Asian Open				8th		7th		
FBMA Trophy				3rd				
Hellmut Seibt Memorial				13th				
Philadelphia Summer								3rd
Reykjavík International Games							1st	
Sportland Trophy				3rd				

== Detailed results ==
ISU personal best scores in the +5/-5 GOE System
Segment	Type	Score	Event
Total	TSS	166.41	2024 Four Continents Championships
Short program	TSS	58.22	2023 Four Continents Championships
Short program	TES	28.94	2023 Four Continents Championships
Short program	PCS	29.58	2024 Four Continents Championships
Free skating	TSS	110.65	2024 Four Continents Championships
Free skating	TES	55.67	2024 Four Continents Championships
Free skating	PCS	57.90	2023 Four Continents Championships

=== Senior level ===
Results in the 2018–19 season
Date	Event	SP		FS		Total	
Date	Event	P	Score	P	Score	P	Score
Nov 30 – Dec 7, 2018	(Australia) 2018–19 Australian Championships	6	47.99	5	108.95	5	156.94

Results in the 2019–20 season
Date	Event	SP		FS		Total	
Date	Event	P	Score	P	Score	P	Score
Nov 29 – Dec 6, 2019	(Australia) 2019–20 Australian Championships	4	60.76	3	112.35	3	173.11

Results in the 2021–22 season
Date	Event	SP		FS		Total	
Date	Event	P	Score	P	Score	P	Score
Oct 20–24, 2021	(France) 2021 Trophée Métropole Nice Côte d'Azur	12	57.92	19	99.16	14	157.08
Oct 27–30, 2021	(Ukraine) 2021 Autumn Talents Cup	2	60.31	4	107.92	4	168.23

Results in the 2022–23 season
Date	Event	SP		FS		Total	
Date	Event	P	Score	P	Score	P	Score
Aug 4–7, 2022	(United States) 2022 Philadelphia Summer International	6	60.12	3	122.49	5	182.61
Aug 9–14, 2022	(United States) 2022 Cranberry Cup International	8	57.03	8	108.30	8	165.33
Nov 25 – Dec 2, 2022	(Australia) 2022–23 Australian Championships	1	64.50	1	115.06	1	179.56
Feb 7–12, 2023	(United States) 2023 Four Continents Championships	17	58.22	17	107.91	18	166.13

Results in the 2023–24 season
Date	Event	SP		FS		Total	
Date	Event	P	Score	P	Score	P	Score
Aug 16–19, 2023	(Thailand) 2023 Asian Open Trophy	4	58.62	2	124.51	3	183.13
Dec 1–8, 2023	(Australia) 2023–24 Australian Championships	1	61.45	1	113.92	1	175.37
Jan 30 – Feb 4, 2024	(China) 2024 Four Continents Championships	22	55.76	20	110.65	21	166.41
May 29–31, 2024	(Australia) 2024 Oceania International	1	46.22	1	95.17	1	141.39

Results in the 2024–25 season
Date	Event	SP		FS		Total	
Date	Event	P	Score	P	Score	P	Score
Nov 29 – Dec 6, 2024	(Australia) 2024–25 Australian Championships	1	61.38	1	125.67	1	187.05
Feb 19–23, 2025	(South Korea) 2025 Four Continents Championships	18	56.60	17	119.07	18	175.67

=== Junior level ===
Results in the 2012–13 season
Date	Event	SP		FS		Total	
Date	Event	P	Score	P	Score	P	Score
Dec 1–7, 2012	(Australia) 2012–13 Australian Championships	2	31.07	1	72.88	2	103.95

Results in the 2013–14 season
Date	Event	SP		FS		Total	
Date	Event	P	Score	P	Score	P	Score
Nov 30 – Dec 6, 2013	(Australia) 2013–14 Australian Championships	1	47.27	1	81.87	1	129.14

Results in the 2014–15 season
Date	Event	SP		FS		Total	
Date	Event	P	Score	P	Score	P	Score
Nov 28 – Dec 5, 2014	(Australia) 2014–15 Australian Championships	3	41.07	1	98.00	2	139.07

Results in the 2015–16 season
Date	Event	SP		FS		Total	
Date	Event	P	Score	P	Score	P	Score
Aug 16–19, 2015	(Thailand) 2015 Asian Open Trophy	9	31.29	8	59.04	8	90.33
Sep 30 – Oct 4, 2015	2015 JGP Spain	21	36.57	22	64.62	22	101.19
Nov 28 – Dec 4, 2015	(Australia) 2015–16 Australian Championships	3	45.83	4	88.21	3	134.04
Jan 21–23, 2016	(United Arab Emirates) 2016 FBMA Trophy	3	46.18	1	90.42	3	136.60
Feb 23–27, 2016	(Austria) 2016 Hellmut Seibt Memorial	9	44.88	13	71.63	13	116.51
Mar 2–6, 2016	(Hungary) 2016 Sportland Trophy	3	40.99	3	76.89	3	117.88

Results in the 2016–17 season
Date	Event	SP		FS		Total	
Date	Event	P	Score	P	Score	P	Score
Nov 25 – Dec 2, 2016	(Australia) 2016–17 Australian Championships	2	49.65	2	92.17	2	141.82

Results in the 2017–18 season
Date	Event	SP		FS		Total	
Date	Event	P	Score	P	Score	P	Score
Aug 2–5, 2017	(Hong Kong) 2017 Asian Open Trophy	6	35.48	7	69.63	7	105.11
Aug 23–26, 2017	2017 JGP Australia	11	49.99	11	89.24	11	139.23
Sep 6–9, 2017	2017 JGP Latvia	20	43.71	21	85.83	21	129.54
Dec 2–9, 2017	(Australia) 2017–18 Australian Championships	3	41.46	1	88.64	1	130.10

Results in the 2018–19 season
Date	Event	SP		FS		Total	
Date	Event	P	Score	P	Score	P	Score
Aug 29 – Sep 1, 2018	2018 JGP Austria	16	42.42	14	88.16	14	130.58
Nov 30 – Dec 7, 2018	(Australia) 2018–19 Australian Championships	1	47.20	1	86.29	1	133.49
Feb 1–3, 2019	(Iceland) 2019 Reykjavik International Games	1	49.42	1	85.38	1	134.80

Results in the 2019–20 season
Date	Event	SP		FS		Total	
Date	Event	P	Score	P	Score	P	Score
Jul 29 – Aug 3, 2019	(United States) 2019 Philadelphia Summer International	4	52.23	3	100.03	3	152.26
Aug 28–31, 2019	2019 JGP United States	11	55.22	12	90.52	12	145.74
Mar 2–8, 2020	(Estonia) 2029 World Junior Championships	28	49.48	—N/a	—N/a	28	49.48
