= Zhaira Costiniano =

Filipino figure skater

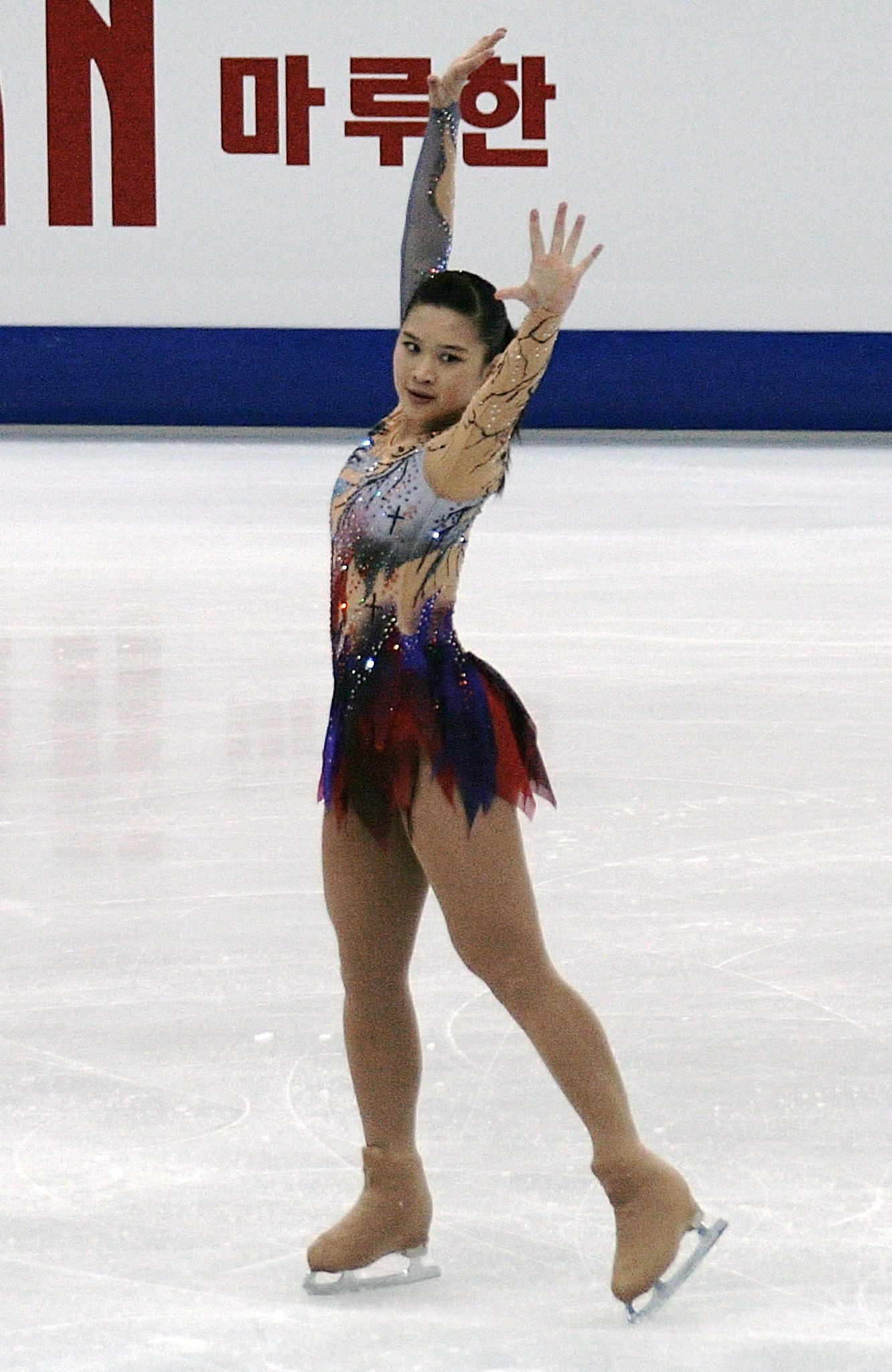
- Zhaira Costiniano

Personal information
- Full name: Zhaira Costiniano
- Born: November 30, 1995 (age 30) Manila, Philippines

Figure skating career
- Country: Philippines
- Coach: Alexei Letov

Zhaira Costiniano (born November 30, 1995, in Manila, Philippines) is a Filipino figure skater. She qualified to the free skate at the 2012 Four Continents Championships in Colorado Springs, Colorado. She is the 2009 junior ladies Philippine national champion and the 2010 senior ladies Philippine national champion. NW Asian Weekly named Costiniano among the top ten Asian-American sports figures in 2010.

Costiniano became the youngest lady to win the Philippine senior ladies title at age 15. She is also the first lady to win the Philippine junior and senior national titles in consecutive years. Costiniano represented the Philippines at the Junior World Championship in 2010 and 2011. She was the flag bearer for the Philippines at the 2011 Asian Winter Games held in Kazakhstan and placed 7th at the event.

== Programs ==
Season	Short program	Free skating
2011–2012	Take Five by Dave Brubeck	A Kalaidoscope of Mathematics by James Horner; Nostradamus by Maksim Mrvica
2010–2011	Take Five by Dave Brubeck	Schindler's List by John Williams
2009–2010	Within by William Joseph	Broken Sorrow by Nuttin But Strings

== Competitive highlights ==
International
Event	2009–10	2010–11	2011–12	2012–13
World Champ.			47th	
Four Continents Champ.			24th	
Asian Winter Games		7th		
International: Junior
World Junior Champ.	36th	18th PR		
JGP Turkey	21st			
National
Philippine Champ.	1st J.	1st	2nd	2nd
JGP = Junior Grand Prix; J. = Junior level; PR = Preliminary round
