= Mericien Venzon =

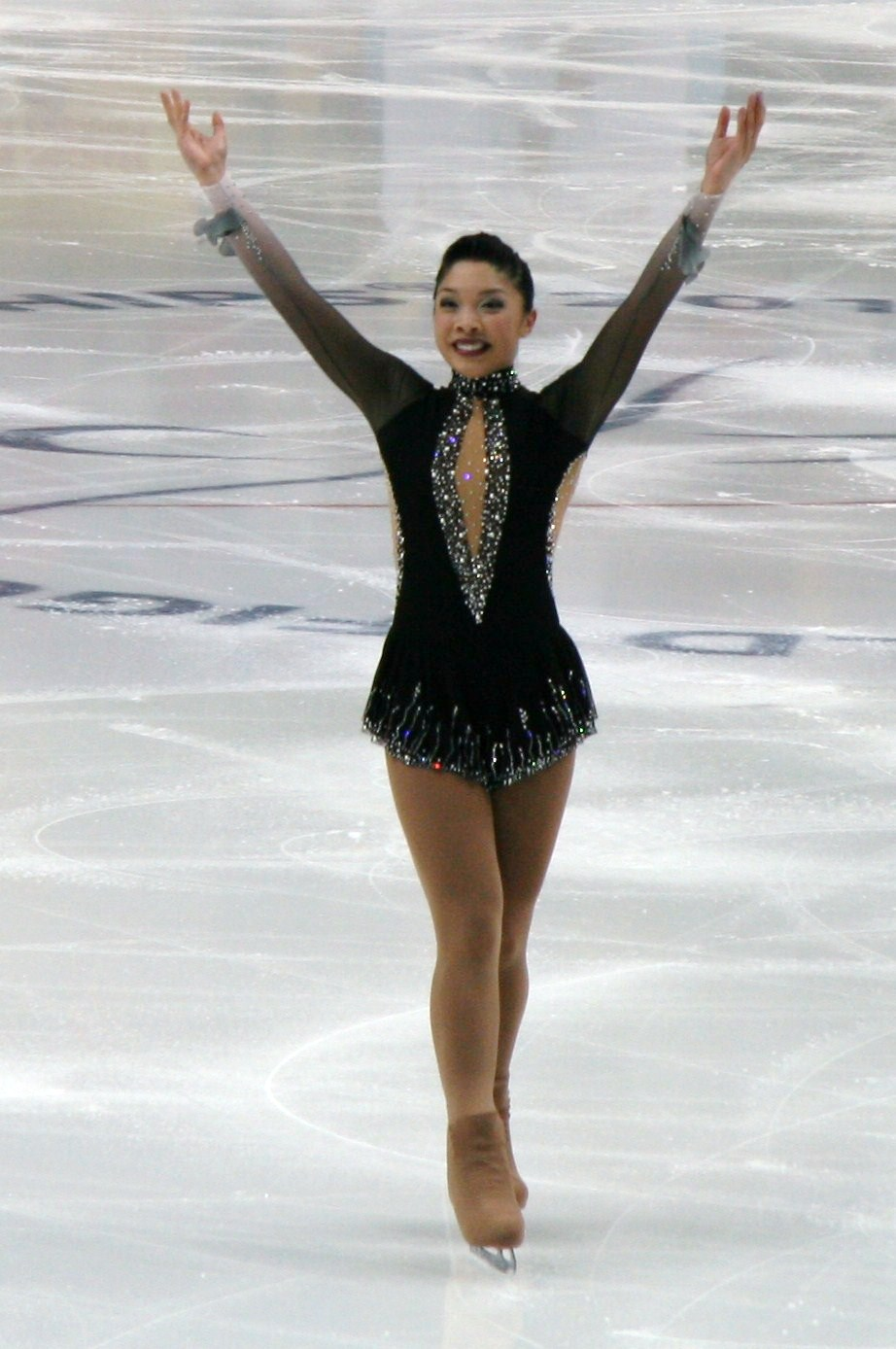
- Mericien Venzon at the 2011 World Figure Skating Championships

Personal information
- Full name: Mericien Venzon
- Born: August 22, 1991 (age 34) Hayward, CA
- Home town: Hayward, CA
- Height: 1.55 m (5 ft 1 in)

Figure skating career
- Country: Philippines
- Coach: Philip Diguglielmo

Mericien Venzon (born August 22, 1991) from Hayward, California, United States is a figure skater who represented the Philippines. She qualified to the free skate at the 2011 Four Continents Championships. She was the senior women's champion at the 2009 Philippine Figure Skating Championships.

== Personal life ==
Mericien Venzon was born in Hayward, California. She attended Moreau Catholic High School and graduated in the Class of 2009. She graduated from the University of California, Los Angeles, with highest distinctions. Currently, she is a fellow with the Society and Genetics Institute.

== Competitive highlights ==
| Event | 2009–10 | 2010–11 | 2011–12 |
|---|---|---|---|
| World Championships | | 35th | |
| Four Continents Championships | 24th | 22nd | 27th |
| Asian Winter Games | | 11th | |
| Nebelhorn Trophy | 27th | | |
| JGP SBC Cup (Japan) | | 23rd | |
| Philippine Championships | 1st | 2nd | 3rd |
JGP = Junior Grand Prix
