= Sofia Frank =

Filipino figure skater

Personal information
- Full name: Sofia Lexi Jacqueline Frank
- Born: October 6, 2005 (age 20) Los Angeles, California, U.S.
- Home town: Colorado Springs, Colorado, U.S.
- Height: 5 ft 5 in (1.64 m)

Figure skating career
- Country: Philippines (since 2021); United States (until 2021)
- Coach: Tammy Gambill; Damon Allen
- Skating club: Pasadena Figure Skating Club
- Began skating: 2009

Sofia Lexi Jacqueline Frank (born October 6, 2005) is a Filipino-American figure skater. She is a two time Philippine national (2023, 2024) champion and has competed in the free skate segment of the 2022 Four Continents Championships and the 2022 World Junior Figure Skating Championships.

== Early life and education ==
Sofia Lexi Jacqueline Frank was born on October 6, 2005, in Los Angeles, United States. She is the third child of former Filipino beauty queen Precious Tongko, who was crowned 1990 Binibining Pilipinas Maja International, and Noah Frank, an American. She has a sister, Natasha, who is 3 years younger than her.

Frank attends online classes at the elite athlete track program of Cheyenne Mountain High School.

== Career ==
=== Early years ===
Frank was introduced to skating at the age of three, with her family later moving to Colorado Springs, Colorado to be able to train at the World Arena.

=== 2021–2022 season ===
Having previously represented the United States, Frank began to compete for the Philippines in 2021.

At the 2021 CS Nebelhorn Trophy, Frank attempted but failed to qualify for the 2022 Winter Olympics, placing twenty-fourth overall. Her results allowed her to qualify for the 2022 Four Continents Championships.

In October, Frank placed eighteenth at the Finlandia Trophy, becoming the Philippines' highest scorer in the short program, free skate, and overall for a female skater. She scored 53.30 points in the short program and 94.79 points in the free skate for a total of 148.09 points. As a result, she broke the national record previously held by Alisson Perticheto, who had posted an overall score of 139.70 at the 2019 ISU Challenger Series Warsaw Cup. Frank then ranked fifth at the 2021 Tallinn Trophy the following month.

Competing at the junior level, Frank qualified for the 2022 World Junior Figure Skating Championshipsafter finishing thirteenth at the 15th Santa Claus Cup in Hungary.

In January, Frank participated at the 2022 Four Continents Championships in Tallinn, Estonia, where she placed sixteenth overall. She finished twenty-second at the 2022 World Junior Championships to end the season.

=== 2022–2023 season ===
Frank began the season by competing at the senior-level 2022 Philadelphia Summer International, where she placed tenth overall. She then participated in the 2022 U.S. Classic, finishing eleventh in the event.

Making her Junior Grand Prix (JGP) debut at the 2022 JGP Poland I, Frank placed sixteenth.

In December, Frank placed first in both the short program and free skate segments of the 2022 Asian Open Trophy in Jakarta, Indonesia, winning her first international competition. She shortly followed the victory with her first national title at the 2022 Philippine Figure Skating Championships.

At the 2023 World Junior Championships, Frank ranked forty-first in the short program. Since she did not place in the top twenty-fourth of the competition, she was not able to qualify for the free skate.

=== 2023–2024 season ===
Frank began the season with a ninth-place finish at the 2023 Asian Open Trophy. In the same month Frank competed at the 2023 JGP Bangkok where she placed nineteenth. In the next month, Frank participated in the 2023 Skate Canada Autumn Classic and ranked ninth overall.

In January, Frank competed at the 2024 Four Continents Figure Skating Championships where she placed nineteenth. In February, Frank competed at the 2024 World Junior Figure Skating Championships in Taipei, Taiwan, where she placed 45th out of 46 junior competitors in the short program. Her season abruptly ended as she did not qualify for the free skate program with only the top-24 junior women moving forward.

=== 2024–2025 season ===
Frank began the season with a first-place finish at the 2024 Southeast Asian Open Figure Skating Trophy. In November, she would go on to win the bronze medal at the 2025 Philippine Championships and finish seventeenth at the 2024 Santa Claus Cup.

In February, she finished nineteenth at the 2025 Four Continents Championships in Seoul, South Korea.

=== 2025–2026 season ===
Frank opened the season by finishing sixteenth at the 2025 Asian Open Trophy.

In November 2025, she stated her intention to step away from the sport temporarily in service of her mental health, recovery, and striking a work-life balance.

== Personal life ==
Adrian Tongko is Frank's uncle who is a snowboarder.

== Programs ==
Season	Short program	Free skating
2024–2025	Rumour Has It by Adele & Ryan Tedder choreo. by Joseph Klein	Moulin Rouge!; One Day I'll Fly Away performed by Nicole Kidman; The Show Must Go On performed by Nicole Kidman, Jim Broadbent choreo. by Catarina Lindgren
2023–2024	Who Do You Think You Are by Spice Girls choreo. by Drew Meekins	Moulin Rouge!; One Day I'll Fly Away performed by Nicole Kidman; The Show Must Go On performed by Nicole Kidman, Jim Broadbent choreo. by Catarina Lindgren
2022–2023	Jump (For My Love) by The Pointer Sisters choreo. by Drew Meekins	Moulin Rouge!; One Day I'll Fly Away performed by Nicole Kidman; The Show Must Go On performed by Nicole Kidman, Jim Broadbent choreo. by Catarina Lindgren
2021–2022	Last Dance by Donna Summer and Paul Jabra choreo. by Drew Meekins	Wedding Vow (from Romeo & Juliet) by Abel Korzeniowski choreo. by Ilona Melnichenko

== Competitive highlights ==
- JGP – Event of the ISU Junior Grand Prix Series
- CS – Event of the ISU Challenger Series
- TBD – Assigned
- WD – Withdrew from competition

Competition placements at senior level
Season	2021–22	2022–23	2023–24	2024–25	2025–26
Four Continents Championships	16th	WD	19th	19th	
Philippine Championships		1st	1st	3rd	
CS Autumn Classic			9th		
CS Finlandia Trophy	18th				
CS Nebelhorn Trophy	24th				
CS U.S. Classic		11th			
Asian Open Trophy		1st	9th		16th
Asian Winter Games				11th	
Philadelphia		10th			
SEA Open Trophy				1st	
Tallinn Trophy	5th				

Competition placements at junior level
Season	2021–22	2022–23	2023–24
World Junior Championships	22nd	41st	45th
JGP Poland I		16th	
JGP Thailand			19th
Santa Claus Cup	13th		

== Detailed results ==
ISU personal best scores in the +5/-5 GOE System
Segment	Type	Score	Event
Total	**TSS**	**148.09**	2021 CS Finlandia Trophy
Short program	**TSS**	**53.86**	2022 World Junior Championships
Short program	TES	29.21	2021 CS Finlandia Trophy
Short program	PCS	24.68	2022 World Junior Championships
Free skating	**TSS**	**94.79**	2021 CS Finlandia Trophy
Free skating	TES	48.97	2024 Four Continents Championships
Free skating	PCS	47.87	2021 CS Finlandia Trophy

Small medals for short and free programs awarded only at ISU Championships. ISU personal bests highlighted in bold.

2025–26 season
Date	Event	Level	SP	FS	Total
August 1–5, 2025	2025 Asian Open Trophy	Senior	11; 34.93	17; 53.14	16; 88.07
2024–25 season
Date	Event	Level	SP	FS	Total
February 19–23, 2025	2025 Four Continents Championships	Senior	20; 41.78	19; 73.61	19; 115.39
February 11–13, 2025	2025 Asian Winter Games	Senior	11; 43.55	12; 76.50	11; 120.05
November 27–December 2, 2024	2024 Santa Claus Cup	Senior	16; 37.42	18; 63.42	17; 100.84
November 7–8, 2024	2024 Philippine Championships	Senior	3; 41.53	4; 67.26	3; 108.79
July 27–29, 2024	2024 Southeast Asian Open Trophy	Senior	1; 39.60	2; 60.15	1; 99.75
2023–24 season
Date	Event	Level	SP	FS	Total
February 26– March 3, 2024	2024 World Junior Championships	Junior	45; 32.83	DNQ	45; 32.83
February 1–4, 2024	2024 Four Continents Championships	Senior	21; 42.43	17; 92.36	19; 134.79
September 14–17, 2023	2023 CS Autumn Classic International	Senior	9; 48.02	9; 80.91	9; 128.93
August 23–26, 2023	2023 JGP Thailand	Junior	16; 42.85	18; 70.21	19; 113.06
August 16–19, 2023	2023 Asian Open Trophy	Senior	9; 39.65	10; 73.95	9; 113.60
2022–23 season
Date	Event	Level	SP	FS	Total
February 27– March 5, 2023	2023 World Junior Championships	Junior	41; 37.05	DNQ	41; 37.05
December 19–20, 2022	2022 Philippine Championships	Senior	1; 53.32	1; 98.31	1; 151.63
December 7–10, 2022	2022 Asian Open Trophy	Senior	1; 50.19	1; 93.78	1; 143.97
September 28 – October 1, 2022	2022 JGP Poland I	Junior	18; 49.99	16; 92.76	16; 142.75
September 13–16, 2022	2022 CS U.S. Classic	Senior	13; 37.62	10; 78.27	11; 115.89
August 4–7, 2022	2022 Philadelphia Summer International	Senior	8; 43.59	10; 66.86	10; 110.45
2021–22 season
Date	Event	Level	SP	FS	Total
March 7–13, 2022	2022 World Junior Championships	Junior	19; **53.86**	21; 83.14	22; 137.00
January 18–23, 2022	2022 Four Continents Championships	Senior	14; 52.74	17; 86.52	16; 139.26
December 6–12, 2021	2021 Santa Claus Cup	Junior	23; 42.97	9; 99.94	13; 142.91
November 16–21, 2021	2021 Tallinn Trophy	Senior	5; 50.64	5; 97.22	5; 147.86
October 7–10, 2021	2021 CS Finlandia Trophy	Senior	18; 53.30	18; **94.79**	18; **148.09**
September 22–25, 2021	2021 CS Nebelhorn Trophy	Senior	22; 47.65	29; 81.13	24; 128.78
