= Ekaterina Geynish =

Russian-Uzbek pair skater (born 2006)

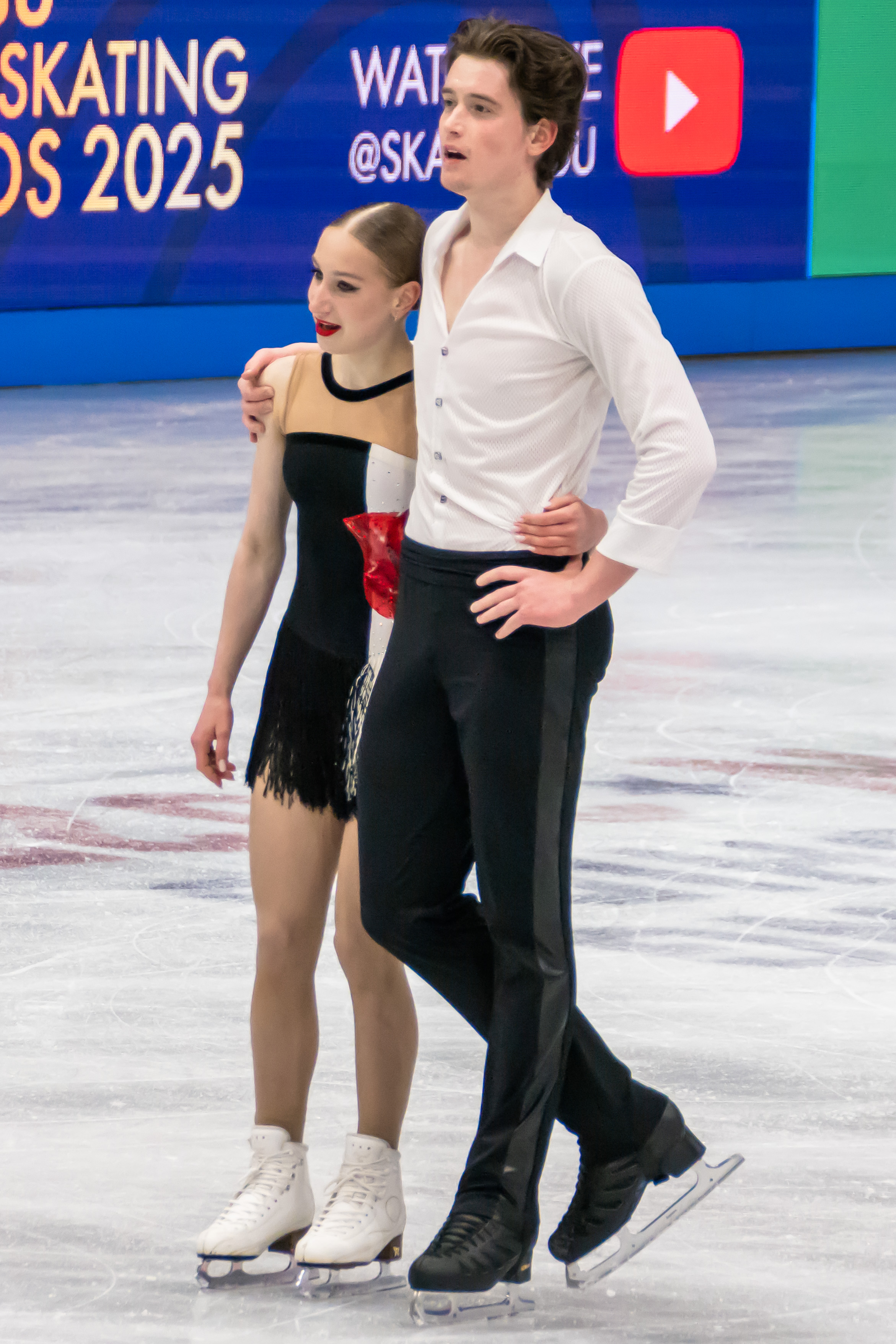
- Geynish and Chigirev after their free skate at the 2025 World Championships

Personal information
- Native name: Екатерина Павловна Гейниш
- Full name: Ekaterina Pavlovna Geynish
- Other names: Katya
- Born: 18 March 2006 (age 20) Moscow, Russia
- Home town: Moscow
- Height: 1.63 m (5 ft 4 in)

Figure skating career
- Country: Uzbekistan (since 2024); Russia (2019–23)
- Discipline: Pair skating
- Partner: Marco Zandron (since 2025); Dmitrii Chigirev (2022–25); Ilya Mironov (2021–22); Andrey Sachkov (2019–21)
- Coach: Nina Mozer; Vladislav Zhovnirski; Igor Chudin
- Skating club: Winter Sports Association of Uzbekistan
- Began skating: 2010

Ekaterina Pavlovna Geynish (born 18 March 2006) is a Russian pair skater. Competing for Uzbekistan with former partner, Dmitrii Chigirev, she is the 2025 Asian Winter Games champion, the 2024 Skate Canada International silver medalist, and the 2024 John Nicks International Pairs Competition bronze medalist.

They are the first Uzbek pair team to win an ISU Grand Prix medal.

== Personal life ==
Geynish was born on March 18, 2006 in Moscow, Russia. As a child, she attended a music school. In addition to figure skating, she enjoys knitting and photography.

== Career ==
=== Early career ===
Geynish began figure skating in 2010. As a singles skater, she trained at the Megasport Sport Palace in Moscow. Geynish made the decision to switch to pair skating in 2019 due to the discipline typically having more career longevity when compared to women's singles skating in Russia. Following this, she began training at the Moscow Skating School "Vorobyovy Gory" to train under Nina Mozer and Vladislav Zhovnirski. Her first pair partner was Andrey Sachkov, who she skated with until 2021. Together, the pair won bronze on the junior level at the 2019 IceLab.

Teaming up with Ilya Mironov in 2021, the pair won would win the gold medal on the junior level at the 2021 Budapest Trophy, finish eleventh at the 2022 Russian Championships, and finished fifth at the 2022 Russian Junior Championships. Their partnership dissolved following the 2021–22 figure skating season.

=== Partnership with Chigirev ===
==== 2022–23 season ====
Following the end of the 2021–22 figure skating season, Geynish teamed up with Dmitrii Chigirev. Geynish and Chigirev only competed at the 2022 Senior Russian Cup Grand Prix stages 2 and 5, placing fifth at both events.

In May 2024, it was announced that the pair had planned to begin competing for Uzbekistan and had submitted documents to the Figure Skating Federation of Russia to request a release, which was ultimately successful.

==== 2024–25: Debut for Uzbekistan ====
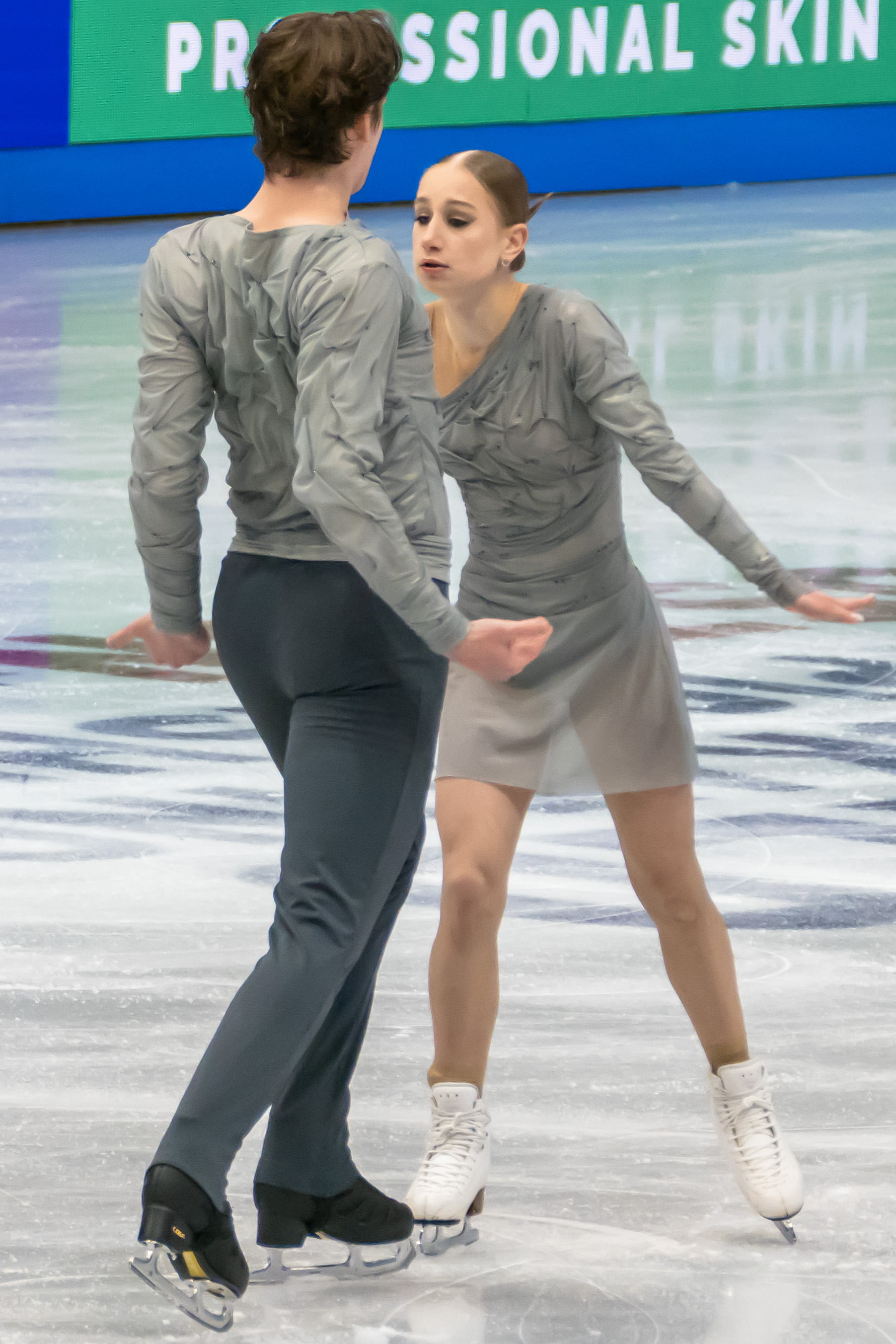
Geynish and Chigirev during their short program at the 2025 World Championships

Making their international debut for Uzbekistan in early September, Geynish and Chigirev won the bronze medal at the 2024 John Nicks International Pairs Competition. Selected to compete on the 2024–25 Grand Prix circuit, the pair competed at 2024 Skate Canada International, placing fourth in the short program, but winning the free skate and winning the silver medal. With this result, Geynish and Chigirev became the first pair team representing Uzbekistan to win a senior Grand Prix medal. One week later, the team competed at the 2024 Grand Prix de France, where they placed fifth in the short program and seventh in the free skate, dropping to sixth place overall.

Selected to compete at the 2025 Asian Winter Games in Harbin, China, Geynish/Chigirev won the gold medal.

At the 2025 Four Continents Championships in Seoul, South Korea, Geynish/Chigirev finished in eighth place after placing eighth in the short and free program segments. Going on to compete at the 2025 World Championships in Boston, Massachusetts, United States the following month, Geynish/Chigirev placed eleventh in the short program and tenth in the free skate, finishing tenth overall. With this placement, Geynish/Chigirev won Uzbekistan a quota for pair skating at the 2026 Winter Olympics.

In an interview following the event, Geynish shared, "We are quite happy with today's performance. The crowd was very supportive and warm, which really helped us. We felt like they truly enjoyed the moment when the music changed." Chigirev added, "We are very happy to have qualified an Olympic spot, this is every athlete's dream. This was our goal at the beginning of the season, and while we are thrilled, we are not surprised. Looking ahead to next season, our focus will be on improving our pair elements. We want them to be solid, secure, and as flawless as possible."

Despite this achievement, however, the pair were announced to have parted ways in September 2025.

== Honors and awards ==
- ISU Skating Awards 2025

== Programs ==
=== Pair skating with Dmitrii Chigirev (for Uzbekistan) ===
Season	Short program	Free skate	Ref.
2022–23	Gaucho (Dance of Argentinian Shepherds) By Nikolay Nekrasov	The Windmills of Your Mind By Michel Legrand Performed by Sting	
2024–25	The Deal Between Tsubaki and Lingba By Kiyoshi Yoshida Choreo. by Ramil Mekhdiev	Teatro By Concha Buika & Jacob Sureda Choreo. by Ramil Mekhdiev	

== Competitive highlights ==
- GP – Event of the ISU Grand Prix Series
- CS – Event of the ISU Challenger Series
- TBD – Assigned
- WD – Withdrew from competition

=== Pair skating with Dmitrii Chigirev (for Uzbekistan) ===
Competition placements at senior level
Season	2024–25
World Championships	10th
Four Continents Championships	8th
GP France	6th
GP Skate Canada	2nd
CS John Nicks Pairs	3rd
Asian Winter Games	1st

=== Pair skating with Ilya Mironov (for Russia) ===
Competition placements at junior level
Season	2021–22
Russian Championships (Senior)	11th
Russian Championships (Junior)	5th
Budapest Trophy	1st

=== Pair skating with Andrey Sachkov (for Russia) ===
Competition placements at junior level
Season	2019–20
IceLab	3rd

== Detailed results ==
=== Pair skating with Dmitrii Chigirev (for Uzbekistan) ===
ISU personal best scores in the +5/-5 GOE System
Segment	Type	Score	Event
Total	TSS	189.65	2024 Skate Canada International
Short program	TSS	64.62	2024 CS John Nicks Pairs Competition
Short program	TES	35.96	2024 CS John Nicks Pairs Competition
Short program	PCS	28.66	2024 CS John Nicks Pairs Competition
Free skating	TSS	126.12	2024 Skate Canada International
Free skating	TES	65.77	2024 Skate Canada International
Free skating	PCS	60.35	2024 Skate Canada International

Results in the 2024–25 season
Date	Event	SP		FS		Total	
Date	Event	P	Score	P	Score	P	Score
Sep 3–4, 2024	(United States) 2024 CS John Nicks Pairs Competition	2	64.62	5	112.34	3	176.96
Oct 25–27, 2024	2024 Skate Canada International	4	63.53	1	126.12	2	189.65
Nov 1-3, 2024	2024 Grand Prix de France	5	61.38	7	100.61	6	161.99
Feb 19–23, 2025	(South Korea) 2025 Four Continents Championships	8	61.94	8	110.50	8	172.44
Mar 25–30, 2025	(United States) 2025 World Championships	11	62.33	10	120.68	10	183.01
