= Figure skating at the 2025 Asian Winter Games – Pairs =

Pairs at the 2025 Asian Winter Games
- Venue: Heilongjiang Multifunctional Hall
- Dates: 11–12 February 2025
- Competitors: 12 from 5 nations

Medalists
| gold medal | Dmitrii Chigirev; Ekaterina Geynish | Uzbekistan |
| silver medal | Han Kum-chol; Ryom Tae-ok | North Korea |
| bronze medal | Sumitada Moriguchi; Yuna Nagaoka | Japan |

The pair skating event at the 2025 Asian Winter Games was held on 11 and 12 February 2025 at the Heilongjiang Ice Events Training Centre Multifunctional Hall in Harbin, China.

== Schedule ==
All times are China Standard Time (UTC+08:00)

| Date | Time | Event |
|---|---|---|
| Tuesday, 11 February 2025 | 15:30 | Short program |
| Wednesday, 12 February 2025 | 19:30 | Free skating |

== Results ==
| Rank | Team | SP | FS | Total |
|---|---|---|---|---|
| 1st place, gold medalist(s) | Uzbekistan (UZB); Dmitrii Chigirev; Ekaterina Geynish | 64.55 | 111.88 | 176.43 |
| 2nd place, silver medalist(s) | North Korea (PRK); Han Kum-chol; Ryom Tae-ok | 56.68 | 112.20 | 168.88 |
| 3rd place, bronze medalist(s) | Japan (JPN); Sumitada Moriguchi; Yuna Nagaoka | 58.49 | 109.86 | 168.35 |
| 4 | Philippines (PHI); Aleksandr Korovin; Isabella Gamez | 55.63 | 99.99 | 155.62 |
| 5 | China (CHN); Zhu Lei; Wang Yuchen | 52.05 | 91.71 | 143.76 |
| 6 | Japan (JPN); Lucas Tsuyoshi Honda; Sae Shimizu | 45.69 | 89.89 | 135.58 |
