= Dmitrii Chigirev =

Russian-Uzbek pair skater (born 2001)

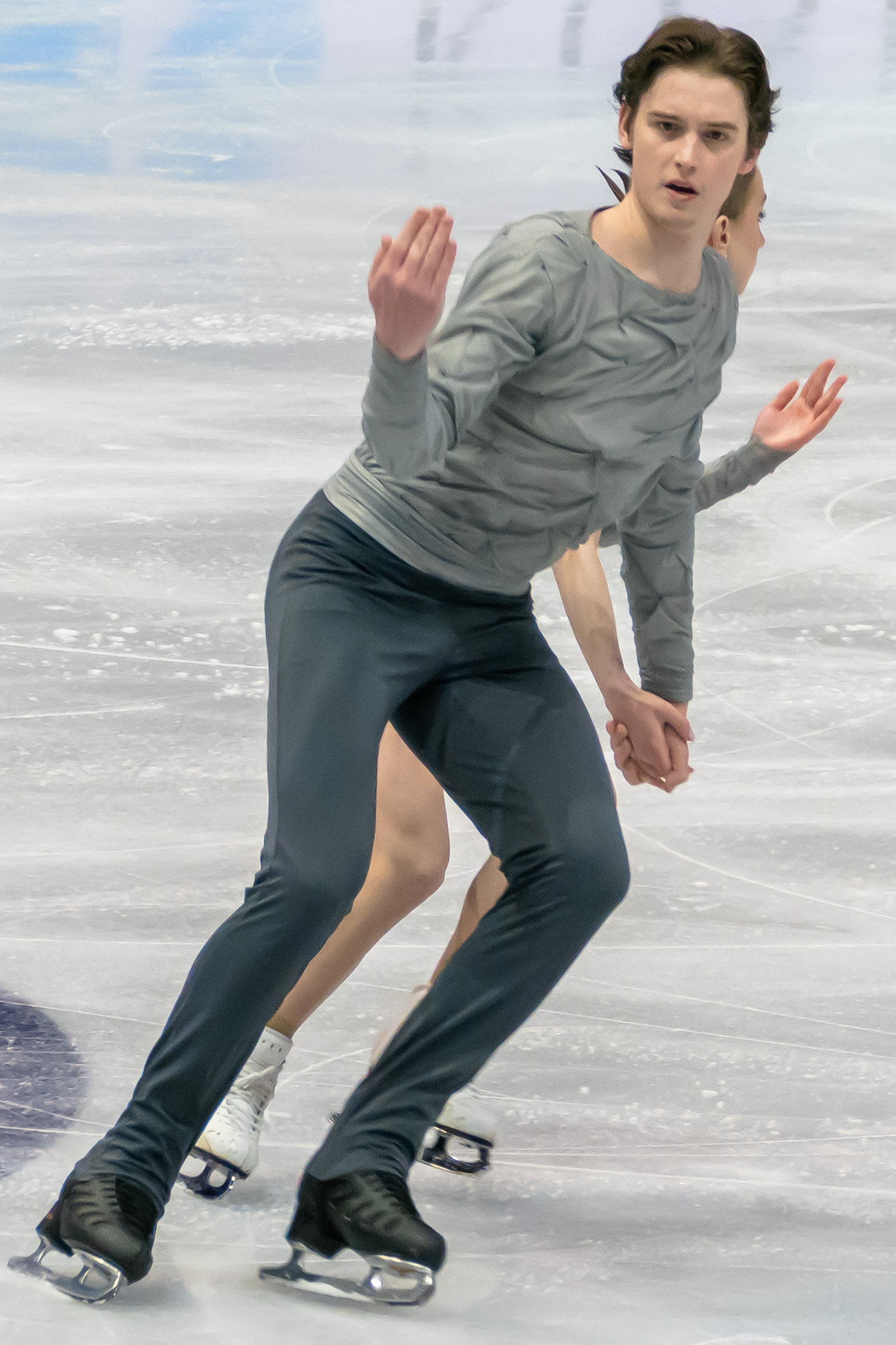
- Geynish and Chigirev during the short program at the 2025 World Championships

Personal information
- Native name: Дмитрий Евгеньевич Чигирев
- Full name: Dmitrii Evgenievich Chigirev
- Other names: Dmitry
- Born: 1 April 2001 (age 25) Saransk, Russia
- Home town: Moscow, Russia
- Height: 1.88 m (6 ft 2 in)

Figure skating career
- Country: Uzbekistan (since 2024); Russia (2018–23)
- Discipline: Pair skating
- Partner: Ekaterina Geynish (2022–25); Anastasia Kostyuk (2021–22); Ekaterina Belova (2018–21)
- Coach: Nina Mozer; Vladislav Zhovnirski; Igor Chudin
- Skating club: Winter Sports Association of Uzbekistan
- Began skating: 2008

Dmitrii Evgenievich Chigirev (born 1 April 2001) is a Russian pair skater. Competing for Uzbekistan with his former skating partner, Ekaterina Geynish, he is the 2025 Asian Winter Games champion, the 2024 Skate Canada International silver medalist, and the 2024 John Nicks International Pairs Competition bronze medalist.

They are the first Uzbek pair team to win an ISU Grand Prix medal.

== Personal life ==
Chigirev was born on April 1, 2001, in Saransk, Russia. He briefly dated former two-time World Champion women's singles skater, Evgenia Medvedeva, from 2023 to 2024.

In addition to figure skating, he also enjoys video games, bikes, reading, and music.

== Career ==
=== Early career ===
Chigirev began figure skating in 2008. He originally trained at the SSh Figure Skating Academy in Saransk as a singles skater until 2016 when he decided to switch to pairs. During his first two years as a pair skater, he was partnered with Nadezhda Labazina and Lina Dreyer. Following this, Chigirev moved to Moscow to train under Artur Dmitriev at the UOR 4 Moscow Gomelski Academy and then teamed up with Ekaterina Belova. The pair competed for three seasons together, finishing ninth at the 2019 Russian Junior Championships, tenth at the 2020 Russian Junior Championships, and twelfth at the 2020 Russian Championships. The pair split following the 2020–21 figure skating season and Chigirev made the decision to transfer to the Moscow Skating School "Vorobyovy Gory" to train under Nina Mozer and Vladislav Zhovnirski.

In April 2022, Mozer and Zhovnirski paired Chigirev up with Anastasia Kostyuk. Together, the pair won silver on the junior level at the 2022 Budapest Trophy. However, their partnership soon dissolved thereafter.

=== Partnership with Geynish ===
==== 2022–23 season ====
Following the end of the 2021–22 figure skating season, Chigirev teamed up with Ekaterina Geynish. Geynish and Chigirev only competed at the 2022 Senior Russian Cup Grand Prix stages 2 and 5, placing fifth at both events.

In May 2023, it was announced that the pair had planned to begin competing for Uzbekistan and had submitted documents to the Figure Skating Federation of Russia to request a release, which was ultimately successful.

==== 2024–25: Debut for Uzbekistan ====
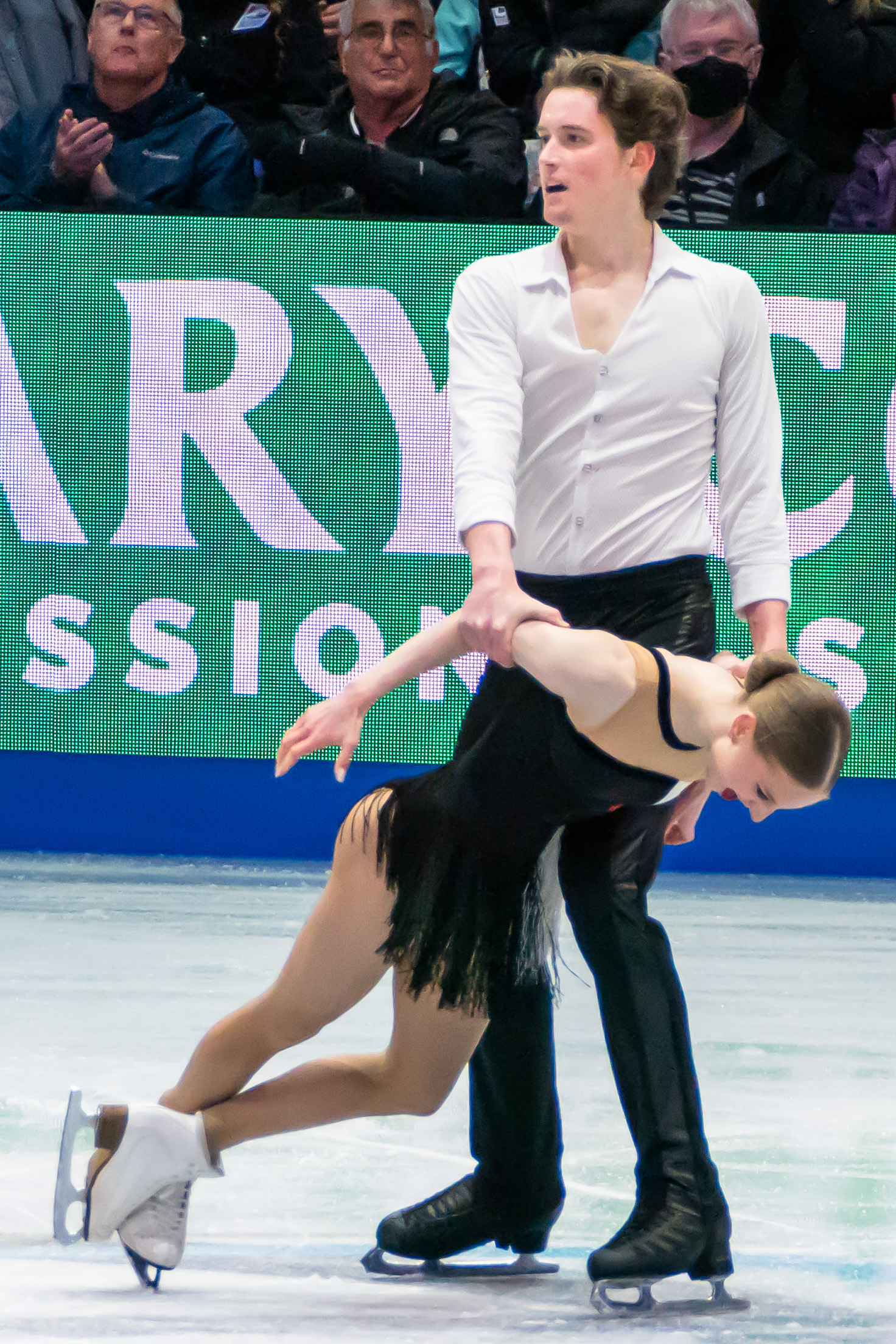
Geynish and Chigirev finishing their free skate at the 2025 World Championships

Making their international debut for Uzbekistan in early September, Geynish and Chigirev won the bronze medal at the 2024 John Nicks International Pairs Competition. Selected to compete on the 2024–25 Grand Prix circuit, the pair competed at 2024 Skate Canada International, placing fourth in the short program, but winning the free skate and winning the silver medal. With this result, Geynish and Chigirev became the first pair team representing Uzbekistan to win a senior Grand Prix medal. One week later, the team competed at the 2024 Grand Prix de France, where they placed fifth in the short program and seventh in the free skate, dropping to sixth place overall.

Selected to compete at the 2025 Asian Winter Games in Harbin, China, Geynish/Chigirev won the gold medal.

At the 2025 Four Continents Championships in Seoul, South Korea, Geynish/Chigirev finished in eighth place after placing eighth in the short and free program segments. Going on to compete at the 2025 World Championships in Boston, Massachusetts, United States the following month, Geynish/Chigirev placed eleventh in the short program and tenth in the free skate, finishing tenth overall. With this placement, Geynish/Chigirev won Uzbekistan a quota for pair skating at the 2026 Winter Olympics.

In an interview following the event, Geynish shared, "We are quite happy with today’s performance. The crowd was very supportive and warm, which really helped us. We felt like they truly enjoyed the moment when the music changed." Chigirev added, "We are very happy to have qualified an Olympic spot, this is every athlete’s dream. This was our goal at the beginning of the season, and while we are thrilled, we are not surprised. Looking ahead to next season, our focus will be on improving our pair elements. We want them to be solid, secure, and as flawless as possible."

The pair were announced to have parted ways in September 2025 due his injury related retirement.

== Honors and awards ==
- ISU Skating Awards 2025

== Programs ==
=== Pair skating with Ekaterina Geynish (for Uzbekistan) ===
| Season | Short program | Free skate | Ref. |
|---|---|---|---|
| 2022–23 | Gaucho (Dance of Argentinian Shepherds) By Nikolay Nekrasov | The Windmills of Your Mind By Michel Legrand Performed by Sting | |
| 2024–25 | The Deal Between Tsubaki and Lingba By Kiyoshi Yoshida Choreo. by Ramil Mekhdiev | Teatro By Concha Buika & Jacob Sureda Choreo. by Ramil Mekhdiev | |

== Competitive highlights ==
- GP – Event of the ISU Grand Prix Series
- CS – Event of the ISU Challenger Series
- TBD – Assigned
- WD – Withdrew from competition

=== Pair skating with Ekaterina Geynish (for Uzbekistan) ===
Competition placements at senior level
| Season | 2024–25 |
|---|---|
| World Championships | 10th |
| Four Continents Championships | 8th |
| GP France | 6th |
| GP Skate Canada | 2nd |
| CS John Nicks Pairs | 3rd |
| Asian Winter Games | 1st |

=== Pair skating with Anastasia Kostyuk (for Russia) ===
Competition placements at junior level
| Season | 2021–22 |
|---|---|
| Budapest Trophy | 2nd |

=== Pair skating with Ekaterina Belova (for Russia) ===
Competition placements at junior level
| Season | 2018–19 | 2019–20 |
|---|---|---|
| Russian Championships (Senior) | | 12th |
| Russian Championships (Junior) | 9th | 10th |

== Detailed results ==
=== Pair skating with Ekaterina Geynish (for Uzbekistan) ===
ISU personal best scores in the +5/-5 GOE System
| Segment | Type | Score | Event |
|---|---|---|---|
| Total | TSS | 189.65 | 2024 Skate Canada International |
| Short program | TSS | 64.62 | 2024 CS John Nicks Pairs Competition |
| Short program | TES | 35.96 | 2024 CS John Nicks Pairs Competition |
| Short program | PCS | 28.66 | 2024 CS John Nicks Pairs Competition |
| Free skating | TSS | 126.12 | 2024 Skate Canada International |
| Free skating | TES | 65.77 | 2024 Skate Canada International |
| Free skating | PCS | 60.35 | 2024 Skate Canada International |

Results in the 2024–25 season
| Date | Event | SP | | FS | | Total | |
| Date | Event | P | Score | P | Score | P | Score |
|---|---|---|---|---|---|---|---|
| Sep 3–4, 2024 | (United States) 2024 CS John Nicks Pairs Competition | 2 | 64.62 | 5 | 112.34 | 3 | 176.96 |
| Oct 25–27, 2024 | 2024 Skate Canada International | 4 | 63.53 | 1 | 126.12 | 2 | 189.65 |
| Nov 1-3, 2024 | 2024 Grand Prix de France | 5 | 61.38 | 7 | 100.61 | 6 | 161.99 |
| Feb 19–23, 2025 | (South Korea) 2025 Four Continents Championships | 8 | 61.94 | 8 | 110.50 | 8 | 172.44 |
| Mar 25–30, 2025 | (United States) 2025 World Championships | 11 | 62.33 | 10 | 120.68 | 10 | 183.01 |
