= ISU Figure Skating Awards =

Annual awards ceremony

- Sunday, March 30
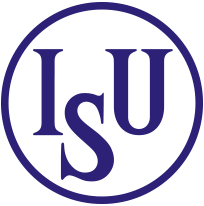
- Location: Prague
- Country: Czech Republic
- Presented by: International Skating Union
- First award: 2020
- Website: www.isu.org/figure-skating/isu-skating-awards/

The ISU Figure Skating Awards, former ISU Skating Awards is an annual awards ceremony organized by the International Skating Union (ISU) to recognize achievements in Figure Skating.

The awards are presented in a variety of categories: Most Entertaining Program, Skater(s) of the Year (former Most Valuable Skater), Special Achievement, Lifetime Achievement, Best Coach, Best Choreographer, Best Costume and Best Newcomer.

A long list of candidates is selected by a Selection Commission which is submitted to a public and media vote. The public vote counts for 2/3 while the media vote counts for 1/3.

In 2026, the following categories were open for voting:

- Best Costume
- Most Entertaining Program
- Best Coach
- Best Choreographer

The following categories were not subject to voting:

- Best Newcomer
- Skater(s) of the year

Following the public / media vote, three nominees in each category are announced and finally the Award winners are decided by an expert international jury in six categories.

== History ==
First announced in 2019, the ISU Figure Skating Awards were created to celebrate and recognize outstanding achievements in Figure Skating.

The inaugural event was originally set to take place during the 2020 ISU World Figure Skating Championships in Montreal, Canada. However, due to the global pandemic, the ceremony was moved online and hosted by Tanith White (1x Olympic silver and 2 x World silver medalist) and Charlie White, (Olympic and two time world Champion) ice dancers who brought their expertise and energy to the first-ever virtual event.

In 2023 and 2024, the ceremony was held in Zürich, Switzerland, alongside an on-ice live show in partnership with Art on Ice and was streamed on the Skating ISU YouTube channel.

In 2025, it was announced that the Awards ceremony would be a standalone event. The 2025 ceremony took place on 30 March in Boston, Massachusetts on the final day of the ISU World Figure Skating Championships.

The following categories have been presented throughout the years:

- Most Valuable Skater
- Most Entertaining Program
- Best Newcomer
- Best Costume
- Best Coach
- Best Choreographer
- Lifetime Achievement
- Special Achievement (since 2023)

== Past Winners ==
The following lists detail ISU Skating Awards winners to date.

=== 2020 ===
Award	Winner(s)	Other nominees
Most Valuable Skater	(Japan) Yuzuru Hanyu	(United States) Nathan Chen (France) Gabriella Papadakis / Guillaume Cizeron
Most Entertaining Program	(France) Gabriella Papadakis / Guillaume Cizeron	(Russia) Evgenia Medvedeva (France) Kévin Aymoz
Best Newcomer	(Russia) Alena Kostornaia	(Russia) Alexandra Trusova (South Korea) Young You
Best Costume	(United States) Madison Chock / Evan Bates	(Japan) Yuzuru Hanyu (Russia) Anna Shcherbakova
Best Coach	(Russia) Eteri Tutberidze	(United States) Rafael Arutyunyan (Canada) Brian Orser
Best Choreographer	(Canada) Shae-Lynn Bourne	(Canada) Marie-France Dubreuil (Canada) Lori Nichol
Lifetime Achievement	(Canada) Kurt Browning	—N/a

=== 2021 ===
Award	Winner(s)	Other nominees
Lifetime Achievement	(Russia) Tamara Moskvina (Russia) Alexei Mishin (United Kingdom) Jayne Torvill / Christopher Dean	—N/a

=== 2022 ===
- Awards postponed

=== 2023 ===
Award	Winner(s)	Other nominees
Most Valuable Skater	(United States) Nathan Chen	(France) Gabriella Papadakis / Guillaume Cizeron (Russia) Anna Shcherbakova
Most Entertaining Program	(France) Gabriella Papadakis / Guillaume Cizeron	(Mexico) Donovan Carrillo (Japan) Yuzuru Hanyu
Best Newcomer	(United States) Isabeau Levito	(Estonia) Niina Petrõkina (Japan) Rinka Watanabe
Best Costume	(United States) Madison Chock / Evan Bates	(Japan) Yuzuru Hanyu (Belgium) Loena Hendrickx
Best Coach	(Canada) Patrice Lauzon	(United States) Rafael Arutyunyan (Switzerland) Stéphane Lambiel
Best Choreographer	(Canada) Shae-Lynn Bourne	Benoît Richaud (Canada) Marie-France Dubreuil
Special Achievement	(United States) Ilia Malinin	—N/a
Lifetime Achievement	(Germany) Katarina Witt	—N/a

=== 2024 ===
Award	Winner(s)	Other nominees
Most Valuable Skater	(United States) Ilia Malinin	(Japan) Kaori Sakamoto (Japan) Shoma Uno
Most Entertaining Program	(France) Adam Siao Him Fa	(France) Kevin Aymoz (United Kingdom) Lilah Fear / Lewis Gibson
Best Newcomer	(Japan) Hana Yoshida	(Belgium) Nina Pinzarrone (Switzerland) Kimmy Repond
Best Costume	(Belgium) Loena Hendrickx	(United States) Madison Chock / Evan Bates (South Korea) Lee Hae-in
Best Coach	(Japan) Mie Hamada	(Switzerland) Stéphane Lambiel (Japan) Sonoko Nakano
Best Choreographer	(France) Benoît Richaud	(Canada) Shae-Lynn Bourne (Switzerland) Stéphane Lambiel
Special Achievement	(Canada) Deanna Stellato-Dudek	—N/a
Lifetime Achievement	(Canada) Brian Orser	—N/a

=== 2025 ===
Award	Winner(s)	Other nominees
Skater(s) of the Year	(United States) Ilia Malinin (United States) Madison Chock / Evan Bates	—N/a
Most Entertaining Program	(United States) Ilia Malinin	(South Korea) Cha Jun-hwan (Spain) Olivia Smart / Tim Dieck
Best Newcomer	(Uzbekistan) Ekaterina Geynish / Dmitrii Chigirev	(United States) Sarah Everhardt (Italy) Anna Pezzetta
Best Costume	(Spain) Olivia Smart / Tim Dieck	(South Korea) Cha Jun-hwan (United States) Ilia Malinin
Best Coach	(Uzbekistan) Tatiana Malinina / Roman Skorniakov	(Japan) Mie Hamada (Germany) Michael Huth
Best Choreographer	(Canada) Shae-Lynn Bourne	(Switzerland) Stéphane Lambiel (France) Benoît Richaud
Lifetime Achievement	(United States) Scott Hamilton	—N/a

=== 2026 ===
Award	Winner(s)	Other nominees
Skater(s) of the Year	(France) Laurence Fournier Beaudry / Guillaume Cizeron	—N/a
Most Entertaining Program	(Japan) Yuma Kagiyama	(United States) Amber Glenn (United States) Ilia Malinin
Best Newcomer	(Japan) Ami Nakai	—N/a
Best Costume	(United States) Ilia Malinin	(Canada) Piper Gilles / Paul Poirier (United States) Amber Glenn
Best Coach	(United States) Phillip DiGuglielmo	(United States) Damon Allen (Japan) Masakazu Kagiyama
Best Choreographer	(France) Benoît Richaud	(Canada) Shae-Lynn Bourne (Italy) Massimo Scali

== Wins per country (2020–2026) ==
Country	Wins
United States	12
Canada	7
France	6
Japan	5
Russia	4
Uzbekistan	2
Belgium	1
Germany	1
Spain	1
United Kingdom	1

== Jurors ==
The ISU Skating Awards jury is made up of six jurors each of whom is a former Figure Skating Champion.

Year	Jurors
2020	Eric Radford (CAN) Lu Chen (CHN) Surya Bonaly (FRA) Miki Ando (JPN) Tatyana Navka (RUS) Todd Eldredge (USA)
2021	-
2022	-
2023	Eric Radford (CAN) Kiira Korpi (FIN) Surya Bonaly (FRA) Miki Ando (JPN) Christopher Dean (GBR) Todd Eldredge (USA)
2024	Miki Ando (JPN) Brian Boitano (USA) Surya Bonaly (FRA) Lu Chen (CHN) Laura Lepisto (FIN) Andrew Poje (CAN)

== Special Guests ==
Each year the ISU Skating Awards features a special performance from a star guest.

- 2020: Aloe Blacc, singer/songwriter
- 2021: James Morrison, singer/songwriter/guitarist
- 2023: Melanie C, singer/songwriter/original member of The Spice Girls
- 2024: Dave Stewart, musician/songwriter/producer, original member of Eurythmics
