= 2024 Skate Canada International =

Figure skating competition

- Type: Grand Prix
- Date: October 25 – 27
- Season: 2024–25
- Location: Halifax, Nova Scotia, Canada
- Host: Skate Canada
- Venue: Scotiabank Centre

Champions
- Men's singles: (United States) Ilia Malinin
- Women's singles: (Japan) Kaori Sakamoto
- Pairs: (Canada) Deanna Stellato-Dudek and Maxime Deschamps
- Ice dance: (Canada) Piper Gilles and Paul Poirier
- Previous: 2023 Skate Canada International
- Next: 2025 Skate Canada International
- Previous Grand Prix: 2024 Skate America
- Next Grand Prix: 2024 Grand Prix de France

The 2024 Skate Canada International was the second event of the 2024–25 ISU Grand Prix of Figure Skating: a senior-level international invitational competition series. It was held at the Scotiabank Centre in Halifax, Nova Scotia, from October 25–27. Medals were awarded in men's singles, women's singles, pair skating, and ice dance. Skaters also earned points toward qualifying for the 2024–25 Grand Prix Final.

== Entries ==
The International Skating Union announced the preliminary assignments on June 9, 2024.

Country	Men	Women	Pairs	Ice dance
Australia	—		Anastasia Golubeva; Hektor Giotopoulos Moore	Holly Harris; Jason Chan
Azerbaijan	Vladimir Litvintsev	—		
Canada	Stephen Gogolev	Sara-Maude Dupuis	Kelly Ann Laurin; Loucas Éthier	Alicia Fabbri; Paul Ayer
Canada	Aleksa Rakic	Kaiya Ruiter	Deanna Stellato-Dudek; Maxime Deschamps	Piper Gilles; Paul Poirier
Canada	Roman Sadovsky	Madeline Schizas	—	Marjorie Lajoie; Zachary Lagha
Czech Republic	—			Natálie Taschlerová; Filip Taschler
France	Luc Economides	—		Evgenia Lopareva; Geoffrey Brissaud
Germany	—		Annika Hocke; Robert Kunkel	—
Israel	Mark Gorodnitsky	—		
Italy	Gabriele Frangipani	—		
Japan	Shun Sato	Rino Matsuike	—	
Japan	Sōta Yamamoto	Kaori Sakamoto	—	
Japan	—	Hana Yoshida	—	
Netherlands	—		Daria Danilova; Michel Tsiba	—
Poland	—	Ekaterina Kurakova	Ioulia Chtchetinina; Michał Woźniak	—
South Korea	Cha Jun-hwan	Kim Ye-lim	—	Hannah Lim; Ye Quan
South Korea	—	Wi Seo-yeong	—	—
Switzerland	—	Kimmy Repond	—	
United States	Jason Brown	Elyce Lin-Gracey	Emily Chan; Spencer Akira Howe	Emily Bratti; Ian Somerville
United States	Ilia Malinin	Alysa Liu	—	Oona Brown; Gage Brown
United States	—		—	Emilea Zingas; Vadym Kolesnik
Uzbekistan	—		Ekaterina Geynish; Dmitrii Chigirev	—

=== Changes to preliminary assignments ===
Discipline	Withdrew		Added		Notes	Ref.
Discipline	Date	Skater(s)	Date	Skater(s)	Notes	Ref.
Ice dance	June 26	(Germany); Darya Grimm; Michail Savitskiy	June 26	(Australia); Holly Harris; Jason Chan	Grimm and Savitsky to remain on the Junior Grand Prix circuit	
Women	August 5	(United States); Ava Marie Ziegler	August 7	(Finland); Nella Pelkonen	Injury (Ziegler)	
Pairs	—		September 23	(Uzbekistan); Ekaterina Geynish; Dmitrii Chigirev	Host picks	
Women	October 11	(Finland); Nella Pelkonen	October 11	(United States); Elyce Lin-Gracey	Illness and injury (Pelkonen)	
Pairs	October 18	(Italy); Lucrezia Beccari; Matteo Guarise	October 21	(Poland); Ioulia Chtchetinina; Michał Woźniak	Foot issues (Beccari)	

== Results ==
=== Men's singles ===
Men's results
Rank	Skater	Nation	Total points	SP		FS	
1st place, gold medalist(s)	Ilia Malinin	United States	301.82	1	106.22	1	195.60
2nd place, silver medalist(s)	Shun Sato	Japan	261.16	2	96.52	4	164.64
3rd place, bronze medalist(s)	Cha Jun-hwan	South Korea	260.31	4	88.38	2	171.93
4	Sōta Yamamoto	Japan	257.00	3	92.16	3	164.84
5	Vladimir Litvintsev	Azerbaijan	222.90	6	79.11	7	143.79
6	Gabriele Frangipani	Italy	222.57	10	76.18	5	146.39
7	Aleksa Rakic	Canada	222.49	9	76.74	6	145.75
8	Jason Brown	United States	218.75	7	79.03	9	139.72
9	Stephen Gogolev	Canada	216.84	5	82.70	10	134.14
10	Mark Gorodnitsky	Israel	213.41	11	71.79	8	141.62
11	Luc Economides	France	211.88	8	77.87	11	134.01
12	Roman Sadovsky	Canada	Withdrew	12	63.37	Withdrew from competition	

=== Women's singles ===
Women's results
Rank	Skater	Nation	Total points	SP		FS	
1st place, gold medalist(s)	Kaori Sakamoto	Japan	201.21	1	74.97	2	126.24
2nd place, silver medalist(s)	Rino Matsuike	Japan	192.16	10	52.31	1	139.85
3rd place, bronze medalist(s)	Hana Yoshida	Japan	191.37	4	65.32	3	126.05
4	Kimmy Repond	Switzerland	191.07	3	66.94	5	124.13
5	Madeline Schizas	Canada	190.04	5	65.28	4	124.76
6	Alysa Liu	United States	187.69	2	67.68	7	120.01
7	Elyce Lin-Gracey	United States	182.37	6	58.64	6	123.73
8	Kaiya Ruiter	Canada	162.32	7	57.66	10	104.66
9	Ekaterina Kurakova	Poland	162.07	12	47.31	8	114.76
10	Sara-Maude Dupuis	Canada	160.46	9	54.15	9	106.31
11	Wi Seo-yeong	South Korea	140.85	11	47.86	11	92.99
12	Kim Ye-lim	South Korea	136.14	8	56.12	12	80.02

=== Pairs ===
Pairs results
Rank	Team	Nation	Total points	SP		FS	
1st place, gold medalist(s)	Deanna Stellato-Dudek; Maxime Deschamps	Canada	197.33	1	73.23	2	124.10
2nd place, silver medalist(s)	Ekaterina Geynish; Dmitrii Chigirev	Uzbekistan	189.65	4	63.53	1	126.12
3rd place, bronze medalist(s)	Anastasia Golubeva; Hektor Giotopoulos Moore	Australia	186.14	3	64.81	3	121.33
4	Annika Hocke; Robert Kunkel	Germany	184.30	2	64.82	4	119.48
5	Emily Chan; Spencer Akira Howe	United States	178.31	5	61.04	5	117.27
6	Ioulia Chtchetinina; Michał Woźniak	Poland	173.84	6	60.87	6	112.97
7	Daria Danilova; Michel Tsiba	Netherlands	171.02	7	58.78	7	112.24
8	Kelly Ann Laurin; Loucas Éthier	Canada	163.60	8	52.16	8	111.44

=== Ice dance ===
Ice dance results
Rank	Skater	Nation	Total points	RD		FD	
1st place, gold medalist(s)	Piper Gilles; Paul Poirier	Canada	214.84	1	86.44	1	128.40
2nd place, silver medalist(s)	Marjorie Lajoie; Zachary Lagha	Canada	199.90	2	77.34	2	122.56
3rd place, bronze medalist(s)	Evgenia Lopareva; Geoffrey Brissaud	France	194.25	3	76.76	3	117.49
4	Natálie Taschlerová; Filip Taschler	Czech Republic	189.60	5	74.97	4	114.63
5	Emilea Zingas; Vadym Kolesnik	United States	189.41	4	75.63	5	113.78
6	Oona Brown; Gage Brown	United States	179.14	6	72.18	6	106.96
7	Hannah Lim; Ye Quan	South Korea	177.09	8	70.64	7	106.45
8	Alicia Fabbri; Paul Ayer	Canada	174.45	9	70.10	8	104.35
9	Emily Bratti; Ian Somerville	United States	173.08	7	71.48	9	101.60
10	Holly Harris; Jason Chan	Australia	163.51	10	64.11	10	99.40
