= Lia Pereira =

Canadian figure skater (born 2004)

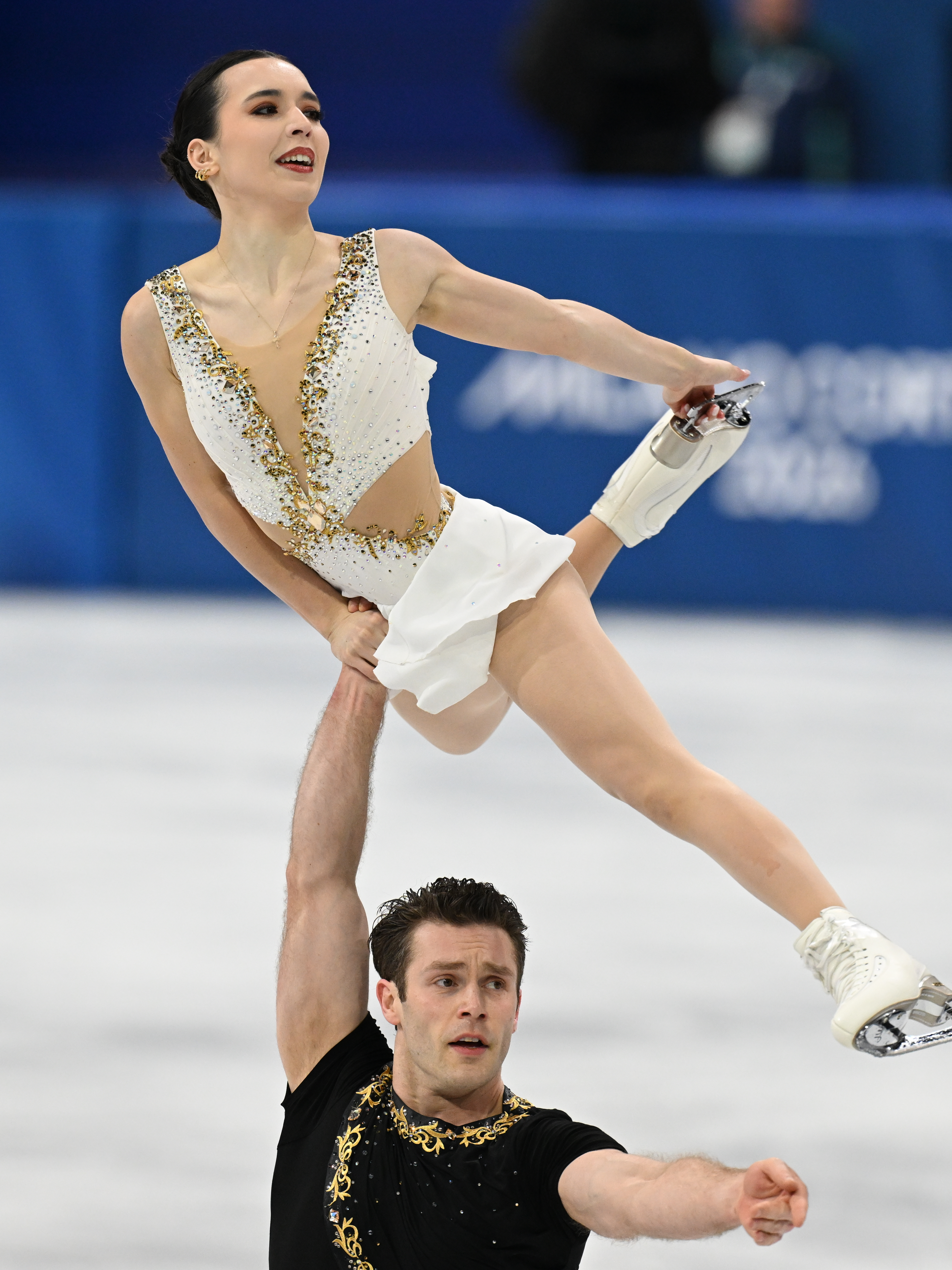
- Pereira at the 2026 Winter Olympics with skating partner Trennt Michaud

Personal information
- Born: March 5, 2004 (age 22) Milton, Ontario, Canada
- Height: 1.59 m (5 ft 3 in)

Figure skating career
- Country: Canada
- Discipline: Pair skating (since 2022); Women's singles (2018–23)
- Partner: Trennt Michaud
- Coach: Alison Purkiss; Nancy Lemaire; Michael Marinaro
- Skating club: Milton Skating Club
- Began skating: 2012

Medal record
World Championships
Bronze medal – third place	2026 Prague	Pairs
Four Continents Championships
Bronze medal – third place	2025 Seoul	Pairs
Canadian Championships
Gold medal – first place	2026 Gatineau	Pairs
Silver medal – second place	2024 Calgary	Pairs
Silver medal – second place	2025 Laval	Pairs
Bronze medal – third place	2023 Oshawa	Pairs

Lia Pereira (born March 5, 2004) is a Canadian pair skater. With her skating partner, Trennt Michaud, she is the 2026 World bronze medalist, the 2025 Four Continents bronze medalist, a five-time ISU Grand Prix medalist (including golds at the 2023 Grand Prix de France and 2026 Skate Canada International), and the 2026 Canadian national champion. With Michaud, she represented Canada at the 2026 Winter Olympics.

== Personal life ==
Pereira was born on March 5, 2004, in Milton, Ontario, Canada and is of Portuguese descent. In September 2023, she began studying at the University of Guelph's Gordon S. Lang School of Business and Economics, majoring in business management.

== Skating career ==
=== Women's singles career ===
==== Early years ====
Pereira began figure skating in 2012. She made her novice debut as a singles skater in the 2018–19 season. In an early international foray, she won the gold medal at Skate Milwaukee on the 2018 North American Series. Pereira was sixteenth at the 2019 Canadian Novice Championships.

In her second season as a novice, Pereira was the silver medalist at the 2020 Skate Canada Challenge. She went on to win the bronze medal at the 2020 Canadian Novice Championships. With the onset of the COVID-19 pandemic, both domestic and international competitions were heavily impeded, as was skater training. Pereira moved up to the junior level, with her most notable competition being the virtual 2021 Skate Canada Challenge, where she won the bronze medal.

==== 2021–22 season: Junior international debut ====
With the resumption of international competitions, Pereira made her junior international debut at the Cranberry Cup International in Norwood, placing fifth in the junior women's division. She was then assigned by Skate Canada to make her ISU Junior Grand Prix debut at the 2021 JGP Russia in Krasnoyarsk. After finishing tenth overall, she called it "an amazing experience," adding, "I learned a lot more about myself [and] about how to handle the pressure of an event like this."

Pereira competed at the senior level domestically, coming tenth in her debut at the 2022 Canadian Championships. She was chosen to represent Canada at the 2022 World Junior Championships, alongside junior national champion Justine Miclette, but events would soon complicate the situation. Due to the invasion of Ukraine, the International Skating Union banned all Russian and Belarusian athletes from competing at ISU championships. Additionally, due to concerns related to the Omicron variant, the World Junior Championships could not be held as scheduled in Sofia in early March and were rescheduled for mid-April in Tallinn. Both Pereira and Miclette were first sent to the International Challenge Cup, where Pereira finished sixth, including a third-place finish in the free skate. She achieved a personal best of 158.86 points at the World Junior Championships, where she finished fourteenth, despite being twelfth and thirteenth in the two segments.

=== Pair skating career ===
==== 2022–23 season: Partnership with Trennt Michaud ====
Pereira again opened her season at the Cranberry Cup International, winning gold in the junior women's event. Returning as well to the ISU Junior Grand Prix series, she finished sixth at the 2022 JGP France in Courchevel, setting a new personal best score in the free skate. She was then assigned to make her senior international debut at the 2022 CS Finlandia Trophy, where she placed fifteenth.

In the midst of her singles career, Pereira received the opportunity to form a pairs partnership with three-time national silver medalist Trennt Michaud, following the retirement of his previous partner, Evelyn Walsh. She was sought out on the recommendation of coach Alison Purkiss. Pereira/Michaud made their competitive debut at the Skate Ontario sectional qualifier in November, winning the gold medal. They went on to win the final national qualifying event, the Skate Canada Challenge. Pereira said afterwards that they were "just growing together and each competition is a new learning experience." Pereira finished eighth in the senior women's event at the Skate Canada Challenge, qualifying for the national championships in two disciplines. Shortly thereafter, Pereira/Michaud made their international debut at the 2022 CS Golden Spin of Zagreb. Fourth after the short program, they rose to third place in the free skate, winning the bronze medal and securing the minimum scores to compete at future ISU championships.

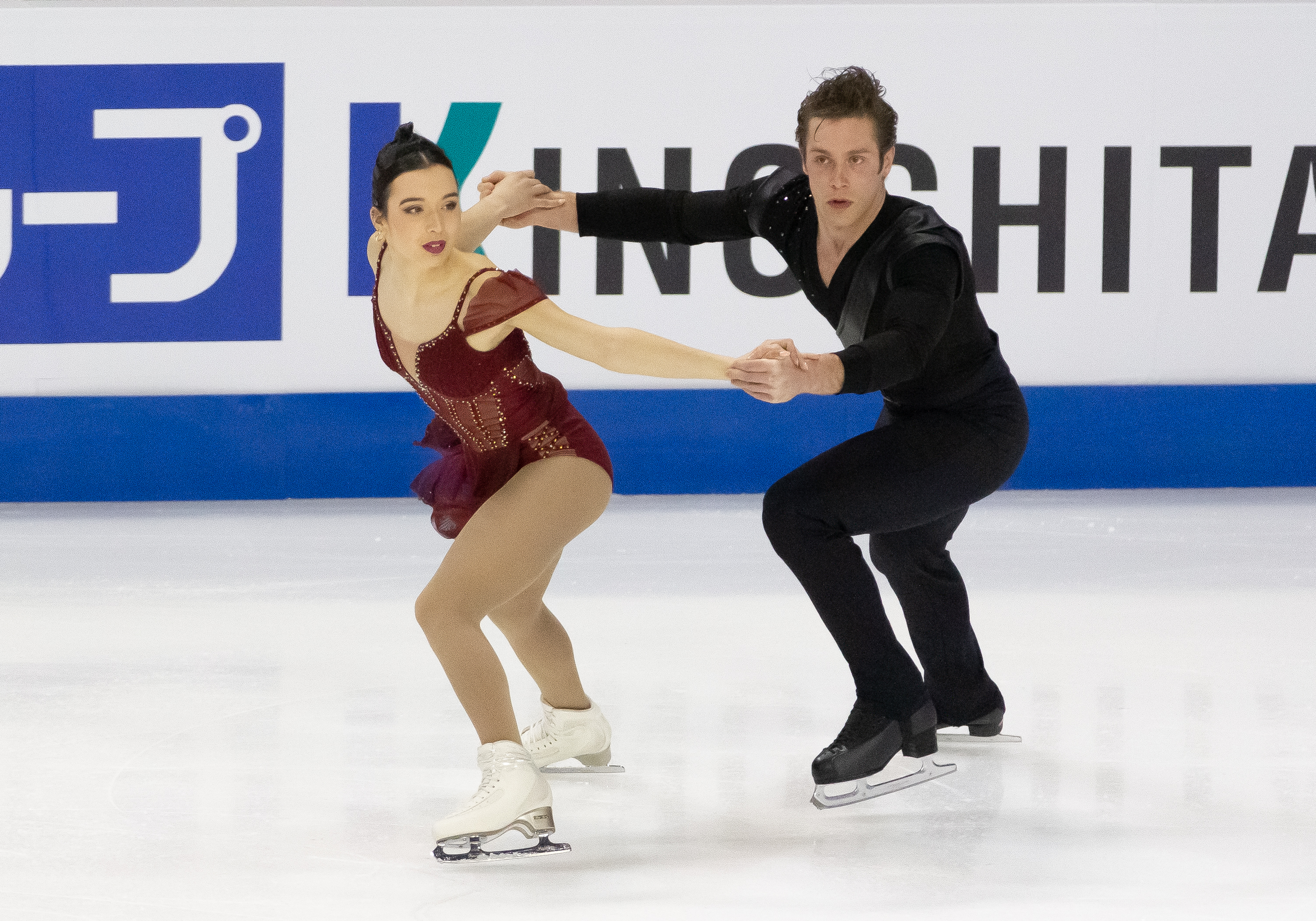
Pereira and Michaud at the 2023 Four Continents Championships

Due to the scheduling of the 2023 Canadian Championships, Pereira was required to compete two short programs and two free skates on consecutive days. On the first day, she finished second in the women's short program with a score of 61.21 points, 7.11 points behind the reigning national champion Madeline Schizas. Pereira/Michaud were fourth in the pairs short program, 1.01 points behind third-place finishers Laurin/Éthier. She dropped to fifth in the women's event after the free skate, then taking an afternoon nap before returning for the pairs final. There, Pereira/Michaud overtook Laurin/Éthier for the bronze medal. She said afterwards that because this was only their fourth competition as a team, "we're learning a lot every time we come out." The team was assigned to compete at both the 2023 Four Continents Championships and the 2023 World Championships.

At the Four Continents Championships in Colorado Springs, Pereira/Michaud placed fourth in the short program with a clean skate. They were fourth in the free skate as well, with their only error being Michaud doubling their planned triple Salchow. They both indicated that they were pleased with how the competition had gone, as they continued to gain experience. Pereira said that she was uncertain whether she would continue competing as a singles skater. Concluding their season at the 2023 World Championships in Saitama, the duo ranked sixth overall, including a notable fourth place finish in the free skate. This was Pereira's first visit to Japan.

==== 2023–24 season: Two Grand Prix medals and Grand Prix Final debut ====
In advance of the 2023–24 season, Pereira opted to focus only on competing in pairs, explaining that "after our success last season, we have big goals together, so I want to put my 100% all into that." At their first competition, the 2023 CS Nebelhorn Trophy, Pereira/Michaud came fourth, 0.07 points behind German bronze medalists Hocke/Kunkel. Following the event, she commented that "the whole experience was really enjoyable and we're happy with both of our programs and the outcome."

Pereira/Michaud were invited to make their ISU Grand Prix debut at the 2023 Skate America. She remarked on the occasion that "this time last year I was watching the Skate America pairs event to learn the pair rules, so to be here is pretty cool." They skated a clean short program, placing second in the segment, producing a clean triple twist, a side by side triple toe loop and a throw triple loop to post a season's best of 63.22 points. They won the silver medal, after placing second in a free skate, which included a clean triple Salchow, a triple twist and a throw triple Salchow, despite Pereira falling on the double Axel in a sequence with a triple toe loop. At their second assignment, the 2023 Grand Prix de France, Pereira/Michaud skated a clean short program that included a set of triple toe loops, a triple twist, a throw triple loop and multiple level four elements. They achieved a new personal best of 65.97 points, coming 0.66 points ahead of the pre-event favourites, the reigning European champions Conti/Macii of Italy. In the free skate, Michaud fell on the double Axel at the end of his jump combination and stepped out of his triple Salchow, but the team still set another personal best to win that segment, which included a clean triple twist, a throw triple loop and a throw triple Salchow. This was their first Grand Prix gold medal. Michaud commented afterwards that "to know that what we've been putting into is paying off is a super rewarding feeling," and added that they "still have things to improve on.”

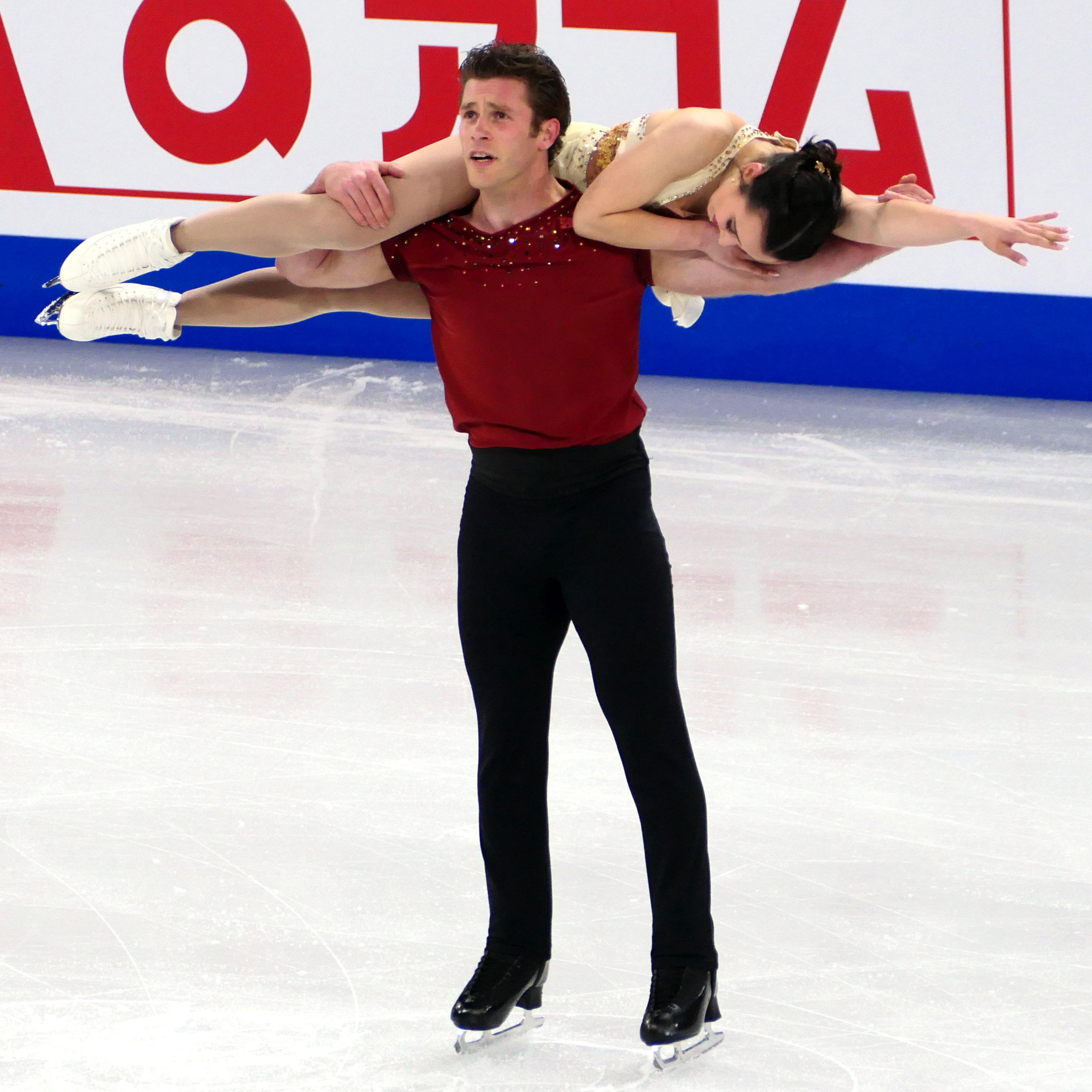
Pereira and Michaud in the ending pose for their free skate at the 2024 World Championships

The team's results qualified them for the 2023–24 Grand Prix Final in Beijing. Pereira/Michaud finished sixth in the short program, after Pereira fell on the throw triple loop, which she called an untypical error. They were sixth in the free skate as well after a lift error, which Michaud said he was annoyed by, but added that "overall, we are pretty pleased." Pereira viewed it as a new experience for the team to be coming back after a disappointing short program.

Following the conclusion of the Grand Prix series, Pereira and Michaud opted to revise their "River" short program to a softer version with different choreography, based on feedback from judges and other coaches. They finished second in the short program at the 2024 Canadian Championships, narrowly behind reigning national champions Stellato-Dudek/Deschamps. Jump and throw issues in the free skate saw them more distantly second in that segment, winning the silver medal.

Michaud injured his back shortly after the national championships, limiting the team's training ahead of the 2024 Four Continents Championships, where they finished fifth after performing downgraded content in the free skate. At the 2024 World Championships held on home ice in Montreal, Pereira/Michaud placed ninth in the short program, having skated cleanly but receiving only a level one on the triple twist. In the free skate, despite Pereira falling on the throw triple loop, they were seventh in that segment, moving up to eighth overall. Pereira called the fall "quite disappointing, just because we hoped for such a great moment, but there's still a lot of great things I can take away from this. It's an experience I'll remember forever."

==== 2024–25 season: Grand Prix bronze and Four Continents bronze ====
Pereira/Michaud began the season at the 2024 CS Nebelhorn Trophy. They struggled in the short program, coming seventh in that segment, but came third in the free skate and rose to fifth place overall. On the 2024–25 Grand Prix series, the team entered the 2024 Grand Prix de France as the defending champions, which Pereira cited as a new experience. Third in the short program with a clean performance, the free skate proved more difficult for the team, with Pereira falling on both the throw triple loop and the throw triple Salchow. They dropped to fifth place overall. At their second assignment, the 2024 Cup of China, the team fared better, placing third in both segments (including a personal best score in the short program), and won the bronze medal. During the short program, the team completed a triple twist, a throw triple Salchow, and a side-by-side triple Salchow, setting a personal best of 66.90 points. During the free skate, the team performed a side-by-side triple Salchow, a triple twist, a throw triple Salchow and level four twists. However, Pereira missed the throw triple loop, while Michaud stumbled on a double Axel. Pereira called it a "steppingstone" week.

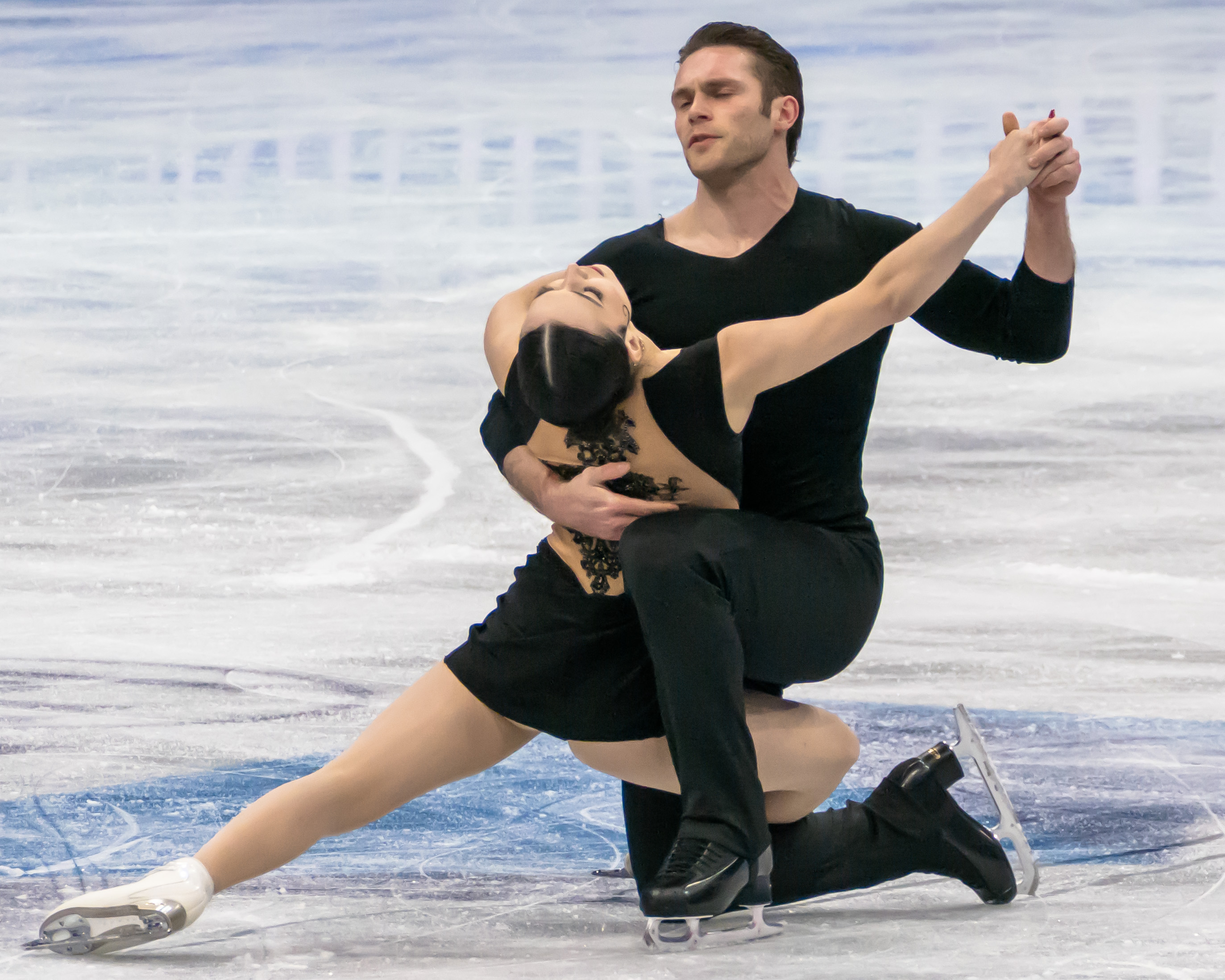
Pereira and Michaud finishing their free skate at the 2025 World Championships

At the 2025 Canadian Championships, Pereira/Michaud came second in the short program, behind reigning champions Stellato-Dudek/Deschamps. Scoring 70.43 points, it was their first time breaking the 70 point threshold at either a domestic or international competition. Despite falling on the throw triple loop, the team went on to win the free skate over Stellato-Dudek/Deschamps, but remained second overall, winning their second silver medal.

Upon arriving in Seoul for the 2025 Four Continents Championships, Pereira became "violently sick" and was unable to participate in the first practice session. She felt comfortable to compete, and Pereira/Michaud placed third in the short program with a clean skate, only 0.13 points clear of Stellato-Dudek/Deschamps in fourth and 0.53 points behind Americans Kam/O'Shea in second. Their program included a triple toe loop as well as a throw triple loop, and they achieved a new personal best of 69.79 points. They placed third in the free skate as well, being overtaken by their Canadian teammates, but themselves surpassing the Americans. With an overall personal best of 198.40 points, Pereira/Michaud won the bronze medal. This was Pereira's first international championship medal.

At the 2025 World Championships in Boston, Pereira/Michaud placed tenth in the short program and thirteenth in the free skate, finishing the event in eleventh place overall. Reflecting on the season, Pereira shared: "We, of course, learned so much this year. You learn from your wins, and you also learn from your losses. Every competition is experience gained, and that’s something we really enjoy, growing from every opportunity we have."

==== 2025–26 season: First national title, Milano Cortina Olympics, and World bronze ====
Pereira/Michaud opened their season by placing sixth at the 2025 CS Nebelhorn Trophy. They went on to compete in the 2025–26 Grand Prix series, placing fourth at the 2025 Skate Canada International and fifth at the 2025 Finlandia Trophy. In January, Pereira/Michaud competed at the 2026 Canadian Championships. They placed second in the short program and won the free skate, following an error-ridden program by heavy favourites, Stellato-Dudek/Deschamps. With this, they won their first national title. They were subsequently named to the 2026 Winter Olympic team.

On February 2, days before the start of the 2026 Winter Olympics Figure Skating Team Event, the Canadian Olympic Committee announced that Stellato-Dudek/Deschamps would be unable to participate, due to Stellato-Dudek sustaining an injury during training. As a result, Pereira/Michaud were selected to compete for Canada in both segments of the pairs portion in the team event. On February 6, Pereira/Michaud placed fourth in the short program with a score of 68.24, earning 7 points for Team Canada. They put out a clean program which featured good side-by-side triple toe loops and a throw triple loop. The triple twist, lift, footwork and death spiral were all graded a level four, but there were negative GOEs noted on the twist and flying camel spins. “We really put in a lot of work,” said Pereira. “I think today showed the work that we put in the usual elements that gave us some problems. Overall, I’m proud of both of us for handling our first team event together. We really felt the support from the box and the crowd.” The duo placed fifth in the free skate, earning 6 points for Team Canada and setting a new personal best of 134.42. During the short program of the individual event on February 15, Pereira/Michaud placed third, setting another personal best of 74.60. However the next day, the team struggled during the free skate, with Michaud taking a fall and Pereira slipping during the death spiral, placing tenth in that segment and dropping to eighth place overall.

The following month, Pereira/Michaud captured the bronze medal at the 2026 World Figure Skating Championships in Prague. This was the first World Championships medal for both Pereira and Michaud. They finished third in the short program and second in the free skate, winning small medals for both segments. During the short program, the team landed a clean triple toe loop and a throw triple loop, posting a new personal best of 75.52 points. During the free skate, Pereira/Michaud put out a performance that was highlighted by a triple twist, a triple toe loop-double Axel sequence and a throw triple Lutz, picking up another personal best of 140.57 points. “Those two programs are some of our favorite programs we’ve ever had,” said Michaud. “To finish both on such a high note was exactly what we came here to do. We knew if we did that, we could put ourselves into medal contention. I’m so proud of the two of us and also our team back home."

==== 2026–27 season ====
Pereira/Michaud began their season with a win at the 2026 CS Nebelhorn Trophy.

In October, they won gold at 2026 Skate Canada International. “We’re very pleased with both our performances at Skate Canada,” said Pereira after the event.

The following month, they placed second at 2026 Finlandia Trophy. “We’ve been experimenting with different setups for our throws and jumps, trying to figure out what gives us the best GOE and the best angle for the judges,” said Pereira of their programs.

Their combined placements at their two Grand Prix events qualified them for the 2026–27 Grand Prix of Figure Skating Final.

== Programs ==
=== Pair skating with Trennt Michaud ===
- Program details mentioned at first occurrence
- Winter Olympic seasons highlighted in blue
- Programs performed at the Winter Olympics highlighted in **bold**

Competition and exhibition programs by season
Season	Short program	Free skate program	Exhibition program
2022–23	"Where We Come Alive": Performed by Ruelle; Choreo. by Alison Purkiss	Pirates of the Caribbean: Composed by Hans Zimmer; Choreo. by Alison Purkiss; **Tracks used**: 1. "Singapore"; 2. "Drink Up Me Hearties"; 3. "Yo Ho"	Medley: 1. "Goo Goo Muck"; Performed by The Cramps; 2. "Bloody Mary"; Performed by Lady Gaga
2023–24	"River": Performed by Bishop Briggs; Choreo. by Alison Purkiss, Asher Hill	Gladiator: Composed by Hans Zimmer; Choreo. by Madison Hubbell, Adrián Díaz, Alison Purkiss; **Tracks used**: 1. "The Emperor Is Dead"; 2. "The Might of Rome"; 3. "Honor Him"; 4. "Now We Are Free"	"Stick Season": Performed by Noah Kahan
2023–24	"River": Performed by Bishop Briggs; Choreo. by Alison Purkiss, Asher Hill	Gladiator: Composed by Hans Zimmer; Choreo. by Madison Hubbell, Adrián Díaz, Alison Purkiss; **Tracks used**: 1. "The Emperor Is Dead"; 2. "The Might of Rome"; 3. "Honor Him"; 4. "Now We Are Free"	"Lift Me Up": From Black Panther: Wakanda Forever; Performed by Rihanna
2024–25	"Sing, Sing, Sing (with a Swing)": Composed by Louis Prima; Performed by Anita O'Day; Choreo. by Jean-Luc Baker, Olivia Smart, Alison Purkiss	Scent of a Woman: Composed by Thomas Newman; Choreo. by Madison Hubbell, Adrián Díaz, Alison Purkiss; **Tracks used**: 1. "Tango Jalousie" (by Jacob Gade, performed by Sakari Oramo & Vienna Philharmonic); 2. "Por una cabeza" (by Carlos Gardel & Alfredo Le Pera, performed by John Williams, Itzhak Perlman & Pittsburgh Symphony Orchestra)	"Sparkling Diamonds": From Moulin Rouge!; Composed by Jule Styne; Performed by Nicole Kidman
2025–26	**"Say You Love Me"**: Performed by Jessie Ware; Choreo. by Madison Hubbell, Adrián Díaz, Alison Purkiss	**Gladiator**	"Be Italian": From Nine; Performed by Fergie
2025–26	—N/a	The Mission: Composed by Ennio Morricone; Choreo. by Jean-Luc Baker, Olivia Smart, Alison Purkiss; **Tracks used**: 1. "Gabriel's Oboe" and "Miserere"; 2. "River" and "Guaraní"; 3. "Falls"; 4. "The Mission"; 5. "Prayer of the Fall" (by Karl Hugo)	—N/a

=== Women's singles ===
- Program details mentioned at first occurrence

Competition and exhibition programs by season
Season	Short program	Free skate program	Exhibition program
2021–22	"Listen to Your Heart": Composed by Per Gessle; Performed by Roxette; Choreo. by Asher Hill	"Ochi Chernye (Dark Eyes)": Composed by Yevhen Hrebinka; Choreo. by Asher Hill	—N/a
2022–23	"Stand by Me": Composed by Ben E. King; Performed by Florence + the Machine; Choreo. by Asher Hill	"Ochi Chernye (Dark Eyes)"	—N/a

== Competitive highlights ==
=== Pair skating with Trennt Michaud ===
- GP – Event of the ISU Grand Prix Series
- CS – Event of the ISU Challenger Series

Competition placements at senior level
Season	2022–23	2023–24	2024–25	2025–26	2026–27
Winter Olympics				8th	
Winter Olympics (Team event)				5th	
World Championships	6th	8th	11th	3rd	
Four Continents Championships	4th	5th	3rd		
Grand Prix Final		6th			TBD
Canadian Championships	3rd	2nd	2nd	1st	
GP Cup of China			3rd		
GP Finland				5th	2nd
GP France		1st	5th		
GP Skate America		2nd			
GP Skate Canada				4th	1st
CS Golden Spin of Zagreb	3rd				
CS Nebelhorn Trophy		4th	5th	6th	1st
Skate Canada Challenge	1st				

=== Women's singles ===
- JGP – Event of the ISU Junior Grand Prix Series
- CS – Event of the ISU Challenger Series

Competition placements at senior level
Season	2021–22	2022–23
Canadian Championships	10th	5th
CS Finlandia Trophy		15th
Skate Canada Challenge	4th	8th

Competition placements at junior level
Season	2020–21	2021–22	2022–23
World Junior Championships		14th	
JGP France			6th
JGP Russia		10th	
Challenge Cup		6th	
Cranberry Cup		5th	1st
Skate Canada Challenge	3rd		

== Detailed results ==
=== Pair skating with Trennt Michaud ===
- TSS – Total segment score highlighted in **bold**
- TES – Technical element score
- PCS – Program component score

ISU personal best scores in the +5/-5 GOE System
Segment	Type	Score	Event
Total	**TSS**	**216.09**	2026 World Championships
Short program	**TSS**	**75.52**	2026 World Championships
Short program	TES	42.27	2026 World Championships
Short program	PCS	33.25	2026 World Championships
Free skating	**TSS**	**140.57**	2026 World Championships
Free skating	TES	71.73	2026 World Championships
Free skating	PCS	68.84	2026 World Championships

=== Senior level ===
- Current personal best scores are highlighted in **bold**.
- Small medals for the short program and free skating are only awarded at ISU Championships.

Results in the 2022–23 season
Date	Event	SP		FS		Total		Details
Date	Event	P	Score	P	Score	P	Score	Details
Nov 30–Dec 3, 2022	2022–23 Skate Canada Challenge	2	61.49	1	120.73	1	182.22	Details
Dec 7–10, 2022	(Croatia) 2022 CS Golden Spin of Zagreb	4	61.13	3	115.75	3	176.88	Details
Jan 9–15, 2023	(Canada) 2023 Canadian Championships	4	64.60	3	111.93	3	176.53	Details
Feb 7–12, 2023	(United States) 2023 Four Continents Championships	4	65.16	4	121.17	4	186.33	Details
Mar 20–26, 2023	(Japan) 2023 World Championships	6	65.31	4	127.69	6	193.00	Details

Results in the 2023–24 season
Date	Event	SP		FS		Total		Details
Date	Event	P	Score	P	Score	P	Score	Details
Sep 20–23, 2023	(Germany) 2023 CS Nebelhorn Trophy	4	62.38	2	126.56	4	188.94	Details
Oct 20–22, 2023	(United States) 2023 Skate America	2	63.22	2	119.37	2	182.59	Details
Nov 3–5, 2023	2023 Grand Prix de France	1	65.97	1	128.70	1	194.67	Details
Dec 7–10, 2023	(China) 2023–24 Grand Prix Final	6	61.78	6	123.38	6	185.16	Details
Jan 7–14, 2024	(Canada) 2024 Canadian Championships	2	66.04	2	127.10	2	193.14	Details
Jan 29–Feb 4, 2024	(China) 2024 Four Continents Championships	6	59.89	5	122.16	5	182.05	Details
Mar 18–24, 2024	(Canada) 2024 World Championships	9	64.83	7	122.10	8	186.93	Details

Results in the 2024–25 season
Date	Event	SP		FS		Total		Details
Date	Event	P	Score	P	Score	P	Score	Details
Sep 19–21, 2024	(Germany) 2024 CS Nebelhorn Trophy	7	57.04	3	119.24	5	176.28	Details
Nov 1–3, 2024	2024 Grand Prix de France	3	64.38	5	106.29	5	170.67	Details
Nov 22–24, 2024	2024 Cup of China	3	66.90	3	121.84	3	188.74	Details
Jan 14–19, 2025	(Canada) 2025 Canadian Championships	2	70.43	1	134.53	2	204.96	Details
Feb 19–23, 2025	(South Korea) 2025 Four Continents Championships	3	69.79	3	128.61	3	198.40	Details
Mar 25–30, 2025	(United States) 2025 World Championships	10	63.28	13	116.22	11	179.50	Details

Results in the 2025–26 season
Date	Event	SP		FS		Total		Details
Date	Event	P	Score	P	Score	P	Score	Details
Sep 25–27, 2025	(Germany) 2025 CS Nebelhorn Trophy	11	60.35	5	123.22	6	183.57	Details
Oct 31–Nov 2, 2025	2025 Skate Canada International	3	70.66	5	115.88	4	186.54	Details
Nov 21–Nov 23, 2025	(Finland) 2025 Finlandia Trophy	4	70.13	6	121.20	5	191.33	Details
Jan 5–11, 2026	(Canada) 2026 Canadian Championships	2	69.11	1	135.03	1	204.14	Details
Feb 6–8, 2026	(Italy) 2026 Winter Olympics – Team event	4	68.24	5	134.42	5	—N/a	Details
Feb 15–16, 2026	(Italy) 2026 Winter Olympics	3	74.60	10	125.06	8	199.66	Details
Mar 24–29, 2026	(Czech Republic) 2026 World Championships	3	**75.52**	2	**140.57**	3	**216.09**	Details

=== Women's singles ===
- TSS – Total segment score highlighted in **bold**
- TES – Technical element score
- PCS – Program component score

ISU personal best scores in the +5/-5 GOE System
Segment	Type	Score	Event
Total	**TSS**	**158.86**	2022 World Junior Championships
Short program	**TSS**	**58.69**	2022 World Junior Championships
Short program	TES	32.72	2022 World Junior Championships
Short program	PCS	27.93	2022 CS Finlandia Trophy
Free skating	**TSS**	**103.96**	2022 JGP France
Free skating	TES	51.66	2022 JGP France
Free skating	PCS	53.30	2022 JGP France

=== Senior level ===
- Personal best scores are highlighted in **bold**.
- Small medals for the short program and free skating are only awarded at ISU Championships.

Results in the 2021–22 season
Date	Event	SP		FS		Total		Details
Date	Event	P	Score	P	Score	P	Score	Details
Dec 1–5, 2021	2021–22 Skate Canada Challenge	10	48.85	3	111.39	4	160.24	Details
Jan 6–13, 2022	(Canada) 2022 Canadian Championships	13	48.37	9	95.99	10	144.36	Details

Results in the 2022–23 season
Date	Event	SP		FS		Total		Details
Date	Event	P	Score	P	Score	P	Score	Details
Oct 5–9, 2022	(Finland) 2022 CS Finlandia Trophy	8	56.98	18	85.09	15	142.07	Details
Nov 30–Dec 3, 2022	2022–23 Skate Canada Challenge	9	53.68	7	98.44	8	152.12	Details
Jan 9–15, 2023	(Canada) 2023 Canadian Championships	2	61.21	7	104.62	5	165.83	Details

=== Junior level ===
- Personal best scores are highlighted in **bold**.
- Small medals for the short program and free skating are only awarded at ISU Championships.

Results in the 2020–21 season
Date	Event	SP		FS		Total		Details
Date	Event	P	Score	P	Score	P	Score	Details
Jan 8–17, 2021	2020–21 Skate Canada Challenge	4	49.27	4	87.58	3	136.85	Details

Results in the 2021–22 season
Date	Event	SP		FS		Total		Details
Date	Event	P	Score	P	Score	P	Score	Details
Aug 11–15, 2021	(United States) 2021 Cranberry Cup International	6	44.52	5	85.38	5	129.90	Details
Sep 15–18, 2021	2021 JGP Russia	9	53.51	11	88.92	10	142.43	Details
Feb 24–27, 2022	(Netherlands) 2022 International Challenge Cup	7	48.08	3	100.43	6	148.51	Details
Apr 13–17, 2022	(Estonia) 2022 World Junior Championships	12	**58.69**	13	100.17	14	**158.86**	Details

Results in the 2022–23 season
Date	Event	SP		FS		Total		Details
Date	Event	P	Score	P	Score	P	Score	Details
Aug 9–14, 2022	(United States) 2022 Cranberry Cup International	1	56.41	1	112.64	1	169.05	Details
Aug 24–27, 2022	2022 JGP France	10	50.63	6	**103.96**	6	154.59	Details
