= 2025 Four Continents Figure Skating Championships =

International figure skating competition

2025 Four Continents Championships
- Type: ISU Championship
- Date: February 19 – February 23
- Season: 2024–25
- Location: Seoul, South Korea
- Host: Korean Skating Union
- Venue: Mokdong Ice Rink

Champions
- Men's singles: (Kazakhstan) Mikhail Shaidorov
- Women's singles: (South Korea) Kim Chae-yeon
- Pairs: (Japan) Riku Miura and Ryuichi Kihara
- Ice dance: (Canada) Piper Gilles and Paul Poirier
- Previous: 2024 Four Continents Championships
- Next: 2026 Four Continents Championships

The 2025 Four Continents Figure Skating Championships took place from February 19 to February 23, 2025, at the Mokdong Ice Rink in Seoul, South Korea. Medals were awarded in men's singles, women's singles, pair skating, and ice dance.

The competition was awarded to South Korea in January 2023 and was originally scheduled from February 4–9. In April 2024, it was rescheduled to February 18–23.

== Qualification ==
Nations from non-European countries were able to send three entries at most for each discipline.

=== Age and minimum TES requirements ===
The competition was open to skaters from all non-European member nations of the International Skating Union. The corresponding competition for European skaters was the 2025 European Championships.

Skaters were eligible for the 2025 Four Continents Championships if they turned 17 years of age before July 1, 2024, and met the minimum technical elements score requirements. The ISU accepted scores if they were obtained at senior-level ISU-recognized international competitions during the ongoing season at least 21 days before the first official practice day of the championships or during the two preceding seasons.

Minimum technical scores
Discipline	CTES
Men	86
Women	75
Pairs	75
Ice dance	85

== Schedule ==
Schedule
Date	Disc.	Time	Segment
Thursday, 20 February	Pairs	11:50	Short program
Thursday, 20 February	Ice dance	14:30	Rhythm dance
Thursday, 20 February	Men	18:00	Short program
Friday, 21 February	Pairs	14:50	Free skate
Friday, 21 February	Women	18:00	Short program
Saturday, 22 February	Men	13:00	Free skate
Saturday, 22 February	Ice dance	18:00	Free dance
Sunday, 23 February	Women	11:00	Free Program
Sunday, 23 February	—N/a	17:00	Exhibition

- All times are listed in local time (UTC+09:00).

== Entries ==
Member nations began announcing their selections in December 2024. The International Skating Union released the official list of entrants on 27 January 2025.

Entries
Country	Men	Women	Pairs	Ice dance
Australia	Douglas Gerber	Maria Chernyshova	Anastasia Golubeva; Hektor Giotopoulos Moore	Holly Harris; Jason Chan
Australia	Darian Kaptich	—N/a		
Canada	Aleksa Rakic	Sara-Maude Dupuis	Kelly Ann Laurin; Loucas Ethier	Alicia Fabbri; Paul Ayer
Canada	Matthew Newnham	Katherine Medland Spence	Lia Pereira; Trennt Michaud	Piper Gilles; Paul Poirier
Canada	Roman Sadovsky	Madeline Schizas	Deanna Stellato-Dudek; Maxime Deschamps	Marjorie Lajoie; Zachary Lagha
China	Chen Yudong	An Xiangyi	—N/a	Ren Junfei; Xing Jianing
China	Dai Daiwei	Chen Hongyi	—N/a	Xiao Zixi; He Linghao
China	Peng Zhiming	Zhu Yi	—N/a	—N/a
Chinese Taipei	Yu-Hsiang Li	—N/a		
Hong Kong	Chiu Hei Cheung	—N/a		
India	—N/a	Tara Prasad	—N/a	
Japan	Kao Miura	Mone Chiba	Riku Miura; Ryuichi Kihara	Azusa Tanaka; Shingo Nishiyama
Japan	Kazuki Tomono	Wakaba Higuchi	Yuna Nagaoka; Sumitada Moriguchi	Utana Yoshida; Masaya Morita
Japan	Tatsuya Tsuboi	Rino Matsuike	—N/a	
Kazakhstan	Dias Jirenbayev	Sofiya Farafonova	—N/a	Gaukhar Nauryzova; Boyisangur Datiev
Kazakhstan	Mikhail Shaidorov	Sofia Samodelkina	—N/a	—N/a
Malaysia	Ze Zeng Fang	—N/a		—N/a
Mexico	Donovan Carrillo	—N/a		Harlow Lynella Stanley; Seiji Urano
Philippines	Paolo Borromeo	Sofia Lexi Jacqueline Frank	Isabella Gamez; Aleksandr Korovin	—N/a
South Africa	—N/a	Gian-Quen Isaacs	—N/a	
South Korea	Cha Jun-hwan	Kim Chae-yeon	—N/a	Hannah Lim; Ye Quan
South Korea	Kim Hyun-gyeom	Lee Hae-in	—N/a	—N/a
South Korea	Lee Si-hyeong	Yun Ah-sun	—N/a	—N/a
United States	Tomoki Hiwatashi	Sarah Everhardt	Alisa Efimova; Misha Mitrofanov	Christina Carreira; Anthony Ponomarenko
United States	Jimmy Ma	Alysa Liu	Ellie Kam; Daniel O'Shea	Madison Chock; Evan Bates
United States	Camden Pulkinen	Bradie Tennell	Audrey Shin; Balázs Nagy	Emilea Zingas; Vadym Kolesnik
Uzbekistan	—N/a		Ekaterina Geynish; Dmitrii Chigirev	—N/a

=== Changes to preliminary assignments ===
Date	Discipline	Withdrew	Added	Notes	Ref.
January 25	Women	(United States) Amber Glenn	(United States) Bradie Tennell		
January 29	Men	(United States) Andrew Torgashev	(United States) Jimmy Ma		
February 1	Men	(United States) Maxim Naumov	(United States) Tomoki Hiwatashi		
February 4	Women	(Kazakhstan) Anna Levkovets			
February 13	Ice Dance	(Brazil); Natalia Pallu-Neves; Jayin Panesar		Injury	
February 14	Men	(Hong Kong) Heung Lai Jarke Zhao			
February 15	Men	(Canada) Wesley Chiu	(Canada) Matthew Newnham		

== Medal summary ==
=== Medalists ===
Medals awarded to the skaters who achieved the highest overall placements in each discipline:

Discipline	Gold	Silver	Bronze
Men	(Kazakhstan); Mikhail Shaidorov	(South Korea); Cha Jun-hwan	(United States); Jimmy Ma
Women	(South Korea); Kim Chae-yeon	(United States); Bradie Tennell	(United States); Sarah Everhardt
Pairs	(Japan); Riku Miura; Ryuichi Kihara	(Canada); Deanna Stellato-Dudek; Maxime Deschamps	(Canada); Lia Pereira; Trennt Michaud
Ice dance	(Canada); Piper Gilles; Paul Poirier	(United States); Madison Chock; Evan Bates	(Canada); Marjorie Lajoie; Zachary Lagha

Small medals awarded to the skaters who achieved the highest short program or rhythm dance placements in each discipline:

Discipline	Gold	Silver	Bronze
Men	(Kazakhstan); Mikhail Shaidorov	(United States); Jimmy Ma	(Japan); Kazuki Tomono
Women	(South Korea); Kim Chae-yeon	(Japan); Mone Chiba	(United States); Sarah Everhardt
Pairs	(Japan); Riku Miura; Ryuichi Kihara	(United States); Ellie Kam; Danny O'Shea	(Canada); Lia Pereira; Trennt Michaud
Ice dance	(Canada); Piper Gilles; Paul Poirier	(United States); Madison Chock; Evan Bates	(Canada); Marjorie Lajoie; Zachary Lagha

Small medals awarded to the skaters who achieved the highest free skating or free dance placements in each discipline:

Discipline	Gold	Silver	Bronze
Men	(Kazakhstan); Mikhail Shaidorov	(South Korea); Cha Jun-hwan	(United States); Jimmy Ma
Women	(South Korea); Kim Chae-yeon	(United States); Bradie Tennell	(United States); Sarah Everhardt
Pairs	(Japan); Riku Miura; Ryuichi Kihara	(Canada); Deanna Stellato-Dudek; Maxime Deschamps	(Canada); Lia Pereira; Trennt Michaud
Ice dance	(United States); Madison Chock; Evan Bates	(Canada); Piper Gilles; Paul Poirier	(Canada); Marjorie Lajoie; Zachary Lagha

=== Medals by country ===
Table of medals for overall placement:

Rank	Nation	Gold	Silver	Bronze	Total
1	Canada	1	1	2	4
2	South Korea	1	1	0	2
3	Japan	1	0	0	1
3	Kazakhstan	1	0	0	1
5	United States	0	2	2	4
Totals (5 entries)		4	4	4	12

== Results ==
=== Men's singles ===
Men's results
Rank	Skater	Nation	Total	SP		FS	
1st place, gold medalist(s)	Mikhail Shaidorov	Kazakhstan	285.10	1	94.73	1	190.37
2nd place, silver medalist(s)	Cha Jun-hwan	South Korea	265.02	4	79.24	2	185.78
3rd place, bronze medalist(s)	Jimmy Ma	United States	245.01	2	82.52	3	162.49
4	Kazuki Tomono	Japan	242.08	3	79.84	4	162.24
5	Tatsuya Tsuboi	Japan	234.93	6	78.07	5	156.86
6	Kao Miura	Japan	230.48	5	78.80	7	151.68
7	Kim Hyun-gyeom	South Korea	226.12	8	73.62	6	152.50
8	Camden Pulkinen	United States	217.25	16	65.79	8	151.46
9	Tomoki Hiwatashi	United States	214.79	15	65.88	9	148.91
10	Roman Sadovsky	Canada	213.90	9	78.74	11	141.05
11	Donovan Carrillo	Mexico	208.73	13	68.50	12	140.23
12	Matthew Newnham	Canada	205.34	7	73.81	14	131.53
13	Dai Daiwei	China	204.88	11	70.11	13	134.77
14	Yu-Hsiang Li	Chinese Taipei	204.29	17	61.87	10	142.42
15	Peng Zhiming	China	198.96	10	70.21	15	128.75
16	Aleksa Rakic	Canada	197.91	12	69.35	16	128.56
17	Chen Yudong	China	183.66	14	67.45	18	116.21
18	Darian Kaptich	Australia	175.67	18	56.60	17	119.07
19	Dias Jirenbayev	Kazakhstan	166.34	20	52.97	19	113.37
20	Douglas Gerber	Australia	160.49	21	48.90	20	111.59
21	Chiu Hei Cheung	Hong Kong	159.52	19	54.73	22	104.79
22	Ze Zeng Fang	Malaysia	152.03	22	46.37	21	105.66
WD	Paolo Borromeo	Philippines	Withdrew from competition				
WD	Lee Si-hyeong	South Korea	Withdrew from competition				

=== Women's singles ===
Women's results
Rank	Skater	Nation	Total	SP		FS	
1st place, gold medalist(s)	Kim Chae-yeon	South Korea	222.38	1	74.02	1	148.36
2nd place, silver medalist(s)	Bradie Tennell	United States	204.38	5	66.58	2	137.80
3rd place, bronze medalist(s)	Sarah Everhardt	United States	200.03	3	67.36	3	132.67
4	Alysa Liu	United States	198.55	4	67.09	4	131.46
5	Wakaba Higuchi	Japan	195.16	7	65.10	5	130.06
6	Mone Chiba	Japan	195.08	2	71.20	7	123.88
7	Sofia Samodelkina	Kazakhstan	193.37	8	63.98	6	129.39
8	Lee Hae-in	South Korea	183.10	10	60.77	8	122.33
9	Yun Ah-sun	South Korea	182.68	6	65.57	10	117.11
10	Sara-Maude Dupuis	Canada	178.36	9	62.35	12	116.01
11	Rino Matsuike	Japan	177.10	13	55.07	9	122.03
12	Madeline Schizas	Canada	176.47	11	59.70	11	116.77
13	An Xiangyi	China	163.92	12	57.63	13	106.29
14	Katherine Medland Spence	Canada	156.95	14	53.02	14	103.93
15	Zhu Yi	China	151.93	15	48.38	15	103.55
16	Tara Prasad	India	143.01	17	47.39	16	95.62
17	Chen Hongyi	China	138.70	16	47.57	17	91.13
18	Gian-Quen Isaacs	South Africa	123.54	18	44.79	18	78.75
19	Sofia Lexi Jacqueline Frank	Philippines	115.39	20	41.78	19	73.61
20	Sofiya Farafonova	Kazakhstan	104.20	19	42.02	21	62.18
21	Maria Chernyshova	Australia	102.91	21	40.59	20	62.32

=== Pairs ===
Pairs' results
Rank	Team	Nation	Total	SP		FS	
1st place, gold medalist(s)	Riku Miura; Ryuichi Kihara	Japan	217.32	1	74.73	1	142.59
2nd place, silver medalist(s)	Deanna Stellato-Dudek; Maxime Deschamps	Canada	210.92	4	69.66	2	141.26
3rd place, bronze medalist(s)	Lia Pereira; Trennt Michaud	Canada	198.40	3	69.79	3	128.61
4	Ellie Kam; Daniel O'Shea	United States	196.94	2	70.32	4	126.62
5	Alisa Efimova; Misha Mitrofanov	United States	192.07	5	67.59	5	124.48
6	Anastasia Golubeva; Hektor Giotopoulos Moore	Australia	178.76	6	65.36	7	113.40
7	Yuna Nagaoka; Sumitada Moriguchi	Japan	174.76	9	57.29	6	117.47
8	Ekaterina Geynish; Dmitrii Chigirev	Uzbekistan	172.44	8	61.94	8	110.50
9	Kelly Ann Laurin; Loucas Ethier	Canada	170.23	7	62.90	9	107.33
10	Isabella Gamez; Alexander Korovin	Philippines	150.08	11	50.95	10	99.13
11	Audrey Shin; Balázs Nagy	United States	128.36	10	51.70	11	76.66

=== Ice dance ===
Ice dance results
Rank	Team	Nation	Total	RD		FD	
1st place, gold medalist(s)	Piper Gilles; Paul Poirier	Canada	218.46	1	87.22	2	131.24
2nd place, silver medalist(s)	Madison Chock; Evan Bates	United States	217.93	2	86.21	1	131.72
3rd place, bronze medalist(s)	Marjorie Lajoie; Zachary Lagha	Canada	201.04	3	82.86	3	118.18
4	Christina Carreira; Anthony Ponomarenko	United States	197.08	4	79.30	4	117.78
5	Emilea Zingas; Vadym Kolesnik	United States	188.55	5	74.63	5	113.92
6	Hannah Lim; Ye Quan	South Korea	184.02	6	72.37	6	111.65
7	Holly Harris; Jason Chan	Australia	178.12	7	69.37	7	108.75
8	Utana Yoshida; Masaya Morita	Japan	166.56	8	65.00	9	101.56
9	Alicia Fabbri; Paul Ayer	Canada	166.49	10	60.06	9	101.56
10	Xiao Zixi; He Linghao	China	157.43	9	62.36	12	95.07
11	Azusa Tanaka; Shingo Nishiyama	Japan	156.39	12	59.84	10	96.55
12	Ren Junfei; Xing Jianing	China	155.25	11	59.88	11	95.37
13	Gaukhar Nauryzova; Boyisangur Datiev	Kazakhstan	127.57	13	49.40	13	78.17
14	Harlow Lynella Stanley; Seiji Urano	Mexico	121.95	14	46.71	14	75.24
