= 2024 Grand Prix de France =

Figure skating competition

- Type: Grand Prix
- Date: November 1 – 3
- Season: 2024–25
- Location: Angers, France
- Host: Fédération Française des Sports de Glace
- Venue: Angers IceParc

Champions
- Men's singles: (France) Adam Siao Him Fa
- Women's singles: (United States) Amber Glenn
- Pairs: (Germany) Minerva Fabienne Hase and Nikita Volodin
- Ice dance: (France) Evgenia Lopareva and Geoffrey Brissaud
- Previous: 2023 Grand Prix de France
- Next: 2025 Grand Prix de France
- Previous Grand Prix: 2024 Skate Canada International
- Next Grand Prix: 2024 NHK Trophy

The 2024 Grand Prix de France was the third event of the 2024–25 ISU Grand Prix of Figure Skating: a senior-level international invitational competition series. It was held at the Angers IceParc in Angers from November 1–3. Medals were awarded in men's singles, women's singles, pair skating, and ice dance. Skaters also earned points toward qualifying for the 2024–25 Grand Prix Final.

== Entries ==
The International Skating Union announced the preliminary assignments on June 9, 2024.

Country	Men	Women	Pairs	Ice dance
Belgium	—	Nina Pinzarrone	—	
Canada	—		Lia Pereira; Trennt Michaud	Marie-Jade Lauriault; Romain Le Gac
China	Jin Boyang	—		
Czech Republic	—			Kateřina Mrázková; Daniel Mrázek
Estonia	Aleksandr Selevko	—		
France	Luc Economides	Lorine Schild	Aurélie Faula; Théo Belle	Marie Dupayage; Thomas Nabais
France	François Pitot	Léa Serna	Camille Kovalev; Pavel Kovalev	Natacha Lagouge; Arnaud Caffa
France	Adam Siao Him Fa	Clémence Mayindu	—	Evgenia Lopareva; Geoffrey Brissaud
Georgia	—	Anastasiia Gubanova	—	
Germany	—		Minerva Fabienne Hase; Nikita Volodin	—
Italy	Nikolaj Memola	—	Sara Conti; Niccolò Macii	Charlène Guignard; Marco Fabbri
Italy	—	—	Rebecca Ghilardi; Filippo Ambrosini	—
Japan	Koshiro Shimada	Wakaba Higuchi	—	
Japan	Kazuki Tomono	Mai Mihara	—	
Japan	—	Rion Sumiyoshi	—	
Lithuania	—			Allison Reed; Saulius Ambrulevičius
Kazakhstan	Mikhail Shaidorov	—		
South Korea	—	Kim Chae-yeon	—	
Switzerland	Lukas Britschgi	Livia Kaiser	—	
United States	Camden Pulkinen	Amber Glenn	Alisa Efimova; Misha Mitrofanov	Emily Bratti; Ian Somerville
United States	Andrew Torgashev	Sarah Everhardt	—	Leah Neset; Artem Markelov
United States	—		—	Eva Pate; Logan Bye
Uzbekistan	—		Ekaterina Geynish; Dmitrii Chigirev	—

=== Changes to preliminary assignments ===
Discipline	Withdrew		Added		Notes	Ref.
Discipline	Date	Skater(s)	Date	Skater(s)	Notes	Ref.
Pairs	—		July 11	(France); Aurélie Faula; Théo Belle	Host picks	
Pairs	September 13	(China); Peng Cheng; Wang Lei	September 17	(United States); Alisa Efimova; Misha Mitrofanov		
Pairs	September 17	(France); Océane Piegad; Denys Strekalin	September 24	(Uzbekistan); Ekaterina Geynish; Dmitrii Chigirev	Split	
Ice dance	—		September 17	(France); Natacha Lagouge; Arnaud Caffa	Host picks	
Women	—		September 17	(France); Maïa Mazzara	Host picks	
Women	October 17	(Belgium); Loena Hendrickx	October 18	(United States); Sarah Everhardt		
Women	October 22	(France); Maïa Mazzara	October 22	(France); Clémence Mayindu		

== Results ==
=== Men's singles ===
Men's results
Rank	Skater	Nation	Total points	SP		FS	
1st place, gold medalist(s)	Adam Siao Him Fa	France	246.58	8	74.90	1	171.68
2nd place, silver medalist(s)	Koshiro Shimada	Japan	233.84	5	80.42	3	153.42
3rd place, bronze medalist(s)	Andrew Torgashev	United States	233.64	4	81.54	4	152.10
4	Mikhail Shaidorov	Kazakhstan	231.86	6	79.89	5	151.97
5	Kazuki Tomono	Japan	231.48	3	83.45	6	148.03
6	Nikolaj Memola	Italy	227.62	10	68.71	2	158.91
7	Aleksandr Selevko	Estonia	226.11	2	85.73	7	140.38
8	Jin Boyang	China	219.05	1	88.12	11	130.93
9	Lukas Britschgi	Switzerland	212.94	7	77.09	9	135.85
10	Luc Economides	France	205.55	9	69.66	8	135.89
11	Camden Pulkinen	United States	193.60	11	64.48	12	129.12
12	François Pitot	France	183.17	12	48.94	10	134.23

=== Women's singles ===
Women's results
Rank	Skater	Nation	Total points	SP		FS	
1st place, gold medalist(s)	Amber Glenn	United States	210.44	1	78.14	3	132.30
2nd place, silver medalist(s)	Wakaba Higuchi	Japan	206.08	3	66.98	1	139.10
3rd place, bronze medalist(s)	Rion Sumiyoshi	Japan	201.35	5	66.88	2	134.47
4	Kim Chae-yeon	South Korea	199.99	2	70.90	5	129.09
5	Sarah Everhardt	United States	196.94	4	66.95	4	129.99
6	Nina Pinzarrone	Belgium	184.67	6	62.72	6	121.95
7	Mai Mihara	Japan	174.93	7	61.12	8	113.81
8	Anastasiia Gubanova	Georgia	173.21	9	56.77	7	116.44
9	Livia Kaiser	Switzerland	168.27	8	58.35	9	109.92
10	Lorine Schild	France	164.32	10	56.51	10	107.81
11	Léa Serna	France	160.91	11	54.78	11	106.13
12	Clemence Mayindu	France	121.43	12	44.64	12	76.79

=== Pairs ===
Pairs' results
Rank	Team	Nation	Total points	SP		FS	
1st place, gold medalist(s)	Minerva Fabienne Hase; Nikita Volodin	Germany	211.69	1	73.72	1	137.97
2nd place, silver medalist(s)	Sara Conti; Niccolò Macii	Italy	203.39	2	70.79	2	132.60
3rd place, bronze medalist(s)	Rebecca Ghilardi; Filippo Ambrosini	Italy	176.62	6	60.74	3	115.88
4	Alisa Efimova; Misha Mitrofanov	United States	171.92	4	64.08	4	107.84
5	Lia Pereira; Trennt Michaud	Canada	170.67	3	64.38	5	106.29
6	Ekaterina Geynish; Dmitrii Chigirev	Uzbekistan	161.99	5	61.38	7	100.61
7	Camille Kovalev; Pavel Kovalev	France	157.04	7	54.81	6	102.23
8	Aurélie Faula; Théo Belle	France	128.72	8	41.50	8	87.22

=== Ice dance ===
Ice dance results
Rank	Skater	Nation	Total points	RD		FD	
1st place, gold medalist(s)	Evgenia Lopareva; Geoffrey Brissaud	France	195.27	2	77.75	1	117.52
2nd place, silver medalist(s)	Charlène Guignard; Marco Fabbri	Italy	189.08	1	82.20	5	106.88
3rd place, bronze medalist(s)	Emily Bratti; Ian Somerville	United States	185.88	4	72.81	2	113.07
4	Allison Reed; Saulius Ambrulevičius	Lithuania	185.24	3	74.49	4	110.75
5	Kateřina Mrázková; Daniel Mrázek	Czech Republic	183.05	7	71.54	3	111.51
6	Leah Neset; Artem Markelov	United States	176.60	6	71.86	6	104.74
7	Marie-Jade Lauriault; Romain Le Gac	Canada	175.85	5	72.54	8	103.31
8	Natacha Lagouge; Arnaud Caffa	France	169.99	9	65.89	7	104.10
9	Eva Pate; Logan Bye	United States	168.76	8	71.47	9	97.29
10	Marie Dupayage; Thomas Nabais	France	161.20	10	64.03	10	97.17
