= Aiza Imambek =

Kazakh figure skater

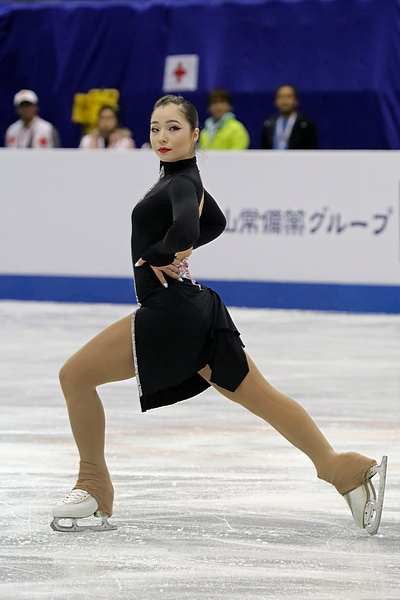

Personal information
- Native name: Айза Евфратқызы Имамбек
- Full name: Aiza Evfratkyzy Imambek
- Other names: Mambekova
- Born: 25 February 1999 (age 27) Almaty, Kazakhstan
- Height: 1.63 m (5 ft 4 in)

Figure skating career
- Country: Kazakhstan
- Coach: Kuralai Uzurova
- Skating club: Kiyal Almaty
- Began skating: 2003

Aiza Evfratkyzy Imambek or Mambekova (Kazakh: Айза Евфратқызы Имамбек,Aiza Evfratqyzy İmambek; born 25 February 1999) is a Kazakh figure skater. She is the 2019 Reykjavik International silver medalist, the 2018 FBMA Trophy bronze medalist, and a five-time Kazakhstani national silver medalist (2014–2018). She represented Kazakhstan at the 2018 Winter Olympics, placing 30th.

== Career ==
=== Early years ===
Imambek began learning to skate in 2003. Her first coach was Aigul Kuanysheva. She made her junior international debut in August 2012, at the Asian Figure Skating Trophy in Taipei, Taiwan.

During the 2014–2015 season, Imambek was coached by Galina Masliuk. Her first ISU Junior Grand Prix assignment took place in September 2014 in the Czech Republic. Her senior international debut came in December, at Estonia's Tallinn Trophy.

By the 2015–2016 season, Imambek was training under Kuralai Uzurova in Astana and Akbulak, Kazakhstan.

=== 2016–2017 season ===
Imambek qualified to the final segment at the 2017 Winter Universiade, held in February in Almaty, Kazakhstan; she ranked 16th in the short program, 10th in the free skate, and 13th overall. Later that month, she placed 8th at the 2017 Asian Winter Games in Sapporo, Japan.

In March, Imambek placed 31st in the short program at the 2017 World Junior Championships in Taipei, Taiwan. Due to Elizabet Tursynbayeva's result at the 2017 World Championships, Kazakhstan obtained two Olympic spots in ladies' figure skating. During the season, Imambek achieved the International Skating Union's minimum technical scores, making her eligible for one of the spots.

=== 2017–2018 season ===
Imambek decided to train with Uzurova in Almaty and with Alexei Mishin in Saint Petersburg, Russia. She missed the first part of the season due to a fracture in her foot. In December 2017, she was nominated to represent Kazakhstan at the Olympics.

In January, Imambek won the bronze medal at the FBMA Trophy in Abu Dhabi, United Arab Emirates, and placed 20th at the 2018 Four Continents Championships in Taipei, Taiwan. In February, she will compete at the 2018 Winter Olympics in Pyeongchang, South Korea.

== Programs ==
Season	Short program	Free skating
2019–2020	Corazón Espinado by Fher Olvera performed by Santana	Jumyr-Kylysh by Ulytau
2017–2019	Amanama by DJ Antoine, Timati; Hourshaker radio edit	Ker Oglu by Daulet Kerei
2016–2017	Tango Amore by Edvin Marton	Ker Oglu by Daulet Kerei
2014–2016	Aqqu (The Swan) by Nurguissa	Paint It Black by The Rolling Stones performed by Apocalyptica

== Competitive highlights ==
CS: Challenger Series; JGP: Junior Grand Prix

International
Event	12–13	13–14	14–15	15–16	16–17	17–18	18–19	19–20
Olympics						30th		
Four Continents						20th		21st
CS Asian Open								10th
CS Golden Spin							24th	18th
CS Mordovian				8th				
CS Ondrej Nepela								14th
CS Tallinn Trophy							20th	
Asian Games					8th			
Denis Ten Memorial								10th
FBMA Trophy					6th	3rd		
MNNT Cup								12th
Reykjavik International							2nd	
Tallinn Trophy			16th					
Universiade					13th		17th	
International: Junior
Junior Worlds					31st			
JGP Croatia			25th					
JGP Czech Republic			22nd					
JGP Estonia					10th			
JGP France					8th			
JGP Latvia				20th				
JGP Poland				19th				
Asian Trophy	11th							
Coupe du Printemps		12th						
Hamar Trophy			4th					
Santa Claus Cup		15th		14th				
Triglav Trophy		7th						
National
Kazakhstani Champ.	5th	1st	2nd	2nd	2nd	2nd	2nd	
J = Junior level; TBD = Assigned
