= Alana Toktarova =

Kazakh figure skater (born 2003)

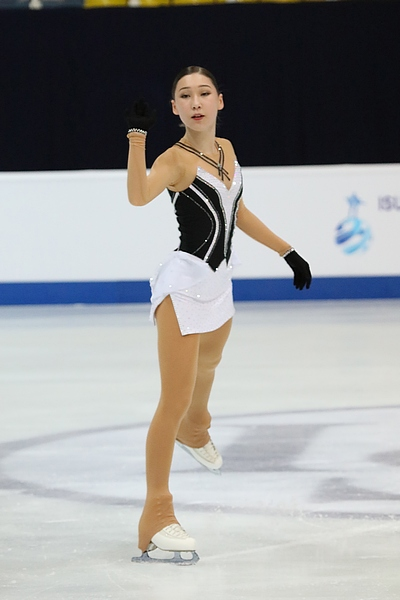

Personal information
- Born: 23 April 2003 (age 23) Taldykorgan, Kazakhstan
- Home town: Almaty, Kazakhstan
- Height: 1.60 m (5 ft 3 in)

Figure skating career
- Country: Kazakhstan
- Coach: Kuralai Uzurova
- Began skating: 2008

Alana Toktarova (born 23 April 2003) is a Kazakh figure skater. She is a two-time Kazakhstani national champion (2017, 2018). At the 2018 World Junior Championships, she qualified to the final segment and finished 22nd overall.

On the junior level, she is the 2018 Olympic Hopes champion, the 2018 FBMA Trophy silver medalist, the 2018 Golden Spin of Zagreb bronze medalist, and a three-time Kazakhstani junior national champion (2014-2016).

== Programs ==
Season	Short program	Free skating
2018–2019	Moonlight Serenade by Arthur Fiedler; Swing, Swing, Swing by Keely Smith	Nella Fantasia by Ennio Morricone performed by Jackie Evancho
2017–2018	Moonlight Serenade by Arthur Fiedler; Swing, Swing, Swing by Keely Smith	Roméo et Juliette; Roméo et Juliette Waltz by Charles Gounod
2016–2017	What a Wonderful World by Bob Thiele, George David Weiss	Roméo et Juliette; Roméo et Juliette Waltz by Charles Gounod

== Results ==
JGP: ISU Junior Grand Prix

Competition placements at senior level
Season	17–18	18–19	19–20
CS Asian Open			WD
Denis Ten Memorial			WD
EduSport Trophy		6th	
Istanbul Cup			WD
Kazakh Championships	1st	1st	

Competition placements at junior level
Season	14–15	15–16	16–17	17–18	18–19	19–20
World Junior Championships				22nd	31st	
JGP Belarus				19th		
JGP Germany			21st			
JGP Japan			11th			
JGP Latvia						21st
JGP Poland						25th
FBMA Trophy			4th	2nd		
Golden Spin					3rd	
Olympic Hopes				1st		
Open d'Andorra			3rd			
Kazakh Championships	1st	1st	1st			

== Detailed results ==
=== Senior level ===
Results in the 2019–20 season
Date	Event	SP		FS		Total	
Date	Event	P	Score	P	Score	P	Score
Oct 9–12, 2019	(Kazakhstan) 2019 Denis Ten Memorial	13	38.42	–	–	WD	–

Results in the 2018–19 season
Date	Event	SP		FS		Total	
Date	Event	P	Score	P	Score	P	Score
Jan 9–12, 2018=9	(Romania) 2018 EduSport Trophy	6	41.17	6	73.06	6	114.23

=== Junior level ===
Results in the 2019–20 season
Date	Event	SP		FS		Total	
Date	Event	P	Score	P	Score	P	Score
Sep 4–7, 2019	2019 JGP Latvia	23	41.58	21	76.90	21	118.48
Sep 18–21, 2018	2019 JGP Poland	30	35.37	20	73.82	25	109.19

Results in the 2018–19 season
Date	Event	SP		FS		Total	
Date	Event	P	Score	P	Score	P	Score
Nov 9–11, 2018	(Czech Republic) 2018 Prague Ice Cup	11	39.05	7	80.20	8	119.25
Dec 5–8, 2018	(Croatia) 2018 Golden Spin of Zagreb	4	45.36	3	85.16	3	130.52
Feb 4–10, 2019	(Croatia) 2019 World Junior Championships	31	42.50	–	–	31	42.50

Results in the 2017–18 season
Date	Event	SP		FS		Total	
Date	Event	P	Score	P	Score	P	Score
Sep 20–24, 2017	2017 JGP Belarus	14	42.53	22	64.76	19	107.29
Jan 4–7, 2018	(United Arab Emirates) 2018 FBMA Trophy	2	43.06	2	74.91	2	117.97
Feb 14–18, 2018	(Romania) 2018 Olympic Hopes	1	46.17	1	89.16	1	135.33
Feb 5–11, 2018	(Bulgaria) 2018 World Junior Championships	22	48.28	22	78.99	22	127.27

Results in the 2016–17 season
Date	Event	SP		FS		Total	
Date	Event	P	Score	P	Score	P	Score
Sep 7–11, 2016	2016 JGP Japan	12	42.18	11	78.13	11	120.31
Oct 5–9, 2016	2016 JGP Germany	19	43.35	21	74.61	21	117.96
Nov 16–20, 2016	(Spain) 2016 Open d'Andorra	3	38.03	3	69.59	3	107.62
Feb 5–7, 2017	(United Arab Emirates) 2017 FBMA Trophy	4	30.76	3	61.99	4	92.75
