= Kazakh Figure Skating Championships =

Recurring figure skating competition

- Status: Active
- Genre: National championships
- Frequency: Annual
- Country: Kazakhstan
- Organizer: Kazakhstan Skating Union

The Kazakh Figure Skating Championships are an annual figure skating competition organized by the Kazakhstan Skating Union to crown the national champions of Kazakhstan. Medals are awarded in men's singles, women's singles, pair skating, and ice dance at the senior and junior levels, although each discipline may not necessarily be held every year due to a lack of participants. Skaters from neighboring countries such as Uzbekistan and Kyrgyzstan have frequently competed as guests.

At the 2014 Kazakh Championships in Astana, Elizabet Tursynbaeva was forced to withdraw from the competition when it was discovered that she was not old enough to compete in the senior-level event; she was only 13 at the time. Tursynbaeva had been in the lead, but Aiza Imambek ended up winning the competition.

== Senior medalists ==
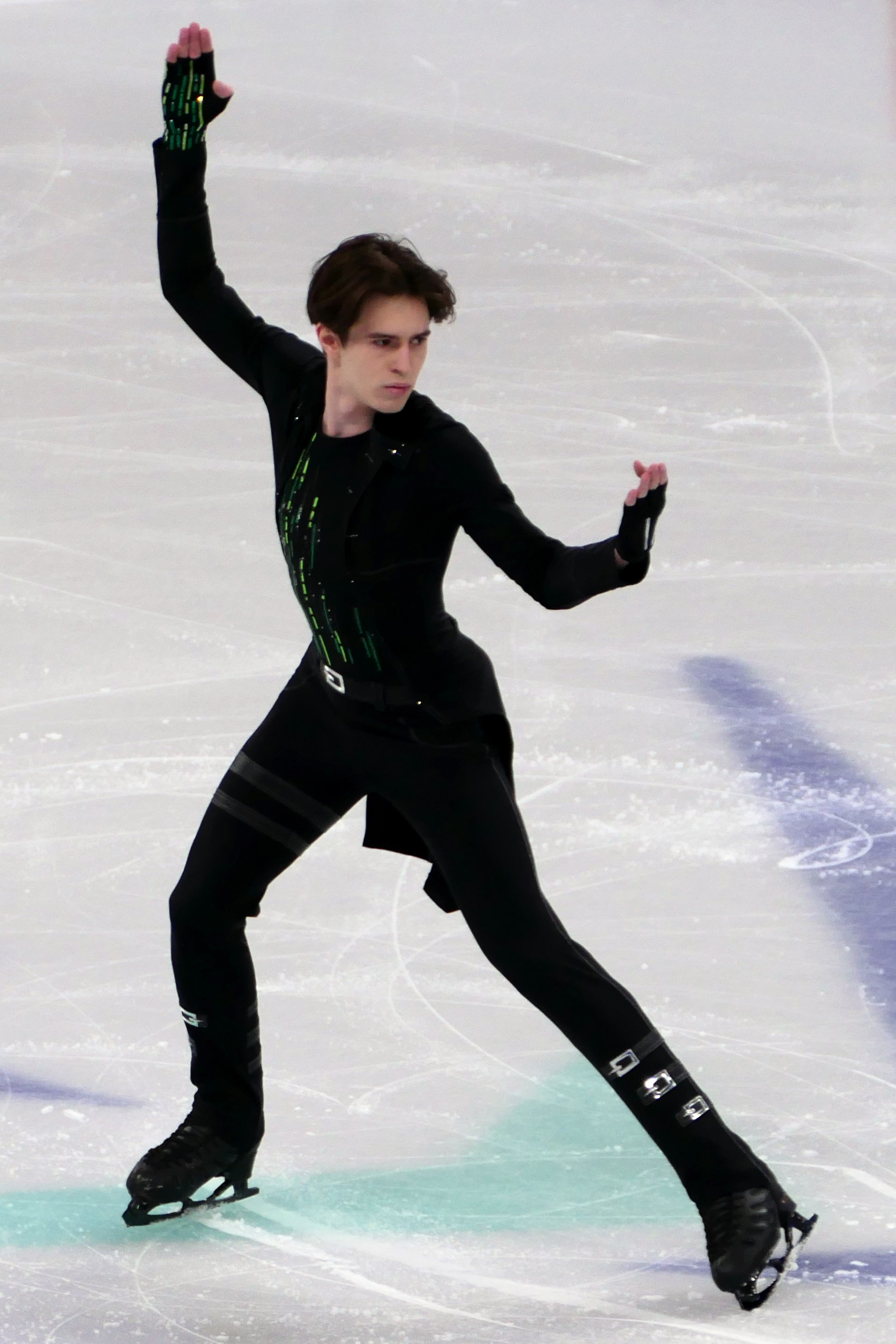
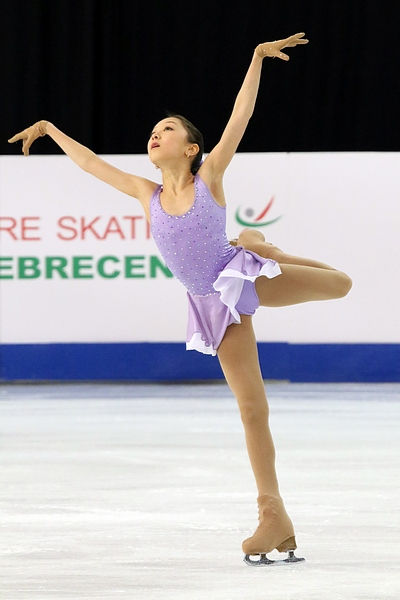
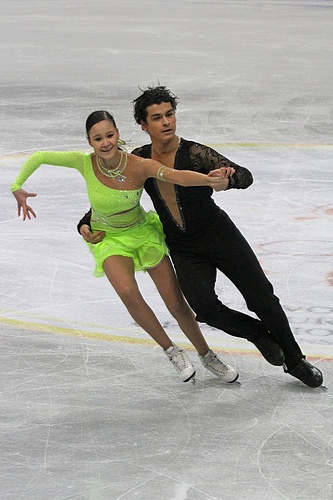
From left to right: Mikhail Shaidorov, five-time Kazakh champion in men's singles; Elizabet Tursynbayeva, three-time Kazakh champion in women's singles; and Karina Uzurova and Ilias Ali, five-time Kazakh champions in ice dance

=== Men's singles ===
Denis Ten, the 2006 Kazakh champion, was murdered in July 2018 by carjackers in Almaty. The Denis Ten Memorial Challenge, named in his honor, debuted in 2019 at the Halyk Arena in Almaty. Since 2021, it has been a regular event of the ISU Challenger Series.

Men's event medalists
Year	Location	Gold	Silver	Bronze	Ref.
1994		Juri Litvinov			
1995		Juri Litvinov			
1996		Juri Litvinov			
1997		Juri Litvinov			
1998		Juri Litvinov			
1999		Juri Litvinov			
2000		Stanislav Shaidorov			
2001		Juri Litvinov	Stanislav Shaidorov	Sergei Morozov	
2002		Juri Litvinov			
2003		Juri Litvinov	Iliyas Galymzhan	Stanislav Gusev	
2004	Astana	Iliyas Galymzhanov	Artem Khramov	Stanislav Gusev	
2005		Stanislav Gusev	Artem Khramov	Pavel Martinov	
2006		Denis Ten	Abzal Rakimgaliev	Artem Khramov	
2007		Abzal Rakimgaliev	Denis Ten	Artem Khramov	
2008–09	No competitions held				
2010	Oral	Adil Zharbolov		Artem Khramov	
2011	Astana	Vladimir Rudi			
2012	Shymkent	Artem Khramov	Abish Baitkanov	Adil Zharbolov	
2013	Astana	Abish Baitkanov	No other competitors		
2014	Astana	Daniyar Adylov	Abish Baitkanov	Alexander Lyan	
2015	Kyzylorda	Abzal Rakimgaliev	Daniyar Adylov	Artur Panikhin	
2016	Kyzylorda	Daniyar Adylov	Artur Panikhin	Andrei Lebedev	
2017	Almaty	Artur Panikhin	Melis Khakimov	Nikita Manko	
2018	Astana				
2019	Aktobe	Nikita Manko	Rakhat Bralin	Vsevolod Fil	
2020	Almaty	Mikhail Shaidorov	Rakhat Bralin	Dias Jirenbayev	
2021	Almaty	Mikhail Shaidorov	Dias Jirenbayev	Dimitry Karpukhin	
2022	Almaty	Mikhail Shaidorov	Dias Jirenbayev	Rakhat Bralin	
2023	Kostanay	Mikhail Shaidorov	Dias Jirenbayev	Rakhat Bralin	
2024	Almaty	Mikhail Shaidorov	Rakhat Bralin	Dias Jirenbayev	
2025	Karaganda	Dias Jirenbayev	Nikita Krivosheyev	Artur Smagulov	
2026	Pavlodar	Oleg Melnikov	Dias Jirenbayev	Nikita Krivosheev	

=== Women's singles ===
Women's event medalists
Year	Location	Gold	Silver	Bronze	Ref.
1994					
1995					
1996					
1997					
1998					
1999					
2000					
2001		Marina Khalturina	Alexandra Belousova	Ksenia Dolgopolova	
2002					
2003		Svetlana Bakachova	Alexandra Belousova	Natalia Knyaseva	
2004	Astana	Natalia Knyaseva	Nadezhda Paretskaia	Alexandra Belousova	
2005		Nadezhda Paretskaia	Antonina Vypelseva	Ekaterina Motireva	
2006		Nadezhda Paretskaia	Alexandra Belousova	Ekaterina Motireva	
2007		Marina Shishkina	Nadezhda Paretskaia	Antonina Vypelseva	
2008–09	No competitions held				
2010	Oral	Kristina Prilepko			
2011	Astana	Kristina Prilepko			
2012	Shymkent	Regina Glazman	Aigul Kozhamkulova	Karina Uraimova	
2013	Astana	Aigul Kozhamkulova	Regina Glazman	Ekaterina Malyuk	
2014	Astana	Aiza Imambek	Regina Glazman	Irina Vorzheva	
2015	Kyzylorda	Elizabet Tursynbayeva	Aiza Imambek	Regina Glazman	
2016	Kyzylorda	Elizabet Tursynbayeva	Aiza Imambek	Alina Sydykova	
2017	Almaty	Elizabet Tursynbayeva	Aiza Imambek	Alexandra Sayutina	
2018	Astana	Alana Toktarova	Aiza Imambek	Zhansaya Adykhanova	
2019	Aktobe	Alana Toktarova	Aiza Mambekova	Veronika Shevelev	
2020	Almaty	Aiza Mambekova	Azhar Zhumakhanova	Yasmin Tekik	
2021	Almaty	Mariya Grechanaya	Azhar Zhumakhanova	Anastassiya Lobanova	
2022	Almaty	Anna Levkovets	Bagdana Rakhishova	Yeva Nabozhenko	
2023	Kostanay	Anna Levkovets	Nuriya Suleimen	Sofiya Farafonova	
2024	Almaty	Anna Levkovets			
2025	Karaganda	Sofia Samodelkina	Zere Sarbalina	Sofiya Farafonova	
2026	Pavlodar	Amir Irmatov	Zere Sarbalina	Nuria Suleimen	

=== Pairs ===
Pairs event medalists
Year	Location	Gold	Silver	Bronze	Ref.
2000		Valeriy Artyuchov; Marina Khalturina			
2001		Irina Potanina; Konstantin Emshanov	Irina Chebanova; Almas Dautbekov	Ekaterina Romanova; Evgenii Belenko	
2002					
2003–07	No pairs competitors				
2008–09	No competitions held				
2010					
2011	Astana	Victoria Kucherenko; Victor Adoniev	No other competitors		
2012–15	No pairs competitors				
2016	Kyzylorda	Ekaterina Khokhlova; Abish Baytkanov	No other competitors		
2017–18	No pairs competitors				
2019	Aktobe	Zhansaya Zdykhanova; Abish Baitkanov	No other competitors		
No pairs competitors since 2019

=== Ice dance ===
Ice dance event medalists
Year	Location	Gold	Silver	Bronze	Ref.
2001		Elena Diukova; Sergei Veselov	Anna Sagaida; Pavel Misiurin	Tatiana Khripkova; Vadom Laturnus	
2002					
2003		No ice dance competitors			
2004	Astana	Ekaterina Gvozdkova; Timur Alaskhanov	Aida Tairova; Ruslan Potimoshnov	Viktoria Salnikova; Adil Zharbolov	
2005–07	No ice dance competitors				
2008–09	No competitions held				
2010		Viktoriya Kucherenko; Sergey Adonyev	Nellya Kasyanova; Ruslan Potamoshnev	Karina Uzurova; Ilias Ali	
2011	Astana	Karina Uzurova; Ilias Ali	No other competitors		
2012	Shymkent	Karina Uzurova; Ilias Ali	Cortney Mansour; Daryn Zhunussov	Viktoriya Kucherenko; Viktor Adonyev	
2013	Astana	Karina Uzurova; Ilias Ali	M. Yerzhanova; Temirlan Yerzhanov	A. Rimkulova; M. Kan	
2014	Astana	Karina Uzurova; Ilias Ali	Kseniya Korobkova; Daryn Zhunussov	No other competitors	
2015	Kyzylorda	Karina Uzurova; Ilias Ali	No other competitors		
2016	Kyzylorda	Anastasiia Khromova; Daryn Zhunussov	Karina Uzurova; Aaron Chapplain	Hannah Grace Cook; Temirlan Yerzhanov	
2017	Almaty	Hannah Grace Cook; Temirlan Yerzhanov	Gaukhar Nauryzova; Baisangur Datiev	No other competitors	
2018	Astana	No ice dance competitors			
2019	Aktobe	Gaukhar Nauryzova; Baisangur Datiev	Maxine Weatherby; Temirlan Yerzhanov	No other competitors	
2020	Almaty	No ice dance competitors			
2021	Almaty	Maxine Weatherby; Temirlan Yerzhanov	Gaukhar Nauryzova; Baisangur Datiev	No other competitors	
2022	Almaty				
2023	Kostanay	No ice dance competitors			
2024	Almaty				
2025	Karaganda	No ice dance competitors			
2026	Pavlodar	Gaukhar Nauryzova; Baisangur Datiev	No other competitors		

== Junior medalists ==
=== Men's singles ===
Junior men's event medalists
Year	Location	Gold	Silver	Bronze	Ref.
2011	Almaty	Georgy Klochko	Temirlan Yerzhanov	Timur Baibekov	
2012	Shymkent	Temirlan Yerzhanov	Vadim Kopkoev	Andrei Lebedev	
2013	Astana	Vadim Kopkoev	Andrei Lebedev	Daniyar Adilov	
2014	Astana	Nikita Manko	Rakhat Bralin	Dias Nurmet	
2015	Kyzylorda	Nikita Manko	Moldiyar Yesseyev	Dias Nurmet	
2016	Kyzylorda	Nikita Manko	Moldiyar Yesseyev	Vsevolod Fil	
2017	Almaty	Rakhat Bralin	Vsevolod Fil	Eylissey Volkov	
2018	Astana	Rakhat Bralin	Dias Jirenbayev	Mikhail Shaidorov	
2019	Aktobe	Dias Jirenbayev	Eylissey Volkov	Dmitry Karpukhin	
2020	Almaty	Simon Geiko	Nikita Krivosheyev	Danil Rychkov	
2021	Almaty	Oleg Melnikov	Artur Smagulov	Nikita Krivosheyev	
2022	Almaty	Oleg Melnikov	Nikita Krivosheyev	Artur Smagulov	
2023	Kostanay				
2024	Almaty	Artur Smagulov			
2025	Karaganda	Temirlan Jakijaev	Nikita Kozlov	Ansar Ismuhambetov	
2026	Pavlodar	Nikita Kozlov	Kenan Berdibaev	Jahongir Abylkasymov	

=== Women's singles ===
Junior women's event medalists
Year	Location	Gold	Silver	Bronze	Ref.
2011	Almaty	Aiza Imambek	Alina Yangucha	Elizaveta Tebieva	
2012	Shymkent	Elizabet Tursynbaeva	Aiza Imambek	Diana Vernykh	
2013	Astana	Aiza Imambek	Sofia Moon	Camilla Moigyarov	
2014	Astana	Alana Toktarova	Alina Asauova	Akerke Mendulla	
2015	Kyzylorda	Alana Toktarova	Alina Sydykova	Dana Tursimbaeva	
2016	Kyzylorda	Alana Toktarova	Gulzhan Zhumadilova	Elya Temirova	
2017	Almaty	Alana Toktarova	Gulzhan Zhumadilova	Daria Sirotina	
2018	Astana	Azhar Zhumakhanova			
2019	Aktobe	Mariya Grechanaya	Yasmin Tekik	Diana Suleimenova	
2020	Almaty	Mariya Grechanaya	Sabina Nassyrova	Anna Levkovets	
2021	Almaty	Anna Levkovets	Sabina Nassyrova	Sofiya Farafonova	
2022	Almaty	Sofiia Kovalenko	Zere Sarbalina	Anastasiya Ehgelgardt	
2023	Kostanay				
2024	Almaty	Ekaterina Baluba		Sofiia Kovalenko	
2025	Karaganda	Veronika Kim	Anna Sannikova	Karina Sheina	
2026	Pavlodar	Karina Sheina	Safija Abaeva	Maria Sannikova	

=== Ice dance ===
Junior ice dance event medalists
Year	Location	Gold	Silver	Bronze	Ref.
2025	Karaganda	No junior ice dance competitors			
2026	Pavlodar	Eva Nabozhenko; Rahat Bralin	No other competitors		
