= Maxine Weatherby =

American-Kazakhstani ice dancer

Personal information
- Born: April 7, 2001 (age 25) Changsha, China
- Home town: West Palm Beach, Florida, U.S.
- Height: 5 ft 3 in (1.60 m)

Figure skating career
- Country: Azerbaijan (since 2024); Kazakhstan (2018–22)
- Discipline: Ice dance
- Partner: Olexandr Kolosovskiy (since 2024); Temirlan Yerzhanov (2018–22)
- Coach: Evgeni Platov; John Kerr
- Skating club: Skating Club of Florida
- Began skating: 2004
Representing Kazakhstan
Kazakhstani Championships
Gold medal – first place	2020 Almaty	Ice dance
Gold medal – first place	2021 Almaty	Ice dance
Silver medal – second place	2019 Almaty	Ice dance

Maxine Weatherby (born April 7, 2001) is an ice dancer currently competing for Azerbaijan. Competing for Kazakhstan with her formerskating partner, Temirlan Yerzhanov, she is the 2020 Kazakhstani national champion and the 2019 Denis Ten Memorial Challenge bronze medalist. They competed in the final segment at the 2020 Four Continents Championships.

== Personal life ==
Weatherby was born on April 7, 2001, in Changsha, China. She was adopted at age 11 months by American parents from South Florida. Weatherby works as a skating coach at Palm Beach Ice Works in West Palm Beach, where she also trains.

== Career ==
=== Early career ===
Weatherby began skating in 2004. She competed in ladies' singles for nine years before switching to pairs. With Mickey Sinthawachiwa, she finished ninth in intermediate pairs at the 2014 U.S. Championships. During the 2016–17 season, Weatherby and Jonathan Kim finished fourth in novice pairs at the Pacific Coast Sectionals to qualify for the 2017 U.S. Championships, but they withdrew and did not compete. She switched to ice dance the following season with Dmitriy Bogomol as her partner. Weatherby/Bogomol finished seventh in novice dance at the 2018 U.S. Championships. They competed at one event during the 2018–19 season, the 2018 Chesapeake Open, before splitting.

Weatherby teamed up with Temirlan Yerzhanov to represent his native Kazakhstan in July 2018. They had previously known each other while training in Coral Springs, Florida, and tried out on the suggestion of Weatherby's mother. Weatherby/Yerzhanov train under Evgeni Platov in West Palm Beach and John Kerr in Pembroke Pines. Although Weatherby represents Kazakhstan, the federation does not cover her expenses due to her being American by nationality.

During their first season together in 2018–19, Weatherby/Yerzhanov won the silver medal at the 2019 Kazakhstani Championships behind Gaukhar Nauryzova / Boyisangur Datiev and finished eighth at the Bavarian Open.

=== 2019–2020 season ===
Weatherby/Yerzhanov opened their season at the Lake Placid Ice Dance International, where they placed 12th. They then finished eighth at the 2019 CS U.S. Classic. At the Denis Ten Memorial Challenge in October, Weatherby/Yerzhanov won their first international medal, bronze behind Germans Katharina Müller / Tim Dieck and Adelina Galyavieva / Louis Thauron of France. They also earned the technical minimums to compete at the 2020 Four Continents Championships and 2020 World Championships. After the event, Yerzhanov said he had always "dreamed of skating in Kazakhstan" and competing in front of his family. Weatherby/Yerzhanov won the national title at the 2020 Kazakhstani Championships.

At Four Continents, Weatherby/Yerzhanov were 16th in the rhythm dance and 15th in the free dance to finish 16th overall. The World Championships were cancelled due to the COVID-19 pandemic. During the ensuing lockdown, Weatherby/Yerzhanov trained separately for a time due to rinks being closed in Florida, before eventually meeting up to practice lifts off-ice.

=== 2020–2021 season ===
There were limited opportunities to compete due to the pandemic. Weatherby/Yerzhanov planned to compete at the 2021 World Championships if they were not cancelled, but were missing from the initial entry list.

== Programs ==
With Yerzhanov

Season	Rhythm dance	Free dance
2024–2025	Come and Get Your Love; by L. Vegas, John Fogerty	Kill Bill (soundtrack); by Nancy Sinatra, Tomoyasu Hotei and Santa Esmeralda
2023–2024		
2022–2023	Did not compete this season	
2021–2022		
2020–2021		
2019–2020	Quickstep: Hot Honey Rag (from Chicago) by John Kander; Blues: Bei Mir Bistu Shein by Jacob Jacobs, Sholom Secunda performed by Swing Kids; Quickstep: Bei Mir Bistu Shein choreo. by Zhanna Palagina	Halo by Beyoncé performed by Madilyn Bailey; Torn by Nathan Lanier choreo. by John Kerr
2018–2019		

== Competitive highlights ==
- CS – Event of the ISU Challenger Series

=== Ice dance with Oleksandr Kolosovskyi (for Azerbaijan) ===
Competition placements at senior level
Season	2024-25	2025-26	2026–27
CS Denis Ten Memorial	14th		
CS Trialeti Trophy		12th	
CS Trophée Métropole Nice	18th		
CS Trialeti Trophy			18th
EduSport Trophy	3rd		
Lake Placid Ice Dance		18th	
Santa Claus Cup	11th	10th	
Denkova-Staviski Cup		WD	12th

=== Ice dance with Temirlan Yerzhanov (for Kazakhstan) ===
Competition placements at senior level
Season	2018–19	2019–20	2020–21	2021–22
Four Continents Championships		16th		
Kazakhstani Championships		2nd	1st	1st
CS U.S. Classic		8th		
Bavarian Open	8th			
Denis Ten Memorial		3rd		
Lake Placid Ice Dance		12th		

== Detailed results ==
ISU Personal Bests highlighted in bold.

=== With Kolosovskyi for Azerbaijan ===
Results in the 2024–25 season
Date	Event	SP		FS		Total	
Date	Event	P	Score	P	Score	P	Score
Oct 3–5, 2024	(Kazakhstan) 2024 CS Denis Ten Memorial Challenge	14	53.52	15	80.63	14	134.15

Results in the 2025–26 season
Date	Event	RD		FD		Total	
Date	Event	P	Score	P	Score	P	Score
July 29–31, 2025	(United States) 2025 Lake Placid Ice Dance International	20	42.88	17	79.81	18	122.69
Oct 8–11, 2025	(Georgia (country)) 2025 CS Trialeti Trophy	13	55.92	10	86.79	12	142.71
Nov 7-9, 2025	(Bulgaria) 2025 Denkova-Staviski Cup	15	54.54	-	-	WD	-
Nov 26–30, 2025	(Hungary) 2025 Santa Claus Cup	11	55.35	10	88.98	10	144.33

Results in the 2026–27 season
Date	Event	RD		FD		Total	
Date	Event	P	Score	P	Score	P	Score
Oct 1–4, 2026	(Georgia (country)) 2026 CS Trialeti Trophy	18	47.18	18	73.63	18	120.81
Nov 6–8, 2026	(Bulgaria) 2026 Denkova-Staviski Cup	11	55.44	11	86.41	12	151.95

=== With Yerzhanov for Kazakhstan ===
2019–20 season
Date	Event	RD	FD	Total
February 4–9, 2020	2020 Four Continents Championships	16; **50.33**	15; **81.94**	16; **132.27**
October 9–12, 2019	2019 Denis Ten Memorial Challenge	3; 60.49	3; 95.68	3; 156.17
September 17–22, 2019	2019 CS U.S. International Classic	9; 46.93	8; 78.32	8; 125.25
Jul. 30 – Aug. 2, 2019	2019 Lake Placid Ice Dance International	13; 42.00	12; 65.03	12; 107.03
2018–19 season
Date	Event	RD	FD	Total
February 5–10, 2019	2019 Bavarian Open	10; 50.64	8; 78.45	8; 129.09

== Detailed results ==
ISU personal best scores in the +5/-5 GOE System
Segment	Type	Score	Event
Total	TSS	132.27	2020 Four Continents Championships
Rhythm dance	TSS	50.33	2020 Four Continents Championships
Rhythm dance	TES	28.54	2020 Four Continents Championships
Rhythm dance	PCS	21.79	2020 Four Continents Championships
Free dance	TSS	81.94	2020 Four Continents Championships
Free dance	TES	47.26	2020 Four Continents Championships
Free dance	PCS	34.68	2020 Four Continents Championships
