= Anna Levkovets =

Kazakhstani figure skater

Personal information
- Native name: Анна Левковец
- Born: 25 May 2007 (age 19) Karaganda, Kazakhstan
- Home town: Astana, Kazakhstan
- Height: 1.58 m (5 ft 2 in)

Figure skating career
- Country: Kazakhstan
- Coach: Alexandra Brezhneva
- Skating club: Sports School 2, Astana
- Began skating: 2012

Anna Levkovets (Kazakh: Анна Левковец; born 25 May 2007) is a Kazakhstani figure skater. She is the 2022 CS Denis Ten Memorial Challenge silver medalist and the 2022 and 2023 Kazakhstani national champion.

== Personal life ==
Levkovets was born on 25 May 2007 in Karaganda, Kazakhstan.

== Programs ==
Season	Short program	Free skating
2022–2023	Supermassive Black Hole by Muse choreo. by Alexander Zolotarev, Liudmila Shaimardanova	Can't Help Falling in Love performed by Tommee Profitt choreo. by Alexander Zolotarev, Liudmila Shaimardanova
2021–2022	Run by Ludovico Einaudi choreo. by Liudmila Shaimardanova	The Nutcracker by Pyotr Ilyich Tchaikovsky choreo. by Liudmila Shaimardanova

== Competitive highlights ==
- JGP – Event of the ISU Junior Grand Prix Series
- CS – Event of the ISU Challenger Series
- WD - Withdrew from event

Competition placements at senior level
Season	2021–22	2022–23	2023-24	2024-25
Four Continents		16th	23rd	WD
Kazakh Championships	1st	1st	1st	8th
CS Budapest Trophy			23rd	
CS Denis Ten Memorial		2nd	9th	
CS Golden Spin of Zagreb		12th		
Union Trophy			3rd	3rd
Bosphorus Cup			8th	10th
Ephesus Cup			4th	

Competition placements at junior level
Season	2019-20	2020–21	2021–22	2022-23
World Junior Championships			29th	35th
Kazakh Championships	3rd	1st		
JGP Poland			14th	27th
Denis Ten Memorial			5th	
Ice Challenge				7th
Spring Star		9th		
Winter Star			2nd	
