= Shira Ichilov =

Israeli ice dancer (born 2002)

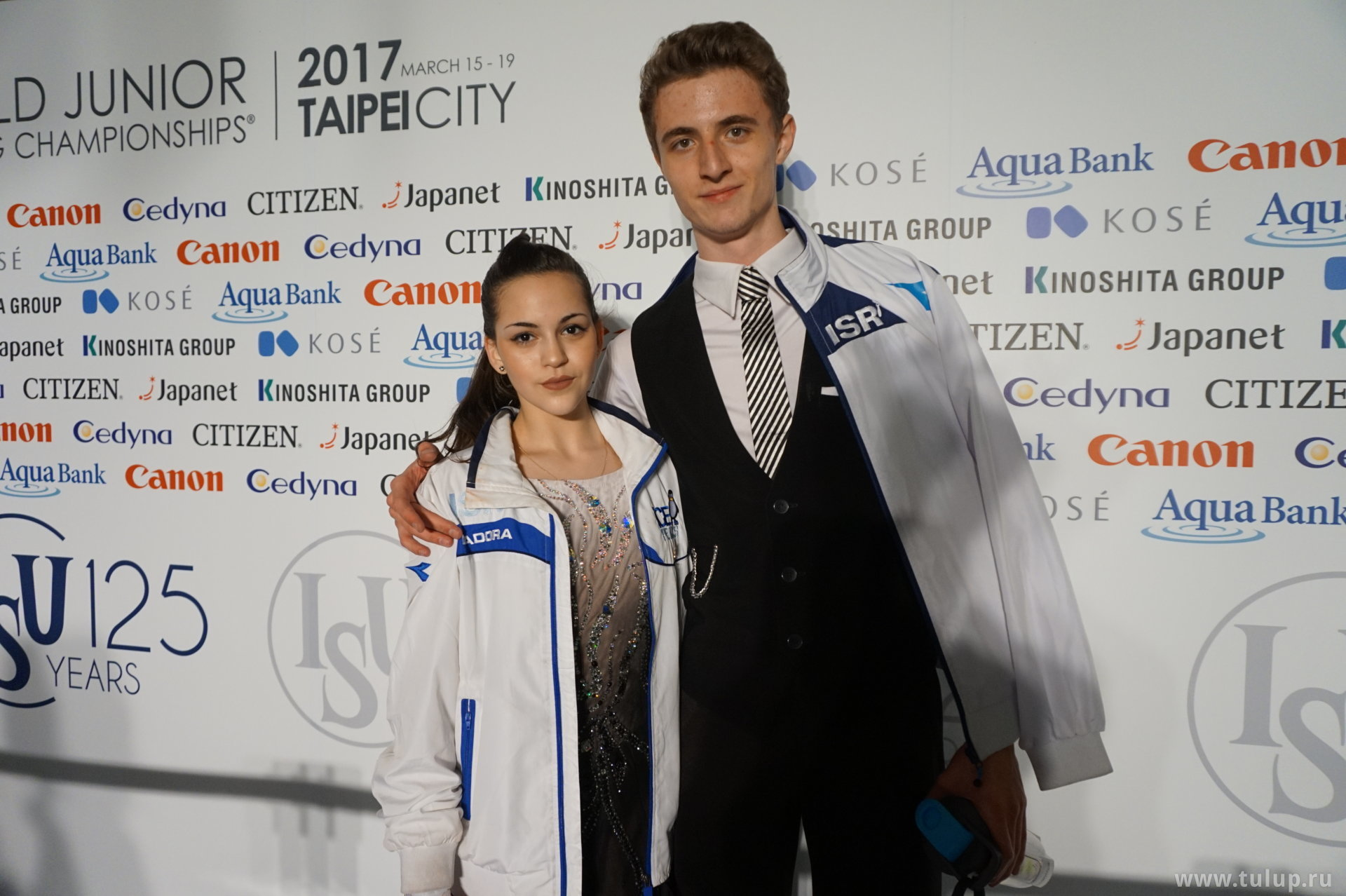
- Shira Ichilov and Vadzim Davoidovich in 2017

Personal information
- Native name: שירה איכילוב
- Born: 8 August 2002 (age 24) Tel Aviv, Israel
- Height: 1.60 m (5 ft 3 in)

Figure skating career
- Country: Israel
- Discipline: Ice dance
- Partner: Mikhail Nosovitskiy (since 2025); Dmytriy Kravchenko (2023-25); Volodymyr Byelikov (2021-22); Laurent Abecassis (2019-21); Vadim Davidovich (2016-19)
- Coach: Galit Chait Moracci
- Skating club: Ice Peaks
- Began skating: 2014

Shira Ichilov (Hebrew: שירה איכילוב; born 8 August 2002) is an Israeli ice dancer, who currently competes with Mikhail Nosovitskiy. With former partner Dmytriy Kravchenko, she is a two time Israeli national silver medalist. With her former partner, Laurent Abecassis she competed at the 2021 World Championships. With her former skating partner, Vadim Davidovich, she is the 2019 Israeli national champion and has competed in the final segment at two ISU Championships.

== Personal life ==
Shira Ichilov was born on 8 August 2002 in Tel Aviv, Israel.

== Career ==
=== 2016–2017 season ===
Ichilov began skating with Vadim Davidovich in July 2016, coached by Galit Chait in the U.S. In November, making their international debut, Ichilov/Davidovich finished tenth in junior ice dancing at the 2016 Tallinn Trophy. In March, they placed twenty-sixth in the short dance at the 2017 World Junior Championships in Taipei, Taiwan. Their placement was not sufficient to advance to the free dance.

=== 2017–2018 season ===
In September, Ichilov/Davidovich debuted on the ISU Junior Grand Prix series, finishing sixth in Salzburg, Austria, and then fourth in Riga, Latvia. After taking silver in the junior event at the 2017 Minsk-Arena Ice Star and placing fourth at the 2017 Golden Spin of Zagreb, they became the Israeli national junior champions. In March, the duo competed at the 2018 World Junior Championships in Sofia, Bulgaria; they qualified to the final segment and finished seventeenth overall. It was Davidovich's final season of age-eligibility for junior events.

=== 2018–2019 season ===
Making their senior international debut, Ichilov/Davidovich finished ninth at the 2018 CS Finlandia Trophy in October. They placed twelfth at the Volvo Open Cup and 10th at the 2018 CS Golden Spin of Zagreb before taking the Israeli national title.

In January, the two qualified to the free dance at the 2019 European Championships in Minsk, Belarus. They finished twentieth overall, having ranked twentieth in both segments. The two split following the 2019 World Championships, where they finished twenty-fifth in the rhythm dance and failed to qualify to the free dance.

=== 2019–2020 season ===
Ichilov partnered with France's Laurent Abecassis to compete for Israel. They placed twelfth at 2020 Egna Dance Trophy and then won gold at 2020 Jégvirág Cup. Ichilov/Abecassis were scheduled to make their World Championship debut at the 2020 edition in Montreal, but these were cancelled as a result of the COVID-19 pandemic.

=== 2020–2021 season ===
With the pandemic continuing to limit international competitions, Ichilov/Abecassis competed only at the 2021 World Championships in Stockholm, where they placed twenty-sixth in the rhythm dance and did not advance to the free dance.

=== 2021–2022 season ===
Ichilov/Abecassis competed at the 2021 CS Nebelhorn Trophy, seeking to qualify a berth for Israel at the 2022 Winter Olympics. They placed tenth at the event, outside of qualification. Afterward, Ichilov announced that their partnership had ended due to Abecassis deciding to retire from competitive skating.

Following the dissolution of her partnership, Ichilov formed a new partnership with Ukrainian ice dancer Volodymyr Byelikov. They debuted at the Israeli championships, winning the silver medal, before earning their international minimums at the Bavarian Open, placing sixth. They were fourth at the Egna Trophy, before making their World Championship debut at the 2022 World Championships in Montpellier. They placed twenty-first, and were the first team to miss qualifying for the free dance.

== Programs ==
=== With Byelikov ===
Season	Rhythm dance	Free dance
2021–2022	Rock: Robot Rock; Blues: I Feel It Coming; Funk: Stronger by Daft Punk choreo. by Galit Chait	S.O.S. d'un terrien en détresse (from Starmania) by Michel Berger & Luc Plamondon performed by Grégory Lemarchal choreo. by Galit Chait

=== With Abecassis ===
Season	Rhythm dance	Free dance
2021–2022	Rock: Robot Rock; Blues: I Feel It Coming; Funk: Stronger by Daft Punk choreo. by Galit Chait	S.O.S. d'un terrien en détresse (from Starmania) by Michel Berger & Luc Plamondon performed by Grégory Lemarchal choreo. by Galit Chait
2019–2021	Foxtrot: Sherry by The Four Seasons; Quickstep: Can't Take My Eyes Off You by Frankie Valli; Swing: choreo. by Galit Chait	Be Italian (from Nine) performed by Fergie choreo. by Galit Chait

=== With Davidovich ===
Season	Rhythm dance	Free dance
2018–2019	Chicago by John Kander; Jazz: All That Jazz; Tango: Cell Block Tango choreo. by Sergei Onik	Notre-Dame de Paris by Riccardo Cocciante choreo. by Sergei Onik
	Short dance	
2017–2018	Cha-cha: Dímelo by Marc Anthony; Samba: Ven a Bailar by Jennifer Lopez choreo. by Galit Chait Moracci	Me Voy by Yasmin Levy choreo. by Galit Chait Moracci
2016–2017	Blues: Seven Nation Army; Boogie-woogie: The Dirty Boogie choreo. by Galit Chait Moracci	Me Voy by Yasmin Levy choreo. by Galit Chait Moracci

== Competitive highlights ==
=== Ice dance with Mikhail Nosovitskiy ===
Competition placements at senior level
Season	2025–26	2026–27
World Championships	30th	
European Championships	18th	
Israeli Championships	1st	
CS Budapest Trophy		14th
CS Golden Spin of Zagreb	6th	
CS Warsaw Cup	8th	
Bolero Cup		10th
Denkova-Staviski Cup	4th	
Iceskatera		2nd
Lake Placid Ice Dance	10th	
Skate Berlin	2nd	
Skate to Milano	10th	

=== Ice dance with Dmytriy Kravchenko ===
International
Event	23–24	24–25
CS Budapest Trophy	14th	
CS Golden Spin of Zagreb		10th
CS Nebelhorn Trophy		13th
CS Warsaw Cup	11th	
Bavarian Open	10th	
Challenge Cup	12th	
Lake Placid IDI		17th
Mezzaluna Cup		6th
NRW Trophy		5th
National
Israeli Champ.	2nd	2nd

=== With Byelikov ===
International
Event	21–22
Worlds	21st
Bavarian Open	6th
Egna Trophy	4th
National
Israeli Champ.	2nd

=== With Abecassis ===
International
Event	19–20	20–21	21–22
Worlds	C	26th	
CS Nebelhorn Trophy			10th
Egna Trophy	12th		
Jégvirág Cup	1st		
Lake Placid IDI			11th
U.S. Classic			7th

=== With Davidovich ===
International
Event	2016–17	2017–18	2018–19
Worlds			25th
Europeans			20th
CS Finlandia			9th
CS Golden Spin			10th
Volvo Open Cup			12th
International: Junior
Junior Worlds	26th	17th	
JGP Austria		6th	
JGP Latvia		4th	
Bavarian Open	10th		
Golden Spin		4th	
Ice Star		2nd	
Tallinn Trophy	10th		
National
Israeli Champ.		1st J	1st
