= Juri Litvinov =

Kazakhstani figure skater

Personal information
- Born: 6 May 1978 Karaganda, Kazakh SSR, Soviet Union
- Height: 5 ft 5 in (165 cm)

Figure skating career
- Country: Kazakhstan
- Discipline: Men's singles
- Coach: Sergei Korovin
- Skating club: Sport club of Army
- Retired: 2003

Juri Litvinov (also romanized as Yuriy Litvinov, born May 6, 1978) is a Kazakh former competitive figure skater. He is a multiple national champion of Kazakhstan, and competed at the 1998 Winter Olympics, World Championships, and Four Continents Championships.

He moved to the United States of America with his then-coach, Sergei (Sergey) Korovin, in 1996. Litvinov retired from competition in 2003. He became a certified professional ice skating coach, holding certifications with the United States Figure Skating Association, USA Hockey, and the Professional Skaters Association.

He coaches figure skating and hockey at MedStar Capitals Iceplex in Arlington, Virginia and Mount Vernon Recreation Center in Alexandria, Virginia.

== Programs ==
Season	Short program	Free skating
2000–2001	Nostalgia Trails by Tino Izzo; And I Love Her by The Beatles	Concerto for Fortepiano and Orchestra by Camille Saint-Saëns

== Results ==
Results
International
Event	1993–94	1994–95	1995–96	1996–97	1997–98	1998–99	1999–00	2000–01	2001–02	2002–03
Olympics					28th					
Worlds	18th QR	14th QR	29th	20th QR		33rd	30th	37th		
Four Continents						15th	16th	16th		
GP NHK Trophy						11th				
GP Skate America						12th				
Asian Games						6th				
Finlandia								15th		
Karl Schäfer					9th					
Nebelhorn					5th					
Skate Israel						14th	2nd	5th		
Universiade								18th		
International: Junior
Junior Worlds				22nd						
National
Kazakhstan	1st	1st	1st	1st	1st	1st	1st	1st	1st	1st
GP = Grand Prix; QR = Qualifying round
