= Nurullah Sahaka =

Swiss figure skater

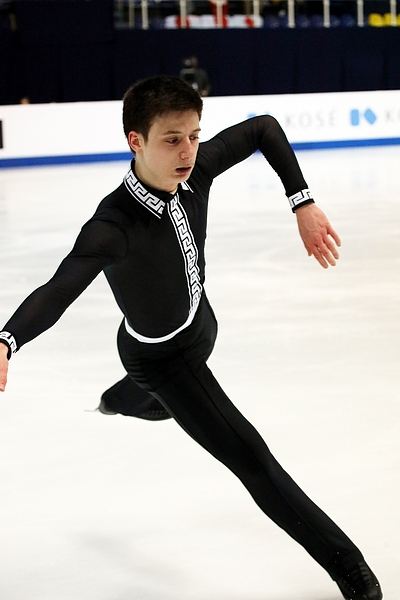
- Sahaka at the 2019 World Junior Championships

Personal information
- Born: 10 January 2000 (age 26) Munich, Germany
- Home town: Bülach, Switzerland
- Height: 1.63 m (5 ft 4 in)

Figure skating career
- Country: Switzerland
- Discipline: Men's singles
- Coach: Chafik Besseghier; Martina Pfirter
- Skating club: EC Küsnacht Zürich
- Began skating: 2009

Medal record
Swiss Championships
Gold medal – first place	2023 Chur	Singles
Silver medal – second place	2019 Wetzikon	Singles
Silver medal – second place	2020 Biel/Bienne	Singles
Bronze medal – third place	2017 Lucerne	Singles
Bronze medal – third place	2022 Lucerne	Singles

Nurullah Sahaka (born 10 January 2000) is a Swiss figure skater. He is the 2018 Dragon Trophy champion, the 2017 FBMA Trophy silver medalist, and a four-time Swiss national medalist. He competed in the final segment at the 2018 World Junior Championships.

== Career ==
=== Early years ===
Sahaka began learning to skate in 2009. In January 2013, he became the Swiss national under-16 novice champion. He won silver in the junior men's category at the Swiss Championships in January 2014 and made his junior international debut the following month. He won the Swiss junior title in January 2015.

Sahaka debuted on the ISU Junior Grand Prix series in August 2015. He made his first appearance in the senior ranks and placed fifth at the Swiss Championships in December.

=== 2016–2017 season ===
In December 2016, Sahaka won his first senior national medal, bronze, having finished third behind Stéphane Walker and Lukas Britschgi. In January 2017, he won his first senior international medal – silver at the FBMA Trophy in Abu Dhabi. In March, he competed at the 2017 World Junior Championships in Taipei, Taiwan. Ranked 34th in the short program, he did not advance to the free skate.

=== 2017–2018 season ===
Sahaka began his season on the Junior Grand Prix series. He finished fourth in the senior ranks in December at the Swiss Championships. In February 2018, he won the senior men's title at the Dragon Trophy in Slovenia. In March, he qualified to the final segment at the 2018 World Junior Championships in Sofia, Bulgaria. He ranked 13th in the short program, 18th in the free skate, and 16th overall.

=== 2018–2019 season ===
In December, Sahaka won silver in the senior men's event at the Swiss Championships, placing second behind Britschgi. In March, he competed at the 2019 World Junior Championships in Zagreb, Croatia.

=== 2019–2020 season ===
Sahaka made his debut on the Challenger series, placing twelfth at the 2019 CS Nebelhorn Trophy and thirteenth at the 2019 CS Warsaw Cup. In addition to competing at some minor internationals, he won another silver medal at the Swiss championships.

=== 2020–2021 season ===
With the COVID-19 pandemic greatly limiting international competitions, Sahaka's sole event of the year was the 2020 CS Nebelhorn Trophy, where he placed fifteenth.

=== 2021–2022 season ===
Sahaka made his debut at the 2021 CS Finlandia Trophy.

== Programs ==
Season	Short program	Free skating
2021–2022	Nemesis by Benjamin Clementine choreo. by Karine Arribert, Alisa Agafonova	Time (from Inception) by Hans Zimmer choreo. by Karine Arribert, Alisa Agafonova
2020–2021	Pierrot and the Moon by Maxime Rodriguez choreo. by Karine Arribert, Alisa Agafonova	Evolution: From Big Bang to Life in Space by Maxime Rodriguez choreo. by Cornelia Leroy, Nikolai Morozov
2019–2020	Land of All by Woodkid choreo. by Karine Arribert, Alisa Agafonova	Charlie Chaplin medley choreo. by Karine Arribert, Alisa Agafonova
2018–2019	Au Café des délices by Patrick Bruel arranged by Maxime Rodriguez choreo. by Florent Amodio	Evolution: From Big Bang to Life in Space by Maxime Rodriguez choreo. by Cornelia Leroy, Nikolai Morozov
2017–2018	Les yeux de la mama/Gitrano by Kendji Girac choreo. by Cornelia Leroy	Pierrot and the Moon by Maxime Rodriguez choreo. by Karine Arribert
2016–2017	Indigène (Tarzan) by Maxime Rodriguez choreo. by Cornelia Leroy	Pierrot and the Moon by Maxime Rodriguez choreo. by Karine Arribert
2015–2016	Indigène (Tarzan) by Maxime Rodriguez choreo. by Cornelia Leroy	L'Enfant Pur (Le Petit Prince) by Maxime Rodriguez choreo. by Cornelia Leroy

== Competitive highlights ==
- JGP – Event of the ISU Junior Grand Prix Series
- CS – Event of the ISU Challenger Series

Competition placements at senior level
Season	2015–16	2016–17	2017–18	2018–19	2019–20	2020–21	2021–22	2022–23
Swiss Championships	5th	3rd	4th	2nd	2nd		3rd	1st
CS Budapest Trophy								15th
CS Finlandia Trophy							21st	
CS Ice Challenge								14th
CS Nebelhorn Trophy					12th	15th		
CS Warsaw Cup				9th	13th			
Dragon Trophy			1st		3rd			
FBMA Trophy		2nd						
Golden Bear of Zagreb				12th				
Halloween Cup					5th			
Mentor Toruń Cup					6th			
Tirnavia Ice Cup					1st			
Trophée Métropole Nice							5th	
Volvo Open Cup							4th	
World University Games								17th

Competition placements at junior level
Season	2013–14	2014–15	2015–16	2016–17	2017–18	2018–19
World Junior Championships				34th	16th	31st
Swiss Championships	2nd	1st				
JGP Austria					16th	15th
JGP Poland					14th	
JGP Slovakia			15th			
JGP Slovenia				12th		13th
Bavarian Open					7th	1st
Challenge Cup				1st		
Coupe du Printemps	15th					
Cup of Nice			7th			
Cup of Tyrol				4th		
European Youth Olympic Festival		15th				
Golden Bear of Zagreb				2nd		
Heiko Fischer Cup	5th					
Lombardia Trophy			8th			
Tallinn Trophy		7th	10th			
