= Joseph Phan =

Canadian figure skater

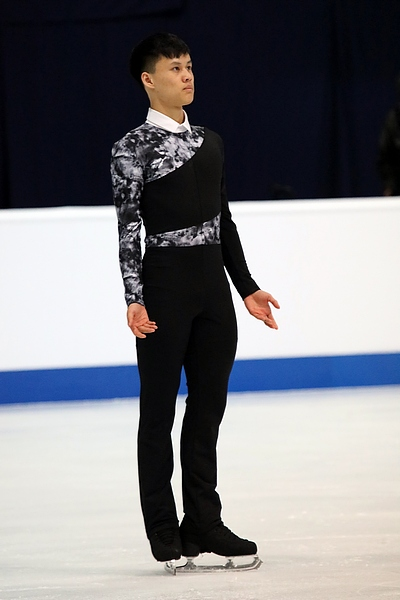
- Phan at the 2019 World Junior Championships

Personal information
- Born: August 4, 2001 (age 25) Montreal, Quebec, Canada
- Height: 1.80 m (5 ft 11 in)

Figure skating career
- Country: Canada
- Coach: Brian Orser
- Skating club: École Excellence Rosemère
- Began skating: 2006
- Retired: 2022

Joseph Phan (born August 4, 2001) is a retired Canadian figure skater. At the 2018 World Junior Championships, he won a small bronze medal for his free skate and placed fourth overall. He is the 2017 JGP Croatia Cup silver medalist, the 2018 JGP Czech Skate bronze medallist and 2016 Canadian national junior champion.

== Personal life ==
Phan was born on August 4, 2001, in Montreal, Quebec, Canada, and is ¾ Vietnamese and ¼ Chinese. He lived in Outaouais and attended École Internationale du Mont-Bleu before moving, in September 2012, to Saint-Leonard, where he attended École primaire Pie-XII. He moved to Laval, Quebec in 2013. He enrolled at École secondaire St-Gabriel.

== Career ==
=== Early years ===
Phan began learning to skate in 2006. As a young child, he trained at CPA Asticou in Gatineau, Quebec. In the 2012–2013 season, he was coached by Jocelyne Leduc, Nathalie Martin, and Sylvie Fullum in Saint-Leonard, Quebec.

The 2013–2014 season was his first as a member of École Excellence Rosemère, a club led by Yvan Desjardins in Rosemère, Quebec. After winning the national novice men's title at the 2014 Canadian Championships, Phan moved up to the junior level and placed fifth at the 2015 Canadian Championships. Later in 2015, he struggled due to a growth spurt of five inches. He became the national junior men's champion at the 2016 Canadian Championships.

=== 2016–2017 season ===
Competing in September 2016 at his first Junior Grand Prix (JGP) assignments, Phan placed sixth in Ostrava, Czech Republic, and fifth in Ljubljana, Slovenia. In December, he won the senior men's event, ahead of Bennet Toman, at the Skate Canada Challenge and qualified to compete on the same level at the 2017 Canadian National Championships in January. He finished 11th in his senior nationals debut.

=== 2017–2018 season ===
Phan began his season in August at the 2017 Junior Grand Prix in Brisbane, Australia; he placed second in the short program, seventh in the free skate, and fourth overall. In September, he won silver at his next JGP assignment, in Zagreb, Croatia, where he finished second to Alexei Krasnozhon of the United States. Competing as a senior domestically, Phan finished first, ahead of Nicolas Nadeau and Nam Nguyen, in December at the Skate Canada Challenge. The following month, he placed eighth in the short, fifth in the free, and sixth overall in the senior men's category at the 2018 Canadian Championships.

Phan placed fourteenth in the short program, third in the free skate, and fourth overall at the 2018 World Junior Championships in Sofia, Bulgaria. He was awarded a small bronze medal for his free skate.

In the off-season Phan landed his first quadruple Lutz.

=== 2018–2019 season ===
Phan received a Petro-Canada FACE grant in 2018.

In August 2018, it was confirmed that Phan had begun training under coach Brian Orser at the Toronto Cricket, Skating and Curling Club. At his first JGP assignment in Lithuania he placed fifth in the short program, but had a very poor free skate, placing ninth overall. Three weeks later in Slovenia, Phan won the bronze medal.

At the 2019 Canadian Championships, Phan placed sixth in the short program after falling on his opening quadruple toe loop attempt, though he succeeded in executing his planned combination near the end of his program on his final jump. In the free skate he was more successful, landing both of his planned quads, and placed fourth, to finish in fourth place overall, moving ahead of teammate Conrad Orzel. He was named alongside Stephen Gogolev to compete at the 2019 World Junior Championships.

Competing at Junior Worlds, Phan set a new personal best in the short program, despite putting a hand down on his triple Axel. He dropped to twelfth place after struggling in the free skate.

=== 2019–2020 season ===
Given two assignments on the Junior Grand Prix, Phan placed sixth in Latvia and fifth in Poland, before making his senior debut on the Challenger series at the 2019 CS Warsaw Cup, where he placed fifth.

Phan placed fourth at the 2020 Canadian Championships, and was assigned to compete at the 2020 World Junior Championships in Tallinn, Estonia. He placed eighth in the short program in Tallinn, his only error being a two-footed landing on his triple Axel. Phan performed poorly in the free skate and was fifteenth in that segment, dropping to twelfth place overall.

=== 2020–2021 season ===
Phan was assigned to make his Grand Prix debut at the 2020 Skate Canada International, but the event was cancelled as a result of the coronavirus pandemic.

With the pandemic continuing to make it difficult to hold in-person events, Skate Canada organized the 2021 Skate Canada Challenge as a virtual competition, and subsequently cancelled the 2021 Canadian Championships. Phan placed fourth at Challenge.

=== 2021–2022 season ===
Phan withdrew from the 2021 CS Autumn Classic International, but placed sixteenth at the 2021 CS Golden Spin of Zagreb, and seventh at the 2022 Skate Canada Challenge to qualify to the national championships. At the 2022 Canadian Championships in Ottawa, Phan finished third in both segments but fourth overall, 0.54 points behind bronze medalist Wesley Chiu. Phan pronounced himself "really happy" with his free skate despite a Lutz fall and a few underrotations, particularly having overcome nervousness about skating last in that segment. He was sent to compete at the 2022 Four Continents Championships, finishing ninth.

On June 23, Skate Canada announced his retirement from the sport.

== Programs ==
Season	Short program	Free skating
2021–2022	Money by Pink Floyd choreo. by Jeffrey Buttle	Miss Saigon by Claude-Michel Schönberg choreo. by Jeffrey Buttle
2020–2021	Money by Pink Floyd choreo. by Jeffrey Buttle	Piano Concerto No. 5 ("Emperor") by Ludwig van Beethoven choreo. by David Wilson
2019–2020	Torn (Redux) by Nathan Lanier choreo. by Jeffrey Buttle	Piano Concerto No. 5 ("Emperor") by Ludwig van Beethoven choreo. by David Wilson
2018–2019	Million Eyes by Loïc Nottet choreo. by Jeffrey Buttle	The Godfather by Nino Rota choreo. by Jeffrey Buttle
2017–2018	The Best Is Yet to Come by Michael Bublé choreo. by Jeffrey Buttle	The Godfather by Nino Rota choreo. by Jeffrey Buttle
2016–2017	The Best Is Yet to Come by Michael Bublé choreo. by Jeffrey Buttle	The Legend of 1900 by Ennio Morricone choreo. by Jeffrey Buttle
2015–2016		The Legend of 1900 by Ennio Morricone choreo. by Jeffrey Buttle

== Competitive highlights ==
CS: Challenger Series; JGP: Junior Grand Prix

International
Event	14–15	15–16	16–17	17–18	18–19	19–20	20–21	21–22
Four Continents								9th
CS Golden Spin								16th
CS Warsaw Cup						5th		
International: Junior
Junior Worlds				4th	12th	12th		
JGP Austria				4th				
JGP Croatia				2nd				
JGP Czech Republic			6th		3rd			
JGP Latvia						6th		
JGP Poland						5th		
JGP Slovenia			5th					
JGP Lithuania					9th			
Autumn Classic		2nd						
Bavarian Open			3rd			2nd		
National
Canadian Champ.	5th J	1st J	11th	6th	4th	4th	C	4th
SC Challenge	7th J	1st J	1st	1st	8th		4th	7th

== Detailed results ==
=== Senior level ===
**2021–22 season**
Date	Event	SP	FS	Total
January 6–12, 2022	2022 Canadian Championships	3; 78.14	3; 153.36	4; 231.50
December 7–11, 2021	2021 CS Golden Spin of Zagreb	24; 56.01	13; 138.64	16; 194.65
**2020–21 season**
Date	Event	SP	FS	Total
January 8–17, 2021	2021 Skate Canada Challenge	5; 79.76	4; 151.22	4; 230.98

=== Junior level ===
Small medals are awarded at ISU championships only. Personal bests highlighted in bold.

**2019–20 season**
Date	Event	Level	SP	FS	Total
March 4–8, 2020	2020 World Junior Championships	Junior	8; 77.50	15; 123.74	12; 201.24
February 3–9, 2020	2020 Bavarian Open	Junior	5; 66.33	2; 139.65	2; 206.68
January 13–19, 2020	2020 Canadian Championships	Senior	4; 82.74	4; 146.45	4; 229.19
November 14–17, 2019	2019 CS Warsaw Cup	Senior	4; 68.81	5; 129.99	5; 198.80
September 18–21, 2019	2019 JGP Poland	Junior	6; 71.88	4; 135.82	5; 207.70
September 4–7, 2019	2019 JGP Latvia	Junior	3; 74.09	8; 115.63	6; 189.72
**2018–19 season**
Date	Event	Level	SP	FS	Total
March 4–10, 2019	2019 World Junior Championships	Junior	7; **77.89**	13; 131.13	12; 209.02
January 14–20, 2019	2019 Canadian Championships	Senior	6; 76.35	5; 153.72	4; 230.07
September 26–29, 2018	2018 JGP Czech Republic	Junior	3; 73.74	2; 134.06	3; 207.80
September 5–8, 2018	2018 JGP Lithuania	Junior	5; 63.35	10; 99.48	9; 162.83
2017–18 season
Date	Event	Level	SP	FS	Total
March 5–11, 2018	2018 World Junior Championships	Junior	14; 65.26	3; **145.65**	4; 210.91
January 8–14, 2018	2018 Canadian Championships	Senior	8; 78.01	5; 163.70	6; 241.71
September 27–30, 2017	2017 JGP Croatia	Junior	2; 76.09	3; 144.98	2; **221.07**
August 23–26, 2017	2017 JGP Australia	Junior	2; 69.30	7; 114.37	4; 183.67
2016–17 season
Date	Event	Level	SP	FS	Total
February 14–19, 2017	2017 Bavarian Open	Junior	3; 60.75	2; 136.53	3; 197.28
January 16–22, 2017	2017 Canadian Championships	Senior	12; 66.51	11; 130.27	11; 196.78
September 21–25, 2016	2016 JGP Slovenia	Junior	3; 70.33	5; 127.39	5; 197.72
Aug. 31 – Sept. 4, 2016	2016 JGP Czech Republic	Junior	6; 62.38	6; 127.40	6; 189.78
2015–16 season
Date	Event	Level	SP	FS	Total
October 12–15, 2015	2015 Autumn Classic	Junior	3; 53.21	2; 114.64	2; 167.85
