= 2018 World Junior Figure Skating Championships =

- Type: ISU Championship
- Date: 5–11 March 2018
- Season: 2017–18
- Location: Sofia, Bulgaria
- Host: Bulgarian Figure Skating Championships
- Venue: Armeets Arena

Champions
- Men's singles: (Russia) Alexey Erokhov
- Ladies' singles: (Russia) Alexandra Trusova
- Pairs: (Russia) Daria Pavliuchenko / Denis Khodykin
- Ice dance: (Russia) Anastasia Skoptsova / Kirill Aleshin
- Previous: 2017 World Junior Championships
- Next: 2019 World Junior Championships

The 2018 World Junior Figure Skating Championships were held in Sofia, Bulgaria from 5–11 March 2018.

== Records ==
The following new junior records were set during this competition:

Event	Component	Skater(s)	Score	Date	Ref
Ladies	Free skating	(Russia) Alexandra Trusova	153.49	10 March 2018	
Ladies	Total score	(Russia) Alexandra Trusova	225.52	10 March 2018	

== Qualification ==
=== Minimum TES ===
The ISU stipulates that the minimum scores must be achieved at an ISU-recognized junior international competition in the ongoing or preceding season, no later than 21 days before the first official practice day.

Minimum technical scores (TES)
Discipline	SP / SD	FS / FD
Men	20	42
Ladies	20	35
Pairs	20	30
Ice dance	18	28
SP and FS scores may be attained at different events.

=== Number of entries per discipline ===
Based on the results of the 2017 Junior World Championships, each ISU member nation fielded one to three entries per discipline.

Spots	Men	Ladies	Pairs	Dance
3	United States; Russia	Russia; Japan	Australia; Russia	United States; Russia
2	South Korea; Israel; France; Japan; Ukraine; Canada	South Korea; United States; Germany; Hong Kong	China; Canada; United States; South Korea	Canada; France; Czech Republic; Germany
If not listed above, one entry is allowed.

== Schedule ==
Day	Date	Start	Finish	Discipline	Event
Day 1	March 7	12:00		Dance	Short dance
Day 1	March 7	17:30			Opening ceremony
Day 1	March 7	19:00		Pairs	Short program
Day 2	March 8	11:30		Men	Short program
Day 2	March 8	19:00		Pairs	Free skating
Day 2	March 8			Pairs	Victory ceremony
Day 3	March 9	10:45		Ladies	Short program
Day 3	March 9	19:00		Dance	Free dance
Day 3	March 9			Dance	Victory ceremony
Day 4	March 10	11:00		Men	Free skating
Day 4	March 10			Men	Victory ceremony
Day 4	March 10	16:00		Ladies	Free skating
Day 4	March 10			Ladies	Victory ceremony
Day 5	March 11	15:00			Exhibition gala

== Entries ==
Member nations began announcing their selections in December 2017. The International Skating Union published the full list of entries on 13 February 2018.

Country	Men	Ladies	Pairs	Ice dance
Australia	James Min			
Austria	Luc Maierhofer	Stefanie Pesendorfer		
Azerbaijan	Larry Loupolover	Morgan Flood		Yana Buga / Georgy Pokhilyuk
Belarus	Yakau Zenko	Aliaksandra Chepeleva		Karina Sidarenka / Maksim Yalenich
Bulgaria	Alexander Zlatkov	Alexandra Feigin		Yana Bozhilova / Kaloyan Georgiev
Canada	Conrad Orzel; Joseph Phan	Aurora Cotop	Lori-Ann Matte / Thierry Ferland; Evelyn Walsh / Trennt Michaud	Marjorie Lajoie / Zachary Lagha; Olivia McIsaac / Elliott Graham
China		Chen Hongyi	Gao Yumeng / Xie Zhong; Tang Feiyao / Yang Yongchao	Ning Wanqi / Wang Chao
Chinese Taipei	Micah Tang	Amy Lin		
Croatia	Charles Henry Katanovic	Hana Cvijanovic		
Czech Republic	Petr Kotlařík	Dahyun Ko	Edita Hornakova / Radek Jakubka	Natálie Taschlerová / Filip Taschler
Estonia	Aleksandr Selevko	Kristina Shkuleta-Gromova		Viktoria Semenjuk / Artur Gruzdev
Finland	Roman Galay	Sofia Sula		
France	Luc Economides; Adam Siao Him Fa	Léa Serna	Cléo Hamon / Denys Strekalin	Loïcia Demougeot / Théo Le Mercier; Natacha Lagouge / Corentin Rahier
Georgia	Irakli Maysuradze		Irina Gvadeneshvili / Alex Dolishniy	Maria Kazakova / Georgy Reviya
Germany	Jonathan Hess	Lea Johanna Dastich; Ann-Christin Marold	Talisa Thomalla / Robert Kunkel	Charise Matthaei / Maximilian Pfisterer; Ria Schwendinger / Valentin Wunderlich
Hong Kong	Harrison Jon-Yen Wong	Hiu Ching Kwong; Yi Christy Leung		
Hungary	Alexander Borovoj	Júlia Láng		Villő Marton / Danyil Semko
Ireland	Samuel McAllister			
Israel	David Igor Birinberg; Mark Gorodnitsky	Maya Gorodnitsky	Hailey Esther Kops / Artem Tsoglin	Shira Ichilov / Vadim Davidovich
Italy	Matteo Rizzo	Lucrezia Beccari	Sara Carli / Marco Pauletti	Chiara Calderone / Pietro Papetti
Japan	Sena Miyake; Mitsuki Sumoto	Rika Kihira; Mako Yamashita; Yuhana Yokoi	Riku Miura / Shoya Ichihashi	Haruno Yajima / Daiki Shimazaki
Kazakhstan	Nikita Manko	Alana Toktarova		Gaukhar Nauryzova / Boyisangur Datiev
Latvia	Kims Georgs Pavlovs	Anete Lāce		
Lithuania		Paulina Ramanauskaitė		
Malaysia	Chew Kai Xiang			
Mexico	Donovan Carrillo	Andrea Montesinos Cantú		
Monaco	Davide Lewton Brain			
Netherlands		Kyarha Van Tiel		
Philippines	Yamato Rowe			
Poland	Erik Matysiak	Oliwia Rzepiel		Olexandra Borysova / Cezary Zawadzki
Romania		Amanda Stan		
Russia	Artur Danielian; Alexey Erokhov; Roman Savosin	Stanislava Konstantinova; Alena Kostornaia; Alexandra Trusova	Polina Kostiukovich / Dmitrii Ialin; Anastasia Mishina / Aleksandr Galiamov; Daria Pavliuchenko / Denis Khodykin	Sofia Shevchenko / Igor Eremenko; Anastasia Skoptsova / Kirill Aleshin; Arina Ushakova / Maxim Nekrasov
South Korea	Cha Young-hyun; Lee Si-hyeong	Lim Eun-soo; You Young		
Serbia		Leona Rogic		
Singapore	Chadwick Wang	Chloe Ing		
Slovakia		Silvia Hugec		
Slovenia		Marusa Udrih		
Spain	Aleix Gabara		Isabella Gámez / Tòn Cónsul	Malene Nichita-Basquin / Jaime García
Sweden	Gabriel Folkesson	Selma Ihr		
Switzerland	Nurullah Sahaka	Maia Mazzara		
Thailand	Micah Kai Lynette			
Turkey	Başar Oktar	Guzide Irmak Bayir		
Ukraine	Ivan Pavlov; Ivan Shmuratko	Anastasiia Arkhipova	Sofiia Nesterova / Artem Darenskyi	Darya Popova / Volodymyr Byelikov
United Kingdom	Luke Digby	Kristen Spours		Sasha Fear / George Waddell
United States	Tomoki Hiwatashi; Alexei Krasnozhon; Camden Pulkinen	Ting Cui; Emmy Ma	Sarah Feng / TJ Nyman; Audrey Lu / Misha Mitrofanov	Christina Carreira / Anthony Ponomarenko; Caroline Green / Gordon Green; Chloe Lewis / Logan Bye

=== Changes to initial assignments ===
Announced	Country	Discipline	Initial	Replacement	Reference
January 12, 2018	United States	Ladies	Starr Andrews	Emmy Ma	

== Results ==
=== Men ===
The leader from the short program, Alexei Krasnozhon, sustained an injury on his first jumping pass, a quad Salchow, and subsequently withdrew from the competition.

Rank	Name	Nation	Total points	SP		FS	
1	Alexey Erokhov	Russia	231.52	2	76.54	1	154.98
2	Artur Danielian	Russia	218.76	8	69.15	2	149.61
3	Matteo Rizzo	Italy	211.58	6	70.24	6	141.34
4	Joseph Phan	Canada	210.91	14	65.26	3	145.65
5	Roman Savosin	Russia	207.91	12	65.36	5	142.55
6	Camden Pulkinen	United States	207.88	17	62.31	4	145.57
7	Tomoki Hiwatashi	United States	206.68	11	67.85	7	138.83
8	Ivan Pavlov	Ukraine	206.38	4	71.05	8	135.33
9	Mitsuki Sumoto	Japan	199.51	3	72.94	9	126.57
10	Jonathan Hess	Germany	195.32	7	69.88	10	125.44
11	Lee Si-hyeong	South Korea	194.85	5	70.70	11	124.15
12	Irakli Maysuradze	Georgia	186.98	9	68.31	15	118.67
13	Conrad Orzel	Canada	185.93	15	64.49	12	121.44
14	Mark Gorodnitsky	Israel	180.43	18	61.72	14	118.71
15	Luc Economides	France	179.55	21	58.84	13	120.71
16	Nurullah Sahaka	Switzerland	177.75	13	65.31	18	112.44
17	Adam Siao Him Fa	France	175.59	16	64.11	19	111.48
18	Sena Miyake	Japan	174.66	10	67.98	23	106.68
19	Cha Young-hyun	South Korea	174.13	23	57.57	16	116.56
20	Petr Kotlařík	Czech Republic	173.15	20	60.27	17	112.88
21	Donovan Carrillo	Mexico	168.68	19	61.37	22	107.31
22	Gabriel Folkesson	Sweden	166.39	24	57.11	20	109.28
23	Micah Kai Lynette	Thailand	166.00	22	58.38	21	107.62
WD	Alexei Krasnozhon	United States		1	80.28	—N/a	
Did not advance to free skating
25	Başar Oktar	Turkey	56.84	25	56.84	—N/a	
26	Kai Xiang Chew	Malaysia	56.76	26	56.76	—N/a	
27	Aleksandr Selevko	Estonia	54.90	27	54.90	—N/a	
28	Ivan Shmuratko	Ukraine	54.51	28	54.51	—N/a	
29	Yakau Zenko	Belarus	54.15	29	54.15	—N/a	
30	Larry Loupolover	Azerbaijan	53.67	30	53.67	—N/a	
31	Aleix Gabara	Spain	52.22	31	52.22	—N/a	
32	Davide Lewton Brain	Monaco	51.68	32	51.68	—N/a	
33	Harrison Jon-Yen Wong	Hong Kong	49.11	33	49.11	—N/a	
34	Alexander Zlatkov	Bulgaria	48.36	34	48.36	—N/a	
35	Roman Galay	Finland	47.87	35	47.87	—N/a	
36	Micah Tang	Chinese Taipei	47.37	36	47.37	—N/a	
37	Kims Georgs Pavlovs	Latvia	46.65	37	46.65	—N/a	
38	David Igor Birinberg	Israel	46.03	38	46.03	—N/a	
39	James Min	Australia	45.72	39	45.72	—N/a	
40	Alexander Borovoj	Hungary	43.43	40	43.43	—N/a	
41	Luc Maierhofer	Austria	42.52	41	42.52	—N/a	
42	Nikita Manko	Kazakhstan	41.03	42	41.03	—N/a	
43	Luke Digby	United Kingdom	40.37	43	40.37	—N/a	
44	Samuel McAllister	Ireland	39.97	44	39.97	—N/a	
45	Chadwick Wang	Singapore	39.54	45	39.54	—N/a	
46	Erik Matysiak	Poland	39.48	46	39.48	—N/a	
47	Charles Henry Katanovic	Croatia	36.80	47	36.80	—N/a	
48	Yamato Rowe	Philippines	34.37	48	34.37	—N/a	

=== Ladies ===
Alexandra Trusova set a new junior world record for the free skating (153.49 points) landing a quadruple salchow and quadruple toe. She also set the new combined total record (225.52 points).

Rank	Name	Nation	Total points	SP		FS	
1	Alexandra Trusova	Russia	225.52	1	72.03	1	153.49
2	Alena Kostornaia	Russia	207.39	2	71.63	2	135.76
3	Mako Yamashita	Japan	195.17	3	66.79	3	128.38
4	Stanislava Konstantinova	Russia	186.35	6	62.63	5	123.72
5	Lim Eun-soo	South Korea	185.12	5	62.96	6	122.16
6	Yuhana Yokoi	Japan	184.78	8	59.81	4	124.97
7	Ting Cui	United States	180.39	7	62.22	7	118.17
8	Rika Kihira	Japan	175.25	4	63.74	9	111.51
9	You Young	South Korea	171.78	9	59.79	8	111.99
10	Lea Johanna Dastich	Germany	164.34	12	55.32	10	109.02
11	Yi Christy Leung	Hong Kong	156.22	11	56.97	13	99.25
12	Stefanie Pesendorfer	Austria	153.70	13	54.16	12	99.54
13	Anastasiia Arkhipova	Ukraine	151.98	10	59.37	16	92.61
14	Selma Ihr	Sweden	150.35	14	53.33	14	97.02
15	Alexandra Feigin	Bulgaria	147.50	17	51.49	15	96.01
16	Lucrezia Beccari	Italy	147.45	23	46.46	11	100.99
17	Aurora Cotop	Canada	141.64	21	49.15	17	92.49
18	Chen Hongyi	China	141.00	18	49.83	18	91.17
19	Emmy Ma	United States	139.98	16	52.78	19	87.20
20	Ann-Christin Marold	Germany	135.56	15	52.84	20	82.72
21	Kristen Spours	United Kingdom	129.21	19	49.57	21	79.64
22	Alana Toktarova	Kazakhstan	127.27	22	48.28	22	78.99
23	Chloe Ing	Singapore	124.26	20	49.27	23	74.99
24	Kyarha van Tiel	Netherlands	116.77	24	45.88	24	70.89
Did not advance to free skating
25	Dahyun Ko	Czech Republic	45.68	25	45.68	—N/a	
26	Morgan Flood	Azerbaijan	45.04	26	45.04	—N/a	
27	Andrea Montesinos Cantu	Mexico	44.26	27	44.26	—N/a	
28	Maya Gorodnitsky	Israel	44.24	28	44.24	—N/a	
29	Sofia Sula	Finland	44.21	29	44.21	—N/a	
30	Güzide Irmak Bayır	Turkey	43.09	30	43.09	—N/a	
31	Amy Lin	Chinese Taipei	43.06	31	43.06	—N/a	
32	Júlia Láng	Hungary	42.00	32	42.00	—N/a	
33	Silvia Hugec	Slovakia	41.49	33	41.49	—N/a	
34	Kristina Škuleta-Gromova	Estonia	41.30	34	41.30	—N/a	
35	Maïa Mazzara	Switzerland	40.69	35	40.69	—N/a	
36	Hana Cvijanović	Croatia	40.51	36	40.51	—N/a	
37	Anete Lāce	Latvia	40.03	37	40.03	—N/a	
38	Léa Serna	France	39.97	38	39.97	—N/a	
39	Oliwia Rzepiel	Poland	39.71	39	39.71	—N/a	
40	Amanda Stan	Romania	38.46	40	38.46	—N/a	
41	Hiu Ching Kwong	Hong Kong	37.31	41	37.31	—N/a	
42	Aliaksandra Chepeleva	Belarus	36.63	42	36.63	—N/a	
43	Paulina Ramanauskaitė	Lithuania	33.50	43	33.50	—N/a	
44	Maruša Udrih	Slovenia	32.71	44	32.71	—N/a	

=== Pairs ===
Rank	Name	Nation	Total points	SP		FS	
1	Daria Pavliuchenko / Denis Khodykin	Russia	180.53	1	63.12	1	117.41
2	Polina Kostiukovich / Dmitrii Ialin	Russia	167.99	2	61.77	3	106.22
3	Anastasia Mishina / Aleksandr Galiamov	Russia	167.24	4	56.95	2	110.29
4	Gao Yumeng / Xie Zhong	China	164.70	3	59.55	5	105.15
5	Audrey Lu / Misha Mitrofanov	United States	160.09	6	54.38	4	105.71
6	Evelyn Walsh / Trennt Michaud	Canada	158.96	5	55.31	6	103.65
7	Talisa Thomalla / Robert Kunkel	Germany	144.38	8	52.13	8	92.25
8	Sarah Feng / TJ Nyman	United States	143.10	7	54.09	9	89.01
9	Lori-Ann Matte / Thierry Ferland	Canada	142.51	10	50.14	7	92.37
10	Riku Miura / Shoya Ichihashi	Japan	137.22	9	50.30	11	86.92
11	Cléo Hamon / Denys Strekalin	France	133.04	13	44.45	10	88.59
12	Tang Feiyao / Yang Yongchao	China	130.97	11	48.15	12	82.82
13	Isabella Gamez / Tòn Cónsul	Spain	121.00	12	45.04	14	75.96
14	Sofiia Nesterova / Artem Darenskyi	Ukraine	117.73	14	43.91	15	76.18
15	Edita Hornaková / Radek Jakubka	Czech Republic	117.55	15	41.37	13	73.82
16	Hailey Esther Kops / Artem Tsoglin	Israel	106.01	16	38.81	16	67.20
Did not advance to free skating
17	Sara Carli / Marco Pauletti	Italy	36.99	17	36.99	—N/a	

=== Ice dance ===
Rank	Name	Nation	Total points	SD		FD	
1	Anastasia Skoptsova / Kirill Aleshin	Russia	155.15	1	66.44	1	88.71
2	Christina Carreira / Anthony Ponomarenko	United States	147.68	6	60.85	2	86.83
3	Arina Ushakova / Maxim Nekrasov	Russia	146.88	3	61.29	3	85.59
4	Marjorie Lajoie / Zachary Lagha	Canada	146.22	2	62.39	5	83.83
5	Sofia Shevchenko / Igor Eremenko	Russia	145.85	4	60.95	4	84.90
6	Caroline Green / Gordon Green	United States	141.83	5	60.86	7	80.97
7	Chloe Lewis / Logan Bye	United States	139.17	8	58.07	6	81.10
8	Natacha Lagouge / Corentin Rahier	France	136.75	7	59.26	9	77.49
9	Maria Kazakova / Georgy Reviya	Georgia	133.07	11	54.95	8	78.12
10	Ria Schwendinger / Valentin Wunderlich	Germany	130.27	10	55.02	10	75.25
11	Darya Popova / Volodymyr Byelikov	Ukraine	125.26	9	55.56	11	69.70
12	Olivia McIsaac / Elliott Graham	Canada	121.17	12	52.80	14	68.37
13	Chiara Calderone / Pietro Papetti	Italy	120.85	13	51.78	13	69.07
14	Villő Marton / Danyil Semko	Hungary	119.92	15	50.58	12	69.36
15	Loïcia Demougeot / Théo Le Mercier	France	117.60	14	51.52	15	66.08
16	Yana Buga / Georgy Pokhilyuk	Azerbaijan	112.55	18	48.27	16	64.28
17	Shira Ichilov / Vadim Davidovich	Israel	112.22	17	49.63	17	62.59
18	Natálie Taschlerová / Filip Taschler	Czech Republic	110.30	16	50.25	18	60.05
19	Charise Matthaei / Maximilian Pfisterer	Germany	105.45	20	45.93	19	59.52
20	Viktoria Semenjuk / Artur Gruzdev	Estonia	105.18	19	46.09	20	59.09
Did not advance to free dance
21	Sasha Fear / George Waddell	United Kingdom	42.57	21	42.57	—N/a	
22	Ning Wanqi / Wang Chao	China	41.40	22	41.40	—N/a	
23	Haruno Yajima / Daiki Shimazaki	Japan	41.16	23	41.16	—N/a	
24	Karina Sidarenka / Maksim Yalenich	Belarus	40.00	24	40.00	—N/a	
25	Yana Bozhilova / Kaloyan Georgiev	Bulgaria	38.81	25	38.81	—N/a	
26	Olexandra Borysova / Cezary Zawadzki	Poland	38.67	26	38.67	—N/a	
27	Gaukhar Nauryzova / Boyisangur Datiev	Kazakhstan	38.33	27	38.33	—N/a	
28	Malene Niquita-Basquin / Jaime García	Spain	36.26	28	36.26	—N/a	

== Medals summary ==
=== Medalists ===
Medals for overall placement:

Discipline	Gold	Silver	Bronze
Men	(Russia) Alexey Erokhov	(Russia) Artur Danielian	(Italy) Matteo Rizzo
Ladies	(Russia) Alexandra Trusova	(Russia) Alena Kostornaia	(Japan) Mako Yamashita
Pairs	(Russia) Daria Pavliuchenko / Denis Khodykin	(Russia) Polina Kostiukovich / Dmitrii Ialin	(Russia) Anastasia Mishina / Aleksandr Galiamov
Ice dancing	(Russia) Anastasia Skoptsova / Kirill Aleshin	(United States) Christina Carreira / Anthony Ponomarenko	(Russia) Arina Ushakova / Maxim Nekrasov

Small medals for placement in the short segment:

Discipline	Gold	Silver	Bronze
Men	(United States) Alexei Krasnozhon	(Russia) Alexey Erokhov	(Japan) Mitsuki Sumoto
Ladies	(Russia) Alexandra Trusova	(Russia) Alena Kostornaia	(Japan) Mako Yamashita
Pairs	(Russia) Daria Pavliuchenko / Denis Khodykin	(Russia) Polina Kostiukovich / Dmitrii Ialin	(China) Gao Yumeng / Xie Zhong
Ice dance	(Russia) Anastasia Skoptsova / Kirill Aleshin	(Canada) Marjorie Lajoie / Zachary Lagha	(Russia) Arina Ushakova / Maxim Nekrasov

Small medals for placement in the free segment:

Discipline	Gold	Silver	Bronze
Men	(Russia) Alexey Erokhov	(Russia) Artur Danielian	(Canada) Joseph Phan
Ladies	(Russia) Alexandra Trusova	(Russia) Alena Kostornaia	(Japan) Mako Yamashita
Pairs	(Russia) Daria Pavliuchenko / Denis Khodykin	(Russia) Anastasia Mishina / Aleksandr Galiamov	(Russia) Polina Kostiukovich / Dmitrii Ialin
Ice dance	(Russia) Anastasia Skoptsova / Kirill Aleshin	(United States) Christina Carreira / Anthony Ponomarenko	(Russia) Arina Ushakova / Maxim Nekrasov

=== By country ===
Table of medals for overall placement:

Rank	Nation	Gold	Silver	Bronze	Total
1	Russia (RUS)	4	3	2	9
2	United States (USA)	0	1	0	1
3	Italy (ITA)	0	0	1	1
3	Japan (JPN)	0	0	1	1
Totals (4 entries)		4	4	4	12
