= Vadim Davidovich =

Israeli ice dancer (born 1996)

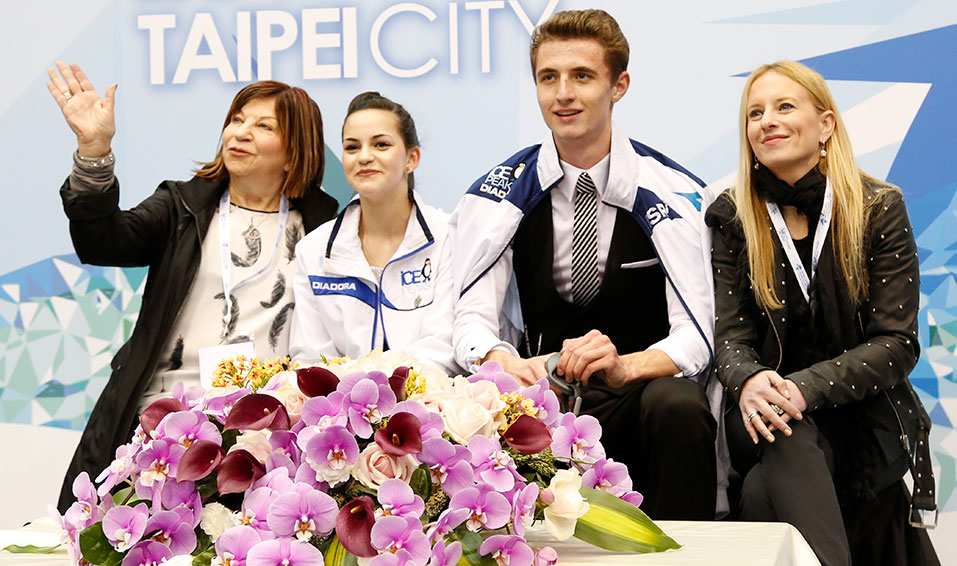

Personal information
- Native name: דוידוביץ' (Hebrew); Вадзім Давідовіч (Belarusian)
- Other names: Vadzim Davidovich
- Born: 19 September 1996 (age 29) Minsk, Belarus
- Home town: Minsk, Belarus
- Height: 1.80 m (5 ft 11 in)

Figure skating career
- Country: Israel
- Partner: Shira Ichilov
- Coach: Galit Chait Moracci; Alexei Gorshkov
- Skating club: Ice Peaks
- Began skating: 2003

Vadim Davidovich (Hebrew: 'ואדים דוידוביץ; born 19 September 1996) is an Israeli ice dancer. With his skating partner, Shira Ichilov, he is the 2019 Israeli national champion and has competed in the final segment at two ISU Championships.

== Career ==
=== Early years ===
Davidovich started learning to skate in 2003. Early in his career, he represented Belarus with Hanna Karastsialiova (Karastseleva) and with Russia's Anastasia Tkacheva. Tkacheva/Davidovich appeared at one ISU Junior Grand Prix event, in 2015. The two were coached by Alexander Zhulin and Oleg Volkov in Moscow, Russia.

=== 2016–2017 season ===
In July 2016, Davidovich teamed up with Shira Ichilov to compete for Israel, coached by Galit Chait in the United States. In November, making their international debut, Ichilov/Davidovich finished tenth in junior ice dancing at the 2016 Tallinn Trophy. In March, they placed 26th in the short dance at the 2017 World Junior Championships in Taipei, Taiwan. Their placement was not sufficient to advance to the free dance.

=== 2017–2018 season ===
In September, Ichilov/Davidovich debuted on the ISU Junior Grand Prix series, finishing sixth in Salzburg, Austria, and then fourth in Riga, Latvia. After taking silver in the junior event at the 2017 Minsk-Arena Ice Star and placing fourth at the 2017 Golden Spin of Zagreb, they became the Israeli national junior champions. In March, the duo competed at the 2018 World Junior Championships in Sofia, Bulgaria; they qualified to the final segment and finished 17th overall. It was Davidovich's final season of age-eligibility for junior events.

=== 2018–2019 season ===
Making their senior international debut, Ichilov/Davidovich finished ninth at the 2018 CS Finlandia Trophy in October. They placed 12th at the Volvo Open Cup and 10th at the 2018 CS Golden Spin of Zagreb before taking the Israeli national title.

In January, the two qualified to the free dance at the 2019 European Championships in Minsk, Belarus. They finished 20th overall, having ranked 20th in both segments.

== Programs ==
=== With Ichilov ===
Season	Rhythm dance	Free dance
2019–2010	Foxtrot: Sherry by The Four Seasons; Quickstep: Can't Take My Eyes Off You by Frankie Valli; Swing:	Be Italian (from Nine) performed by Fergie
2018–2019	Chicago by John Kander; Jazz: All That Jazz; Tango: Cell Block Tango choreo. by Sergei Onik	Notre-Dame de Paris by Riccardo Cocciante choreo. by Sergei Onik
	Short dance	
2017–2018	Cha-cha: Dímelo by Marc Anthony; Samba: Ven a Bailar by Jennifer Lopez choreo. by Galit Chait Moracci	Me Voy by Yasmin Levy choreo. by Galit Chait Moracci
2016–2017	Blues: Seven Nation Army; Boogie-woogie: The Dirty Boogie choreo. by Galit Chait Moracci	Me Voy by Yasmin Levy choreo. by Galit Chait Moracci

=== With Tkacheva ===
Season	Short dance	Free dance
2015–2016	Foxtrot: Petite Fleur by Sidney Bechet performed by Henri Salvador; Waltz: Padam, padam... by Édith Piaf choreo. by Sergei Petukhov	Bismisah; Ask Derun; Muhteşem Yüzyıl: Opening Theme choreo. by Sergei Petukhov
2014–2015	Cuban Pete; Perhaps, Perhaps, Perhaps performed by Doris Day	Bismisah; Ask Derun; Muhteşem Yüzyıl: Opening Theme choreo. by Sergei Petukhov

=== With Karastsialiova ===
Season	Short dance	Free dance
2012–2013	Swing Baby; You Can Leave Your Hat On performed by Joe Cocker	

== Competitive highlights ==
GP: Grand Prix; CS: Challenger Series; JGP: Junior Grand Prix

=== With Ichilov for Israel ===
International
Event	2016–17	2017–18	2018–19
Worlds			25th
Europeans			20th
CS Finlandia			9th
CS Golden Spin			10th
Volvo Open Cup			12th
International: Junior
Junior Worlds	26th	17th	
JGP Austria		6th	
JGP Latvia		4th	
Bavarian Open	10th		
Golden Spin		4th	
Ice Star		2nd	
Tallinn Trophy	10th		
National
Israeli Champ.		1st J	1st
J = Junior level

=== With Tkacheva for Belarus ===
International: Junior
Event	2014–15	2015–16
JGP Slovakia		11th
Bavarian Open	5th	
Ice Star	12th	6th
Leo Scheu Memorial	5th	
NRW Trophy		10th
Toruń Cup	7th	

=== With Karastsialiova for Belarus ===
International: Junior
Event	2012–13
Ice Star	6th
NRW Trophy	30th
Santa Claus Cup	23rd
