= Temirlan Yerzhanov =

Kazakhstani-American ice dancer (born 1996)

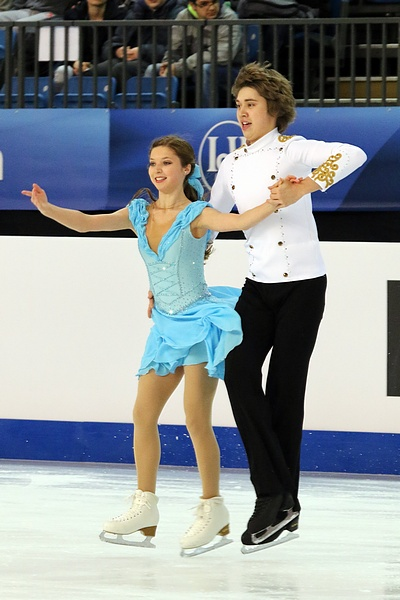

Personal information
- Native name: Темирлан Мухтарұлы Ержанов
- Full name: Temirlan Mukhtarovich Yerzhanov
- Born: May 28, 1996 (age 30) Almaty, Kazakhstan
- Home town: West Palm Beach, Florida
- Height: 1.80 m (5 ft 11 in)

Figure skating career
- Country: Kazakhstan
- Partner: Maxine Weatherby
- Coach: Evgeni Platov; John Kerr
- Skating club: Palm Beach Ice Works
- Began skating: 2004
- Retired: 2022

Temirlan "Tima" Mukhtarovich Yerzhanov (Kazakh: Темирлан Мухтарұлы Ержанов; born May 28, 1996) is a retired Kazakhstani ice dancer. With his skating partner, Maxine Weatherby, he is the 2020 Kazakhstani national champion and the 2019 Denis Ten Memorial Challenge bronze medalist. They competed in the final segment at the 2020 Four Continents Championships.

== Personal life ==
Yerzhanov was born on May 28, 1996, in Almaty, Kazakhstan. He has a sister. When Yerzhanov was 15 years old, he moved to the United States to train. He works at a skating coach at Palm Beach Ice Works in West Palm Beach, where he also trains.

Yerzhanov enjoys cooking and wants to enter the restaurant business after retiring from skating. He also enjoys reading history books, particularly about Genghis Khan. Yerzhanov plays ice hockey recreationally and was invited to join an amateur league in Florida, but declined due to injury concerns.

== Career ==
=== Early career ===
Yerzhanov began skating in 2004. As a men's singles skater, he was the 2012 Kazakhstani junior national champion. Yerzhanov began competing in ice dance during the 2014–15 season. Representing Kazakhstan with American Rebecca Dawn Lucas, they competed in one Junior Grand Prix event. Yerzhanov switched partners in 2015–16 and competed with Hannah Grace Cook of the United States for two seasons representing Kazakhstan. Cook/Yerzhanov were the 2016 Kazakhstani national bronze medalists and competed at two World Junior Championships (2016, 2017), placing 27th and 22nd, respectively. During the 2017–18 season, Yerzhanov struggled to find a partner and considered retiring.

Yerzhanov teamed up with Maxine Weatherby, also American, to continue representing his native country in July 2018. They had previously known each other while training in Coral Springs, Florida, and tried out on the suggestion of Weatherby's mother. Weatherby/Yerzhanov train under Evgeni Platov in West Palm Beach and John Kerr in Pembroke Pines.

During their first season together in 2018–19, Weatherby/Yerzhanov won the silver medal at the 2019 Kazakhstani Championships behind Gaukhar Nauryzova / Boyisangur Datiev and finished eighth at the Bavarian Open.

=== 2019–2020 season ===
Weatherby/Yerzhanov opened their season at the Lake Placid Ice Dance International, where they placed 12th. They then finished eighth at the 2019 CS U.S. Classic. At the Denis Ten Memorial Challenge in October, Weatherby/Yerzhanov won their first international medal, bronze behind Germans Katharina Müller / Tim Dieck and Adelina Galyavieva / Louis Thauron of France. They also earned the technical minimums to compete at the 2020 Four Continents Championships and 2020 World Championships. After the event, Yerzhanov said he had always "dreamed of skating in Kazakhstan" and competing in front of his family. Weatherby/Yerzhanov won the national title at the 2020 Kazakhstani Championships.

At Four Continents, Weatherby/Yerzhanov were 16th in the rhythm dance and 15th in the free dance to finish 16th overall. The World Championships were cancelled due to the COVID-19 pandemic. During the ensuing lockdown, Weatherby/Yerzhanov trained separately for a time due to rinks being closed in Florida, before eventually meeting up to practice lifts off-ice. To earn income, Yerzhanov worked as a personal trainer for a Russian family before it was deemed too high risk and went grocery shopping for the elderly.

=== 2020–2021 season ===
There were limited competition opportunities due to the pandemic. Weatherby/Yerzhanov plan to compete at the 2021 World Championships if they are not cancelled, but were missing from the initial entry list.

== Programs ==
=== With Weatherby ===
| Season | Rhythm dance | Free dance |
|---|---|---|
| 2020–2021 | | |
| 2019–2020 | Quickstep: Hot Honey Rag (from Chicago) by John Kander; Blues: Bei Mir Bistu Shein by Jacob Jacobs, Sholom Secunda performed by Swing Kids; Quickstep: Bei Mir Bistu Shein choreo. by Zhanna Palagina | Halo by Beyoncé performed by Madilyn Bailey; Torn by Nathan Lanier choreo. by John Kerr |
| 2018–2019 | | |

=== With Cook ===
| Season | Short dance | Free dance |
|---|---|---|
| 2016–2017 | Blues: Your Heart Is As Black As Night by Melody Gardot; Swing: Bad Boy Good Man by Take Five choreo. by Philip Askew | Un Giorno Per Noi by Henry Mancini performed by Josh Groban choreo. by Zhanna Palagina, Evgeni Platov |
| 2015–2016 | Waltz; Polka; March choreo. by John Kerr, Sinead Kerr | Love Actually by Craig Armstrong choreo. by John Kerr, Sinead Kerr |

=== With Lucas ===
| Season | Short dance | Free dance |
|---|---|---|
| 2014–2015 | Samba: La Vida Es Un Carnaval by Victor Daniel; Cha Cha: El Ratón by Cheo Feliciano, Joe Cuba; Samba: Ai Se Eu Te Pego by Sharon Acioly, Antônio Dyggs choreo. by John Kerr, Sinead Kerr | Dance at the Gym; Overture; America (from West Side Story) by Leonard Bernstein choreo. by John Kerr, Sinead Kerr |

== Competitive highlights ==
CS: Challenger Series; JGP: Junior Grand Prix

=== Ice dance with Weatherby ===
International
| Event | 18–19 | 19–20 | 20–21 | 21-22 |
|---|---|---|---|---|
| Worlds | | C | WD | |
| Four Continents | | 16th | C | |
| CS U.S. Classic | | 8th | | |
| Bavarian Open | 8th | | | |
| Denis Ten MC | | 3rd | | WD |
| Lake Placid IDI | | 12th | | |
National
| Kazakhstani Champ. | 2nd | 1st | | |
TBD = Assigned; WD = Withdrew; C = Cancelled

=== Ice dance with Cook ===
International: Junior
| Event | 2015–16 | 2016–17 |
|---|---|---|
| Junior Worlds | 27th | 22nd |
| JGP Austria | 15th | |
| Lake Placid IDI | 10th | |
| Santa Claus Cup | | 6th |
National
| Kazakhstani Champ. | 3rd | |

=== Ice dance with Lucas ===
International: Junior
| Event | 2014–15 |
|---|---|
| JGP Czech Republic | 8th |

=== Men's singles ===
International: Junior
| Event | 2011–12 |
|---|---|
| Santa Claus Cup | 6th |
National
| Kazakhstani Champ. | 1st J |
Levels: J = Junior

== Detailed results ==
ISU Personal Bests highlighted in bold.

With Weatherby

2020–21 season
| Date | Event | RD | FD | Total |
2019–20 season
| Date | Event | RD | FD | Total |
|---|---|---|---|---|
| February 4–9, 2020 | 2020 Four Continents Championships | 16; **50.33** | 15; **81.94** | 16; **132.27** |
| October 9–12, 2019 | 2019 Denis Ten Memorial Challenge | 3; 60.49 | 3; 95.68 | 3; 156.17 |
| September 17–22, 2019 | 2019 CS U.S. International Classic | 9; 46.93 | 8; 78.32 | 8; 125.25 |
| Jul. 30 – Aug. 2, 2019 | 2019 Lake Placid Ice Dance International | 13; 42.00 | 12; 65.03 | 12; 107.03 |
2018–19 season
| Date | Event | RD | FD | Total |
| February 5–10, 2019 | 2019 Bavarian Open | 10; 50.64 | 8; 78.45 | 8; 129.09 |
