= Zahra Lari =

Emirati figure skater

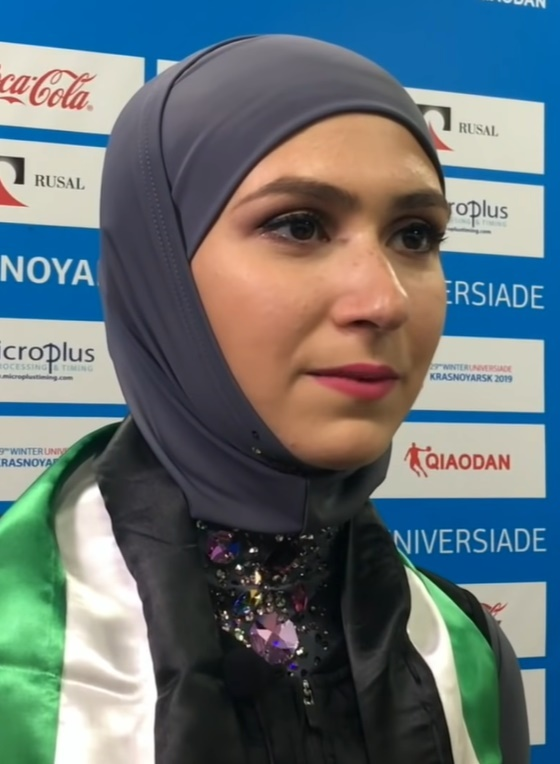

Personal information
- Native name: زهرة لاري
- Born: March 3, 1995 (age 31) Abu Dhabi
- Home town: Abu Dhabi

Figure skating career
- Country: United Arab Emirates
- Coach: Bohdan Berezenko
- Began skating: 2007

Zahra Lari (born March 3, 1995) is an Emirati figure skater. She is the first figure skater from the United Arab Emirates and the Middle East to compete internationally. Lari is a five-time Emirati National Champion.

In addition to her rigorous training, Zahra graduated from Abu Dhabi University majoring in Environmental Health and Safety. She is the Co-Founder and CEO of Emirates Skating Club, which is the first established figure skating club in the country. She is a dedicated activist for the health and well-being of the UAE society and women in general. Zahra is registered and certified in the UAE National Records for her achievements in serving the Society and the State.

== Personal life ==
Zahra Lari is from Abu Dhabi, UAE where she resides with her parents and two brothers. Her father is from the United Arab Emirates. Zahra was inspired to try figure skating at the age of 12, after watching the Disney film Ice Princess, and was able to begin skating lessons shortly after. She graduated from Abu Dhabi University, where she studied environmental health and safety, though she holds the title of CEO and Co-founder of Emirates Skating Club in Abu Dhabi. In 2017, she was included in a Nike, Inc. ad featuring Muslim women athletes.

Lari is also the first figure skater to compete internationally in a hijab. She hopes to serve as an inspiration and light to other young women.

Lari got married in 2020. She has one daughter.

== Programs ==
| Season | Short program | Free skating |
|---|---|---|
| 2019–20 | | Zahra by Ihab Darwish |
| 2018–19 | | |
| 2016–18 | Pierrot and the Moon by Maxime Rodriguez | Weeping Meadow (soundtrack) by Eleni Karaindrou |

== Career ==
=== Early career ===
Zahra Lari began learning to skate at the age of 12 at Zayed Sports City. Although her mother was initially supportive, it took some time before her father would let her compete, preferring she continued skating as a hobby. However, after he saw how passionate she was about the sport, he relented.

=== 2011–12 season ===
Her junior international debut was in the 2011-12 season at the European Cup in Canazei, Italy. She received a deduction due to her headscarf, as it was not an approved part of the costume. However, after taking up the issue with the ISU, they changed the rule, allowing for headscarves to be worn in competition.

=== 2013–14 season ===
Lari competed at three international junior competitions. She placed 7th at the Dubai Golden Cup, 12th at the New Year's Cup, and 26th at the [Sportland Trophy.

=== 2014–15 season ===
Lari began competing at the senior level and placed 4th at the FBMA Trophy – her best international placement to date. She also competed at the 2015 International Challenge Cup and placed 11th.

=== 2015-16 season ===
Due to an injury, Zahra only competed at the FBMA Trophy that was held at her home rink.

=== 2016-17 season ===
Zahra competed at the Asian Winter Games in Japan, Cup of Tyrol, EGNA Spring Trophy, FBMA Trophy in Abu Dhabi at her home rink, Skate Helena and Merano Cup.

=== 2017–18 season ===
Zahra competed in the Nebelhorn Trophy (Olympic Qualifiers), Bavarian Open, Cup of Tyrol, FBMA trophy (held at her home rink), Golden Bear, Slovenia Open and UAE National Championship.

=== 2018–19 season ===
Lari competed at the 2019 Winter Universiade in Krasnoyarsk, Russia and is the first Emirati to compete in the Winter Universiade.

=== Post-Competitive ===
Due to rink closures during the COVID-19 pandemic Lari took a step back from what she realized was a "unsustainable, frenzied cycle of training and traveling." She is the CEO of the Emirates Skating Club and president of the Figure Skating Committee under the UAE Winter Sports Federation.

In February 2024, Lari published an autobiographical children's book, Not Yet, with co-author Hadley Davis, the screenwriter of Ice Princess, and illustrated by Sara Alfageeh.

== Competitive highlights ==
CS: Challenger Series

International
| Event | 13–14 | 14–15 | 15–16 | 16–17 | 17–18 | 18-19 | 19-20 |
|---|---|---|---|---|---|---|---|
| CS Alpen Trophy | | | | | | 28th | |
| CS Lombardia | | | | | | WD | |
| CS Nebelhorn | | | | | 33rd | | |
| CS Tallinn Trophy | | | | | | 28th | |
| Asian Games | | | | 18th | | | |
| Bavarian Open | | | | | 15th | | |
| Cup of Tyrol | | | | 25th | 19th | | |
| EduSport Trophy | | | | | | 8th | |
| Egna Spring Trophy | | | | 12th | | | |
| FBMA Trophy | | 4th | 5th | 15th | 10th | | |
| Golden Bear | | | | | 13th | | |
| Halloween Cup | | | | | | 16th | |
| Int. Challenge Cup | | 11th | | | | | |
| Skate Helena | | | | 14th | | | |
| Merano Cup | | | | 16th | | | |
| Slovenia Open | | | | | 23rd | | |
| Winter Universiade | | | | | | 29th | |
International: Junior
| Dubai Golden Cup | 7th | | | | | | |
| New Year's Cup | 12th | | | | | | |
| Sportland Trophy | 26th | | | | | | |
National
| Emirati Champ. | | | 1st | | 1st | | |
J = Junior level

== Detailed results ==
=== Senior career ===
2017–18 season
| Date | Event | Level | SP | FS | Total |
|---|---|---|---|---|---|
| January 5–7, 2017 | FBMA Trophy 2017 | Senior | 15; 24.17 | 15; 50.59 | 15; 74.76 |
2016–17 season
| Date | Event | Level | SP | FS | Total |
| April 6–9, 2017 | Egna Spring Trophy | Senior | 12; 25.81 | 12; 51.86 | 12; 77.67 |
| February 28 - March 5, 2017 | Cup of Tyrol 2017 | Senior | 24; 25.90 | 26; 54.19 | 25; 80.09 |
| February 19–26, 2017 | 2017 Asian Winter Games | Senior | 19; 23.31 | 17; 53.37 | 18; 76.68 |
| January 17–21, 2017 | 10th Europa Cup Skate Helena | Senior | 15; 21.87 | 13; 50.69 | 14; 72.56 |
| January 5–7, 2017 | FBMA Trophy 2017 | Senior | 17; 24.17 | 16; 50.59 | 16; 74.76 |
| November 10–13, 2016 | 19th ISU Merano Cup 2016 | Senior | 17; 19.95 | 16; 45.67 | 16; 65.62 |
2015–16 season
| Date | Event | Level | SP | FS | Total |
| January 22–23, 2016 | FBMA Trophy 2016 | Senior | 5; 20.50 | 5; 41.37 | 5; 61.87 |
2014–15 season
| Date | Event | Level | SP | FS | Total |
| April 3–5, 2015 | FBMA Trophy 2015 | Senior | 4; 25.81 | 4; 46.66 | 4; 72.47 |
| February 19–22, 2015 | International Challenge Cup 2015 | Senior | 12; 19.65 | 11; 39.51 | 11; 59.16 |

=== Junior career ===
2013–14 season
| Date | Event | Level | SP | FS | Total |
|---|---|---|---|---|---|
| May 5-June 5, 2014 | Dubai Golden Cup 2014 | Junior | 4; 25.70 | 7; 39.70 | 7; 65.40 |
2011–12 season
| April 9–13, 2012 | 2012 European Cup | Junior | | | 15 |

== See also ==
- Muslim women in sport
- Hijabis
