= Akbulak, Kazakhstan =

Akbulak
- Suburb of Almaty
- Location in Kazakhstan
- Coordinates: 43°14′44″N 76°49′40″E
- Country: Kazakhstan
- Region: Almaty Region
- Time zone: UTC+6 (Omsk Time)

Akbulak (Kazakh: Ақбұлақ, Aqbūlaq) or Akbulak Micro District is a western suburb of Almaty in Almaty Region of south-eastern Kazakhstan. Akbulak lies off the M33 highway and has a notable New Russian Orthodox church.

== History ==
Akbulak is part of a residential area of south-western Almaty which are known as "Microdistricts". They constitute formal areas of the city and developed between the 1960s and 1980s during the Soviet era as residential areas, as the city grew into the largest in Kazakhstan, being the capital of the country at the time before it was moved to Astana.

== Economy ==
According to the government of Auezov district, the length of the street in Akbulak microdistrict totals 32 kilometers. In recent years there has been considerable improvement in infrastructure in Akbulak; 3 kilometers of Sharipov Street were asphalted in 2007 and were 11 streets asphalted in 2008. The length of systems of water supply is 11.7 kilometers, with some 2.7 kilometers of pipes updated in 2007. Akbulak is also supplied with resources of natural gas.
