= Union Figure Skating Trophy =

International figure skating competition

- Location: United Arab Emirates

The Union Figure Skating Trophy (formerly the Abu Dhabi Classic Trophy (2023-24) and FBMA Trophy (2015-17)) is an annual international figure skating competition which is generally held in January in Abu Dhabi in the United Arab Emirates. It is the only figure skating competition in the Arab world included on the International Skating Union's calendar. Medals may be awarded in men's singles and women's singles at the senior, junior, and novice levels.

== Senior results ==
=== Men's singles ===
Year	Gold	Silver	Bronze	Ref.
2016	(Sweden) Ondrej Spiegl	(Chinese Taipei) Tsao Chih-I	No other competitors	
2017	(France) Chafik Besseghier	(Switzerland) Nurullah Sahaka	(Hong Kong) Harry Hau Yin Lee	
2023	(Armenia) Semen Daniliants	No other competitors		
2024	(Estonia) Aleksandr Selevko	(Armenia) Semen Daniliants	(Hong Kong) Naoki Ma	
2025	(Finland) Valtter Virtanen	(Kazakhstan) Oleg Melnikov	No other competitors	

=== Women's singles ===
Year	Gold	Silver	Bronze	Ref.
2015	(Ukraine) Anastasia Kononenko	(Greece) Isabella Schuster-Velissariou	(Republic of Ireland) Clara Peters	
2016	(South Korea) Youn Ha-rim	(Germany) Nicole Schott	(Thailand) Thita Lamsam	
2017	(Finland) Emmi Peltonen	(Austria) Kerstin Frank	(Slovenia) Daša Grm	
2023	(Austria) Stefanie Pesendorfer	(Austria) Jasmin Elsebaie	(Serbia) Antonina Dubinina	
2024	(Estonia) Nataly Langerbaur	(Kazakhstan) Sofia Farafonova	(Kazakhstan) Anna Levkovets	
2025	(Czech Republic) Michaela Vrašťáková	(Turkey) Salma Agamova	(Kazakhstan) Anna Levkovets	

== Junior results ==
=== Men's singles ===
Year	Gold	Silver	Bronze	Ref.
2016	(Sweden) John Olof Hallman	(Australia) Charlton Doherty	(Australia) Darian Kaptich	
2017	(France) Yann Frechon	(France) Lotfi Sereir	(South Africa) Matthew Samuels	
2023	(Israel) Nikita Sheiko	(Israel) Segev Shlomo Avisar	(Armenia) Mikayel Salazaryan	
2024	No junior men's competitors			
2025	(Armenia) Konstantin Smirnov	No other competitors		

=== Women's singles ===
Year	Gold	Silver	Bronze	Ref.
2015	(Republic of Ireland) Ciara Hoey	No other competitors		
2016	(Sweden) Anita Östlund	(Australia) Katie Pasfield	(Germany) Paula Mikolajczyk	
2017	(France) Nadjma Mahamoud	(Hong Kong) Hiu Ching Kwong	(Switzerland) Camille Chervet	
2023	(Cyprus) Stefania Yakovleva	(Austria) Hannah Frank	(Israel) Elizabet Gervits	
2024	(Georgia (country)) Aisha Allakhverdieva	(Kazakhstan) Zere Sarbalina	(Estonia) Marianne Must	
2025	(Cyprus) Stefania Yakovleva	(Finland) Darja Trubitson	(Kazakhstan) Zere Sarbalina	

== Figure Skating Championships of the United Arab Emirates ==
Figure Skating Championships of the United Arab Emirates
- Status: Active
- Genre: National championships
- Frequency: Annual
- Country: United Arab Emirates

=== Senior medalists ===
==== Women's singles ====
Year	Gold	Silver	Bronze	Ref.
2017	Zahra Lari	No other competitors		
2024-25	No women's competitors			

=== Junior medalists ===
==== Women's singles ====
Year	Gold	Silver	Bronze	Ref.
2024	Elisa Maria Westerhof	No other competitors		
2025	No junior women's competitors			
