= Denis Ten Memorial Challenge =

International figure skating competition

- Status: Active
- Genre: ISU Challenger Series
- Frequency: Annual
- Country: Kazakhstan
- Inaugurated: 2019
- Previous event: 2026 Denis Ten Memorial Challenge
- Organizer: Denis Ten Foundation & Kazakhstan Skating Union

The Denis Ten Memorial Challenge is an annual figure skating competition sanctioned by the International Skating Union (ISU), organized and hosted by the Denis Ten Foundation and the Kazakhstan Skating Union. The competition debuted in 2019 and is named in honor of Denis Ten, a former Kazakh figure skater who won the bronze medal at the 2014 Winter Olympics. The Denis Ten Memorial Challenge has been a Challenger Series event every year since 2021. Medals may be awarded in men's singles, women's singles, pair skating, and ice dance; and as part of the Challenger Series, skaters earn points towards the World Standings and Season's World Ranking based on their results.

== History ==
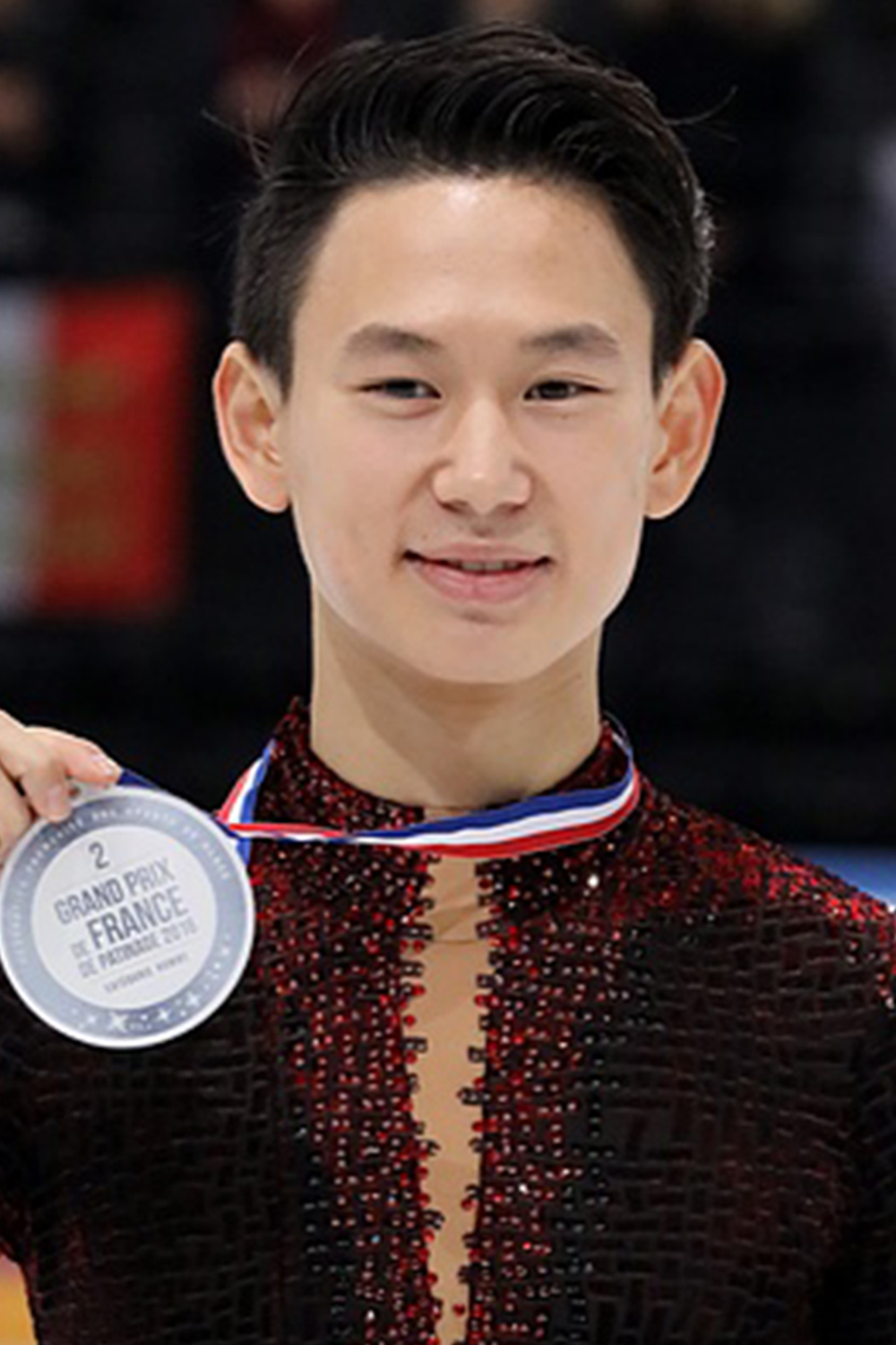
Denis Ten with his silver medal at the 2016 Trophée de France

The Denis Ten Memorial Challenge is named in honor of Denis Ten, a former figure skater who competed internationally for Kazakhstan. He was the 2014 Winter Olympic bronze medalist, two-time World Championship medalist (silver in 2013; bronze in 2015), and the 2015 Four Continents champion. He was a member of the Astana Presidential Club, an organization that supported and developed high-achievement sports in Kazakhstan. Prior to Ten's success, Kazakhstan had almost no presence in international figure skating. After his bronze medal finish at the 2014 Winter Olympics, he became a national icon, responsible for a surge in popularity of figure skating in Kazakhstan. He was also part of Kazakhstan's bid to host the 2022 Winter Olympics. Ten was murdered on 19 July 2018 in Almaty by two carjackers who were attempting to steal his mirrors. His death prompted widespread condolences from the international sports community. Thomas Bach, president of the International Olympic Committee, described Ten as "a great athlete and a great ambassador for his sport... Such a tragedy to lose him at such a young age." Arystanbek Muhamediuly, Kazakh Minister of Culture and Sport, said: "Denis Ten was an incredible figure skater, the legend of our sport, our pride."

One of Denis’s main goals was to develop figure skating in Kazakhstan and represent the country on the world sports arena. Therefore, we are very proud that our country has the honour of organising a tournament of this scale for the first time... We are very happy to give unforgettable emotions to all lovers of figure skating.

— Oksana Ten, mother of Denis Ten and founder of the Denis Ten Foundation

Organized by the Denis Ten Foundation, the inaugural edition of the Denis Ten Memorial Challenge was held in 2019 at the Halyk Arena in Almaty. Ten's mother Oksana explained that one of Ten's goals was to develop figure skating in Kazakhstan. Morisi Kvitelashvili of Georgia won the inaugural men's event, Serafima Sakhanovich of Russia won the women's event, Lina Kudriavtseva and Ilia Spiridonov of Russia won the pairs event, and Katharina Müller and Tim Dieck of Germany won the ice dance event. The competition was cancelled in 2020 due to the COVID-19 pandemic.

In 2021, the Denis Ten Memorial Challenge was the seventh event of the ISU Challenger Series, a series of international figure skating competitions sanctioned by the International Skating Union (ISU) and organized by ISU member nations. The objective is to ensure consistent organization and structure within a series of international competitions linked together, providing opportunities for senior-level skaters to compete at the international level and also earn points towards the World Standings and Season's World Ranking. When an event is held as part of the Challenger Series, it must host at least three of the four disciplines (men's singles, women's singles, pair skating, and ice dance) and representatives from at least ten different ISU member nations. The minimum number of entrants required for each discipline is eight skaters each in men's singles and women's singles, five teams in pair skating, and six teams in ice dance. Each ISU member nation is eligible to enter up to three skaters or teams per discipline in each competition, although the Kazakhstan Skating Union may enter an unlimited number of entrants in their own event. The Denis Ten Memorial Challenge has been a Challenger Series event every year since 2021.

== Senior medalists ==
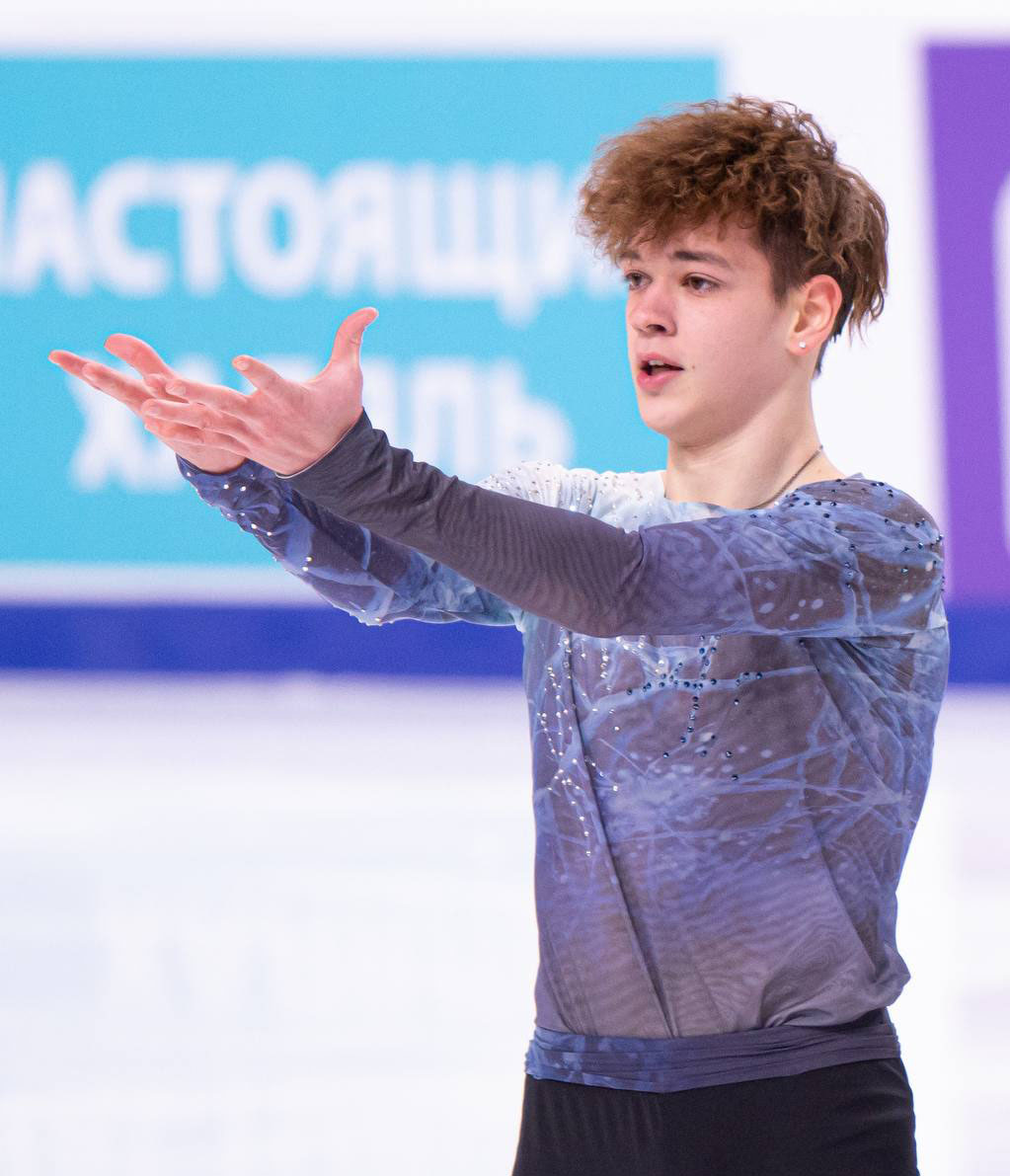
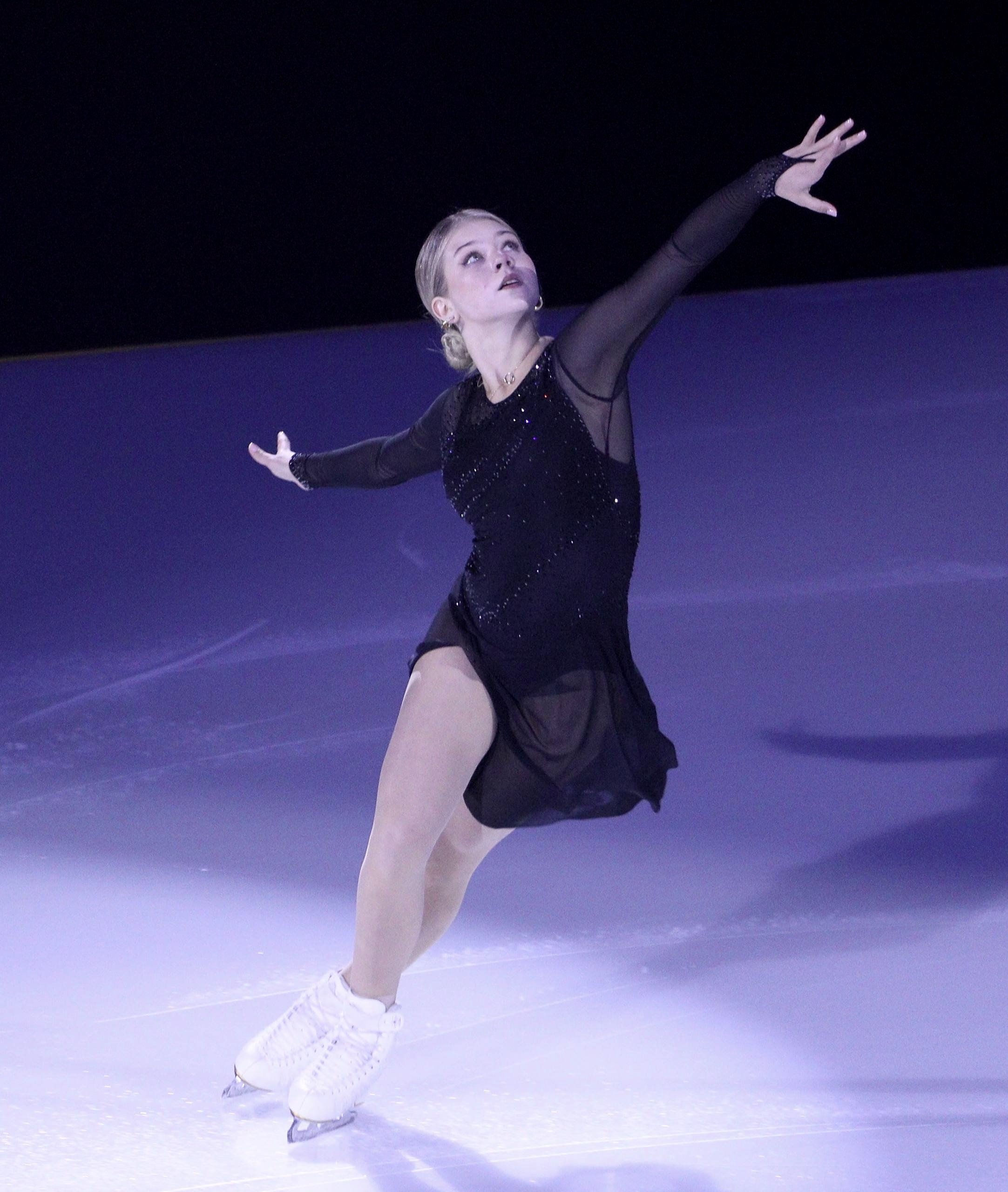
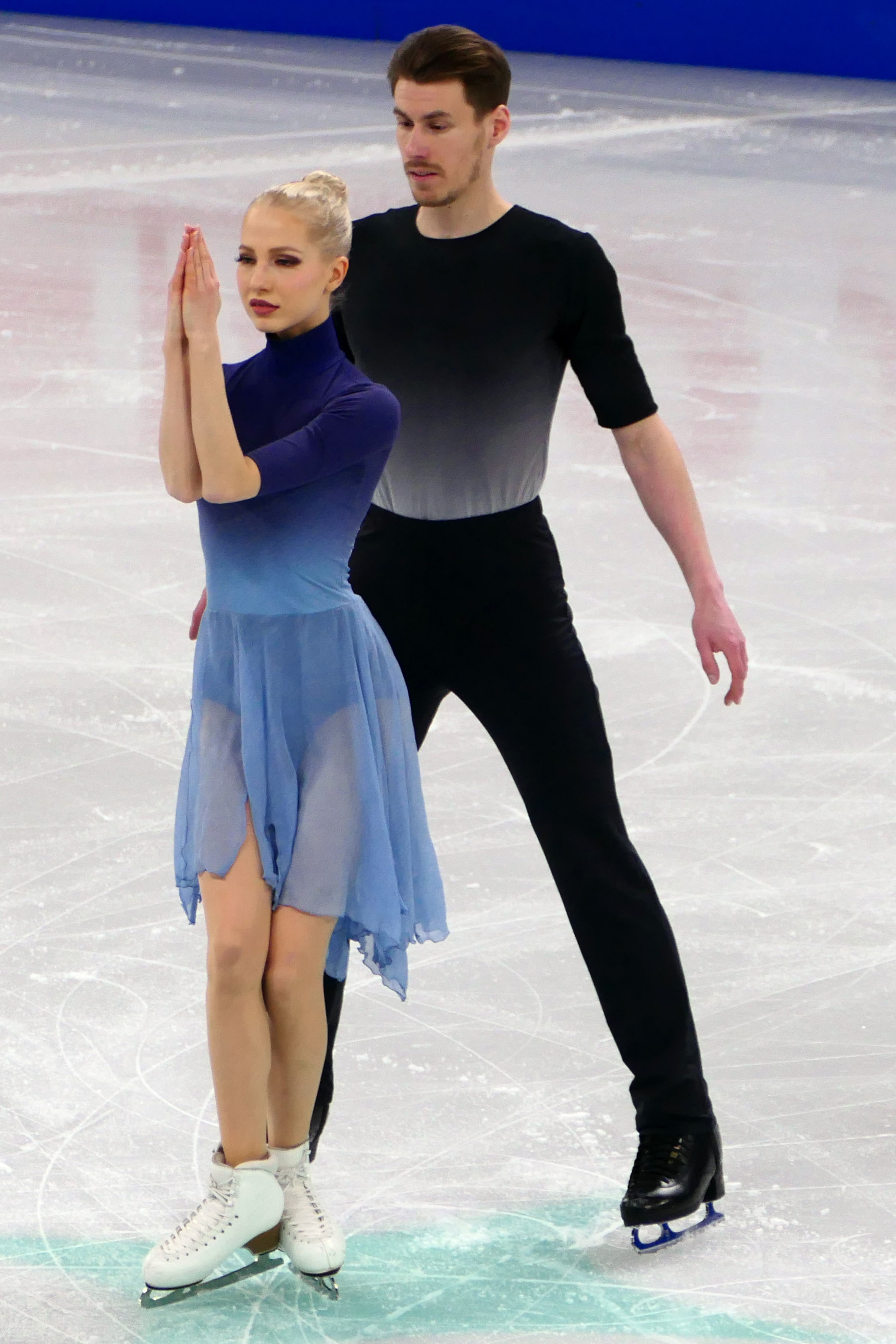
The 2026 Denis Ten Memorial Challenge champions (from left to right): Vladislav Dikidzhi of Russia (men's singles); Alexandra Ignatova of Russia (women's singles); and Juulia Turkkila and Matthias Versluis of Finland (ice dance)

CS: Challenger Series event

=== Men's singles ===
Senior men's event medalists
Year	Location	Gold	Silver	Bronze	Ref.
2019	Almaty	(Georgia (country)) Morisi Kvitelashvili	(Russia) Makar Ignatov	(Estonia) Daniel Albert Naurits	
2020	Almaty	Competition cancelled due to the COVID-19 pandemic			
2021 CS	Nur-Sultan	(Russia) Petr Gumennik	(Russia) Mark Kondratiuk	(Russia) Andrei Mozalev	
2022 CS	Almaty	(Georgia (country)) Nika Egadze	(Kazakhstan) Dias Jirenbayev	(Azerbaijan) Vladimir Litvintsev	
2023 CS	Astana	(South Korea) Lim Ju-heon	(Georgia (country)) Nika Egadze	(South Korea) Kim Han-gil	
2024 CS	Astana	(Kazakhstan) Mikhail Shaidorov	(Azerbaijan) Vladimir Litvintsev	(Georgia (country)) Nika Egadze	
2025 CS	Almaty	(Kazakhstan) Mikhail Shaidorov	(Georgia (country)) Nika Egadze	(United States) Jason Brown	
2026 CS	Almaty	(Individual Neutral Athletes) Vladislav Dikidzhi	(Individual Neutral Athletes) Gleb Lutfullin	(Individual Neutral Athletes) Petr Gumennik	

=== Women's singles ===
Senior women's event medalists
Year	Location	Gold	Silver	Bronze	Ref.
2019	Almaty	(Russia) Serafima Sakhanovich	(Russia) Anastasiia Guliakova	(Bulgaria) Alexandra Feigin	
2020	Almaty	Competition cancelled due to the COVID-19 pandemic			
2021 CS	Nur-Sultan	(Belarus) Viktoriia Safonova	(Azerbaijan) Ekaterina Ryabova	(Ukraine) Anastasiia Shabotova	
2022 CS	Almaty	(South Korea) Kim Min-chae	(Kazakhstan) Anna Levkovets	(South Korea) Choi Da-bin	
2023 CS	Astana	(Israel) Mariia Seniuk	(South Korea) Choi Da-bin	(Georgia (country)) Alina Urushadze	
2024 CS	Astana	(Georgia (country)) Anastasiia Gubanova	(Kazakhstan) Sofia Samodelkina	(Italy) Lara Naki Gutmann	
2025 CS	Almaty	(South Korea) Lee Hae-in	(South Korea) Yun Ah-sun	(Canada) Madeline Schizas	
2026 CS	Almaty	(Individual Neutral Athletes) Alexandra Ignatova	(South Korea) Kim Yu-jae	(Kazakhstan) Sofia Samodelkina	

=== Pairs ===
Senior pairs' event medalists
Year	Location	Gold	Silver	Bronze	Ref.
2019	Almaty	(Russia); Lina Kudriavtseva; Ilia Spiridonov	(Spain); Laura Barquero; Tòn Cónsul	(Spain); Dorota Broda; Pedro Betegón	
2020	Almaty	Competition cancelled due to the COVID-19 pandemic			
2021	Nur-Sultan	(Russia); Karina Akopova; Nikita Rakhmanin	(Russia); Anastasia Mukhortova; Dmitry Evgenyev	(Russia); Yasmina Kadyrova; Ivan Balchenko	
No pairs competitions since 2021

=== Ice dance ===
Senior ice dance event medalists
Year	Location	Gold	Silver	Bronze	Ref.
2019	Almaty	(Germany); Katharina Müller; Tim Dieck	(France); Adelina Galyavieva; Louis Thauron	(Kazakhstan); Maxine Weatherby; Temirlan Yerzhanov	
2020	Almaty	Competition cancelled due to the COVID-19 pandemic			
2021 CS	Nur-Sultan	(Russia); Anastasia Skoptsova; Kirill Aleshin	(Ukraine); Oleksandra Nazarova; Maxim Nikitin	(Russia); Elizaveta Khudaiberdieva; Egor Bazin	
2022 CS	Almaty	(Japan); Kana Muramoto; Daisuke Takahashi	(Germany); Jennifer Janse van Rensburg; Benjamin Steffan	(Hungary); Mariia Ignateva; Danijil Szemko	
2023 CS	Astana	(Georgia (country)); Diana Davis; Gleb Smolkin	(Germany); Jennifer Janse van Rensburg; Benjamin Steffan	(Ukraine); Mariia Pinchuk; Mykyta Pogorielov	
2024 CS	Astana	(Czech Republic); Natálie Taschlerová; Filip Taschler	(United States); Oona Brown; Gage Brown	(Canada); Alicia Fabbri; Paul Ayer	
2025 CS	Almaty	(Georgia (country)); Diana Davis; Gleb Smolkin	(United States); Oona Brown; Gage Brown	(Sweden); Milla Ruud Reitan; Nikolaj Majorov	
2026 CS	Almaty	(Finland); Juulia Turkkila; Matthias Versluis	(Individual Neutral Athletes); Vasilisa Kaganovskaia; Maxim Nekrasov	(United States); Caroline Green; Michael Parsons	

== Junior medalists ==
=== Men's singles ===
Junior men's event medalists
Year	Location	Gold	Silver	Bronze	Ref.
2019	Almaty	(Russia) Daniil Samsonov	(Russia) Artur Danielian	(Russia) Mark Kondratyuk	
2020	Almaty	Competition cancelled due to the COVID-19 pandemic			
2021	Nur-Sultan	(Russia) Vladislav Dikidzhi	(Russia) Fedor Zonov	(Russia) Semyon Soloviev	
2022	Almaty	(Kazakhstan) Artur Smagulov	(Israel) Leonid Gitelman	(Kazakhstan) Nikita Krivosheyev	
2023	Astana	(South Korea) Choi Ha-bin	(Georgia (country)) Konstantin Supatashvili	(Turkey) Ali Efe Günes	
2024	Astana	(Kazakhstan) Nikita Krivosheyev	(Kazakhstan) Artur Smagulov	(Kazakhstan) Temirlan Yakiyaev	
2025	Almaty	(Kazakhstan) Artur Smagulov	(Kazakhstan) Nikita Kozlov	(Kazakhstan) Kenan Berdibayev	
2026	Almaty	(Individual Neutral Athletes) Arsenii Fedotov	(Individual Neutral Athletes) Aleksandr Chmil	(Individual Neutral Athletes) Gleb Kovtun	

=== Women's singles ===
Junior women's event medalists
Year	Location	Gold	Silver	Bronze	Ref.
2019	Almaty	(Russia) Daria Usacheva	(Russia) Maiia Khromykh	(Bulgaria) Maria Levushkina	
2020	Almaty	Competition cancelled due to the COVID-19 pandemic			
2021	Nur-Sultan	(Russia) Sofia Samodelkina	(Russia) Elizaveta Kulikova	(Belarus) Varvara Kisel	
2022	Almaty	(Georgia (country)) Inga Gurgenidze	(South Korea) Kim Yu-seong	(Kazakhstan) Karina Issakova	
2023	Astana	(Georgia (country)) Inga Gurgenidze	(Israel) Anna Iushchenkova	(South Korea) Park Eun-bi	
2024	Astana	(Cyprus) Vasilisa Bogomolova	(Kazakhstan) Veronika Kim	(Kazakhstan) Anna Sannikova	
2025	Almaty	(South Korea) Kim Gun-hee	(South Korea) Kim Min-song	(Azerbaijan) Arina Kalugina	
2026	Almaty	(Individual Neutral Athletes) Alisa Zaikina	(Individual Neutral Athletes) Viktoriia Streltsova	(Individual Neutral Athletes) Alena Prineva	

=== Ice dance ===
Junior ice dance event medalists
Year	Location	Gold	Silver	Bronze	Ref.
2019	Almaty	No junior ice dance competitors			
2020	Almaty	Competition cancelled due to the COVID-19 pandemic			
2021	Nur-Sultan	(Russia); Vasilisa Kaganovskaia; Valeriy Angelopol	(Russia); Sofia Leonteva; Daniil Gorelkin	(Russia); Taisia Linchevskaya; Timur Babaev-Smirnov	
2022	Almaty	No junior ice dance competitors			
2023	Astana	(Germany); Darya Grimm; Michail Savitskiy	(Georgia (country)); Mariia Alieva; Yehor Barshak	(Germany); Mia Lee Mayer; Davide Calderari	
2024–25	No junior ice dance competitors				
2026	Almaty	(Individual Neutral Athletes); Mariia Fefelova; Artem Valov	(Individual Neutral Athletes); Daria Drozhzhina; Ivan Telnov	(Azerbaijan); Sofiia Beznoskiova; Max Leleu	

== Cumulative medal count (senior medalists) ==
=== Men's singles ===
Total number of Denis Ten Memorial medals in men's singles by nation
Rank	Nation	Gold	Silver	Bronze	Total
1	Georgia	2	2	1	5
2	Kazakhstan	2	1	0	3
3	Russia	1	2	1	4
4	Individual Neutral Athletes	1	1	1	3
5	South Korea	1	0	1	2
6	Azerbaijan	0	1	1	2
7	Estonia	0	0	1	1
7	United States	0	0	1	1
Totals (8 entries)		7	7	7	21

=== Women's singles ===
Total number of Denis Ten Memorial medals in women's singles by nation
Rank	Nation	Gold	Silver	Bronze	Total
1	South Korea	2	3	1	6
2	Russia	1	1	1	3
3	Georgia	1	0	1	2
4	Belarus	1	0	0	1
4	Individual Neutral Athletes	1	0	0	1
4	Israel	1	0	0	1
7	Kazakhstan	0	2	1	3
8	Azerbaijan	0	1	0	1
9	Canada	0	0	1	1
9	Italy	0	0	1	1
9	Ukraine	0	0	1	1
Totals (11 entries)		7	7	7	21

=== Pairs ===
Total number of Denis Ten Memorial medals in pairs by nation
Rank	Nation	Gold	Silver	Bronze	Total
1	Russia	2	1	1	4
2	Spain	0	1	1	2
Totals (2 entries)		2	2	2	6

=== Ice dance ===
Total number of Denis Ten Memorial medals in ice dance by nation
Rank	Nation	Gold	Silver	Bronze	Total
1	Georgia	2	0	0	2
2	Germany	1	2	0	3
3	Russia	1	0	1	2
4	Czech Republic	1	0	0	1
4	Finland	1	0	0	1
4	Japan	1	0	0	1
7	United States	0	2	1	3
8	Ukraine	0	1	1	2
9	France	0	1	0	1
9	Individual Neutral Athletes	0	1	0	1
11	Canada	0	0	1	1
11	Hungary	0	0	1	1
11	Kazakhstan	0	0	1	1
11	Sweden	0	0	1	1
Totals (14 entries)		7	7	7	21

=== Total medals ===
Total number of Denis Ten Memorial medals by nation
Rank	Nation	Gold	Silver	Bronze	Total
1	Russia	5	4	4	13
2	Georgia	5	2	2	9
3	South Korea	3	3	2	8
4	Kazakhstan	2	3	2	7
5	Individual Neutral Athletes	2	2	1	5
6	Germany	1	2	0	3
7	Belarus	1	0	0	1
7	Czech Republic	1	0	0	1
7	Finland	1	0	0	1
7	Israel	1	0	0	1
7	Japan	1	0	0	1
12	United States	0	2	2	4
13	Azerbaijan	0	2	1	3
14	Ukraine	0	1	2	3
15	Spain	0	1	1	2
16	France	0	1	0	1
17	Canada	0	0	2	2
18	Estonia	0	0	1	1
18	Hungary	0	0	1	1
18	Italy	0	0	1	1
18	Sweden	0	0	1	1
Totals (21 entries)		23	23	23	69
