= Evelyn Walsh =

Canadian pair skater (born 2001)

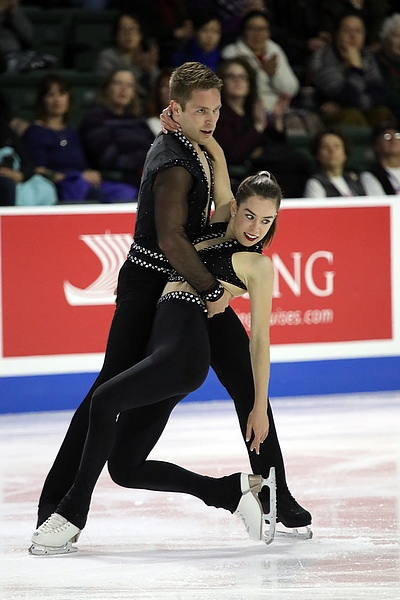
- Evelyn Walsh and Trennt Michaud at the 2018 Skate America

Personal information
- Born: July 8, 2001 (age 25) Seaforth, Ontario, Canada
- Home town: London, Ontario
- Height: 1.64 m (5 ft 4 1/2 in)

Figure skating career
- Country: Canada
- Discipline: Pair skating
- Partner: Trennt Michaud (2016–22)
- Began skating: 2003
- Retired: August 5, 2022
Four Continents Championships
Bronze medal – third place	2022 Tallinn	Pairs
Canadian Championships
Silver medal – second place	2019 Saint John	Pairs
Silver medal – second place	2020 Mississauga	Pairs
Silver medal – second place	2022 Ottawa	Pairs

Evelyn Walsh (born July 8, 2001) is a Canadian former competitive pair skater. With Trennt Michaud, she is the 2022 Four Continents bronze medalist and a three-time Canadian national silver medalist.

Earlier in their career, Walsh/Michaud won the 2017 Canadian national junior title and competed at two World Junior Championships, achieving their highest placement, fifth, in 2017.

== Personal life ==
Evelyn Walsh was born on July 8, 2001, in Stratford, Ontario, Canada. She grew up in Seaforth, Ontario, and attended St. James Catholic Elementary School before moving to London. She is the daughter of Jayne (Delaney), a secondary school teacher, and Brad Walsh, a retired elementary school teacher. She attended St. Andre Bessette Catholic Secondary School in London, Ontario.

While training as a competitive figure skater, Walsh attended Wilfrid Laurier University. Following her retirement, she transferred to the University of Western Ontario, where she also participated in varsity figure skating.

== Career ==
=== Early years ===
Walsh started learning to skate in 2003. Alison Purkiss became her coach c. 2010. She placed tenth in the novice women's event at the 2016 Canadian Championships.

=== Partnership with Michaud ===
==== 2016–17 season ====
In 2016, Walsh teamed up with Trennt Michaud. The two are coached by Alison Purkiss and Margaret Purdy in London. Making their international debut, they placed eleventh at a Junior Grand Prix (JGP) competition held in late September in Tallinn, Estonia, and fifth the following month at a JGP event in Dresden, Germany. In January 2017, they won the junior pairs' title at the Canadian Championships and were named in Canada's team to the 2017 World Junior Championships in Taipei. Competing in Taiwan, they placed sixth in the short program, fifth in the free skate, and fifth overall.

==== 2017–18 season ====
In the 2017–2018 season, Walsh and Michaud participated in two events on the Junior Grand Prix circuit, winning the bronze medal at JGP Riga Cup and placing fourth at JGP Croatia Cup.

Competing as a senior pair at the 2018 Canadian Championships, they placed fifth overall. At the 2018 World Junior Championships, the pair placed fifth in the short program, sixth in the free skate, and sixth overall.

==== 2018–19 season ====
Competing as seniors internationally in the 2018-19 season, Walsh/Michaud made their debut on the Challenger series at the Nebelhorn Trophy, where they placed seventh. For the Grand Prix series, Walsh and Michaud were initially assigned to 2018 Skate Canada International and subsequently added to the 2018 Skate America event following the withdrawal of the Chinese team of Li/Xie. They placed eighth at Skate America, following rough programs where Walsh fell five times, but fared better at Skate Canada International, finishing in fifth place.

At the 2019 Canadian Championships, Walsh/Michaud placed second in both programs, winning the silver medal behind Moore-Towers/Marinaro. Walsh, commenting on their struggles at their first two competitions that season, said, "we do truly believe everything happens for a reason." Michaud remarked that their expectations had changed considerably from the previous season when they were happy to finish fifth. They were assigned, alongside Moore-Towers/Marinaro, to compete at the Four Continents and World Championships.

Competing at Four Continents, they were in sixth place after the short program but fell to seventh overall after finishing eighth in the free skate with a performance that included an aborted lift. At the World Championships, they placed twelfth.

==== 2019–20 season ====
For their free program, Walsh/Michaud worked with retired Canadian pairs champion Eric Radford as choreographer. Walsh/Michaud made their debut at the 2019 CS Finlandia Trophy, where they placed sixth. At the 2019 Skate Canada International, their first Grand Prix assignment, they were eighth. At the 2019 Rostelecom Cup, they were fifth in the short program with a new personal best. Seventh in the free skate, they were sixth overall.

Following the conclusion of the Grand Prix series, Walsh and Michaud consulted with 2014 Olympic pairs champion Maxim Trankov to improve pair elements, in particular their triple twist lift. Skating at the 2020 Canadian Championships, they placed third in the short program, less than a point behind second-place Ilyushechkina/Bilodeau. Second in the free skate despite some under-rotations on their jumps, they won their second consecutive national silver medal. Walsh called it "the peak, I think, of our season so far, and this is exactly where we wanted to be at this point."

Walsh/Michaud placed sixth at the 2020 Four Continents Championships, again ahead of Ilyushechkina/Bilodeau. Consequently, they were afterward assigned to Canada's second pairs berth at the 2020 World Championships in Montreal. However, the championships were cancelled as a result of the coronavirus pandemic.

==== 2020–21 season ====
After the initial lockdowns, Walsh and Michaud were among the elite athletes who were cleared to train through future lockdowns. Walsh/Michaud were assigned to the 2020 Skate Canada International, but this event was also cancelled as a result of the pandemic. The team was scheduled to participate in the virtual Skate Canada Challenge in December, but Walsh sprained her ankle and was off the ice for two weeks, causing them to miss the filming period.

Despite this, on February 25, Walsh and Michaud were announced as part of the Canadian team to the 2021 World Championships in Stockholm. They placed twelfth at the World Championships.

==== 2021–22 season ====
Walsh/Michaud's outlook heading into the Olympic season was complicated by the decision of their erstwhile choreographer, former World champion Eric Radford, to return to competition alongside new partner, Vanessa James. With only two Canadian pairs berths available for the 2022 Winter Olympics, there was projected to be a fight amongst the top three Canadian teams. Walsh said, "anyone can come back into a sport. It's nothing against them. At the same time, we feel we're in a position to earn that Olympic spot, and that's what we’re chasing this year."

The team was scheduled to debut competitively at the 2021 CS Autumn Classic International but withdrew after Walsh came down with a chest infection that required two courses of antibiotics as treatment. At their first Grand Prix, 2021 Skate America, they placed eighth of eight teams. They were sixth of seven teams at the 2021 NHK Trophy, their second assignment.

At the 2022 Canadian Championships, Walsh/Michaud greatly improved on their performances earlier in the season and took the silver medal with second-place finishes in both segments. With Moore-Towers/Marinaro taking the gold medal, it was perceived that the choice for the second berth on the Canadian Olympic team would come down to Walsh/Michaud or James/Radford. The latter had withdrawn from the championships after placing fourth in the short program, having had limited training in the preceding weeks due to both skaters having COVID-19. The following day, the Canadian federation named James/Radford to the second spot. This choice was controversial, with many arguing that Walsh/Michaud had earned the assignment.

Walsh/Michaud were assigned to compete at the 2022 Four Continents Championships in Tallinn, where they placed second in the short program, taking a silver small medal. They dropped to third place in the free skate after jump and lift errors, winning the bronze medal overall. Michaud said afterward that they had "been skating so well and training so well, and we're just disappointed that we couldn't fully show all of that today."

While the team's season was originally meant to be over, longtime training partners Moore-Towers/Marinaro withdrew from the 2022 World Championships due to Moore-Towers' mental health, and first alternates Walsh/Michaud were activated. As a result of the Russian invasion of Ukraine, the International Skating Union banned all Russian and Belarusian skaters from competing at the World Championships. As well, the Chinese Skating Association opted not to send athletes to compete in Montpellier. As those countries' athletes comprised the entirety of the top five pairs at the Olympics, this greatly impacted the field. Walsh/Michaud placed eighth in the short program, sixth in the free skate, and sixth overall. Their placement, combined with the bronze medal for James/Radford, earned Canada three spots at the next year's championships.

==== Retirement ====
Walsh and Michaud had been assigned to compete on the Grand Prix for the 2022–23 season, but on August 5, it was announced that she had decided to retire and focus on her university studies, while Michaud would seek to carry on with a new partner. Walsh said of the decision that "although earlier than I envisioned within my skating career, I am stepping away from the sport that I love. I wish to thank the current and past members of the National Team for their ongoing support and to all other individuals, especially Trennt Michaud and Alison Purkiss, who significantly impacted my career."

=== In media ===
Walsh and Michaud worked on the Netflix series Spinning Out, serving as skating doubles for leads Kaya Scodelario and Evan Roderick.

== Programs ==
=== With Michaud ===
Season	Short program	Free skating	Exhibition
2021–2022	Lost Without You by Freya Ridings choreo. by Alison Purkiss	Dreaming with a Broken Heart by John Mayer choreo. by Carol Lane, Juris Razgulajevs	
2020–2021	Someone You Loved by Lewis Capaldi choreo. by Alison Purkiss	Vai Vedrai (from Cirque du Soleil) choreo. by Eric Radford	
2019–2020	Someone You Loved by Lewis Capaldi choreo. by Alison Purkiss; Bennie and the Jets by Elton John choreo. by Alison Purkiss	One by U2 performed by Cinematic Pop choreo. by Eric Radford	Bennie and the Jets by Elton John choreo. by Alison Purkiss
2018—2019	Come Together by The Beatles choreo. by Alison Purkiss	Romeo & Juliet by Abel Korzeniowski choreo. by Alison Purkiss	Show Me How You Burlesque (from Burlesque by Christina Aguilera
2017–2018	Take It All by Maury Yeston choreo. by Alison Purkiss; The Light That Never Fails by Andra Day choreo. by Alison Purkiss	Can't Help Falling in Love by Hugo Pereth choreo. by Alison Purkiss	Instead
2016–2017	El Tango de Roxanne by Mariano Mores choreo. by Alison Purkiss	Rise Up by Andra Day choreo. by Alison Purkiss	

=== Ladies' singles ===
Season	Short program	Free skating
2015–2016	Hungarian Rhapsodies	Adoration by Felix Borowski

== Competitive highlights ==
=== Pair skating with Trennt Michaud ===
Competition placements at senior level
Season	2017–18	2018–19	2019–20	2020–21	2021–22
World Championships		12th	C	12th	6th
Four Continents Championships		7th	6th		3rd
Canadian Championships	5th	2nd	2nd	C	2nd
GP NHK Trophy					6th
GP Rostelecom Cup			6th		
GP Skate America		8th			8th
GP Skate Canada		5th	8th	C	
CS Finlandia Trophy			6th		
CS Golden Spin of Zagreb					9th
CS Nebelhorn Trophy		7th			
Skate Canada Challenge	2nd	1st	1st		

Competition placements at junior level
Season	2016–17	2017–18
World Junior Championships	5th	6th
Canadian Championships	1st	
JGP Croatia		4th
JGP Estonia	11th	
JGP Germany	5th	
JGP Latvia		3rd
Bavarian Open	1st	
Skate Canada Challenge	1st	

=== Single skating ===
Event	16–17	17–18
National
Canadian Championships	12th J	14th J
SC Challenge	12th J	10th J

== Detailed results ==
=== Pair skating with Trennt Michaud ===
ISU personal best scores in the +5/-5 GOE System
Segment	Type	Score	Event
Total	TSS	179.70	2022 Four Continents Championships
Short program	TSS	65.42	2022 Four Continents Championships
Short program	TES	35.33	2022 Four Continents Championships
Short program	PCS	30.09	2022 Four Continents Championships
Free skating	TSS	116.83	2021 World Championships
Free skating	TES	58.43	2021 World Championships
Free skating	PCS	59.66	2022 Four Continents Championships

ISU personal best scores in the +3/-3 GOE System
Segment	Type	Score	Event
Total	TSS	158.96	2018 World Junior Championships
Short program	TSS	55.31	2018 World Junior Championships
Short program	TES	30.69	2017 World Junior Championships
Short program	PCS	24.80	2018 World Junior Championships
Free skating	TSS	103.65	2018 World Junior Championships
Free skating	TES	53.07	2017 JGP Latvia
Free skating	PCS	51.78	2018 World Junior Championships

- Small medals for the short program and free skating are only awarded at ISU Championships.

==== Senior level ====
Results in the 2017–18 season
Date	Event	SP		FS		Total	
Date	Event	P	Score	P	Score	P	Score
Nov 29 – Dec 3, 2017	2018 Skate Canada Challenge	2	62.30	2	114.60	2	176.90
Jan 8–14, 2018	(Canada) 2018 Canadian Championships	5	62.61	5	120.26	5	182.87

Results in the 2018–19 season
Date	Event	SP		FS		Total	
Date	Event	P	Score	P	Score	P	Score
Sep 26–29, 2018	(Germany) 2018 CS Nebelhorn Trophy	5	51.85	7	101.86	7	153.71
Oct 19–21, 2018	(United States) 2018 Skate America	8	44.71	8	84.35	8	129.06
Oct 26–28, 2018	2018 Skate Canada International	6	59.59	6	112.94	5	172.53
Nov 28 – Dec 2, 2018	2019 Skate Canada Challenge	2	56.24	1	104.42	1	160.66
Jan 13–20, 2019	(Canada) 2019 Canadian Championships	2	65.20	2	124.67	2	187.87
Feb 7–10, 2019	(United States) 2019 Four Continents Championships	6	61.91	8	97.14	7	159.05
Mar 18–24, 2019	(Japan) 2019 World Championships	12	59.84	12	114.56	12	174.40

Results in the 2018–19 season
Date	Event	SP		FS		Total	
Date	Event	P	Score	P	Score	P	Score
Oct 11–13, 2019	(Finland) 2019 CS Finlandia Trophy	8	48.03	6	103.69	6	151.72
Oct 25–27, 2019	2019 Skate Canada International	8	56.09	7	108.57	8	164.66
Nov 15–17, 2019	(Russia) 2019 Rostelecom Cup	5	62.76	7	106.20	6	168.96
Nov 27 – Dec 1, 2019	2020 Skate Canada Challenge	2	63.04	2	116.34	2	179.38
Jan 13–19, 2020	(Canada) 2020 Canadian Championships	3	70.34	2	125.95	2	196.29
Feb 4–9, 2020	(South Korea) 2020 Four Continents Championships	6	62.97	6	114.61	6	177.58

Results in the 2020–21 season
Date	Event	SP		FS		Total	
Date	Event	P	Score	P	Score	P	Score
Mar 22–28, 2021	(Sweden) 2021 World Championships	12	59.41	12	116.83	12	176.24

Results in the 2021–22 season
Date	Event	SP		FS		Total	
Date	Event	P	Score	P	Score	P	Score
Oct 22–24, 2021	(United States) 2021 Skate America	8	54.03	8	93.58	8	147.61
Nov 12–14, 2021	(Japan) 2021 NHK Trophy	6	56.97	6	111.01	6	167.98
Dec 7–11, 2021	(Croatia) 2021 CS Golden Spin of Zagreb	8	59.31	10	109.56	9	168.87
Jan 6–12, 2022	(Canada) 2022 Canadian Championships	2	66.88	2	119.64	2	186.52
Jan 18–23, 2022	(Estonia) 2022 Four Continents Championships	2	65.42	3	114.28	3	179.70
Mar 21–27, 2022	(France) 2022 World Championships	8	60.28	6	115.74	6	176.02

==== Junior level ====
Results in the 2016–17 season
Date	Event	SP		FS		Total	
Date	Event	P	Score	P	Score	P	Score
Sep 28 – Oct 1, 2016	2016 JGP Estonia	9	46.46	11	76.37	11	122.83
Oct 5–8, 2016	2016 JGP Germany	8	49.02	5	94.90	5	143.92
Nov 30 – Dec 4, 2017	2018 Skate Canada Challenge	1	56.04	1	95.86	1	151.90
Jan 16–22, 2017	(Canada) 2017 Canadian Championships (Junior)	1	56.22	1	99.51	1	155.73
Feb 14–19, 2017	(Germany) 2017 Bavarian Open	2	55.26	1	100.24	1	155.50
Mar 15–19, 2017	(Taiwan) 2017 World Junior Championships	6	51.93	5	98.81	5	150.74

Results in the 2017–18 season
Date	Event	SP		FS		Total	
Date	Event	P	Score	P	Score	P	Score
Sep 6–9, 2017	2017 JGP Latvia	5	50.15	1	103.58	3	153.73
Sep 27–30, 2017	2017 JGP Croatia	7	49.12	4	101.20	4	150.32
Feb 14–25, 2018	(Bulgaria) 2018 World Junior Championships	5	55.31	6	103.65	6	158.96
