= 2017 World Junior Figure Skating Championships =

- Type: ISU Championship
- Season: 2016–17
- Host: International figure skating
- Venue: Taipei, Taiwan

Champions
- Men's singles: (United States) Vincent Zhou
- Ladies' singles: (Russia) Alina Zagitova
- Pairs: (Australia) Ekaterina Alexandrovskaya / Harley Windsor
- Ice dance: (United States) Rachel Parsons / Michael Parsons
- Previous: 2016 World Junior Championships
- Next: 2018 World Junior Championships

The 2017 World Junior Figure Skating Championships were held March 15–19, 2017 in Taipei, Taiwan. Commonly called "World Juniors" and "Junior Worlds", the event determined the World Junior champions in the disciplines of men's singles, ladies' singles, pair skating, and ice dancing.

Pair champions Ekaterina Alexandrovskaya / Harley Windsor became the first skaters representing Australia to win gold at an ISU Figure Skating Championships. The United States received gold in two disciplines, with Vincent Zhou winning the men's singles title and Rachel Parsons / Michael Parsons taking the ice dancing title. Russia's Alina Zagitova won the ladies' title in her first appearance at the event.

== Records ==
The following new junior records were set during this competition:

Event	Component	Skater(s)	Score	Date	Ref
Men	Free skating	(Israel) Daniel Samohin	165.63	16 March 2017	
Men	Free skating	(United States) Vincent Zhou	179.24	16 March 2017	
Men	Total score	(United States) Vincent Zhou	258.11	16 March 2017	
Ice dancing	Free dance	(United States) Rachel Parsons / Michael Parsons	97.54	18 March 2017	
Ice dancing	Total score	(Russia) Alla Loboda / Pavel Drozd	164.37	18 March 2017	
Ice dancing	Total score	(United States) Rachel Parsons / Michael Parsons	164.83	18 March 2017	
Ladies	Free skating	(Russia) Alina Zagitova	138.02	18 March 2017	
Ladies	Total score	(Russia) Alina Zagitova	208.60	18 March 2017	

== Qualification ==
Skaters from all ISU member nations were eligible for the competition if they were at least 13 years old but not 19—or 21 for male pair skaters and ice dancers—before 1 July 2016 in their place of birth. National associations select their entries according to their own criteria but the ISU mandates that their selections achieve a minimum technical elements score (TES) at an international event prior to the World Junior Championships.

The term "Junior" in ISU competition refers to age, not skill level. Skaters may remain age-eligible for Junior Worlds even after competing nationally and internationally at the senior level. At junior events, the ISU requires that all programs conform to junior-specific rules regarding program length, jumping passes, types of elements, etc.

=== Minimum TES ===
Minimum technical scores (TES)
Discipline	Short	Free
Men	20	42
Ladies	20	35
Pairs	20	30
Ice dancing	18	28
Must be achieved at an ISU-recognized international event in the ongoing or preceding season. SP and FS scores may be attained at different events.

=== Number of entries per discipline ===
Based on the results of the 2016 World Junior Championships, the ISU allowed each country one to three entries per discipline.

Spots	Men	Ladies	Pairs	Dance
3	Canada; Russia; United States	Japan; Russia	Czech Republic; Russia	Russia; United States
2	China; France; Israel; Japan; Latvia; South Korea	Hungary; Kazakhstan; Latvia; South Korea; United States	Canada; Italy; Ukraine; United States	Canada; France; Italy
If not listed above, one entry is allowed.

== Schedule ==
Day	Date	Start	Discipline	Event
Day 1	15.03.2017	10:30	Men	Short program
Day 1	15.03.2017			Opening ceremony
Day 1	15.03.2017	19:00	Pairs	Short program
Day 2	16.03.2017	11:30	Dance	Short dance
Day 2	16.03.2017	17:30	Men	Free skating
Day 2	16.03.2017		Men	Victory ceremony
Day 3	17.03.2017	11:00	Ladies	Short program
Day 3	17.03.2017	19:00	Pairs	Free skating
Day 3	17.03.2017		Pairs	Victory ceremony
Day 4	18.03.2017	11:30	Dance	Free dance
Day 4	18.03.2017		Dance	Victory ceremony
Day 4	18.03.2017		Ladies	Free skating
Day 4	18.03.2017	16:00	Ladies	Victory ceremony

== Entries ==
Some member nations announced their selections in January or early February 2017. The International Skating Union published the full list of entries on 24 February 2017.

Country	Men	Ladies	Pairs	Ice dancing
Australia	James Min	Holly Harris	Ekaterina Alexandrovskaya / Harley Windsor	Matilda Friend / William Badaoui
Austria		Alisa Stomakhina		Elizaveta Orlova / Stephano Valentino Schuster
Azerbaijan		Morgan Flood		
Belarus	Yakau Zenko	Hanna Paroshyna		Emiliya Kalehanova / Uladzislau Palkhouski
Bulgaria	Ivo Gatovski	Alexandra Feigin		Yana Bozhilova / Kaloyan Georgiev
Canada	Nicolas Nadeau; Roman Sadovsky; Conrad Orzel	Sarah Tamura	Evelyn Walsh / Trennt Michaud; Lori-Ann Matte / Thierry Ferland	Marjorie Lajoie / Zachary Lagha; Ashlynne Stairs / Lee Royer
China	Li Tangxu; Li Yuheng	Li Xiangning	Gao Yumeng / Xie Zhong	Guo Yuzhu / Zhao Pengkun
Chinese Taipei	Chih-I Tsao	Amy Lin		
Croatia		Hana Cvijanović		
Czech Republic	Petr Kotlařík	Michaela Lucie Hanzlíková		Nicole Kuzmichova / Alexandr Sinicyn
Estonia	Daniel Albert Naurits	Kristina Škuleta-Gromova		Viktoria Semenjuk / Artur Gruzdev
Finland	Benjam Papp	Viveca Lindfors		Monica Lindfors / Juho Pirinen
France	Kévin Aymoz; Luc Economides	Julie Frötscher	Cléo Hamon / Denys Strekalin	Angélique Abachkina / Louis Thauron; Natacha Lagouge / Corentin Rahier
Georgia	Irakli Maysuradze			Eva Khachaturian / Georgy Reviya
Germany	Thomas Stoll	Lea Johanna Dastich	Talisa Thomalla / Robert Kunkel	Ria Schwendinger / Valentin Wunderlich
(United Kingdom) Great Britain	Graham Newberry	Kristen Spours		Sasha Fear / Elliot Verburg
Hong Kong		Yi Christy Leung		Wing Yi Valeria So / Marcus Yau
Hungary	Alexander Borovoj	Daria Jakab; Fruzsina Medgyesi		Hanna Jakucs / Daniel Illes
Israel	Mark Gorodnitsky; Daniel Samohin	Paige Conners	Hailey Esther Kops / Artem Tsoglin	Shira Ichilov / Vadim Davidovich
Italy	Matteo Rizzo	Elisabetta Leccardi	Irma Caldara / Edoardo Caputo	Flora Mühlmeyer / Pietro Papetti
Japan	Kazuki Tomono; Koshiro Shimada	Marin Honda; Kaori Sakamoto; Yuna Shiraiwa	Riku Miura / Shoya Ichihashi	Rikako Fukase / Aru Tateno
Kazakhstan	Artur Panikhin	Aiza Mambekova		Hannah Grace Cook / Temirlan Yerzhanov
Latvia	Gļebs Basins	Diāna Ņikitina		
Lithuania		Elžbieta Kropa		Guostė Damulevičiūtė / Deividas Kizala
Malaysia	Kai Xiang Chew			
Mexico	Donovan Carrillo	Andrea Montesinos Cantu		
Monaco	Davide Lewton Brain			
Norway	Sondre Oddvoll Bøe	Juni Marie Benjaminsen		
Poland	Ryszard Gurtler			Olexandra Borysova / Cezary Zawadzki
Romania		Amanda Stan		
Russia	Dmitri Aliev; Alexander Petrov; Alexander Samarin	Alina Zagitova; Stanislava Konstantinova; Polina Tsurskaya	Aleksandra Boikova / Dmitrii Kozlovskii; Amina Atakhanova / Ilia Spiridonov; Alina Ustimkina / Nikita Volodin	Anastasia Shpilevaya / Grigory Smirnov; Alla Loboda / Pavel Drozd; Anastasia Skoptsova / Kirill Aleshin
Serbia		Leona Rogić		
Singapore		Chloe Ing		
Slovakia	Jakub Kršňák	Alexandra Hagarová		
Slovenia		Nina Polšak		
South Africa	Matthew Samuels			
South Korea	Cha Jun-hwan; Lee Si-hyeong	Lim Eun-soo; An So-hyun	Kim Su-yeon / Kim Hyung-tae	
Spain	Aleix Gabara	Valentina Matos	Alexanne Bouillon / Tòn Cónsul	Malene Niquita-Basquin / Jaime García
Sweden	Nikolaj Majorov	Anita Östlund		
Switzerland	Nurullah Sahaka	Yoonmi Lehmann		
Turkey	Başar Oktar	Güzide Irmak Bayır		
Ukraine	Yaroslav Paniot	Anastasia Hozhva		Darya Popova / Volodymyr Byelikov
United States	Alexei Krasnozhon; Andrew Torgashev; Vincent Zhou	Starr Andrews; Bradie Tennell	Chelsea Liu / Brian Johnson; Nica Digerness / Danny Neudecker	Christina Carreira / Anthony Ponomarenko; Lorraine McNamara / Quinn Carpenter; Rachel Parsons / Michael Parsons

=== Changes to initial assignments ===
Announced	Discipline	Country	Initial	Replacement	Ref
27 February 2017	Men	Sweden	Gabriel Folkesson	Nikolaj Majorov	
27 February 2017	Ladies	South Korea	Kim Ye-lim	An So-hyun	
1 March 2017	Men	Netherlands	Michel Tsiba	—N/a	
1 March 2017	Ladies	Netherlands	Caya Scheepens	—N/a	
1 March 2017	Ladies	Finland	Emmi Peltonen	Viveca Lindfors	
1 March 2017	Ice dance	Ukraine	Maria Golubtsova / Kirill Belobrov	Darya Popova / Volodymyr Byelikov	
3 March 2017	Ladies	United States	Amber Glenn	Starr Andrews	
6 March 2017	Men	Hong Kong	Harrison Jon-Yen Wong	—N/a	
6 March 2017	Ladies	Kazakhstan	Elizabet Tursynbayeva	—N/a	

== Results ==
=== Men ===
Vincent Zhou set a new junior world record for the free skating (179.24 points) and for the combined total (258.11 points). Daniel Samohin set a new junior world record for the free skating (165.63 points) but the record was later broken by Zhou.

Rank	Name	Nation	Total points	SP		FS	
1	Vincent Zhou	United States	258.11	5	78.87	1	179.24
2	Dmitri Aliev	Russia	247.31	1	83.48	3	163.83
3	Alexander Samarin	Russia	245.53	3	82.23	4	163.30
4	Alexander Petrov	Russia	243.47	4	81.29	5	162.18
5	Cha Jun-hwan	South Korea	242.45	2	82.34	6	160.11
6	Daniel Samohin	Israel	232.63	16	67.00	2	165.63
7	Kévin Aymoz	France	218.63	6	77.24	8	141.39
8	Alexei Krasnozhon	United States	211.47	8	76.50	10	134.97
9	Kazuki Tomono	Japan	211.28	14	68.12	7	143.16
10	Yaroslav Paniot	Ukraine	208.57	10	72.03	9	136.54
11	Matteo Rizzo	Italy	197.47	13	68.53	11	128.94
12	Nicolas Nadeau	Canada	196.63	7	77.20	15	119.43
13	Conrad Orzel	Canada	194.41	18	66.21	12	128.20
14	Koshiro Shimada	Japan	194.10	12	68.77	13	125.33
15	Graham Newberry	(United Kingdom) Great Britain	191.78	11	70.80	14	120.98
16	Lee Si-hyeong	South Korea	186.67	15	67.51	16	119.16
17	Roman Sadovsky	Canada	186.53	9	76.27	23	110.26
18	Chih-I Tsao	Chinese Taipei	181.89	20	63.17	17	118.72
19	Sondre Oddvoll Bøe	Norway	178.98	19	66.16	18	112.82
20	Daniel Albert Naurits	Estonia	178.48	17	66.44	20	112.04
21	Li Tangxu	China	173.08	21	62.08	22	111.00
22	Mark Gorodnitsky	Israel	170.59	22	59.27	21	111.32
23	Petr Kotlařík	Czech Republic	168.79	24	56.66	19	112.13
24	Thomas Stoll	Germany	153.68	23	57.10	24	96.58
Did not advance to free skating
25	Andrew Torgashev	United States	55.42	25	55.42	—N/a	
26	Başar Oktar	Turkey	54.17	26	54.17	—N/a	
27	Donovan Carrillo	Mexico	53.92	27	53.92	—N/a	
28	Li Yuheng	China	53.76	28	53.76	—N/a	
29	James Min	Australia	53.72	29	53.72	—N/a	
30	Luc Economides	France	53.52	30	53.52	—N/a	
31	Nikolaj Majorov	Sweden	52.42	31	52.42	—N/a	
32	Artur Panikhin	Kazakhstan	51.72	32	51.72	—N/a	
33	Yakau Zenko	Belarus	50.92	33	50.92	—N/a	
34	Nurullah Sahaka	Switzerland	50.58	34	50.58	—N/a	
35	Irakli Maysuradze	Georgia	48.66	35	48.66	—N/a	
36	Jakub Kršňák	Slovakia	48.60	36	48.60	—N/a	
37	Ivo Gatovski	Bulgaria	48.05	37	48.05	—N/a	
38	Aleix Gabara	Spain	47.82	38	47.82	—N/a	
39	Gļebs Basins	Latvia	45.70	39	45.70	—N/a	
40	Ryszard Gurtler	Poland	45.41	40	45.41	—N/a	
41	Alexander Borovoj	Hungary	45.41	41	45.41	—N/a	
42	Kai Xiang Chew	Malaysia	44.23	42	44.23	—N/a	
43	Davide Lewton Brain	Monaco	44.14	43	44.14	—N/a	
44	Benjam Papp	Finland	43.51	44	43.51	—N/a	
45	Matthew Samuels	South Africa	41.68	45	41.68	—N/a	

=== Ladies ===
Alina Zagitova set a new junior world record for the free skating (138.02 points) and for the combined total (208.60 points).

Rank	Name	Nation	Total points	SP		FS	
1	Alina Zagitova	Russia	208.60	1	70.58	1	138.02
2	Marin Honda	Japan	201.61	2	68.35	2	133.26
3	Kaori Sakamoto	Japan	195.54	3	67.78	3	127.76
4	Lim Eun-soo	South Korea	180.81	4	64.78	4	116.03
5	Yuna Shiraiwa	Japan	174.38	5	62.96	5	111.42
6	Stanislava Konstantinova	Russia	162.84	6	58.90	6	103.94
7	Bradie Tennell	United States	161.36	7	57.47	7	103.89
8	Lea Johanna Dastich	Germany	157.11	13	53.95	8	103.16
9	Yi Christy Leung	Hong Kong	156.26	8	56.01	10	100.25
10	Polina Tsurskaya	Russia	155.91	11	54.30	9	101.61
11	Li Xiangning	China	151.03	12	54.24	11	96.79
12	Starr Andrews	United States	149.05	9	55.83	12	93.22
13	Anita Östlund	Sweden	144.57	15	52.18	13	92.39
14	Viveca Lindfors	Finland	143.53	10	55.50	15	88.03
15	Kristen Spours	(United Kingdom) Great Britain	139.34	16	49.83	14	89.51
16	Michaela Lucie Hanzlíková	Czech Republic	134.48	21	48.10	16	86.38
17	Sarah Tamura	Canada	130.40	19	49.57	18	80.83
18	Elisabetta Leccardi	Italy	129.33	14	52.62	21	76.71
19	Andrea Montesinos Cantu	Mexico	128.55	24	44.66	17	83.89
20	An So-hyun	South Korea	126.82	17	49.75	20	77.07
21	Amy Lin	Chinese Taipei	125.91	18	49.59	22	76.32
22	Güzide Irmak Bayır	Turkey	123.23	22	45.40	19	77.83
23	Holly Harris	Australia	123.11	20	48.24	24	74.87
24	Valentina Matos	Spain	120.41	23	45.40	23	75.01
Did not advance to free skating
25	Alexandra Feigin	Bulgaria	44.45	25	44.45	—N/a	
26	Anastasia Gozhva	Ukraine	44.21	26	44.21	—N/a	
27	Paige Conners	Israel	43.45	27	43.45	—N/a	
28	Kristina Škuleta-Gromova	Estonia	42.70	28	42.70	—N/a	
29	Yoonmi Lehmann	Switzerland	41.97	29	41.97	—N/a	
30	Diāna Ņikitina	Latvia	39.39	30	39.39	—N/a	
31	Aiza Mambekova	Kazakhstan	39.38	31	39.38	—N/a	
32	Fruzsina Medgyesi	Hungary	39.15	32	39.15	—N/a	
33	Amanda Stan	Romania	38.29	33	38.29	—N/a	
34	Chloe Ing	Singapore	38.22	34	38.22	—N/a	
35	Julie Frötscher	France	38.20	35	38.20	—N/a	
36	Morgan Flood	Azerbaijan	36.47	36	36.47	—N/a	
37	Hanna Paroshyna	Belarus	36.44	37	36.44	—N/a	
38	Elžbieta Kropa	Lithuania	35.14	38	35.14	—N/a	
39	Hana Cvijanović	Croatia	34.22	39	34.22	—N/a	
40	Alisa Stomakhina	Austria	32.95	40	32.95	—N/a	
41	Daria Jakab	Hungary	32.34	41	32.34	—N/a	
42	Alexandra Hagarová	Slovakia	32.26	42	32.26	—N/a	
43	Juni Marie Benjaminsen	Norway	31.83	43	31.83	—N/a	
44	Nina Polšak	Slovenia	29.95	44	29.95	—N/a	
WD	Leona Rogić	Serbia				—N/a	

=== Pairs ===
Alexandrovskaya/Windsor won Australia's first Junior Worlds medal in 41 years — since 1976, when Elizabeth Cain / Peter Cain took the pairs' bronze medal. They also became the first skaters representing Australia to receive gold at an ISU Figure Skating Championships.

Rank	Name	Nation	Total points	SP		FS	
1	Ekaterina Alexandrovskaya / Harley Windsor	Australia	163.98	3	59.82	2	104.16
2	Aleksandra Boikova / Dmitrii Kozlovskii	Russia	161.93	1	61.27	4	100.66
3	Gao Yumeng / Xie Zhong	China	161.09	2	59.97	3	101.12
4	Amina Atakhanova / Ilia Spiridonov	Russia	157.76	8	50.20	1	107.56
5	Evelyn Walsh / Trennt Michaud	Canada	150.74	6	51.93	5	98.81
6	Alina Ustimkina / Nikita Volodin	Russia	145.69	4	54.63	6	91.06
7	Chelsea Liu / Brian Johnson	United States	138.95	5	53.32	8	85.63
8	Kim Su-yeon / Kim Hyung-tae	South Korea	135.29	9	49.20	7	86.09
9	Lori-Ann Matte / Thierry Ferland	Canada	128.29	7	50.78	12	77.51
10	Nica Digerness / Danny Neudecker	United States	127.49	13	44.06	9	83.43
11	Hailey Esther Kops / Artem Tsoglin	Israel	126.06	12	45.80	10	80.26
12	Talisa Thomalla / Robert Kunkel	Germany	124.94	10	47.30	11	77.64
13	Riku Miura / Shoya Ichihashi	Japan	120.19	11	46.90	13	73.29
14	Cléo Hamon / Denys Strekalin	France	114.68	14	43.28	14	71.40
15	Irma Caldara / Edoardo Caputo	Italy	109.89	15	42.29	15	67.60
16	Alexanne Bouillon / Tòn Cónsul	Spain	105.59	16	40.07	16	65.52

=== Ice dancing ===
Rachel and Michael Parsons set a new junior world record for the free dance (97.54 points) and for the combined total (164.83 points). Alla Loboda and Pavel Drozd set a new junior world record for the combined total (164.37 points) but the record was later broken by Parsons/Parsons.

Rank	Name	Nation	Total points	SD		FD	
1	Rachel Parsons / Michael Parsons	United States	164.83	2	67.29	1	97.54
2	Alla Loboda / Pavel Drozd	Russia	164.37	1	67.59	2	96.78
3	Christina Carreira / Anthony Ponomarenko	United States	154.68	6	60.53	3	94.15
4	Anastasia Shpilevaya / Grigory Smirnov	Russia	152.66	4	63.26	4	89.40
5	Anastasia Skoptsova / Kirill Aleshin	Russia	152.53	3	63.38	5	89.15
6	Marjorie Lajoie / Zachary Lagha	Canada	148.26	5	60.79	7	87.47
7	Lorraine McNamara / Quinn Carpenter	United States	148.11	7	60.30	6	87.81
8	Angélique Abachkina / Louis Thauron	France	140.61	9	54.92	8	85.69
9	Nicole Kuzmichová / Alexandr Sinicyn	Czech Republic	134.17	10	53.93	9	80.24
10	Ria Schwendinger / Valentin Wunderlich	Germany	131.77	13	51.90	10	79.87
11	Natacha Lagouge / Corentin Rahier	France	130.08	8	55.41	11	74.67
12	Darya Popova / Volodymyr Byelikov	Ukraine	126.88	11	52.47	12	74.41
13	Rikako Fukase / Aru Tateno	Japan	124.03	15	50.44	13	73.59
14	Ashlynne Stairs / Lee Royer	Canada	122.54	12	52.26	15	70.28
15	Sasha Fear / Elliot Verburg	(United Kingdom) Great Britain	121.40	17	49.19	14	72.21
16	Emiliya Kalehanova / Uladzislau Palkhouski	Belarus	118.81	14	50.75	16	68.06
17	Guostė Damulevičiūtė / Deividas Kizala	Lithuania	111.19	16	50.18	17	61.01
18	Eva Khachaturian / Georgy Reviya	Georgia	105.91	18	45.69	18	60.22
19	Monica Lindfors / Juho Pirinen	Finland	102.66	20	44.62	19	58.04
20	Hanna Jakucs / Daniel Illes	Hungary	101.63	19	45.61	20	56.02
Did not advance to free dance
21	Viktoria Semenjuk / Artur Gruzdev	Estonia	44.51	21	44.51	—N/a	
22	Hannah Grace Cook / Temirlan Yerzhanov	Kazakhstan	42.94	22	42.94	—N/a	
23	Guo Yuzhu / Zhao Pengkun	China	42.20	23	42.20	—N/a	
24	Flora Mühlmeyer / Pietro Papetti	Italy	41.24	24	41.24	—N/a	
25	Matilda Friend / William Badaoui	Australia	40.24	25	40.24	—N/a	
26	Shira Ichilov / Vadim Davidovich	Israel	39.34	26	39.34	—N/a	
27	Malene Niquita-Basquin / Jaime García	Spain	38.49	27	38.49	—N/a	
28	Elizaveta Orlova / Stephano Valentino Schuster	Austria	38.14	28	38.14	—N/a	
29	Olexandra Borysova / Cezary Zawadzki	Poland	37.68	29	37.68	—N/a	
30	Wing Yi Valerie So / Marcus Yau	Hong Kong	35.31	30	35.31	—N/a	
31	Yana Bozhilova / Kaloyan Georgiev	Bulgaria	34.29	31	34.29	—N/a	

== Medals summary ==
=== Medalists ===
Medals for overall placement:

Discipline	Gold	Silver	Bronze
Men	(United States) Vincent Zhou	(Russia) Dmitri Aliev	(Russia) Alexander Samarin
Ladies	(Russia) Alina Zagitova	(Japan) Marin Honda	(Japan) Kaori Sakamoto
Pairs	(Australia) Ekaterina Alexandrovskaya / Harley Windsor	(Russia) Aleksandra Boikova / Dmitrii Kozlovskii	(China) Gao Yumeng / Xie Zhong
Ice dancing	(United States) Rachel Parsons / Michael Parsons	(Russia) Alla Loboda / Pavel Drozd	(United States) Christina Carreira / Anthony Ponomarenko

Small medals for placement in the short segment:

Discipline	Gold	Silver	Bronze
Men	(Russia) Dmitri Aliev	(South Korea) Cha Jun-hwan	(Russia) Alexander Samarin
Ladies	(Russia) Alina Zagitova	(Japan) Marin Honda	(Japan) Kaori Sakamoto
Pairs	(Russia) Aleksandra Boikova / Dmitrii Kozlovskii	(China) Gao Yumeng / Xie Zhong	(Australia) Ekaterina Alexandrovskaya / Harley Windsor
Ice dancing	(Russia) Alla Loboda / Pavel Drozd	(United States) Rachel Parsons / Michael Parsons	(Russia) Anastasia Skoptcova / Kirill Aleshin

Small medals for placement in the free segment:

Discipline	Gold	Silver	Bronze
Men	(United States) Vincent Zhou	(Israel) Daniel Samohin	(Russia) Dmitri Aliev
Ladies	(Russia) Alina Zagitova	(Japan) Marin Honda	(Japan) Kaori Sakamoto
Pairs	(Russia) Amina Atakhanova / Ilia Spiridonov	(Australia) Ekaterina Alexandrovskaya / Harley Windsor	(China) Gao Yumeng / Xie Zhong
Ice dancing	(United States) Rachel Parsons / Michael Parsons	(Russia) Alla Loboda / Pavel Drozd	(United States) Christina Carreira / Anthony Ponomarenko

=== By country ===
Table of medals for overall placement:

Rank	Nation	Gold	Silver	Bronze	Total
1	United States (USA)	2	0	1	3
2	Russia (RUS)	1	3	1	5
3	Australia (AUS)	1	0	0	1
4	Japan (JPN)	0	1	1	2
5	China (CHN)	0	0	1	1
Totals (5 entries)		4	4	4	12

== See also ==
- List of sporting events in Taiwan
