= Figure skating at the 2016 Winter Youth Olympics =

Figure skating at the II Winter Youth Olympic Games
- Venue: Hamar Olympic Amphitheatre
- Dates: 12–21 February
- Competitors: 76

Figure skating at the 2016 Winter Youth Olympics took place at the Hamar Olympic Amphitheatre in Hamar, Norway from 12 to 21 February 2016.

Unique to the Youth Olympic Games was a mixed NOC team trophy competition.

== Medal summary ==
=== Events ===
Discipline	Gold	Silver	Bronze
Men	Sōta Yamamoto; Japan	Deniss Vasiļjevs; Latvia	Dmitri Aliev; Russia
Ladies	Polina Tsurskaya; Russia	Maria Sotskova; Russia	Elizabet Tursynbayeva; Kazakhstan
Pairs	Ekaterina Borisova / Dmitry Sopot; Russia	Anna Dušková / Martin Bidař; Czech Republic	Alina Ustimkina / Nikita Volodin; Russia
Ice dancing	Anastasia Shpilevaya / Grigory Smirnov; Russia	Chloe Lewis / Logan Bye; United States	Anastasia Skoptcova / Kirill Aleshin; Russia
Mixed NOC team	Team Desire (MIX); Dmitri Aliev (RUS); Li Xiangning (CHN); Sarah Rose / Joseph Goodpaster (USA); Anastasia Skoptcova / Kirill Aleshin (RUS)	Team Future (MIX); Ivan Shmuratko (UKR); Diāna Ņikitina (LAT); Anna Dušková / Martin Bidař (CZE); Julia Wagret / Mathieu Couyras (FRA)	Team Discovery (MIX); Deniss Vasiļjevs (LAT); Fruzsina Medgyesi (HUN); Gao Yumeng / Li Bowen (CHN); Marjorie Lajoie / Zachary Lagha (CAN)

=== Medal table ===
Rank	Nation	Gold	Silver	Bronze	Total
1	Russia	3	1	3	7
–	Mixed-NOCs	1	1	1	3
2	Japan	1	0	0	1
3	Czech Republic	0	1	0	1
3	Latvia	0	1	0	1
3	United States	0	1	0	1
6	Kazakhstan	0	0	1	1
Totals (6 entries)		5	5	5	15

== Eligibility ==
Skaters were eligible to participate at the 2016 Winter Youth Olympics if they were born between 1 January 1999 and 31 December 2001, except males in pairs and ice dance, who may be born between 1 January 1997 and 31 December 2000.

== Qualification system ==
The overall quota for the figure skating competition was 76 total skaters, consisting of 38 men and 38 ladies. There were 16 skaters in each of the single skating disciplines (men's and ladies'), 10 pair skating teams, and 12 ice dancing team. The maximum number of entries that qualified by a National Olympic Committee was 2 per event, making 12 (6 men, 6 ladies) the maximum number of entries that a country could qualify.

If a country placed a skater in the first, second or third position in a 2015 World Junior Figure Skating Championships discipline they qualified for two spots in that discipline at the Youth Olympics. All other nations could enter one athlete until a quota spot of twelve for each singles event, seven for pairs and nine for ice dancing, was reached. There were further four spots for each single event and three spots for pairs/ice dancing at the 2015–16 ISU Junior Grand Prix.

== Number of entries per discipline ==
Based on the results of the 2015 World Junior Championships and the 2015–16 ISU Junior Grand Prix series, the following countries have earned YOG quota places.

Spots	Men	Ladies	Pairs	Dance
2	Japan; China	Russia; Japan	China; Canada Note 1 Russia	Russia; United States Note 2 Ukraine
1	United States; Russia; Latvia; Israel; South Korea; Argentina; Canada; Ukraine; Italy; Malaysia; France; Finland	Kazakhstan; United States; South Korea; Latvia; Slovakia; Armenia; Finland; Germany; China; Hungary; Italy; Norway Note 3	United States; Ukraine; Czech Republic; South Korea; ~~Great Britain~~ Note 4 Italy (added)	Canada; ~~Poland~~ Note 4 France; ~~South Korea~~ Note 4 Italy; ~~Czech Republic~~ Note 4 Germany; Lithuania (added); Belarus (added); Estonia (added)

Notes

1. Canada will send only one pair.
2. USA will send only one ice dance couple.
3. As the host, Norway has the right to one entry per discipline and has decided to enter one lady.
4. Did not use their YOG quota place.

=== Summary ===
Nations	Boys' singles	Girls' singles	Pair skating	Ice dancing	Athlete(s)
Argentina	1	0	0	0	1
Armenia	0	1	0	0	1
Belarus	0	0	0	1	2
Canada	1	0	1	1	5
China	2	1	2	0	7
Czech Republic	0	0	1	0	2
Estonia	0	0	0	1	2
Finland	1	1	0	0	2
France	1	0	0	1	3
Germany	0	1	0	1	3
Hungary	0	1	0	0	1
Israel	1	0	0	0	1
Italy	1	1	1	1	6
Japan	2	2	0	0	4
Kazakhstan	0	1	0	0	1
Latvia	1	1	0	0	2
Lithuania	0	0	0	1	2
Malaysia	1	0	0	0	1
Norway	0	1	0	0	1
Russia	1	2	2	2	11
Slovakia	0	1	0	0	1
South Korea	1	1	1	0	4
Ukraine	1	0	1	2	7
United States	1	1	1	1	6
Total: 24 NOCs	16	16	10	12	76

== Entries ==
Some countries announced their selections in 2015, as early as October. The International Skating Union published a complete list of entries on 4 February 2016.

Country	Men	Ladies	Pairs	Ice dancing
Argentina	Mauro Calcagno			
Armenia		Anastasia Galustyan		
Belarus				Emilia Kalehanava / Uladzislau Palkhouski
Canada	Roman Sadovsky		Justine Brasseur / Mathieu Ostiguy	Marjorie Lajoie / Zachary Lagha
China	Li Tangxu; Lu Yunda	Li Xiangning	Zhao Ying / Xie Zhong; Gao Yumeng / Li Bowen	
Czech Republic			Anna Dušková / Martin Bidař	
Estonia				Viktoria Semenjuk / Artur Gruzdev
Finland	Lauri Lankila	Anni Järvenpää		
France	Adam Siao Him Fa			Julia Wagret / Mathieu Couyras
Germany		Annika Hocke		Charise Matthaei / Maximilian Pfisterer
Hungary		Fruzsina Medgyesi		
Israel	Mark Gorodnitsky			
Italy	Adrien Bannister	Lucrezia Gennaro	Irma Caldara / Edoardo Caputo	Francesca Righi / Pietro Papetti
Japan	Sota Yamamoto; Koshiro Shimada	Yuna Shiraiwa; Kaori Sakamoto		
Kazakhstan		Elizabet Tursynbayeva		
Latvia	Deniss Vasiļjevs	Diāna Ņikitina		
Lithuania				Guostė Damulevičiūtė / Deividas Kizala
Malaysia	Kai Xiang Chew			
Norway		Juni Marie Benjaminsen		
Russia	Dmitri Aliev	Maria Sotskova; Polina Tsurskaya	Ekaterina Borisova / Dmitry Sopot; Alina Ustimkina / Nikita Volodin	Anastasia Shpilevaya / Grigory Smirnov; Anastasia Skoptsova / Kirill Aleshin
Slovakia		Alexandra Hagarová		
South Korea	Cha Jun-hwan	Byun Ji-hyun	Kim Su-yeon / Kim Hyung-tae	
Ukraine	Ivan Shmuratko		Anastasia Pobizhenko / Dmytro Sharpar	Maria Holubtsova / Kyrylo Byelobrov; Anzhelika Yurchenko / Volodymyr Byelikov
United States	Camden Pulkinen	Vanna Giang	Sarah Rose / Joseph Goodpaster	Chloe Lewis / Logan Bye

== Time schedule ==
Figure skating events will take place 13–16 February 2016.

== Results ==
=== Men ===
Rank	Name	Nation	Total points	SP		FS	
1	Sōta Yamamoto	Japan	215.52	1	73.07	3	142.45
2	Deniss Vasiļjevs	Latvia	214.43	3	70.16	1	144.27
3	Dmitri Aliev	Russia	209.77	5	67.24	2	142.53
4	Roman Sadovsky	Canada	205.69	2	72.61	4	133.08
5	Cha Jun-hwan	South Korea	198.90	4	68.76	5	130.14
6	Koshiro Shimada	Japan	182.52	6	63.18	6	119.34
7	Camden Pulkinen	United States	166.59	7	57.91	8	108.68
8	Li Tangxu	China	165.70	9	49.19	7	116.51
9	Adrien Bannister	Italy	153.39	10	46.68	9	106.71
10	Adam Siao Him Fa	France	150.65	8	49.19	10	101.46
11	Kai Xiang Chew	Malaysia	137.47	11	46.53	13	90.94
12	Lu Yunda	China	137.26	13	44.20	11	93.06
13	Mark Gorodnitsky	Israel	135.78	12	44.48	12	91.30
14	Ivan Shmuratko	Ukraine	125.78	14	42.39	14	83.39
15	Lauri Lankila	Finland	92.08	15	30.65	15	61.43
16	Mauro Calcagno	Argentina	79.50	16	23.92	16	55.58

=== Ladies ===
Rank	Name	Nation	Total points	SP		FS	
1	Polina Tsurskaya	Russia	186.04	4	58.65	1	127.39
2	Maria Sotskova	Russia	169.50	8	53.40	2	116.10
3	Elizabet Tursynbayeva	Kazakhstan	167.88	2	59.11	3	108.77
4	Yuna Shiraiwa	Japan	166.66	1	60.87	5	105.79
5	Diāna Ņikitina	Latvia	165.60	3	58.81	4	106.79
6	Kaori Sakamoto	Japan	155.23	5	56.25	6	98.98
7	Byun Ji-hyun	South Korea	143.70	5	56.25	8	87.45
8	Vanna Giang	United States	135.65	10	48.14	7	87.51
9	Lucrezia Gennaro	Italy	134.18	11	47.45	9	86.73
10	Anastasia Galustyan	Armenia	133.21	7	55.89	11	77.32
11	Annika Hocke	Germany	125.20	15	41.52	10	83.68
12	Li Xiangning	China	121.24	13	46.97	13	74.27
13	Anni Järvenpää	Finland	120.91	9	48.27	15	72.64
14	Fruzsina Medgyesi	Hungary	117.61	14	43.45	14	74.16
15	Juni Marie Benjaminsen	Norway	117.16	12	47.18	16	69.98
16	Alexandra Hagarová	Slovakia	113.27	16	38.75	12	74.52

=== Pairs ===
Rank	Name	Nation	Total points	SP		FS	
1	Ekaterina Borisova / Dmitry Sopot	Russia	168.66	2	60.80	1	107.86
2	Anna Dušková / Martin Bidař	Czech Republic	166.13	1	61.82	2	104.31
3	Alina Ustimkina / Nikita Volodin	Russia	152.77	3	56.38	3	96.39
4	Justine Brasseur / Mathieu Ostiguy	Canada	140.59	4	48.51	5	92.08
5	Zhao Ying / Xie Zhong	China	139.06	6	45.84	4	93.22
6	Sarah Rose / Joseph Goodpaster	United States	126.53	5	46.47	6	80.06
7	Gao Yumeng / Li Bowen	China	119.78	7	43.96	7	75.82
8	Kim Su-yeon / Kim Hyung-tae	South Korea	108.53	8	35.86	8	72.67
9	Irma Caldara / Edoardo Caputo	Italy	100.15	9	35.49	9	64.66
10	Anastasia Pobizhenko / Dmytro Sharpar	Ukraine	74.30	10	28.16	10	46.14

=== Ice dancing ===
Rank	Name	Nation	Total points	SD		FD	
1	Anastasia Shpilevaya / Grigory Smirnov	Russia	141.88	1	57.93	1	83.95
2	Chloe Lewis / Logan Bye	United States	136.37	3	55.07	2	81.30
3	Anastasia Skoptcova / Kirill Aleshin	Russia	134.62	2	57.75	3	76.87
4	Marjorie Lajoie / Zachary Lagha	Canada	125.87	4	51.06	4	74.81
5	Anzhelika Yurchenko / Volodymyr Byelikov	Ukraine	114.96	5	48.00	5	66.96
6	Emilia Kalehanava / Uladzislau Palkhouski	Belarus	108.12	6	47.88	9	60.24
7	Maria Golubtsova / Kirill Belobrov	Ukraine	107.66	9	41.37	6	66.29
8	Julia Wagret / Mathieu Couyras	France	105.64	8	44.50	7	61.14
9	Guostė Damulevičiūtė / Deividas Kizala	Lithuania	105.52	7	44.58	8	60.94
10	Viktoria Semenjuk / Artur Gruzdev	Estonia	98.60	10	40.06	10	58.54
11	Charise Matthaei / Maximilian Pfisterer	Germany	96.40	11	39.29	12	57.11
12	Francesca Righi / Pietro Papetti	Italy	95.54	12	38.22	11	57.32

== Mixed NOC team trophy ==
=== Teams ===
The skaters who took part the team trophy was determined by draw. The result of the draw was that none of the ladies' medalists, Polina Tsurskaya, Maria Sotskova and Elizabet Tursynbayeva, took part in this segment. It was the second consecutive time this had happened. At the 2012 Winter Youth Olympics none of the ladies' medalists, Elizaveta Tuktamysheva, Adelina Sotnikova and Li Zijun, took part in the team trophy either.

Mixed NOC teams
Team name	Members	Event
Team Desire	(Russia) Dmitri Aliev (China) Li Xiangning (United States) Sarah Rose / Joseph Goodpaster (Russia) Anastasia Skoptcova / Kirill Aleshin	Men; Ladies; Pairs; Ice dancing
Team Motivation	(Malaysia) Kai Xiang Chew (South Korea) Byun Ji-hyun (Russia) Ekaterina Borisova / Dmitry Sopot (Lithuania) Guostė Damulevičiūtė / Deividas Kizala	Men; Ladies; Pairs; Ice dancing
Team Future	(Ukraine) Ivan Shmuratko (Latvia) Diāna Ņikitina (Czech Republic) Anna Dušková / Martin Bidař (France) Julia Wagret / Mathieu Couyras	Men; Ladies; Pairs; Ice dancing
Team Discovery	(Latvia) Deniss Vasiļjevs (Hungary) Fruzsina Medgyesi (China) Gao Yumeng / Li Bowen (Canada) Marjorie Lajoie / Zachary Lagha	Men; Ladies; Pairs; Ice dancing
Team Determination	(France) Adam Siao Him Fa (Japan) ~~Kaori Sakamoto~~ (Germany) Annika Hocke (Russia) Alina Ustimkina / Nikita Volodin (Italy) Francesca Righi / Pietro Papetti	Men; Ladies; Pairs; Ice dancing
Team Focus	(Finland) Lauri Lankila (Japan) Yuna Shiraiwa (China) Zhao Ying / Xie Zhong (Ukraine) Maria Golubtsova / Kirill Belobrov	Men; Ladies; Pairs; Ice dancing
Team Courage	(Canada) ~~Roman Sadovsky~~ (South Korea) Cha Jun-hwan (Norway) ~~Juni Marie Benjaminsen~~ (Slovakia) Alexandra Hagarová (Italy) Irma Caldara / Edoardo Caputo (Russia) Anastasia Shpilevaya / Grigory Smirnov	Men; Ladies; Pairs; Ice dancing
Team Hope	(Italy) Adrien Bannister (Armenia) ~~Anastasia Galustyan~~ (Italy) Lucrezia Gennaro (South Korea) Kim Su-yeon / Kim Hyung-tae (Belarus) Emilia Kalehanava / Uladzislau Palkhouski	Men; Ladies; Pairs; Ice dancing

=== Results ===
Mixed NOC team results
Rank	Team name	Men	Ladies	Pairs	Ice Dancing	Total points
1	Team Desire	7	5	4	7	23
2	Team Future	3	7	7	3	20
3	Team Discovery	8	1	3	6	18
4	Team Motivation	2	6	8	2	18
5	Team Focus	1	8	5	4	18
6	Team Courage	6	2	1	8	17
7	Team Hope	5	4	2	5	16
8	Team Determination	4	3	6	1	14

=== Detailed results ===
==== Men ====
Rank	Name	Nation	FS	Points	Team name
1	Deniss Vasiļjevs	Latvia	149.09	8	Team Discovery
2	Dmitri Aliev	Russia	141.06	7	Team Desire
3	Cha Jun-hwan	South Korea	139.97	6	Team Courage
4	Adrien Bannister	Italy	119.28	5	Team Hope
5	Adam Siao Him Fa	France	97.80	4	Team Determination
6	Ivan Shmuratko	Ukraine	89.66	3	Team Future
7	Kai Xiang Chew	Malaysia	86.56	2	Team Motivation
8	Lauri Lankila	Finland	61.57	1	Team Focus

==== Ladies ====
Rank	Name	Nation	FS	Points	Team name
1	Yuna Shiraiwa	Japan	110.01	8	Team Focus
2	Diāna Ņikitina	Latvia	107.47	7	Team Future
3	Byun Ji-hyun	South Korea	99.94	6	Team Motivation
4	Li Xiangning	China	88.73	5	Team Desire
5	Lucrezia Gennaro	Italy	83.64	4	Team Hope
6	Annika Hocke	Germany	82.41	3	Team Determination
7	Alexandra Hagarová	Slovakia	75.55	2	Team Courage
8	Fruzsina Medgyesi	Hungary	71.26	1	Team Discovery

==== Pairs ====
Rank	Name	Nation	FS	Points	Team name
1	Ekaterina Borisova / Dmitry Sopot	Russia	104.80	8	Team Motivation
2	Anna Dušková / Martin Bidař	Czech Republic	103.91	7	Team Future
3	Alina Ustimkina / Nikita Volodin	Russia	100.98	6	Team Determination
4	Zhao Ying / Xie Zhong	China	92.74	5	Team Focus
5	Sarah Rose / Joseph Goodpaster	United States	82.47	4	Team Desire
6	Gao Yumeng / Li Bowen	China	74.45	3	Team Discovery
7	Kim Su-yeon / Kim Hyung-tae	South Korea	70.50	2	Team Hope
8	Irma Caldara / Edoardo Caputo	Italy	68.81	1	Team Courage

==== Ice dancing ====
Rank	Name	Nation	FD	Points	Team name
1	Anastasia Shpilevaya / Grigory Smirnov	Russia	86.48	8	Team Courage
2	Anastasia Skoptcova / Kirill Aleshin	Russia	80.28	7	Team Desire
3	Marjorie Lajoie / Zachary Lagha	Canada	73.78	6	Team Discovery
4	Emilia Kalehanava / Uladzislau Palkhouski	Belarus	65.42	5	Team Hope
5	Maria Golubtsova / Kirill Belobrov	Ukraine	64.68	4	Team Focus
6	Julia Wagret / Mathieu Couyras	France	63.06	3	Team Future
7	Guostė Damulevičiūtė / Deividas Kizala	Lithuania	55.56	2	Team Motivation
8	Francesca Righi / Pietro Papetti	Italy	53.70	1	Team Determination
