= Alina Ustimkina =

Russian pair skater

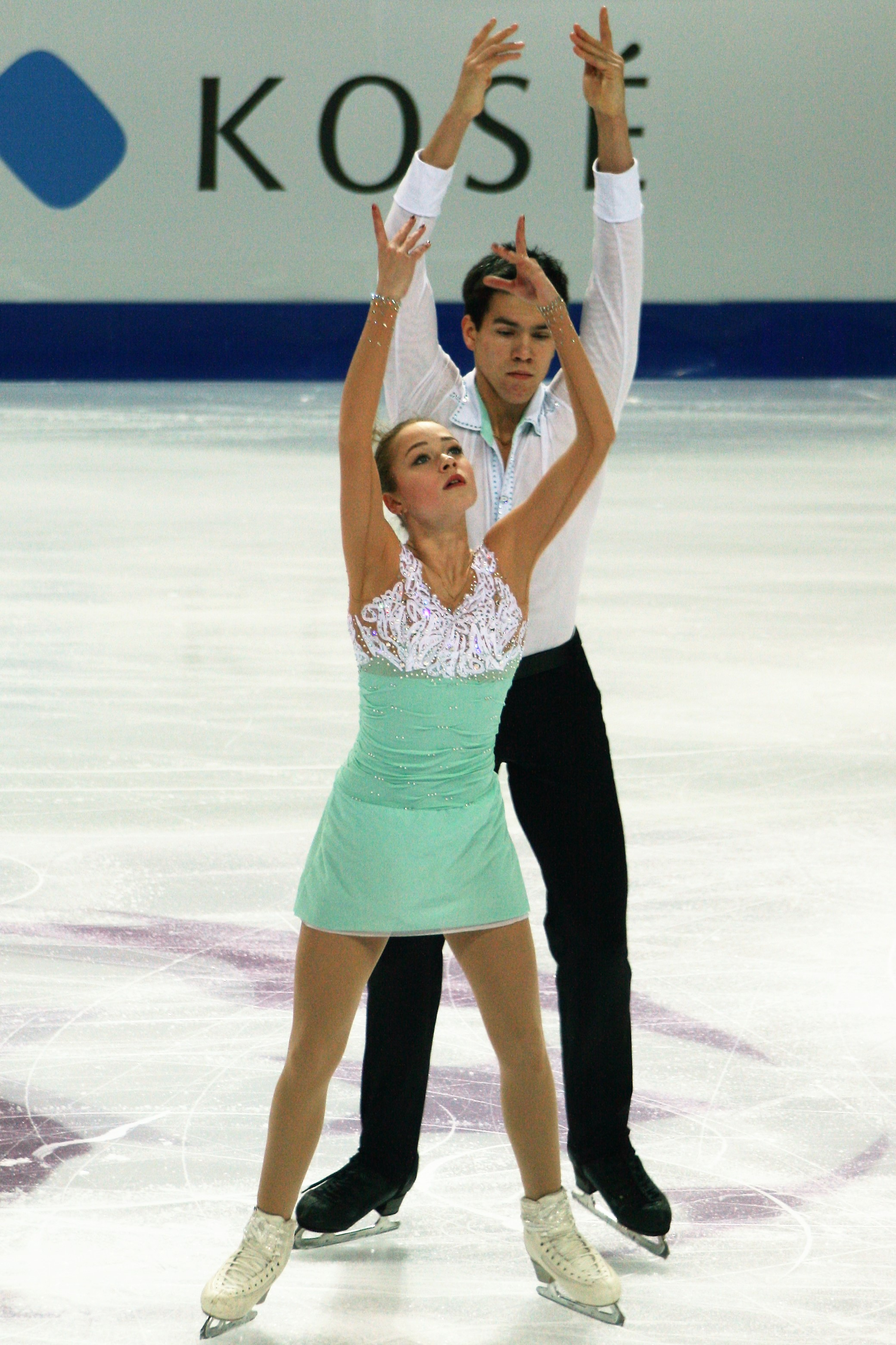
- Ustimkina and Nikita Volodin at the 2016-17 ISU Junior Grand Prix Final

Personal information
- Native name: Алина Владимировна Устимкина
- Full name: Alina Vladimirovna Ustimkina
- Born: 2 September 2000 (age 26) Nizhny Novgorod, Russia
- Height: 1.62 m (5 ft 4 in)

Figure skating career
- Country: Russia
- Partner: Alexey Rogonov
- Coach: Alexei Sokolov
- Skating club: Olympic School St. Petersburg
- Began skating: 2006
Medal record
Representing Russia
Figure skating: Pairs
Winter Youth Olympics
| Bronze medal – third place | 2016 Lillehammer | Pairs |

Alina Vladimirovna Ustimkina (Russian: Алина Владимировна Устимкина, born 2 September 2000) is a Russian pair skater. With her former partner, Nikita Volodin, she is the 2016 CS Tallinn Trophy champion and 2016 Youth Olympic bronze medalist.

== Personal life ==
Alina Vladimirovna Ustimkina was born on 2 September 2000 in Nizhny Novgorod, Russia. On 9 July 2020 she married a Russian pair skater Nodari Maisuradze.

== Career ==
=== Early years ===
Ustimkina began skating in 2006. She trained in Nizhny Novgorod until 2011 and then moved to Saint Petersburg, where she competed in singles until November 2013. Her first pairs partner was Maxim Bobrov. In April 2014, they placed fifth at the Russia Junior Championships – Elder Age.

=== Partnership with Volodin ===
Ustimkina and Nikita Volodin debuted their partnership in September 2014. They competed at events within Russia during their first season together and began appearing internationally in the 2015–16 season. In August 2015, they were sent to Riga, Latvia to compete at their first ISU Junior Grand Prix (JGP) assignment, placing fifth. In November, they won the junior gold medal at the NRW Trophy, outscoring silver medalists Anna Dušková / Martin Bidař by 19.22 points.

In January 2016, Ustimkina/Volodin placed fifth at the Russian Junior Championships. In February, they represented Russia at the 2016 Winter Youth Olympics in Hamar, Norway. Ranked third in both segments, they were awarded the bronze medal behind Ekaterina Borisova / Dmitry Sopot and Dušková/Bidař. Assigned to Team Determination for the mixed NOC team event, Ustimkina/Volodin placed third in their segment and their team finished 8th.

Ustimkina and Volodin ended their partnership in late 2017.

=== Later career ===
In August 2018, Ustimkina began skating with Alexei Rogonov.

== Programs ==
(with Volodin)

| Season | Short program | Free skating |
|---|---|---|
| 2017–2018 | Vertigogo by Combustible Edison | Aria by Balanescu Quartet |
| 2016–2017 | Mad Max: Fury Road by Junkie XL | Aria by Balanescu Quartet |
| 2015–2016 | Code Name Vivaldi by The Piano Guys | Dance For Me, Wallis (from W.E.) by Abel Korzeniowski |

== Competitive highlights ==
CS: Challenger Series; JGP: Junior Grand Prix

=== With Volodin ===
International
| Event | 14–15 | 15–16 | 16–17 | 17–18 |
|---|---|---|---|---|
| CS Ice Star | | | | 5th |
| CS Tallinn Trophy | | | 1st | |
International: Junior
| Junior Worlds | | | 6th | |
| Youth Olympics | | 3rd | | |
| JGP Final | | | 4th | |
| JGP Estonia | | | 2nd | |
| JGP Germany | | | 3rd | |
| JGP Latvia | | 5th | | |
| NRW Trophy | | 1st J | | |
National
| Russian Champ. | | | WD | |
| Russian Junior Champ. | | 5th | 3rd | |
| Russian Youth Champ. Elder Age | 7th | | | |
Team events
| Youth Olympics | | 8th T 3rd P | | |
J = Junior level T = Team result; P = Personal result; Medals awarded for team result only.

=== With Bobrov ===
National
| Event | 2013–14 |
|---|---|
| Russian Youth Champ. – Elder Age | 5th |

=== Single skating ===
International
| Event | 2012–13 |
|---|---|
| Tallinn Trophy | 7th J |
J = Junior level

== Detailed results ==
With Volodin

2017–18 season
| Date | Event | Level | SP | FS | Total |
| 26–29 October 2017 | 2017 CS Minsk-Arena Ice Star | Senior | 5; 50.26 | 5; 86.70 | 5; 136.96 |
2016–17 season
| Date | Event | Level | SP | FS | Total |
| 15–19 March 2017 | 2017 World Junior Championships | Junior | 4; 54.63 | 6; 91.06 | 6; 145.69 |
| 1–5 February 2017 | 2017 Russian Junior Championships | Junior | 5; 61.73 | 2; 110.83 | 3; 172.56 |
| 20–26 December 2016 | 2017 Russian Championships | Senior | 10; 55.35 | WD | WD |
| 8–11 December 2016 | 2016−17 JGP Final | Junior | 3; 59.05 | 4; 99.09 | 4; 158.14 |
| 20–27 November 2016 | 2016 CS Tallinn Trophy | Senior | 1; 65.64 | 2; 102.14 | 1; 167.78 |
| 5–9 October 2016 | 2016 JGP Germany | Junior | 2; 59.34 | 4; 95.92 | 3; 155.26 |
| 28 September – 2 October 2016 | 2016 JGP Estonia | Junior | 2; 57.31 | 2; 99.64 | 2; 156.95 |
2015–16 season
| Date | Event | Level | SP | FS | Total |
| 12–21 February 2016 | 2016 Winter Youth Olympics - Team Event | Junior | - | 3; 100.98 | 8 |
| 12–21 February 2016 | 2016 Winter Youth Olympics | Junior | 3; 56.38 | 3; 96.39 | 3; 152.77 |
| 19–23 January 2016 | 2016 Russian Junior Championships | Junior | 9; 51.24 | 4; 104.27 | 5; 155.51 |
| 24–29 November 2015 | 2015 NRW Trophy | Junior | 2; 49.64 | 1; 93.10 | 1; 142.74 |
| 26–30 August 2015 | 2015 JGP Latvia | Junior | 4; 46.78 | 6; 75.33 | 5; 122.11 |
