= Polina Tsurskaya =

Russian former figure skater and coach

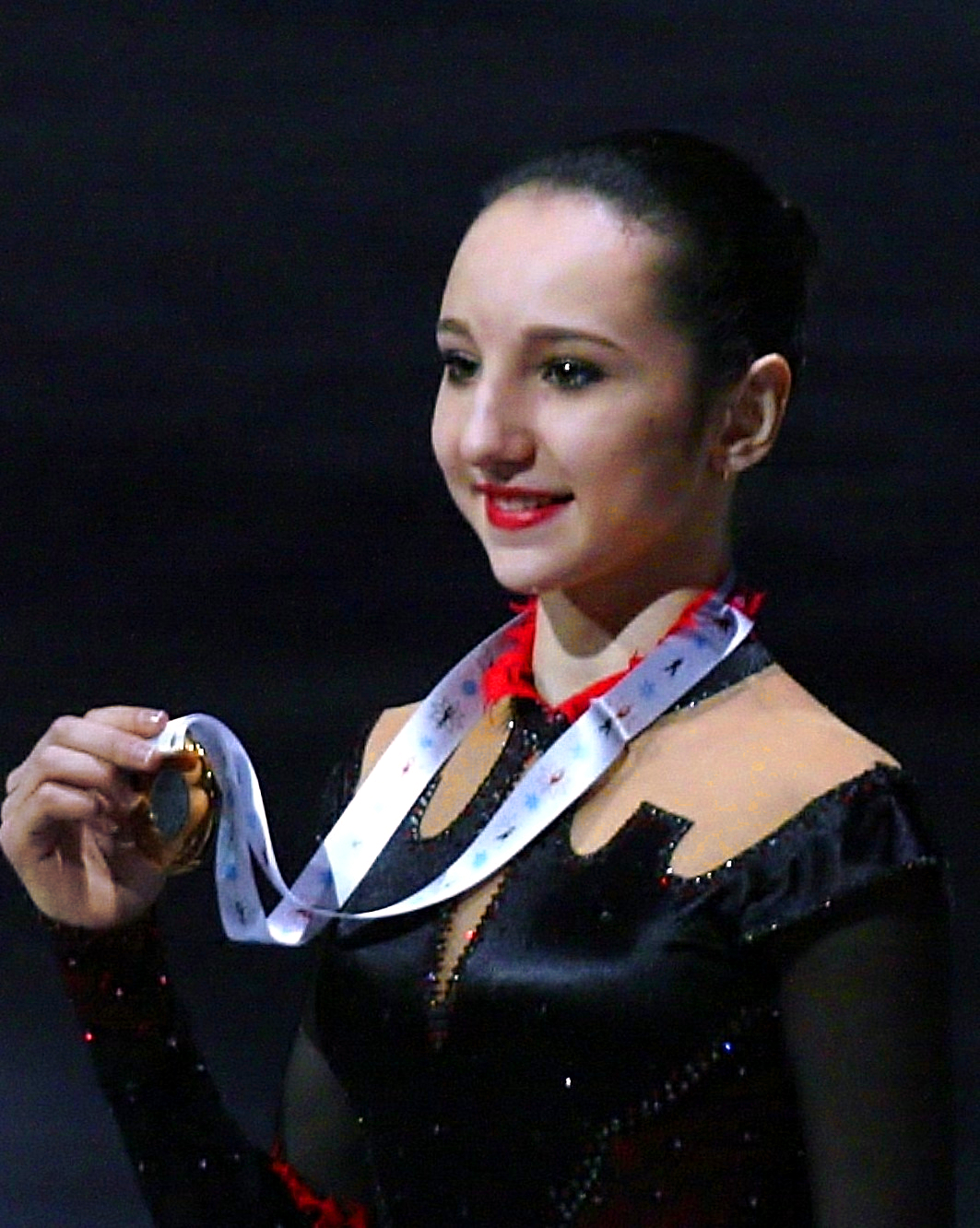
- Tsurskaya at the 2015–16 JGP Final

Personal information
- Native name: Полина Игоревна Цурская (Russian)
- Full name: Polina Igorevna Tsurskaya
- Born: 11 July 2001 (age 25) Omsk, Russia
- Height: 171 cm (5 ft 7 1/2 in)

Figure skating career
- Country: Russia
- Began skating: 2005
- Retired: May 31, 2019
Medal record
Representing Russia
Figure skating: Ladies' singles
Winter Youth Olympics
Gold medal – first place	2016 Lillehammer	Ladies's singles
Junior Grand Prix Final
Gold medal – first place	2015–16 Barcelona	Ladies' singles

Polina Igorevna Tsurskaya (pronounced TSOO-rskaya; Russian: Полина Игоревна Цурская, born 11 July 2001) is a retired competitive Russian figure skater and figure skating coach. She is the 2017 NHK Trophy bronze medallist.

On the junior level, she is the 2016 Winter Youth Olympic champion, the 2015 Junior Grand Prix Final champion, a four-time Junior Grand Prix event champion, and the 2015 Russian junior national champion.

== Personal life ==
Polina Igorevna Tsurskaya was born on July 11, 2001, in Omsk, Russia. She has an elder brother, Igor, who is nine years her senior. She moved to Moscow in 2013.

== Career ==
=== Early years ===
Tsurskaya began skating in 2005. Coached by Tatiana Odinokova in Omsk until 2013, she joined Eteri Tutberidze and Sergei Dudakov after relocating to Moscow. Fifth in her first appearance at the Russian Junior Championships, in 2014, she finished fourth in 2015.

=== 2015−2016 season ===
Tsurskaya made her international debut in August 2015 at the Junior Grand Prix (JGP) in Bratislava, Slovakia. She was awarded the gold medal after placing first in both segments and finishing 10 points ahead of the silver medalist, Mai Mihara. Outscoring Ekaterina Mitrofanova by 21 points, she won her next JGP assignment, in Toruń, Poland, and qualified for the final. At the 2015–16 JGP Final, held on December in Barcelona, she won the gold medal with personal best scores in both segments and a total of 195.28 points. She broke the junior records in the free skate and total scores set by compatriot Elena Radionova. Competing on the senior level, Tsurskaya finished fourth later in December at the Russian Championships before winning her first junior national title in January.

Tsurskaya at the 2015 Grand Prix Final

In February, Tsurskaya won gold at the 2016 Winter Youth Olympics in Lillehammer, Norway. In March, she was scheduled to compete at the 2016 World Junior Championships in Debrecen but withdrew before the start of the event. An ankle injury had occurred a day before she departed for the event and was aggravated when she fell in Hungary during the morning practice before the short program. After three months during which she had to avoid running and jumping, she resumed training in early June.

=== 2016–2017 season ===
In September 2016, Tsurskaya won gold at two JGP series events; she ranked first in the short program and second in the free in Saransk, Russia, and first in both segments in Tallinn, Estonia. She was the second-ranked qualifier to the JGP Final in Marseille, but withdrew on 29 November. She underwent surgery on her right knee and resumed practicing jumps in mid-December.

Tsurskaya finished tenth at the 2017 World Junior Championships in Taipei, Taiwan. During the season, she was diagnosed with osteochondritis dissecans and a herniated disc.

Tsurskaya at the 2018 Skate America

=== 2017–2018 season ===
Making her senior international debut, Tsurskaya won the bronze medal at the 2017 NHK Trophy, setting personal best scores in both segments. In November, Tsurskaya finished fourth at 2017 Skate America, placing eighth in the short program and fourth in the long program and scoring 195.56 points total.

On May 7, 2018, it was announced Tsurskaya was ending her partnership with coach Eteri Tutberidze.

=== 2018–2019 season ===
Tsurskaya began her season by competing at the 2018 CS Ondrej Nepela Trophy where she placed fourth. In her Grand Prix events, she placed seventh at the 2018 Skate America and eighth at the 2018 Rostelecom Cup. She placed fourteenth at the 2019 Russian Championships. Tsurskaya announced her retirement from figure skating on May 31, 2019.

== Coaching ==
In summer 2020 Polina started working as a figure skating coach in the skating club Sambo-70, Chrustalnyi department, in a cooperation with the team of her former coach Eteri Tutberidze. She mainly works with children. She is also coach of Olympian Mariia Seniuk.

== Achievements ==
- Set the junior-level ladies' record for the free program to 128.59 points at the 2015–16 Junior Grand Prix Final, previously held by Elena Radionova. Record was broken by Marin Honda at the 2016 JGP Japan.
- Set the junior-level ladies' record for the combined total to 195.28 points at the 2015–16 Junior Grand Prix Final, previously held by Elena Radionova. Record was broken by Alina Zagitova at the 2016–17 Junior Grand Prix Final.
- Set the junior-level ladies' record for the short program to 69.02 points at the 2016 JGP Russia, previously held by Evgenia Medvedeva. Record was broken by Alina Zagitova at the 2016–17 Junior Grand Prix Final.

== Programs ==
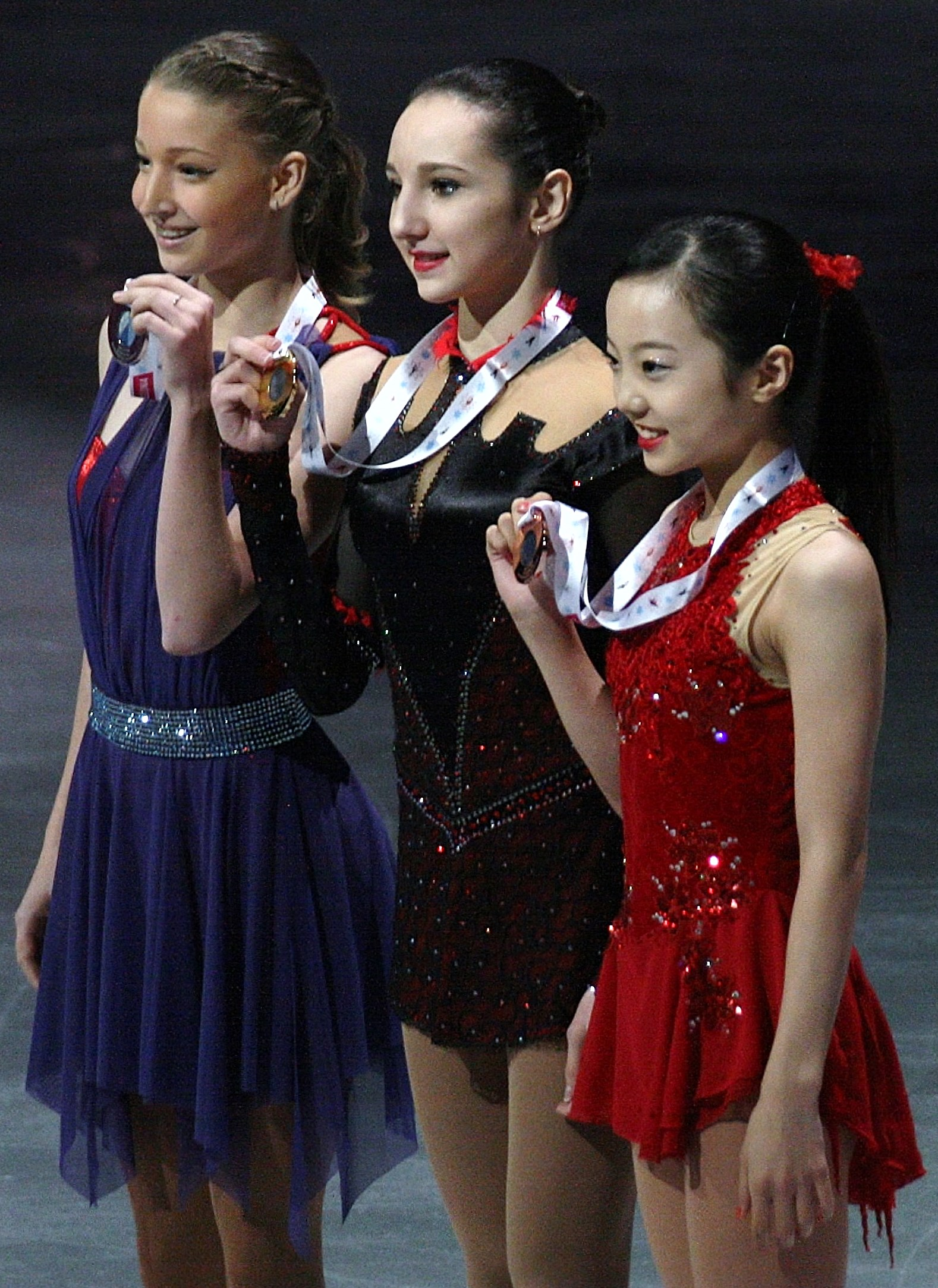
Tsurskaya at the 2015–16 Junior Grand Prix Final podium

Season	Short program	Free skating	Exhibition
2018–2019	And the Waltz Goes On by Anthony Hopkins performed by André Rieu choreo. by Nikita Mikhailov, Tatiana Tarasova	Leningrad by William Joseph; Prodigy by Kōtarō Nakagawa; Live Or Die by X-Ray Dog choreo. by Nikita Mikhailov, Tatiana Tarasova	The Best performed by Tina Turner
2017–2018	Light of the Seven (from Game of Thrones) by Ramin Djawadi choreo. by Daniil Gleikhengauz	Nocturne in F Minor Op. 55, No. 1 by Frédéric Chopin arr. by Chad Lawson for piano; Stillness of the Mind (from A Single Man soundtrack) by Abel Korzeniowski; Song for the Little Sparrow performed by Patricia Kaas	The Great Gatsby: Gatsby Believed in the Green Light by Tobey Maguire, Craig Armstrong; Kill and Run by Sia, Chris Braide
2016–2017	Light of the Seven (from Game of Thrones) by Ramin Djawadi choreo. by Daniil Gleikhengauz	February by Leonid Levashkevich choreo. by Eteri Tutberidze	
2015–2016	Adagio in G minor by Remo Giazotto, Tomaso Albinoni performed by Ikuko Kawai choreo. by Daniil Gleikhengauz	Chess by Benny Andersson, Björn Ulvaeus choreo. by Eteri Tutberidze	The Witch Hunters (from Hansel & Gretel: Witch Hunters) by Atli Örvarsson; I Put a Spell on You performed by Annie Lennox; Adagio in G minor by Remo Giazotto, Tomaso Albinoni performed by Ikuko Kawai choreo. by Daniil Gleikhengauz
2014–2015	Carmenita Lounging by Claude Challe; In the Hall of the Mountain King (from Peer Gynt) by Edvard Grieg choreo. by Eteri Tutberidze	Chess by Benny Andersson, Björn Ulvaeus choreo. by Eteri Tutberidze	
2013–2014	Between The Beats by Jeroen van Veen	Scene d'Amour by Francis Lai performed by Sarah Brightman	

== Competitive highlights ==
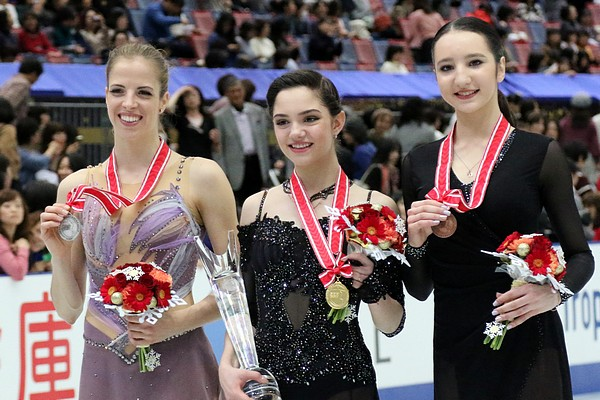
Tsurskaya (right) with Evgenia Medvedeva (center) and Carolina Kostner (left) at the 2017 NHK Trophy podium.

GP: Grand Prix; CS: Challenger Series; JGP: Junior Grand Prix

International
Event	13–14	14–15	15–16	16–17	17–18	18–19
GP NHK Trophy					3rd	
GP Rostelecom						8th
GP Skate America					4th	7th
CS Ondrej Nepela						4th
International: Junior
Junior Worlds			WD	10th		
Youth Olympics			1st			
JGP Final			1st	WD		
JGP Estonia				1st		
JGP Poland			1st			
JGP Russia				1st		
JGP Slovakia			1st			
National
Russia			4th	WD	5th	14th
Russia: Junior	5th	4th	1st	3rd		
TBD = Assigned; WD = Withdrew

== Detailed results ==
=== Senior level ===
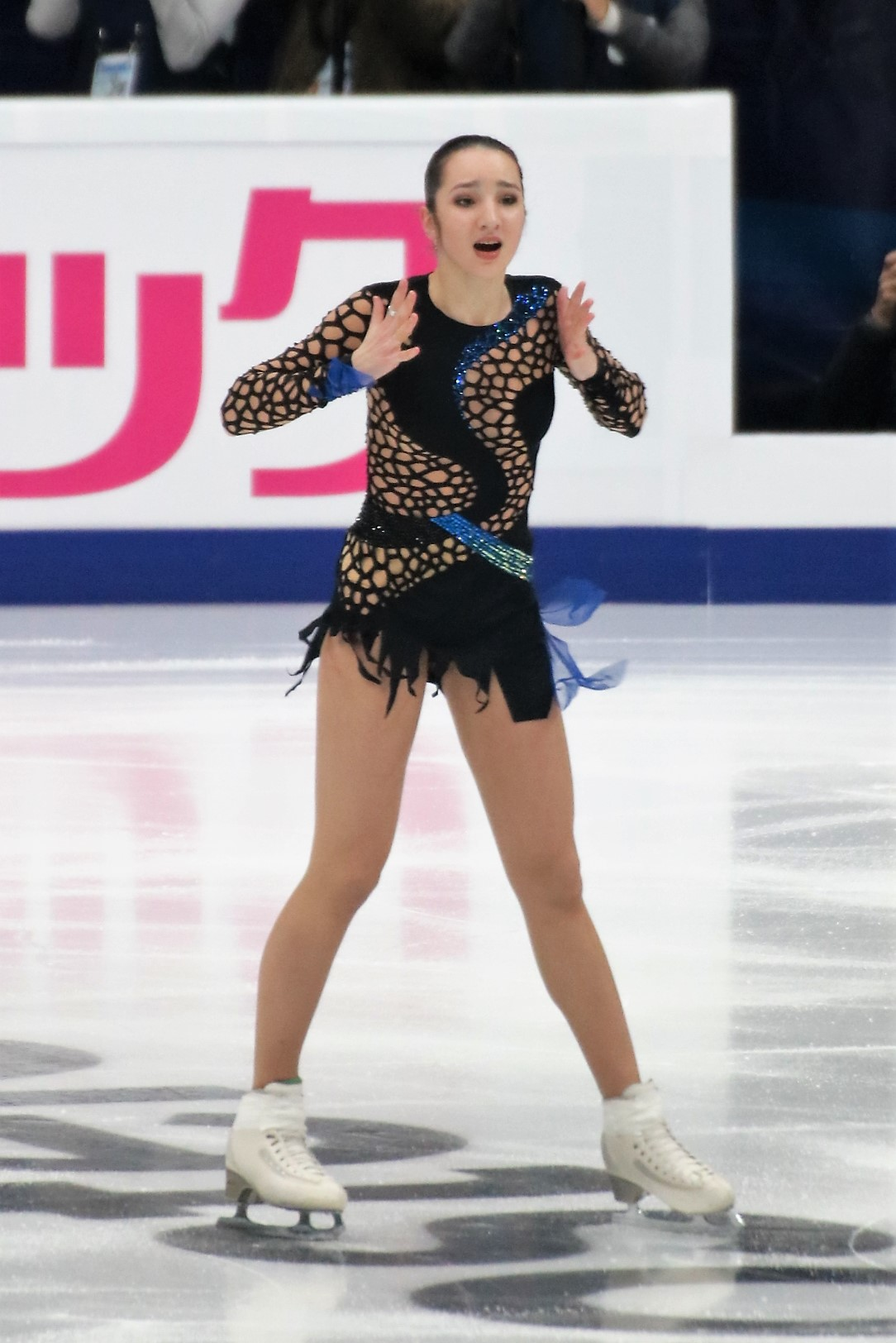
Tsurskaya at the 2018 Rostelecom Cup.

**2018–19 season**
Date	Event	SP	FS	Total
19–23 December 2018	2019 Russian Championships	11; 66.35	15; 118.97	14; 185.32
16–18 November 2018	2018 Rostelecom Cup	7; 56.81	8; 92.64	8; 149.45
19–21 October 2018	2018 Skate America	8; 58.42	8; 101.03	7; 159.45
19–22 September 2018	2018 CS Ondrej Nepela Trophy	4; 54.36	5; 100.25	4; 154.61
**2017–18 season**
Date	Event	SP	FS	Total
21–24 December 2017	2018 Russian Championships	3; 75.33	6; 132.28	5; 207.61
24–26 November 2017	2017 Skate America	8; 63.20	4; 132.36	4; 195.56
10–12 November 2017	2017 NHK Trophy	3; **70.04**	2; **140.15**	3; **210.19**

=== Junior level ===
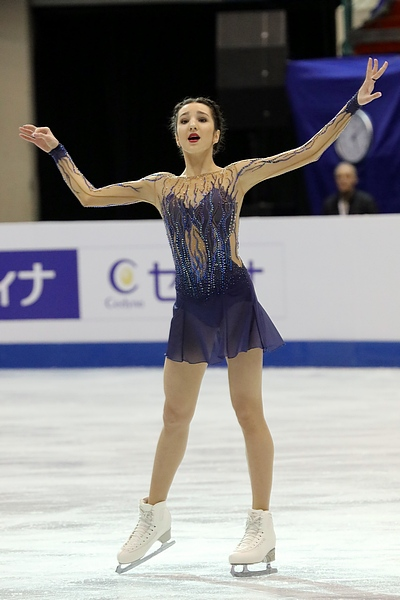
Tsurskaya at the 2017 World Junior Championships

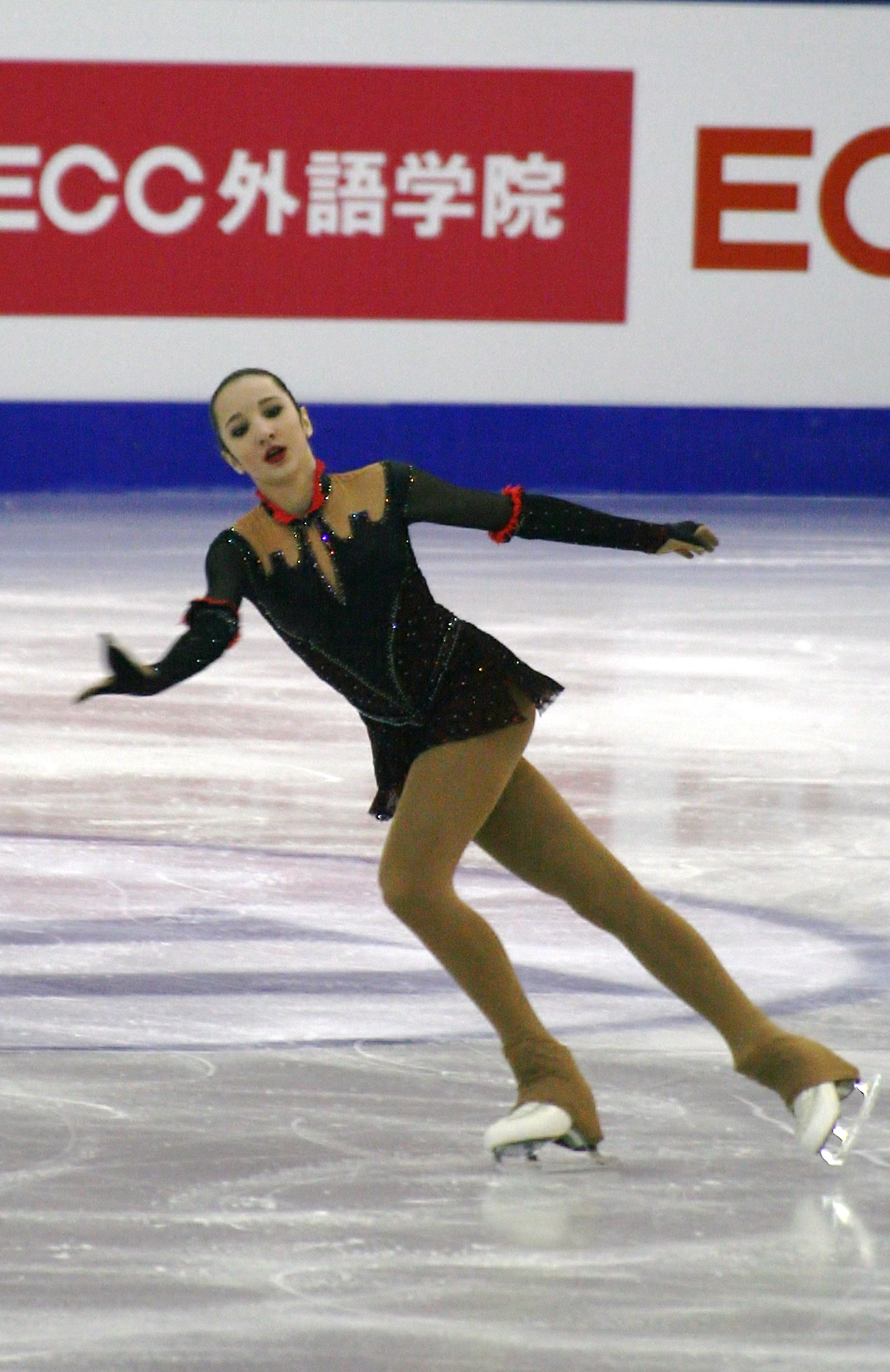
Tsurskaya at the 2015–16 Junior Grand Prix Final

Previous ISU Junior world records highlighted in bold.

**2016–17 season**
Date	Event	Level	SP	FS	Total
15–19 March 2017	2017 World Junior Championships	Junior	11; 54.30	9; 101.61	10; 155.91
1–5 February 2017	2017 Russian Junior Championships	Junior	5; 65.79	2; 134.29	3; 200.08
28 Sept. – 1 Oct. 2016	2016 JGP Estonia	Junior	1; 66.72	1; 127.30	1; 194.02
14–18 September 2016	2016 JGP Russia	Junior	1; **69.02**	2; 114.71	1; 183.73
**2015–16 season**
Date	Event	Level	SP	FS	Total
14–20 March 2016	2016 World Junior Championships	Junior	-	-	WD
12–21 February 2016	2016 Winter Youth Olympics	Junior	4; 58.65	1; 127.39	1; 186.04
19–23 January 2016	2016 Russian Junior Championships	Junior	1; 73.51	1; 136.53	1; 210.04
24–27 December 2015	2016 Russian Championships	Senior	5; 70.53	5; 134.93	4; 205.46
10–13 December 2015	2015−16 JGP Final	Junior	1; 66.69	1; **128.59**	1; **195.28**
23–26 September 2015	2015 JGP Poland	Junior	1; 61.04	1; 126.81	1; 187.85
19–23 August 2015	2015 JGP Slovakia	Junior	1; 66.08	1; 123.42	1; 189.50
**2014–15 season**
Date	Event	Level	SP	FS	Total
4–7 February 2015	2015 Russian Junior Championships	Junior	3; 64.07	4; 118.76	4; 182.83
**2013–14 season**
Date	Event	Level	SP	FS	Total
23–25 January 2014	2014 Russian Junior Championships	Junior	3; 63.58	6; 116.02	5; 179.60

Historical World Junior Record Holders (before season 2018–19)
Preceded by (Russia) Evgenia Medvedeva	Ladies' Junior Short Program; 16 September 2016 – 10 December 2016	Succeeded by (Russia) Alina Zagitova
Preceded by (Russia) Elena Radionova	Ladies' Junior Free Skating; 13 December 2015 – 11 September 2016	Succeeded by (Japan) Marin Honda
Preceded by (Russia) Elena Radionova	Ladies' Junior Total Score; 13 December 2015 – 11 December 2016	Succeeded by (Russia) Alina Zagitova
