= Joseph Johnson (figure skater) =

American former competitive ice dancer (born 1994)

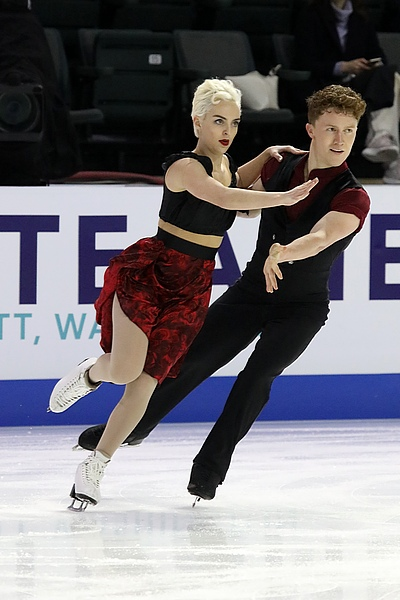
- Manta and Johnson in 2018

Personal information
- Born: May 5, 1994 (age 32) Rockford, Illinois, U.S.
- Home town: Colorado Springs, Colorado, U.S.
- Height: 5 ft 8 in (1.72 m)

Figure skating career
- Country: United States
- Discipline: Ice dance
- Began skating: 2003
- Retired: April 18, 2019

Joseph "Joe" Johnson (born May 5, 1994) is an American former competitive ice dancer.

== Early life ==
Johnson was born on May 5, 1994. He began skating in 2003.

== Career ==
Since 2013, he has competed with Karina Manta in ice dance. Before he partnered with Manta, Johnson had competed with Tori Patsis and Paolina Bushur. Manta and Johnson are coached by Patti Gottwein in Colorado Springs. The team received their first Grand Prix assignment in 2018, competing at Skate America. They finished in 10th place with a total score of 139.33.

Johnson announced his retirement from competitive figure skating on April 18, 2019.

In 2021 he joined ITV’s show Dancing on Ice series 13 as a professional skater. He was paired up with the gymnastic medalist Amy Tinkler in his first series and Love Island star Liberty Poole in his second series.

== Programs ==
Season	Short program	Free skating
2018–2019	Malagueña by Ernesto Lecuona; Alcoba Azul by Elliot Goldenthal choreo. by Trina Pratt, Ben Agosto	Sweet Dreams by Eurythmics performed by Emily Browning; Sweet Dreams (are Made of This) by Eurythmics performed by Dave Stewart & His Fabulous Orchestra choreo. by Christopher Dean
2017–2018	Right Now by Pussycat Dolls; Fireball by Pitbull	Your Song; One Day I'll Fly Away by Elton John, Tony Phillips performed by Ewan McGregor, Nicole Kidman
2016–2017	Dream a Little Dream; I Wanna Be Like You by Robbie Williams	Dream On by Aerosmith
2015–2016	March: The Love for Three Oranges; Waltz: Cinderella by Sergei Prokofiev	Maple Leaf Rag; Bethana; The Entertainer by Scott Joplin

== Competitive Highlights ==
GP: Grand Prix; CS: Challenger Series

(with Karina Manta)

International
Event	14–15	15–16	16–17	17–18	18–19
GP Skate America					10th
CS Autumn Classic		3rd			
CS Nebelhorn				14th	
CS US Classic			5th		5th
Lake Placid IDI			6th	5th	
National
U.S. Champ.	10th J	7th	8th	9th	7th
