= Gao Yumeng =

Chinese pair skater

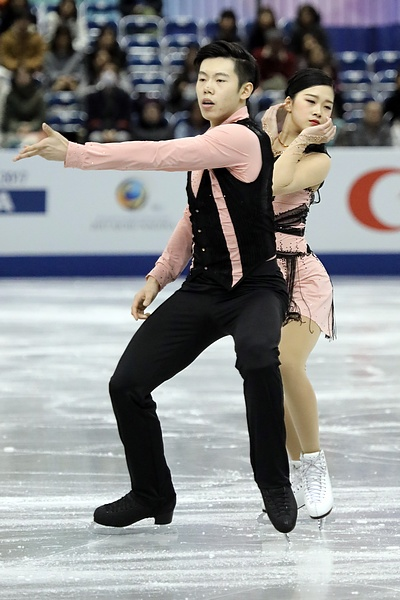

Personal information
- Born: April 13, 2001 (age 25) Tianjin, China
- Height: 1.58 m (5 ft 2 in)

Figure skating career
- Country: China
- Partner: Xie Zhong
- Coach: Zhao Hongbo
- Skating club: China Youth Team
- Began skating: 2008
Medal record
Figure skating: Pairs
Representing China (with Xie Zhong)
World Junior Championships
Bronze medal – third place	2017 Taipei	Pairs
Representing Mixed-NOCs (with Li Bowen)
Winter Youth Olympics
Bronze medal – third place	2016 Lillehammer	Team

Gao Yumeng (Chinese: 高誉萌; born April 13, 2001) is a Chinese pair skater. With her skating partner, Xie Zhong, she is the 2017 World Junior bronze medalist and 2017 Chinese national bronze medalist on the senior level.

== Early career ==
Gao began learning to skate in 2008. During the 2015–2016 season, she competed in partnership with Li Bowen. Competing on the senior level, they finished 5th at the 2016 Chinese Championships. They placed 7th at the 2016 Winter Youth Olympics, held in February in Hamar, Norway, and 13th at the 2016 World Junior Championships, held in March in Debrecen, Hungary. The pair was coached by Luan Bo, Song Lun, and Li Yinwei in Harbin, China.

== Partnership with Xie ==
Gao and Xie Zhong are coached by Zhao Hongbo in Beijing.

=== 2016–2017 season ===
Making their international debut as a pair, they placed 5th at a Junior Grand Prix (JGP) event in early September 2016 in Ostrava, Czech Republic. They had the same result at their second JGP assignment, in Saransk, Russia. In December, they won the bronze medal competing as seniors at the Chinese Championships.

In March 2017, Gao/Xie won the bronze medal at the World Junior Championships in Taipei, having ranked second in the short program and third in the free skate.

=== 2017–2018 season ===
Gao/Xie placed 4th at JGP Poland and 2nd at JGP Croatia, qualifying for the Junior Grand Prix Final (JGPF). They finished 4th at both JGPF and World Junior Championships. They split at the end of this season.

== Programs ==
=== With Xie ===
Season	Short program	Free skating
2017–2018	Chicago (soundtrack) (from Chicago)	Turning Page from The Twilight Saga: Breaking Dawn – Part 1 (soundtrack)
2016–2017	Cavatina (from The Deer Hunter) by Stanley Myers	Crunchy Granola Suite by Neil Diamond

=== With Li ===
Season	Short program	Free skating
2015–2016	Happy Paradise	Tarantella by Ludovico Einaudi

== Competitive highlights ==
GP: Grand Prix; JGP: Junior Grand Prix

=== With Xie ===
International
Event	2016–17	2017–18
Junior Worlds	3rd	4th
JGP Final		4th
JGP Czech Rep.	5th	
JGP Russia	5th	
JGP Croatia		2nd
JGP Poland		4th
National
Chinese Champ.	3rd	

=== With Li ===
International
Event	2015–16
Junior Worlds	13th
Youth Olympics	7th
National
Chinese Champ.	5th
Team events
Youth Olympics	3rd T 6th P
T = Team result; P = Personal result Medals awarded for team result only.
