= Justine Brasseur =

Canadian pair skater

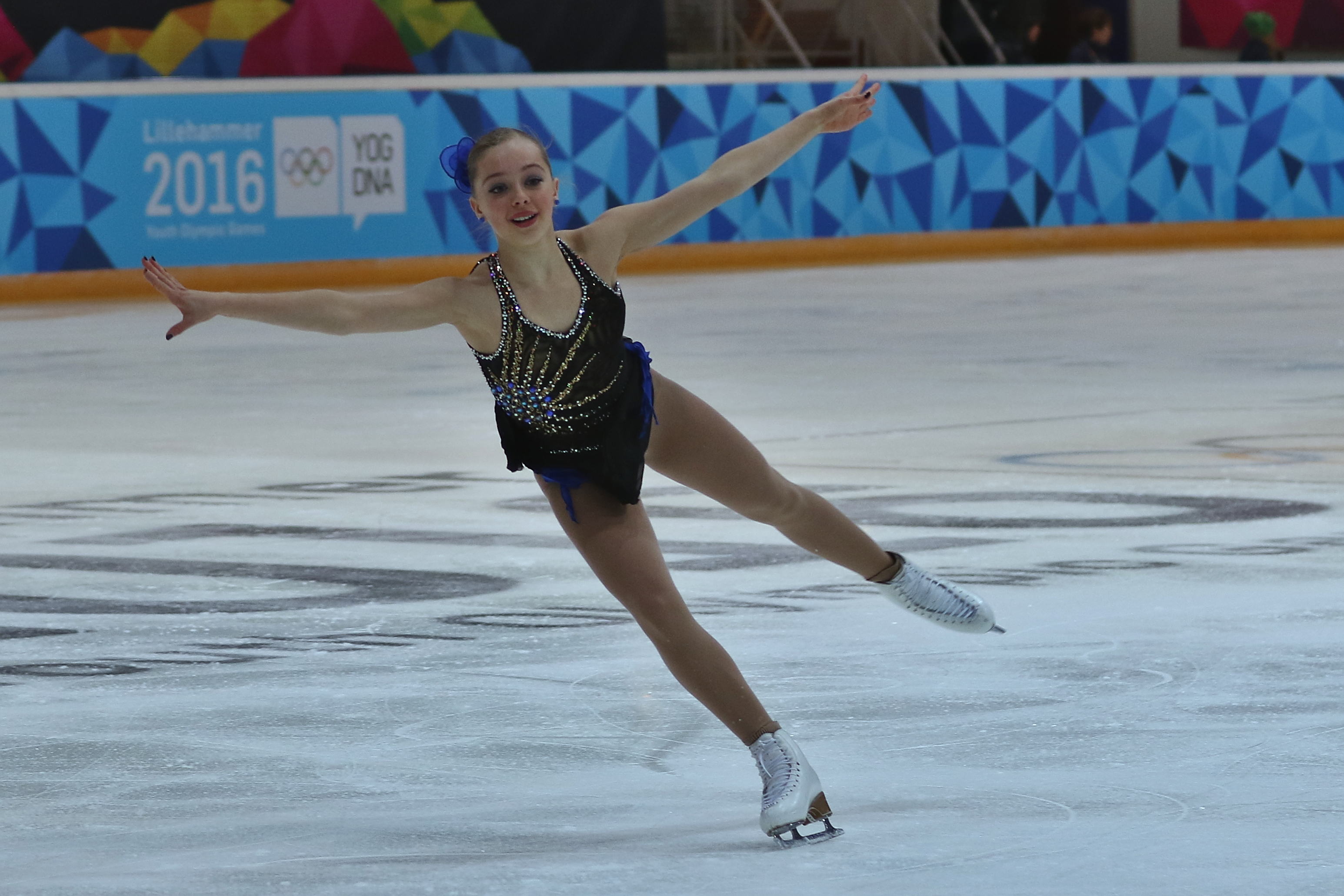
- Brasseur at the 2016 Youth Olympics

Personal information
- Born: July 10, 2001 (age 25) LaSalle, Quebec, Canada
- Home town: Brossard, Quebec
- Height: 1.56 m (5 ft 1 1/2 in)

Figure skating career
- Country: Canada
- Coach: Bruno Marcotte, Meagan Duhamel
- Skating club: Brossard FSC
- Began skating: 2003
- Retired: January 22, 2022

Justine Brasseur (born July 10, 2001) is a retired Canadian pair skater. With former partner, Mark Bardei, she is the 2019 CS Warsaw Cup bronze medalist.

With former partner Mathieu Ostiguy, she placed seventh at the 2016 World Junior Championships.

== Personal life ==
Justine Brasseur was born on July 10, 2001, in LaSalle, Quebec. She is the niece of 1993 World pair skating champion Isabelle Brasseur.

== Career ==
=== Early years ===
Brasseur began learning to skate in 2003.

She teamed up with Mathieu Ostiguy in May 2014. The pair placed fourth at the 2016 Youth Olympics in Hamar, Norway, and seventh at the 2016 World Junior Championships in Debrecen, Hungary. They were coached by Bruno Marcotte, Richard Gauthier, Sylvie Fullum, and Julie Marcotte.

In September 2017, Brasseur appeared with Mark Bardei on the entry list for a Quebec competition. They later withdrew from the event.

=== 2018–2019 season ===
Brasseur/Bardei were scheduled to make their international debut at the 2018 CS Golden Spin of Zagreb, but withdrew from the event. They competed at the 2019 Canadian Championships, placing fifth overall, and coming third in the free skate. Brasseur deemed it "not our best performance", but both enjoyed competing again after some years away.

=== 2019–2020 season ===
Making their international debut together, Brasseur/Bardei competed on the Challenger series at the 2019 CS Warsaw Cup. Fourth in the short program and third in the free skate, they won the bronze medal. They placed fourth at the 2020 Canadian Championships.

In April, it was announced that they had split.

=== 2020–2021 season ===
In October 2020, Brasseur announced that she had formed a new partnership with Zachary Daleman, and they were added to Skate Canada's NextGen program. Training in Oakville under Bruno Marcotte and Meagan Duhamel, they competed for the first time at the Ontario sectionals in November. They subsequently competed at the virtual 2021 Skate Canada Challenge, placing sixth, which would have qualified them to the 2021 Canadian Championships had they not been cancelled due to the COVID-19 pandemic.

== Programs ==
=== With Daleman ===
Season	Short program	Free skating
2020–2021	Come Fly With Me by Sammy Cahn, Jimmy Van Heusen performed by Ruelle choreo. by Julie Marcotte	Fortitude by Haevn choreo. by Julie Marcotte

=== With Bardei ===
Season	Short program	Free skating
2018–2020	Way Down We Go by Kaleo choreo. by Julie Marcotte	Il etait une fois le diable by Ennio Morricone performed by Angèle Dubeau & La Pietà choreo. by Julie Marcotte

=== With Ostiguy ===
Season	Short program	Free skating
2016–2017	Die Another Day by Madonna; Percucajon by Thompson	Cinderella by Patrick Doyle; La Valse d'Amour; Pumpkin and Mice; Who Is She; Courage and Kindness
2015–2016	Bernie's Tune by Al Caiola; Peter Gunn Mambo	Arabia; Aranjuez mon amour; Dona Julia

== Competitive highlights ==
CS: Challenger Series; JGP: Junior Grand Prix

=== Pairs with Daleman ===
National
Event	2020–21
Canadian Champ.	C
SC Challenge	6th
Ontario Sectionals	3rd
TBD = Assigned; WD = Withdrew

=== Pairs with Bardei ===
International
Event	2018–19	2019–20
CS Warsaw Cup		3rd
Challenge Cup	WD	
National
Canadian Champ.	5th	4th
WD = Withdrew

=== Pairs with Ostiguy ===
International
Event	2014–15	2015–16	2016–17
Junior Worlds		7th	
Youth Olympics		4th	
JGP Austria		5th	
JGP Czech Republic			11th
JGP Germany			6th
JGP Latvia		6th	
National
Canadian Champ.	1st N	4th J	
SC Challenge	1st N	2nd J	
Section Québec	2nd N	1st J	
Levels: N = Novice; J = Junior

=== Single skating ===
National
Event	2014–15
Canadian Championships	3rd N
N = Novice level
