= Mathieu Ostiguy =

Canadian pair skater

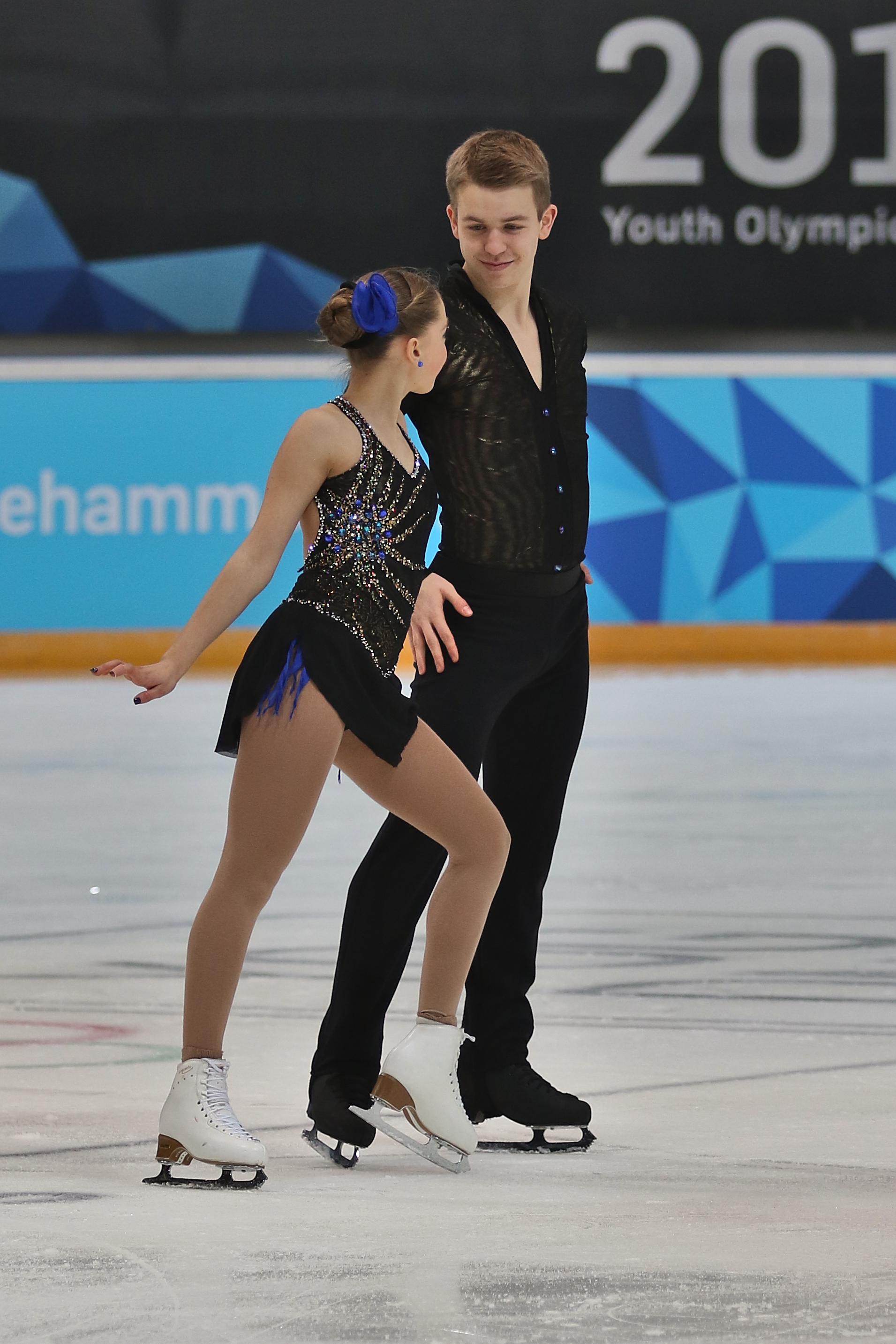
- Ostiguy at the 2016 Youth Olympics

Personal information
- Born: January 27, 1997 (age 29) Granby, Quebec, Canada
- Home town: Sainte-Angèle-de-Monnoir, Quebec
- Height: 1.75 m (5 ft 9 in)

Figure skating career
- Country: Canada
- Coach: Richard Gauthier, Bruno Marcotte, Nicholas Young
- Skating club: CPA St-Césaire
- Began skating: 2004
- Retired: February 18, 2020

Mathieu Ostiguy (born January 27, 1997) is a former Canadian pair skater. He won the 2019 Canadian junior nationals with partner Chloe Choinard. With partner Justine Brasseur, he placed fourth at the 2016 Youth Olympics in Hamar and seventh at the 2016 World Junior Championships in Debrecen.

Brasseur/Ostiguy began skating together in May 2014. They were coached by Bruno Marcotte, Richard Gauthier, Sylvie Fullum, and Julie Marcotte. Their partnership ended after the 2016–2017 season. In spring 2017, Ostiguy teamed up with Chloe Choinard. He and Choinhard broke up in Summer 2019, and on February 18, 2020, Ostiguy retired.

== Programs ==
=== With Choinard ===
Season	Short program	Free skating
2017–2018	Primavera by Ludovico Einaudi	The Artist by Ludovic Bource; Waltz for Peppy; The Artist Ouverture; Comme une rosée de larmes; My Suicide

=== With Brasseur ===
Season	Short program	Free skating
2016–2017	Die Another Day by Madonna; Percucajon by Thompson	Cinderella by Patrick Doyle; La Valse d'Amour; Pumpkin and Mice; Who Is She; Courage and Kindness
2015–2016	Bernie's Tune by Al Caiola; Peter Gunn Mambo	Arabia; Aranjuez mon amour; Dona Julia

== Competitive highlights ==
JGP: Junior Grand Prix

=== Pairs with Choinard ===
International
Event	2017–18	2018–19
JGP Croatia	12th	
JGP Latvia	7th	
National
Canadian Champ.	5th J	1st J
SC Challenge	10th J	1st J

=== Pairs with Brasseur ===
International
Event	2015–16	2016–17
Junior Worlds	7th	
Youth Olympics	4th	
JGP Austria	5th	
JGP Czech Republic		11th
JGP Germany		6th
JGP Latvia	6th	
National
Canadian Champ.	4th J	
SC Challenge	2nd J	

=== Single skating ===
National
Event	2012–13	2013–14
Canadian Champ.	15th J	14th J
