= 2018 Skate America =

Figure skating competition

- Type: Grand Prix
- Date: October 19 – 21
- Season: 2018–19
- Location: Everett, Washington
- Host: U.S. Figure Skating
- Venue: Angel of the Winds Arena

Champions
- Men's singles: (United States) Nathan Chen
- Ladies' singles: (Japan) Satoko Miyahara
- Pairs: (Russia) Evgenia Tarasova / Vladimir Morozov
- Ice dance: (United States) Madison Hubbell / Zachary Donohue
- Previous: 2017 Skate America
- Next: 2019 Skate America
- Next Grand Prix: 2018 Skate Canada International

The 2018 Skate America was the first event of six in the 2018–19 ISU Grand Prix of Figure Skating, a senior-level international invitational competition series. It was held at Angel of the Winds Arena in Everett, Washington on October 19–21. Medals were awarded in the disciplines of men's singles, ladies' singles, pair skating, and ice dancing. Skaters earned points toward qualifying for the 2018–19 Grand Prix Final.

== Entries ==
The ISU published the preliminary assignments on June 29, 2018.

Country	Men	Ladies	Pairs	Ice dancing
Belgium		Loena Hendrickx		
Canada	Nam Nguyen; Kevin Reynolds	Alaine Chartrand	Evelyn Walsh / Trennt Michaud	
Czech Republic	Michal Březina			
France	Romain Ponsart	Laurine Lecavelier		
Georgia	Morisi Kvitelashvili			
Germany			Minerva Fabienne Hase / Nolan Seegert; Annika Hocke / Ruben Blommaert	Katharina Müller / Tim Dieck
Israel	Alexei Bychenko			
Italy	Matteo Rizzo			Charlène Guignard / Marco Fabbri
Japan		Marin Honda; Satoko Miyahara; Kaori Sakamoto		
Malaysia	Julian Zhi Jie Yee			
Poland				Natalia Kaliszek / Maksym Spodyriev
Russia	Sergei Voronov	Sofia Samodurova; Polina Tsurskaya	Alisa Efimova / Alexander Korovin; Evgenia Tarasova / Vladimir Morozov	Tiffany Zahorski / Jonathan Guerreiro
Ukraine				Alexandra Nazarova / Maxim Nikitin
United Kingdom				Lilah Fear / Lewis Gibson; Robynne Tweedale / Joseph Buckland
United States	Nathan Chen; Jimmy Ma; Vincent Zhou	Starr Andrews; Bradie Tennell; Megan Wessenberg	Ashley Cain / Timothy LeDuc; Nica Digerness / Danny Neudecker; Alexa Scimeca Knierim / Chris Knierim	Madison Hubbell / Zachary Donohue; Karina Manta / Joseph Johnson; Lorraine McNamara / Quinn Carpenter

=== Changes to preliminary assignments ===
Date	Discipline	Withdrew	Added	Reason/Other notes	Refs
July 9 and 31	Pairs	(China) Yu Xiaoyu / Zhang Hao	(Germany) Minerva Fabienne Hase / Nolan Seegert	Foot injury (Yu)	
July 18 and September 7	Ice dance	(South Korea) Yura Min / Alexander Gamelin	(United Kingdom) Robynne Tweedale / Joseph Buckland	Split	
August 9 and 16	Ladies	(Slovakia) Nicole Rajičová	(Canada) Alaine Chartrand		
August 15 and 16	Men	(Belgium) Jorik Hendrickx	(Canada) Kevin Reynolds		
September 10	Men	N/A	(United States) Jimmy Ma	Host pick	
September 10	Ladies	N/A	(United States) Megan Wessenberg	Host pick	
September 10	Pairs	N/A	(United States) Nica Digerness / Danny Neudecker	Host pick	
September 10	Ice dance	N/A	(United States) Karina Manta / Joseph Johnson	Host pick	
October 8 and 9	Pairs	(China) Li Xiangning / Xie Zhong	(Canada) Evelyn Walsh / Trennt Michaud		
October 15	Ladies	(Russia) Elena Radionova	N/A	Back injury	

== Results ==
=== Men ===
Rank	Name	Nation	Total points	SP		FS	
1	Nathan Chen	United States	280.57	1	90.58	1	189.99
2	Michal Březina	Czech Republic	239.51	2	82.09	2	157.42
3	Sergei Voronov	Russia	226.44	4	78.18	4	148.26
4	Matteo Rizzo	Italy	225.81	5	78.09	5	147.72
5	Vincent Zhou	United States	225.75	6	76.38	3	149.37
6	Nam Nguyen	Canada	212.99	9	69.86	6	143.13
7	Julian Zhi Jie Yee	Malaysia	207.51	3	81.52	9	125.99
8	Morisi Kvitelashvili	Georgia	205.12	11	68.58	7	136.54
9	Alexei Bychenko	Israel	197.47	10	69.69	8	127.78
10	Romain Ponsart	France	187.92	8	71.48	11	116.44
11	Kevin Reynolds	Canada	185.63	12	61.62	10	124.01
12	Jimmy Ma	United States	185.06	7	71.53	12	113.53

=== Ladies ===
Rank	Name	Nation	Total points	SP		FS	
1	Satoko Miyahara	Japan	219.71	1	73.86	1	145.85
2	Kaori Sakamoto	Japan	213.90	2	71.29	2	142.61
3	Sofia Samodurova	Russia	198.70	3	64.41	3	134.29
4	Bradie Tennell	United States	192.89	5	61.72	4	131.17
5	Laurine Lecavelier	France	172.41	7	59.57	5	112.84
6	Megan Wessenberg	United States	170.33	6	60.20	6	110.13
7	Polina Tsurskaya	Russia	159.45	8	58.42	8	101.03
8	Marin Honda	Japan	158.04	4	62.74	9	95.30
9	Alaine Chartrand	Canada	155.49	11	46.99	7	108.50
10	Starr Andrews	United States	150.56	9	56.03	10	94.53
WD	Loena Hendrickx	Belgium	withdrew	10	54.13	withdrew from competition	

=== Pairs ===
Rank	Name	Nation	Total points	SP		FS	
1	Evgenia Tarasova / Vladimir Morozov	Russia	204.85	1	71.24	1	133.61
2	Alisa Efimova / Alexander Korovin	Russia	178.98	2	62.38	3	116.60
3	Ashley Cain / Timothy LeDuc	United States	175.06	4	57.72	2	117.34
4	Alexa Scimeca Knierim / Chris Knierim	United States	171.56	5	57.31	4	114.25
5	Minerva Fabienne Hase / Nolan Seegert	Germany	162.10	3	60.04	5	102.06
6	Nica Digerness / Danny Neudecker	United States	151.21	7	51.56	6	99.65
7	Annika Hocke / Ruben Blommaert	Germany	144.53	6	53.36	7	91.17
8	Evelyn Walsh / Trennt Michaud	Canada	129.06	8	44.71	8	84.35

=== Ice dancing ===
Rank	Name	Nation	Total points	RD		FD	
1	Madison Hubbell / Zachary Donohue	United States	200.82	1	78.43	1	122.39
2	Charlène Guignard / Marco Fabbri	Italy	192.30	2	75.01	2	117.29
3	Tiffany Zahorski / Jonathan Guerreiro	Russia	181.38	3	73.30	4	108.08
4	Lorraine McNamara / Quinn Carpenter	United States	180.57	4	72.44	3	108.13
5	Lilah Fear / Lewis Gibson	Great Britain	170.70	5	64.71	5	105.99
6	Natalia Kaliszek / Maksym Spodyriev	Poland	163.05	6	62.78	6	100.27
7	Katharina Müller / Tim Dieck	Germany	158.11	7	60.12	7	97.99
8	Alexandra Nazarova / Maxim Nikitin	Ukraine	156.16	8	58.32	8	97.84
9	Robynne Tweedale / Joseph Buckland	Great Britain	152.69	9	57.77	9	94.92
10	Karina Manta / Joseph Johnson	United States	139.33	10	51.89	10	87.44
