= Li Xiangning =

Chinese figure skater

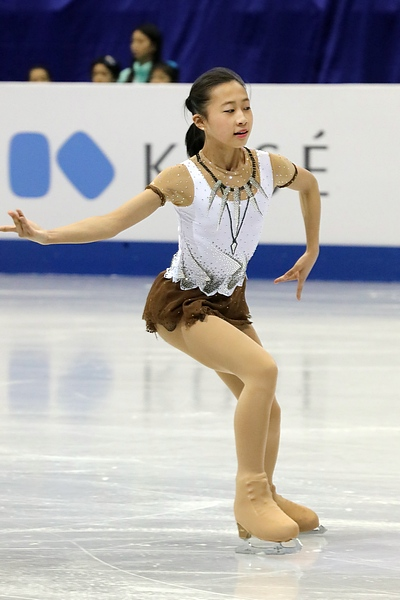
- Li at the 2017 Junior Worlds

Personal information
- Born: May 11, 2000 (age 26) Qiqihar, Heilongjiang, China
- Height: 1.52 m (5 ft 0 in)

Figure skating career
- Country: China
- Coach: Xu Ming
- Skating club: Qiqihar Winter Sports Centre
- Began skating: 2005
Medal record
Figure skating: Ladies' singles
Representing Mixed-NOCs
Winter Youth Olympics
Gold medal – first place	2016 Lillehammer	Team

Li Xiangning (Chinese: 李香凝; pinyin: Lǐ Xiāngníng; Mandarin pronunciation: [lì ɕjáŋ nǐŋ]; born May 11, 2000) is a Chinese figure skater. She is the 2018 Cup of Nice silver medalist, the 2018 Chinese national champion, and a two-time Chinese national silver medalist (2016, 2017).

On the junior level, she is the 2016 Youth Olympic champion in the team event.

She placed 22nd at the 2018 Winter Olympics and 12th at the 2016 Youth Olympics.

Li switched to pair skating during the 2018–19 figure skating season, partnering with Xie Zhong, but has since returned to singles before ever debuting competitively in pairs.

== Career ==
=== Early years ===
Li began learning to skate in 2004. She debuted on the ISU Junior Grand Prix series in August 2013, placing 10th in Riga, Latvia.

=== 2014–2015 season ===
Li qualified to the final segment in her first appearance at an ISU Championship – the World Junior Championships, held in March in Tallinn, Estonia; she placed 24th in the short program, 20th in the free skate, and 21st overall.

=== 2015–2016 season ===
In February 2016, Li placed 12th in her individual event at the Winter Youth Olympic in Hamar, Norway. She won gold in the team event, having competed as a member of Team Desire. The following month, she finished 20th at the 2016 World Junior Championships in Debrecen, Hungary.

=== 2016–2017 season ===
Li's senior international debut came in November 2016 at the Cup of China; she finished 10th at her first Grand Prix assignment. She ranked 13th at the 2017 Four Continents Championships in Gangneung, South Korea, and then 11th at the 2017 World Junior Championships in Taipei, Taiwan. Concluding her season, she placed 14th — seven places ahead of China's other entry in the ladies' event, Li Zijun — at the 2017 World Championships in Helsinki, Finland.

=== 2017–2018 season ===
Li won her first senior international medal, silver, at the International Cup of Nice in October 2017. In January, she finished tenth at the 2018 Four Continents Championships in Taipei. In February, she competed at the 2018 Winter Olympics in PyeongChang, South Korea. She qualified to the final segment and finished 22nd overall. She was less successful at the 2018 World Championships in Milan, Italy. Ranked 26th in the short program, she did not advance to the free skate.

=== 2018–2019 season ===
In 2018, Li teamed up with Xie Zhong to compete in pair skating. The new pair was invited to two Grand Prix events, the 2018 Skate America and 2018 Grand Prix of Helsinki. It was unclear how the two were eligible according to the International Skating Union's rules for the Grand Prix series. They later withdrew from both competitions.

== Programs ==
=== Pair skating with Xie ===
Season	Short program	Free skating
2018–2019	Right by you by Justin Nozuka; Be Mine by Ofenbach	The Departure (Lullaby) (from The Leftovers) by Max Richter

=== Single skating ===
Season	Short program	Free skating
2017–2018	Cinema Paradiso by Ennio Morricone, Andrea Morricone choreo. by David Wilson	Raymonda by Alexander Glazunov choreo. by David Wilson
2016–2017	Waltz from Coppélia by Léo Delibes choreo. by Elvin Huang	Princess Mononoke by Joe Hisaishi choreo. by Elvin Huang
2015–2016	Spring Breeze by Deng Yuxian choreo. by Elvin Huang	My Fair Lady by Frederick Loewe choreo. by Elvin Huang
2014–2015	Waltz No. 2 by Dmitri Shostakovich	Home Alone by John Williams
2013–2014	Waltz No. 2 by Dmitri Shostakovich performed by André Rieu	Nocturne; Pick Yourself Up

== Competitive highlights ==
GP: Grand Prix; JGP: Junior Grand Prix

=== Pair skating with Xie ===
International
Event	18–19
GP Skate America	WD
GP Helsinki	WD
WD = Withdrew

=== Single skating ===
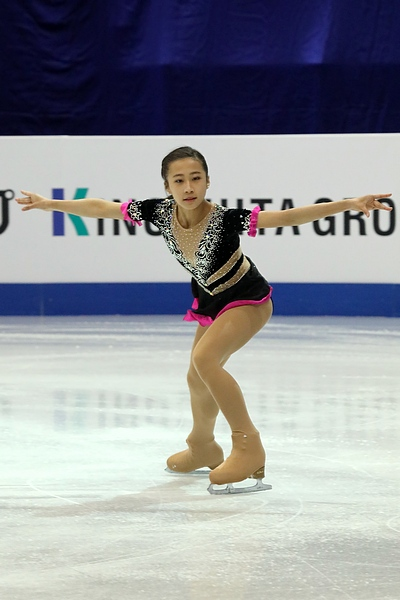
Li at the 2017 Junior Worlds

International
Event	12–13	13–14	14–15	15–16	16–17	17–18	18–19	19–20
Olympics						22nd		
Worlds					14th	26th		
Four Continents					13th	10th		
GP Skate America						10th		
GP Cup of China					10th	8th		
GP NHK Trophy							WD	
Cup of Nice						2nd		
International: Junior
Youth Olympics				12th				
Junior Worlds			21st	20th	11th			
JGP Austria				6th				
JGP Japan			10th					
JGP Latvia		10th		6th				
JGP Slovenia			12th					
National
Chinese Champ.	12th	3rd	3rd	2nd	2nd	1st		13th
Team events
Olympics						6th T 7th P		
Youth Olympics				1st T 4th P				
World Team; Trophy					5th T 8th P			
J = Junior level; WD = Withdrew; T = Team result; P = Personal result. Medals awarded for team result only.
