= Diāna Ņikitina =

Latvian figure skater

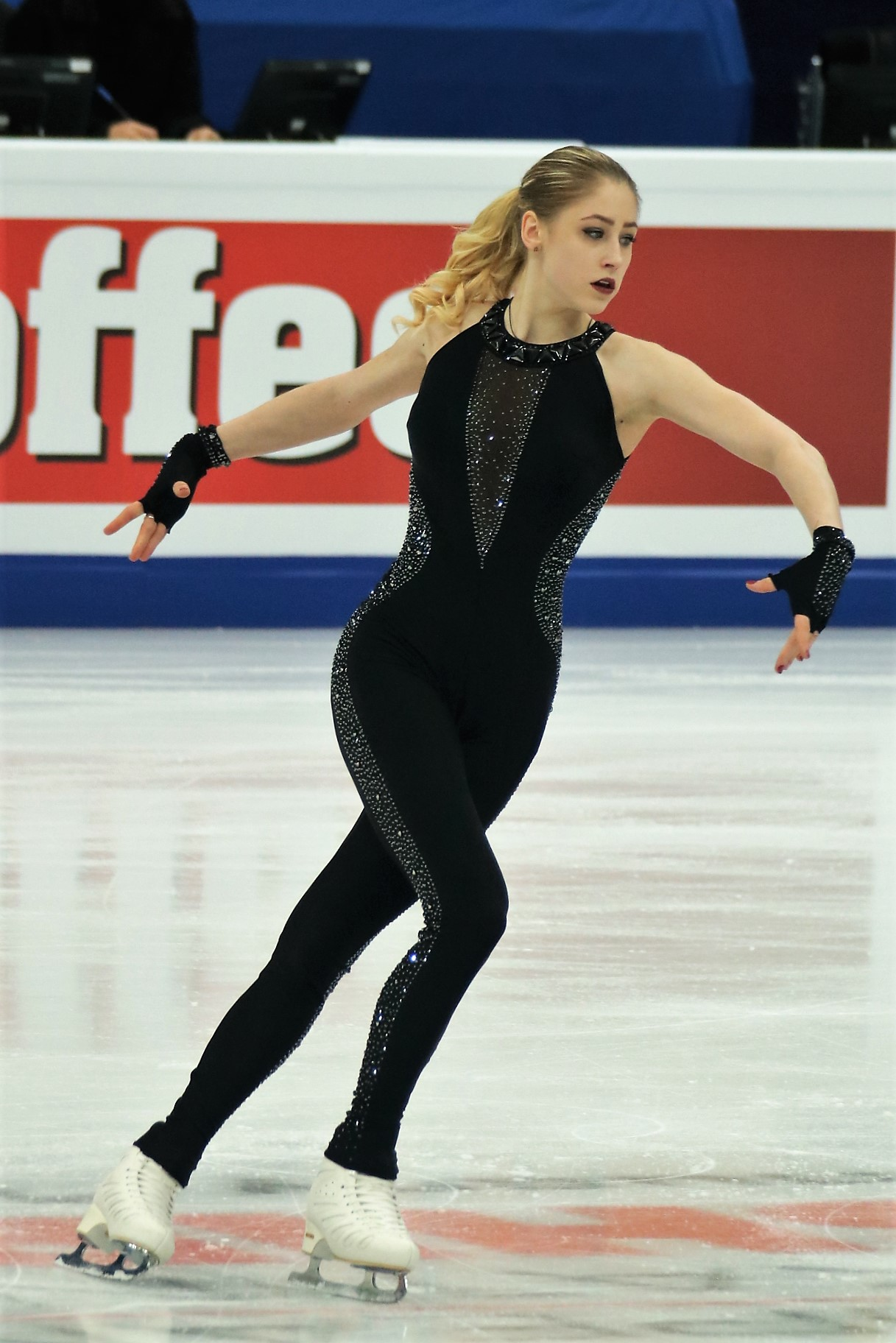
- Ņikitina at the 2018 European Championships

Personal information
- Born: 9 December 2000 (age 25) Riga, Latvia
- Height: 1.73 m (5 ft 8 in)

Figure skating career
- Country: Latvia
- Coach: Stephane Lambiel
- Skating club: JLSS Jelgava
- Began skating: 2004
- Retired: 2018?
Medal record
Figure skating: Ladies' singles
Representing Mixed-NOCs
Winter Youth Olympics
Silver medal – second place	2016 Lillehammer	Team

Diāna Ņikitina (born 9 December 2000) is a Latvian former figure skater. She is the 2017 Golden Bear of Zagreb champion, the 2018 Cup of Tyrol silver medalist, and the 2018 Latvian national champion. She competed at the 2018 Winter Olympics in PyeongChang, placing 26th.

Earlier in her career, Ņikitina placed within the top ten at two World Junior Championships and won silver in the team event at the 2016 Winter Youth Olympics.

== Early life ==
Diāna Ņikitina was born on 9 December 2000 in Riga, Latvia. She studied through distance education at Riga Secondary School No. 1. She began skating at age four after being given a pair of skates for her birthday.

== Career ==
Ņikitina competed internationally on the novice level in the 2012–13 and 2013–14 seasons.

She moved up to the junior level in the 2014–15 season. Making her ISU Junior Grand Prix (JGP) debut, Ņikitina placed 11th in Japan in September 2014 and 5th in Croatia the following month. In March 2015, she competed at the World Junior Championships in Tallinn, Estonia, and qualified for the free skate by placing 13th in the short program. Her 10th place in the free lifted her to 10th overall.

During the 2015–16 JGP series, Ņikitina placed 12th in Latvia and 5th in Poland. She then collected three junior international medals – gold at the Volvo Open Cup, bronze at the Tallinn Trophy, and silver at the Toruń Cup. In February 2016, Ņikitina represented Latvia at the 2016 Winter Youth Olympics in Hamar, Norway; she placed 5th in the individual event and won silver in the team event. In March, she finished 10th at the 2016 World Junior Championships in Debrecen, Hungary.

In 2016, she moved to Switzerland to be coached by Stéphane Lambiel. An ankle injury prevented her from competing very much during the 2016–2017 season.

Ņikitina made her senior debut in 2017. She placed 10th at the 2017 Ondrej Nepela Trophy and won the Golden Bear of Zagreb and the Latvian Championships. At the 2018 European Championships, she placed 36th.

She placed 26th at the 2018 Winter Olympics, which was her last competition. She, along with Deniss Vasiļjevs, were the first figure skaters to represent Latvia at the Olympics since the 1994 Winter Olympics. Her choice of music (Soldier of Love by Sade) and costume, which consisted of a pantsuit with black accessories rather than the more typical dresses worn in skating, attracted media attention and praise.

Ņikitina required surgery for an injury afterward, and she ended her competitive career. She said that she did not receive financial support from the Latvian Skating Association despite meeting several placement targets they had set throughout her career, and she lost motivation to continue competing.

== Programs ==
Season	Short program	Free skating
2017–2018	Soldier Of Love by Sade	Nocturne (from La califfa) by Ennio Morricone; Trooping With Crows (from Romeo and Juliet) by Abel Korzeniowski
2016–2017	Lacrymosa by Evanescence choreo. by Svetlana Korol	Alice in Wonderland by Danny Elfman choreo. by Svetlana Korol
2015–2016	Les feuilles mortes by Joseph Kosma choreo. by Svetlana Korol	The Piano by Michael Nyman choreo. by Svetlana Korol
2014–2015	Les feuilles mortes by Joseph Kosma choreo. by Svetlana Korol	Cabaret by John Kander choreo. by Svetlana Korol
2013–2014	The Master and Margarita by Igor Kornelyuk	Cabaret by John Kander choreo. by Svetlana Korol
2012–2013	The Master and Margarita by Igor Kornelyuk	The Umbrellas of Cherbourg by Michel Legrand

== Competitive highlights ==
CS: Challenger Series; JGP: Junior Grand Prix

International
Event	14–15	15–16	16–17	17–18
Olympics				26th
Europeans				36th
CS Ondrej Nepela				10th
Cup of Tyrol				2nd
Golden Bear				1st
International: Junior
Junior Worlds	10th	10th	30th	
Youth Olympics		5th		
JGP Croatia	5th			
JGP Czech Rep.			7th	
JGP Germany			WD	
JGP Japan	11th			
JGP Latvia		12th		
JGP Poland		5th		
Jégvirág Cup	1st			
Tallinn Trophy		3rd		
Toruń Cup		2nd		
Volvo Open Cup	1st	1st		
National
Latvian Champ.	1st J	1st J		1st
Team events
Youth Olympics		2nd T 2nd P		
