= Xie Zhong =

Chinese pair skater

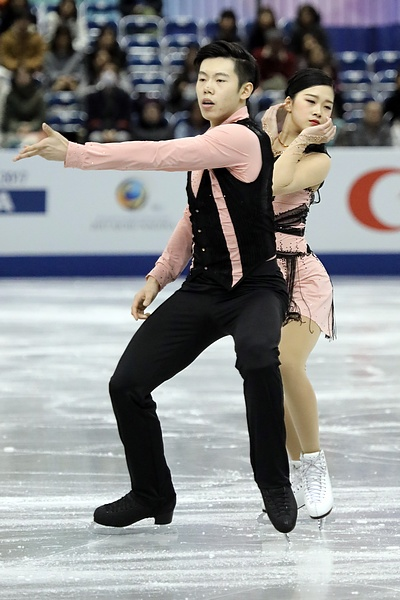
- Xie/Gao at the 2017–18 JGP Final

Personal information
- Native name: 解众 (Chinese)
- Born: September 19, 1998 (age 28) Harbin, China
- Height: 1.75 m (5 ft 9 in)

Figure skating career
- Country: China
- Coach: Zhao Hongbo
- Skating club: China Youth Team
- Began skating: 2003
Medal record
Figure skating: Pairs
Representing China (with Gao Yumeng)
World Junior Championships
Bronze medal – third place	2017 Taipei	Pairs

Xie Zhong (simplified Chinese: 解众; traditional Chinese: 解眾; pinyin: Xiè Zhòng; born September 19, 1998) is a Chinese pair skater. With his former skating partner, Gao Yumeng, he is the 2017 World Junior bronze medalist and 2017 Chinese national bronze medalist on the senior level.

== Early career ==
Xie began learning to skate in 2003. Following a partnership with Wang Wen, he teamed up with Zhang Mingyang. The two competed on the 2013 Junior Grand Prix (JGP) series, placing fourth in August in Riga, Latvia.

Xie placed fifth skating with Zhang Ziyi at the Chinese Championships in December 2014.

=== 2015–2016 season ===
During the 2015–2016 season, Xie skated in partnership with Zhao Ying. They appeared at two 2015 JGP events, placing 8th in August in Riga, Latvia, and 7th the following month in Linz, Austria. Competing on the senior level, the pair won the bronze medal at the Chinese Championships in December. They placed 5th at the 2016 Winter Youth Olympics, held in February in Hamar, Norway.

Zhao/Xie were assigned to the 2016 World Junior Championships but withdrew a couple of weeks before the start of the event. The pair was coached by Luan Bo, Song Lun, and Li Yanwei in Harbin, China.

== Partnership with Gao Yumeng ==
Xie and Gao Yumeng are coached by Zhao Hongbo in Beijing.

=== 2016–2017 season ===
Making their international debut as a pair, Gao/Xie placed 5th at a Junior Grand Prix (JGP) event in early September 2016 in Ostrava, Czech Republic. They had the same result at their second JGP assignment, in Saransk, Russia. In December, they won the bronze medal competing as seniors at the Chinese Championships.

In March 2017, Gao/Xie won the bronze medal at the World Junior Championships in Taipei, having ranked second in the short program and third in the free skate.

=== 2017–2018 season ===
Gao/Xie placed 4th at JGP Poland and 2nd at JGP Croatia, qualifying for the Junior Grand Prix Final (JGPF). They finished 4th at both JGPF and World Junior Championships. They split at the end of this season.

== Programs ==
=== With Liu Jiaxi ===
Season	Short program	Free skating
2019–2020		I'd Rather Go Blind performed by Beth Hart

=== With Li Xiangning ===
Season	Short program	Free skating
2018–2019	Right by you by Justin Nozuka; Be Mine by Ofenbach	

=== With Gao Yumeng ===
Season	Short program	Free skating
2017–2018	Chicago (soundtrack) from Chicago	Turning Page from The Twilight Saga: Breaking Dawn – Part 1 (soundtrack)
2016–2017	Cavatina (from The Deer Hunter) by Stanley Myers	Crunchy Granola Suite by Neil Diamond

=== With Zhao Ying ===
Season	Short program	Free skating
2015–2016	Piano Concerto No. 23 – Andante by Wolfgang Amadeus Mozart	Don Quixote by Ludwig Minkus

=== With Zhang Mingyang ===
Season	Short program	Free skating
2013–2014	100 Years of Strauss performed by André Rieu	La Strada by Nino Rota

== Competitive highlights ==
GP: Grand Prix; JGP: Junior Grand Prix

=== With Liu Jiaxi ===
National
Event	2019–20
Chinese Champ.	3rd

=== With Li Xiangning ===
International
Event	18–19
GP Finland	WD
GP Skate America	WD

=== With Gao Yumeng ===
International
Event	2016–17	2017–18
Junior Worlds	3rd	4th
JGP Final		4th
JGP Czech Rep.	5th	
JGP Russia	5th	
JGP Croatia		2nd
JGP Poland		4th
National
Chinese Champ.	3rd	4th

=== Earlier partnerships ===
International
Event	2013–14 (Zhang Mingyang)	2014–15 (Zhang Ziyi)	2015–16 (Zhao Ying)
Junior Worlds			WD
Youth Olympics			5th
JGP Austria			7th
JGP Latvia	4th		8th
National
Chinese Champ.		5th	3rd
Team events
Youth Olympics			5th T 4th P
WD= Withdrew; T = Team result; P = Personal result Medals awarded for team result only.
