= Natasha Purich =

Canadian pair skater

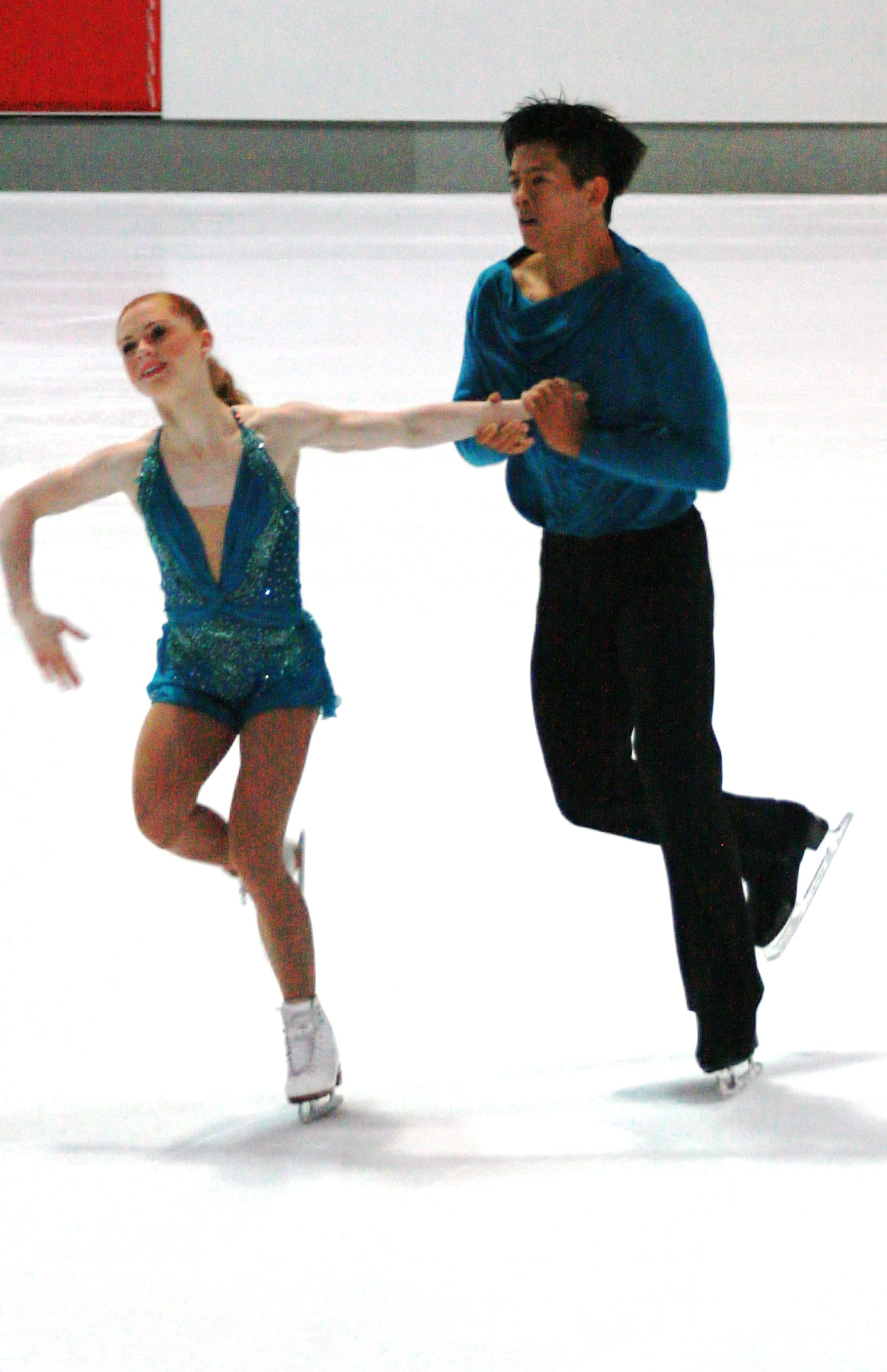
- Purich/Tran at the 2013 Nebelhorn Trophy

Personal information
- Born: June 5, 1995 (age 31) Edmonton, Alberta
- Height: 1.49 m (4 ft 10 1/2 in)

Figure skating career
- Country: Canada
- Coach: Annabelle Langlois, Cody Hay
- Skating club: St. Leonard FSC
- Began skating: 2002

Natasha Purich (/ˈpʊrɪtʃ/ PUUR-itch; born June 5, 1995) is a Canadian pair skater.

With former partner Raymond Schultz, she placed fifth at the 2011 World Junior Championships and won the 2011 Canadian junior title. After their partnership ended in 2012, Purich teamed up with Sebastian Arcieri for 2012–13 season. She competed with Mervin Tran for the 2013–14 season before switching to Andrew Wolfe for the 2014–15 season.

She also partnered with Bryce Chudak.

Purich has also competed in single skating.

== Programs ==
=== With Chudak ===
Season	Short program	Free skating
2020–2021	Never Tear Us Apart by Paloma Faith	Fix You by Coldplay

=== With Tran ===
Season	Short program	Free skating	Exhibition
2013–2014	Tiny Dancer by Elton John	Life Is Beautiful by Nicola Piovani: Buon Giorno Principessa; Grand Hotel Valse; Valse Larmoyante	Tiny Dancer by Elton John

=== With Arcieri ===
Season	Short program	Free skating
2012–2013	They Can't Take That Away From Me by Percy Faith	Mack and Mable Overture

=== With Schultz ===
Season	Short program	Free skating
2011–2012	Night Train by Jimmy Forrest	Spellbound Concerto by Miklós Rózsa
2010–2011	Zorba the Greek performed by Gipsy Kings	St. Louis Blues by Doc Severinsen

=== Single skating ===
Season	Short program	Free skating
2010–2011	El Choclo by Angel Villoldo	Le Cocher de la Troika; Moldavian Suite; Green Grass by Paul Mauriat

== Competitive highlights ==
GP: Grand Prix; JGP: Junior Grand Prix

=== Pairs with Chudak ===
International
Event	19–20	20–21
GP Skate Canada		C
National
Canadian Champs	7th	C
SC Challenge		5th
TBD = Assigned; C = Event Cancelled

=== Pairs with Wolfe ===
International
Event	2014–2015
GP Cup of China	6th
National
Canadian Championships	6th

=== Pairs with Tran ===
International
Event	2013–2014
Four Continents Championships	5th
GP Trophée Eric Bompard	6th
Nebelhorn Trophy	6th
National
Canadian Championships	4th

=== Pairs with Arcieri ===
International
Event	2012–2013
JGP Austria	10th
JGP Germany	6th
National
Canadian Championships	2nd J.
J = Junior level

=== Pairs with Schultz ===
International
Event	2010–11	2011–12
GP NHK Trophy		8th
International: Junior
World Junior Championships	5th	
JGP Final	7th	
JGP Czech Republic	3rd	
JGP United Kingdom	3rd	
National
Canadian Championships	1st J	8th
J = Junior level

=== Ladies' singles ===
International
Event	2010–11	2011–12	2012–13
JGP Austria		9th	
National
Canadian Champ.	4th J	8th J	4th J.
J = Junior level
