= Bryce Chudak =

Canadian pair skater

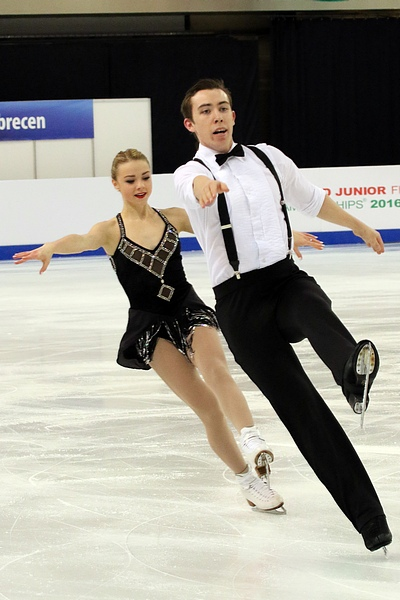

Personal information
- Born: March 21, 1995 (age 31) Rocky Mountain House, Alberta, Canada
- Height: 1.80 m (5 ft 11 in)

Figure skating career
- Country: Canada
- Partner: Natasha Purich
- Coach: Anabelle Langlois, Cody Hay
- Skating club: Calalta FSC Calgary
- Began skating: 1999
- Retired: March 11, 2022

Bryce Chudak (born March 21, 1995) is a retired Canadian pair skater, who most recently competed with Natasha Purich.

== Career ==
Chudak previously competed with Bryn Hoffman, winning the junior silver medal at the 2016 Canadian Championships and competing at the 2016 World Junior Championships in Debrecen, Hungary. They placed sixth in the short program, tenth in the free skate, and eighth overall.

Hoffman/Chudak had previously withdrawn from the 2014 Canadian Championships due to Chudak's shoulder injury. They were coached by Anabelle Langlois and Cody Hay in Calgary, Alberta.

== Programs ==
(with Purich)

Season	Short program	Free skating
2020–2021	Never Tear Us Apart by Paloma Faith	Fix You by Coldplay

(with Hoffman)

Season	Short program	Free skating
2015–16	Roxy; Hot Honey Rag	Notre-Dame de Paris by Riccardo Cocciante; Les Temps des Cathedrales; Danse Mon Esmeralda

== Competitive highlights ==
JGP: Junior Grand Prix

=== With Purich ===
International
Event	19–20	20–21
GP Skate Canada		C
National
Canadian Champs	7th	C
SC Challenge		5th
TBD = Assigned; C = Event Cancelled

=== With Hoffman ===
International
Event	2013–14	2014–15	2015–16
Junior Worlds			8th
JGP Poland			4th
JGP United States			4th
National
Canadian Champ.	WD	7th J.	2nd J.
J. = Junior level; WD = Withdrew
