= Bryn Hoffman =

Canadian pair skater

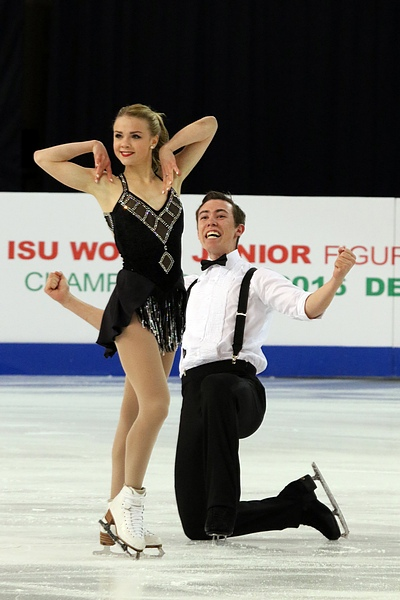

Personal information
- Born: June 14, 1997 (age 29) Whitehorse, Yukon, Canada
- Height: 1.57 m (5 ft 2 in)

Figure skating career
- Country: Canada
- Skating club: Calatta FSC Calgary
- Began skating: 2000

Bryn Hoffman (born June 14, 1997) is a Canadian pair skater. She previously competed with Bryce Chudak, winning the junior silver medal at the 2016 Canadian Nationals, and competing at the 2016 World Junior Championships in Debrecen, Hungary. They placed sixth in the short program, tenth in the free skate, and eighth overall.

Hoffman/Chudak withdrew from the 2014 Canadian Nationals due to Chudak's shoulder injury. They were coached by Anabelle Langlois and Cody Hay in Calgary, Alberta.

Hoffman retired from competitive skating in 2017 due to injury. She graduated from McGill University with a BSc in 2020 and then from Queen's University School of Medicine in 2024. She is currently completing her residency in neurosurgery at the University of Toronto.

== Programs ==
(with Chudak)

Season	Short program	Free skating
2015–16	Roxy; Hot Honey Rag	Notre-Dame de Paris by Riccardo Cocciante; Les Temps des Cathedrales; Danse Mon Esmeralda

== Competitive highlights ==
JGP: Junior Grand Prix

With Chudak

International
Event	2013–14	2014–15	2015–16
Junior Worlds			8th
JGP Poland			4th
JGP United States			4th
National
Canadian Champ.	WD	7th J.	2nd J.
J. = Junior level; WD = Withdrew
