= 2016 Canadian Figure Skating Championships =

Figure skating competition

- Type: National championship
- Date: January 18 – 24
- Season: 2015–16
- Location: Halifax, Nova Scotia
- Host: Skate Canada
- Venue: Scotiabank Centre

Champions
- Men's singles: Patrick Chan
- Ladies' singles: Alaine Chartrand
- Pairs: Meagan Duhamel / Eric Radford
- Ice dance: Kaitlyn Weaver / Andrew Poje
- Previous: 2015 Canadian Championships
- Next: 2017 Canadian Championships

The 2016 Canadian Tire National Skating Championships were held January 18–24, 2016 in Halifax, Nova Scotia. Organized by Skate Canada and sponsored by Canadian Tire, the event determined the national champions of Canada. Medals were awarded in the disciplines of men's singles, women's singles, pair skating, and ice dancing on the senior, junior, and novice levels. Although the official International Skating Union terminology for female skaters in the singles category is ladies, Skate Canada uses women officially. The results of this competition were among the selection criteria for the 2016 World Championships, 2016 Four Continents Championships, and the 2016 World Junior Championships.

Halifax was named as the host in May 2015. Competitors qualified at the Skate Canada Challenge, held in December 2015, or earned a bye.

== Medal summary ==
=== Senior ===
Discipline	Gold	Silver	Bronze
Men	Patrick Chan	Liam Firus	Kevin Reynolds
Ladies	Alaine Chartrand	Gabrielle Daleman	Kaetlyn Osmond
Pairs	Meagan Duhamel / Eric Radford	Julianne Séguin / Charlie Bilodeau	Liubov Ilyushechkina / Dylan Moscovitch
Ice dancing	Kaitlyn Weaver / Andrew Poje	Piper Gilles / Paul Poirier	Élisabeth Paradis / François-Xavier Ouellette

=== Junior ===
Discipline	Gold	Silver	Bronze
Men	Joseph Phan	Edrian Paul Celestino	Christian Reekie
Ladies	Sarah Tamura	Alicia Pineault	Megan Yim
Pairs	Hope McLean / Trennt Michaud	Bryn Hoffman / Bryce Chudak	Allison Eby / Brett Varley
Ice dancing	Mackenzie Bent / Dmitre Razgulajevs	Marjorie Lajoie / Zachary Lagha	Melinda Meng / Andrew Meng

=== Novice ===
Discipline	Gold	Silver	Bronze
Men	Stephen Gogolev	Matthew Markell	Bruce Waddell
Ladies	Aurora Cotop	Olivia Gran	Natalie D'Alessandro
Pairs	Jamie Knoblauch / Cody Wong	Katrina Lopez / Kurtis Schreiber	Hannah Dawson / Daniel Villeneuve
Ice dancing	Olivia Han / Grayson Lochhead	Alicia Fabbri / Claudio Pietrantonio	Irina Galiyanova / Tommy Tang

== Senior results ==
=== Men ===
Rank	Name	Section	Total points	SP		FS	
1	Patrick Chan	CO	295.67	1	103.58	1	192.09
2	Liam Firus	BC/YK	237.20	2	78.87	3	158.33
3	Kevin Reynolds	BC/YK	236.18	3	77.65	2	158.53
4	Nam Nguyen	CO	227.69	5	76.04	4	151.65
5	Nicolas Nadeau	QC	226.56	6	75.22	5	151.34
6	Keegan Messing	AB/NT/NU	221.50	4	77.20	6	144.30
7	Elladj Baldé	QC	210.01	7	69.02	7	140.99
8	Bennet Toman	CO	207.89	8	67.90	9	139.99
9	Roman Sadovsky	CO	204.59	9	64.17	8	140.42
10	Anthony Kan	CO	177.48	11	58.18	10	119.30
11	Christophe Belley	QC	175.77	12	58.17	12	117.60
12	Shaquille Davis	CO	174.33	10	61.81	14	112.52
13	Mitchell Gordon	BC/YK	173.64	14	54.72	11	118.92
14	Dustin Sherriff-Clayton	AB/NT/NU	168.76	16	54.29	13	114.47
15	Laurent Guay	QC	165.37	15	54.69	15	110.68
16	Jack Kermezian	QC	155.06	18	52.93	16	102.13
17	Samuel Angers	QC	147.33	17	53.12	17	94.21
18	Daniel-Olivier Boulanger-Trottier	QC	143.25	13	56.96	18	86.29

=== Women ===
Rank	Name	Section	Total points	SP		FS	
1	Alaine Chartrand	EO	201.99	2	68.81	2	133.18
2	Gabrielle Daleman	CO	197.99	3	64.44	1	133.55
3	Kaetlyn Osmond	AB/NT/NU	197.87	1	70.63	3	127.27
4	Véronik Mallet	QC	171.86	4	60.01	4	111.85
5	Michelle Long	CO	154.28	9	49.90	5	104.38
6	Larkyn Austman	BC/YK	152.87	5	53.87	6	99.00
7	Roxanne Rheault	QC	148.51	6	51.34	7	97.17
8	Eri Nishimura	CO	137.76	7	51.08	8	86.68
9	Kim DeGuise Léveillée	QC	133.86	8	50.88	9	82.98
10	Kelsey Wong	BC/YK	131.99	10	49.02	10	82.97
11	Jane Gray	AB/NT/NU	124.55	11	48.01	14	76.54
12	Valérie Bergeron	QC	123.76	15	45.87	13	77.89
13	Emma Cullen	EO	121.82	13	46.76	15	75.06
14	Véronique Cloutier	NO	120.80	17	41.53	11	79.27
15	Stephie Walmsley	NS	120.62	16	42.35	12	78.27
16	Selena Zhao	QC	118.43	12	47.76	16	70.67
17	Justine Belzile	QC	116.51	14	46.73	17	69.78
18	Valérie Giroux	QC	107.62	18	38.49	18	69.13

=== Pairs ===
Rank	Name	Section	Total points	SP		FS	
1	Meagan Duhamel / Eric Radford	QC	221.75	1	73.03	1	148.72
2	Julianne Séguin / Charlie Bilodeau	QC	211.40	2	69.73	2	141.67
3	Liubov Ilyushechkina / Dylan Moscovitch	CO	204.22	3	69.50	3	134.72
4	Kirsten Moore-Towers / Michael Marinaro	WO	183.58	4	59.67	4	123.91
5	Vanessa Grenier / Maxime Deschamps	QC	171.51	5	59.44	5	112.07
6	Brittany Jones / Joshua Reagan	WO	163.23	6	56.12	6	107.11
7	Shalena Rau / Sebastian Arcieri	WO	159.75	7	53.37	7	106.38
8	Hayleigh Bell / Rudi Swiegers	SK	140.23	8	41.35	8	98.88

=== Ice dancing ===
Rank	Name	Section	Total points	SP		FS	
1	Kaitlyn Weaver / Andrew Poje	NO	191.73	1	76.20	1	115.53
2	Piper Gilles / Paul Poirier	CO	179.82	2	70.63	2	109.19
3	Élisabeth Paradis / François-Xavier Ouellette	QC	165.83	4	63.03	3	102.80
4	Alexandra Paul / Mitchell Islam	CO	165.61	3	68.30	4	97.31
5	Nicole Orford / Asher Hill	BC/YK	156.37	5	61.46	5	94.91
6	Andréanne Poulin / Marc-André Servant	QC	146.33	7	55.62	6	90.71
7	Brianna Delmaestro / Timothy Lum	BC/YK	145.67	6	57.60	7	88.07
8	Carolane Soucisse / Simon Tanguay	QC	141.12	10	53.19	8	87.93
9	Catherine Daigle-Roy / Dominic Barthe	QC	137.71	9	54.09	9	83.62
10	Lauren Collins / Shane Firus	CO	135.52	8	54.67	10	80.85
11	Roxette Howe / Jean Luc Jackson	BC/YK	118.65	11	46.31	11	72.34
12	Alexa Linden / Addison Voldeng	SK	108.33	13	36.73	12	71.60
13	Jocelyn LeBlanc / Danny Seymour	CO	103.55	12	40.52	13	63.03
14	Elysia-Marie Campbell / Philippe Granger	OC	94.81	14	33.54	14	61.27

== Junior results ==
=== Men ===
Rank	Name	Section	Total points	SP		FS	
1	Joseph Phan	QC	189.30	1	60.13	1	129.17
2	Edrian Paul Celestino	QC	179.92	2	56.27	2	123.17
3	Christian Reekie	EO	164.65	3	54.25	4	110.40
4	Olivier Bergeron	QC	164.10	8	47.78	3	116.32
5	Conrad Orzel	CO	153.93	4	51.44	6	102.49
6	Zoé Duval Yergeau	QC	152.01	5	51.41	7	106.13
7	Eric Liu	AB/NT/NU	151.33	12	45.20	5	98.66
8	Gabriel St-Jean	QC	149.31	6	50.65	8	98.66
9	Alexander Lawrence	BC/YK	146.33	7	48.34	9	97.99
10	Josh Allen	EO	139.67	15	44.35	10	95.32
11	Trennt Michaud	EO	137.73	13	45.06	11	92.67
12	Jérémie Crevaux	QC	136.77	11	45.20	12	91.57
13	Grayson Rosen	AB/NT/NU	130.91	9	46.99	14	82.63
14	Thierry Ferland	QC	127.61	14	44.98	15	82.63
15	Kurtis Schreiber	AB/NT/NU	127.22	10	46.71	16	80.51
16	Cameron Hines	EO	125.81	16	40.88	13	84.93
17	Zachary Daleman	CO	116.08	17	39.37	17	76.71
18	Yi Zhou	WO	109.46	18	35.35	18	74.11

=== Women ===
Rank	Name	Section	Total points	SP		FS	
1	Sarah Tamura	BC/YK	155.20	1	52.48	1	102.72
2	Alicia Pineault	QC	137.83	5	47.31	3	90.52
3	Megan Yim	BC/YK	134.48	10	45.30	5	89.18
4	Sarah-Maude Blanchard	QC	134.11	11	44.59	4	89.52
5	Amanda Tobin	WO	133.63	13	39.84	2	93.79
6	Rachel Pettitt	BC/YK	127.95	3	48.87	7	79.08
7	Mckenna Colthorp	BC/YK	127.82	8	46.17	6	81.65
8	Alexis Dion	EO	126.52	2	51.17	8	75.35
9	Triena Robinson	AB/NT/NU	122.35	6	47.05	9	75.30
10	Kim Decelles	QC	121.43	7	46.52	10	74.91
11	Lily Markovski	CO	113.37	4	47.33	16	66.04
12	Sandrine Desrosiers	QC	113.00	9	45.66	14	67.34
13	Aislinn Ganci	AB/NT/NU	110.82	15	38.66	11	72.16
14	Tilyna Pawer	BC/YK	108.25	14	39.39	13	68.86
15	Marjorie Comtois	QC	107.15	18	35.70	12	71.45
16	Taia Steward	NO	105.14	16	38.16	15	66.98
17	Victoria Oliver	CO	98.62	12	43.38	17	55.24
18	Nicole Joe	AB/NT/NU	90.75	17	37.24	18	53.51

=== Pairs ===
Rank	Name	Section	Total points	SP		FS	
1	Hope McLean / Trennt Michaud	EO	154.45	1	54.30	1	100.15
2	Bryn Hoffman / Bryce Chudak	AB/NT/NU	139.15	2	51.25	2	87.90
3	Allison Eby / Brett Varley	WO	136.01	3	50.71	3	85.30
4	Justine Brasseur / Mathieu Ostiguy	QC	130.03	4	46.47	4	83.56
5	Olivia Boys-Eddy / Mackenzie Boys-Eddy	CO	128.31	5	46.40	6	81.91
6	Lori-Ann Matte / Thierry Ferland	QC	128.23	6	45.50	5	82.73
7	Keelee Gingrich / Davin Portz	AB/NT/NU	117.61	7	38.63	7	78.98
8	Naomie Boudreau / Cédric Savard	QC	96.64	8	37.39	8	59.25
9	Cassandra Leung / Richard Beauchesne	CO	92.48	9	29.64	9	62.84
WD	Sarah-Jade Latulippe / Alex Leak	QC					
WD	Nicki Nagy / Dustin Sherriff-Clayton	SK					

=== Ice dancing ===
Rank	Name	Section	Total points	SP		FS	
1	Mackenzie Bent / Dmitre Razgulajevs	EO	145.31	1	57.71	1	87.60
2	Marjorie Lajoie / Zachary Lagha	QC	141.23	4	56.29	2	84.94
3	Melinda Meng / Andrew Meng	QC	139.12	2	57.17	3	81.95
4	Haley Sales / Nikolas Wamsteeker	BC/YK	134.73	3	56.47	4	78.26
5	Payten Howland / Simon-Pierre Malette-Paquette	QC	132.32	5	55.35	5	76.97
6	Ellie Fisher / Parker Brown	CO	121.06	7	47.87	7	73.19
7	Valerie Taillefer / Jason Chan	QC	119.17	8	47.26	8	71.91
8	Danielle Wu / Nik Mirzakhani	BC/YK	118.96	12	43.71	6	75.25
9	Kayla Charky / Simon Dazé	QC	116.76	6	48.41	11	68.35
10	Gina Cipriano / Bradley Keeping-Myra	NS	116.20	9	46.70	10	69.50
11	Audrey Croteau-Villeneuve / Jeff Hough	EO	114.96	11	44.57	9	70.39
12	Ashlynne Stairs / Lee Royer	BC/YK	113.93	10	45.74	12	68.19
13	Mira Samoisette / Alexander Seidel	QC	98.67	14	38.01	13	60.66
14	Victoria Oliver / George Waddell	CO	97.26	13	40.48	14	56.78
15	Sara Marier / Jeffrey Wong	QC	89.81	15	36.91	15	52.90

== Novice results ==
=== Men ===
Rank	Name	Section	Total points	SP		FS	
1	Stephen Gogolev	CO	142.30	1	46.02	1	96.28
2	Matthew Markell	EO	120.25	2	42.93	2	77.32
3	Bruce Waddell	CO	106.91	7	36.20	5	70.71
4	Iliya Kovler	CO	106.41	8	34.95	3	71.46
5	Corey Circelli	CO	103.80	11	33.86	6	69.94
6	Brian Le	BC/YK	103.78	5	37.13	8	66.65
7	Alistair Lam	WO	103.64	14	32.29	4	71.35
8	Jack Dushenski	CO	102.15	13	32.35	7	69.80
9	Benjam Papp	BC/YK	97.09	12	33.11	9	63.98
10	Bryan Pierro	QC	96.76	6	36.62	14	60.14
11	Hugo Li	CO	95.64	15	32.27	10	63.37
12	James Henri-Singh	QC	95.00	9	34.72	13	60.28
13	Loucas Ethier	QC	94.51	10	33.90	12	60.61
14	Philipp Mule	QC	91.45	3	37.73	16	53.72
15	Matthew Wright	WO	89.26	4	37.33	17	51.93
16	Gabriel Blumenthal	BC/YK	88.01	17	29.90	15	58.11
17	Graham Schaufele	AB/NT/NU	86.95	18	25.66	11	61.29
18	Justin Brandon Ng-Siva	CO	78.05	16	31.68	18	46.37
WD	Samuel Turcotte	QC					

=== Women ===
Rank	Name	Section	Total points	SP		FS	
1	Aurora Cotop	CO	123.85	2	42.68	1	81.17
2	Olivia Gran	BC/YK	121.84	1	45.57	4	76.27
3	Natalie D'Alessandro	CO	117.56	8	38.74	2	78.82
4	Hannah Dawson	EO	116.70	6	39.17	3	77.53
5	Caroline Tremblay	QC	115.06	4	40.48	5	74.58
6	Maya Lappin	CO	109.81	5	39.32	7	70.49
7	Emily Bausback	BC/YK	106.58	14	33.19	6	73.39
8	Béatrice Lavoie-Léonard	QC	106.13	3	40.54	12	65.59
9	Isabella Mancini	WO	105.22	9	38.30	10	66.92
10	Evelyn Walsh	WO	104.71	12	35.48	8	69.23
11	Lissa Anne McGaghey	NB	104.46	11	36.84	9	67.62
12	Cara Pekos	CO	103.71	7	39.00	13	64.71
13	Alison Schumacher	WO	97.38	16	30.49	11	66.89
14	Emma Bulawka	AB/NT/NU	95.29	13	34.82	15	60.47
15	Olivia Farrow	WO	92.60	10	36.84	16	55.76
16	Julia LaBella	CO	88.93	18	27.80	14	61.13
17	Maélie Gilbert	QC	84.88	15	31.41	18	53.47
18	Alanna Liu	SK	82.14	17	28.62	17	53.52
WD	Danica Vangsgaard	BC/YK					
WD	Nicki Nagy	SK					

=== Pairs ===
Rank	Name	Section	Total points	SP		FS	
1	Jamie Knoblauch / Cody Wong	WO	119.90	1	40.90	1	79.00
2	Katrina Lopez / Kurtis Schreiber	AB/NT/NU	104.81	4	34.96	2	69.85
3	Hannah Dawson / Daniel Villeneuve	EO	103.50	2	38.33	3	65.17
4	Tessa Jones / Matthew den Boer	BC/YK	99.02	5	33.85	4	65.17
5	Marjolaine Ouimet / Benjamin Mimar	QC	98.20	3	36.29	5	61.91
6	Mackenzie Ripley / Nathan O'Brien	WO	93.62	7	32.14	6	61.48
7	Chloe Panetta / Steven Lapointe	QC	92.31	6	33.02	7	59.29
8	Léa Savoie / Pier-Alexandre Hudon	QC	87.75	8	31.68	8	56.07
9	Sarah Kedves / Lucas Pallard	BC/YK	71.47	9	25.38	9	46.09

=== Ice dancing ===
Rank	Name	Section	Total points	PD1		PD2		FD	
1	Olivia Han / Grayson Lochhead	WO	90.26	2	15.46	2	14.13	2	60.67
2	Alicia Fabbri / Claudio Pietrantonio	QC	89.22	5	12.89	4	13.67	1	62.66
3	Irina Galiyanova / Tommy Tang	CO	87.50	1	15.86	1	15.14	3	56.50
4	Ravie Cunningham / Cedar Bridgewood	BC/YK	79.80	3	13.05	8	12.00	4	54.75
5	Katerina Kasatkin / Corey Circelli	CO	78.19	6	12.33	9	11.14	5	54.72
6	Cassidy McFarlane / Kyle Cayouette	QC	77.31	10	11.56	6	12.43	6	53.32
7	Natascha Collier / Malcolm Kowan	AB/NT/NU	75.37	4	12.94	7	12.17	10	50.26
8	Talia Rancourt / Alex Gunther	EO	75.27	8	11.95	11	10.50	7	52.82
9	Janine Rho / Vali Baimoukhametov	AB/NT/NU	74.98	9	11.69	3	13.76	11	49.53
10	Yohanna Broker / Matthew Korkoian	WO	72.05	11	11.28	14	9.85	8	50.92
11	Charlotte Lafond-Fournier / Anthony Campanell	QC	72.04	12	11.14	10	10.60	9	50.30
12	Jade McCue / Gabriel Clemente	CO	68.65	7	12.16	5	12.81	12	43.68
13	Kara Hogg / Andrew McDonald	WO	62.54	13	10.03	12	10.43	14	42.08
14	Jessica-Lee Behiel / Jackson Behiel	AB/NT/NU	62.37	14	8.88	13	10.34	13	43.15
15	Alessia Hart-Lewis / Jacob Richmond	QC	52.73	15	8.24	15	8.08	15	36.41

== International team selections ==
=== World Championships ===
The team for the 2016 World Championships was announced on January 24, 2016. On March 11, 2016, it was announced that Julianne Séguin / Charlie Bilodeau and Liam Firus withdrew and were to be replaced by Kirsten Moore-Towers / Michael Marinaro and Nam Nguyen.

	Men	Women	Pairs	Ice dance
1	Patrick Chan	Alaine Chartrand	Meagan Duhamel / Eric Radford	Kaitlyn Weaver / Andrew Poje
2	~~Liam Firus~~	Gabrielle Daleman	~~Julianne Séguin / Charlie Bilodeau~~	Piper Gilles / Paul Poirier
3			Liubov Ilyushechkina / Dylan Moscovitch	Élisabeth Paradis / François-Xavier Ouellette
1st alt.	Nam Nguyen (added)		Kirsten Moore-Towers / Michael Marinaro (added)	

=== Four Continents Championships ===
The team for the 2016 Four Continents Championships was announced on January 24, 2016.

	Men	Women	Pairs	Ice dance
1	Patrick Chan	Alaine Chartrand	Meagan Duhamel / Eric Radford	Kaitlyn Weaver / Andrew Poje
2	Liam Firus	Gabrielle Daleman	Julianne Séguin / Charlie Bilodeau	Piper Gilles / Paul Poirier
3	Kevin Reynolds	Kaetlyn Osmond	Liubov Ilyushechkina / Dylan Moscovitch	Élisabeth Paradis / François-Xavier Ouellette
1st alt.	Nam Nguyen	Véronik Mallet	Kirsten Moore-Towers / Michael Marinaro	Alexandra Paul / Mitchell Islam
2nd alt.	Nicolas Nadeau	Kim DeGuise Léveillée	Vanessa Grenier / Maxime Deschamps	Nicole Orford / Asher Hill
3rd alt.	Keegan Messing	Selena Zhao	Brittany Jones / Joshua Reagan	Andréanne Poulin / Marc-André Servant

=== World Junior Championships ===
The team for the 2016 World Junior Championships was announced on January 24, 2016.

	Men	Women	Pairs	Ice dance
1	Nicolas Nadeau	Sarah Tamura	Hope McLean / Trennt Michaud	Mackenzie Bent / Dmitre Razgulajevs
2			Bryn Hoffman / Bryce Chudak	Marjorie Lajoie / Zachary Lagha
3			Justine Brasseur / Mathieu Ostiguy	Melinda Meng / Andrew Meng
