= Lorraine McNamara =

American ice dancer (born 1999)

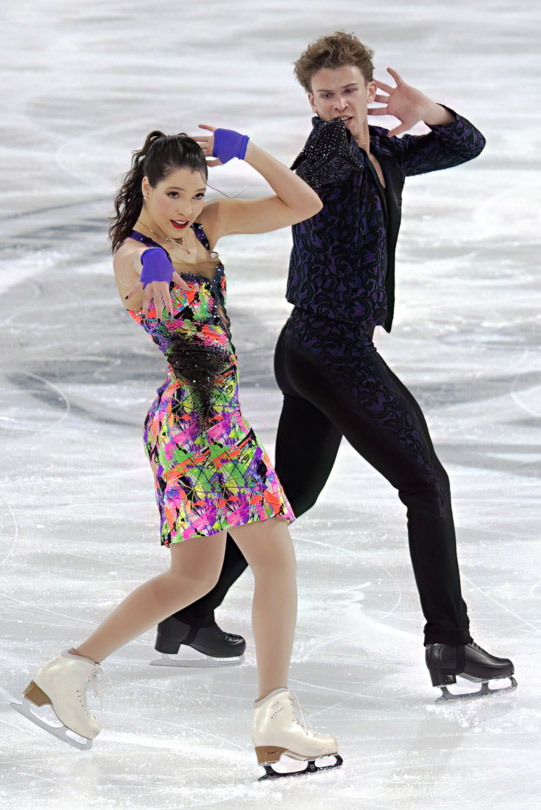
- McNamara and Spiridonov at the 2023 Grand Prix de France

Personal information
- Born: February 18, 1999 (age 27) Washington, D.C., U.S.
- Home town: Germantown, Maryland, U.S.
- Height: 5 ft 6 in (1.68 m)

Figure skating career
- Country: United States
- Discipline: Ice dance
- Coach: Alexei Kiliakov; Elena Novak
- Skating club: Peninsula Figure Skating Club, San Jose
- Began skating: 2002
World Junior Championships
Gold medal – first place	2016 Debrecen	Ice dance
Silver medal – second place	2015 Tallinn	Ice dance
Junior Grand Prix Final
Gold medal – first place	2015–16 Barcelona	Ice dance
Bronze medal – third place	2013–14 Fukuoka	Ice dance
Bronze medal – third place	2016–17 Marseille	Ice dance

Lorraine McNamara (born February 18, 1999) is an American ice dancer. With her skating partner, Anton Spiridonov, she is the 2023 World University Games silver medalist and 2022 CS U.S. Classic bronze medalist.

With her former partner, Quinn Carpenter, she is the 2018 Grand Prix of Helsinki bronze medalist, a three-time silver medalist on the ISU Challenger Series, and the 2019 U.S. national pewter medalist. Earlier in their career, they became the 2016 World Junior champions, the 2015 JGP Final champions, and two-time U.S. national junior champions.

== Personal life ==
Lorraine McNamara was born February 18, 1999, in Washington, D.C. She has four brothers and one sister. She attended Connelly School of the Holy Child in Potomac, Maryland.

== Career ==
On the ice from age two and a half, McNamara began training under Elena Novak and Alexei Kiliakov at the Wheaton Ice Dance Academy as a young child. She teamed up with her first ice dancing partner when she was six and skated with him for five months.

McNamara began skating with Quinn Carpenter in 2005. They won the junior bronze medal at the 2012 U.S. Championships, but McNamara was too young to be sent to the 2012 World Junior Championships.

=== 2012–2013 season ===
McNamara/Carpenter became age-eligible for junior internationals. In August 2012, they finished sixth in their Junior Grand Prix (JGP) debut in Courchevel, France. They placed fourth the following month at their second JGP assignment in Istanbul, Turkey. After winning the junior bronze medal at the U.S. Championships, McNamara/Carpenter were assigned to the World Junior Championships in Milan. They placed 8th in the short dance, 11th in the free dance, and 9th overall in Italy.

=== 2013–2014 season ===
McNamara/Carpenter won their first international medals during the 2013–14 JGP series, taking silver in Riga, Latvia, and then gold in Minsk, Belarus. Their results qualified them to the JGP Final in Fukuoka, Japan, where they won the bronze medal. The duo won the junior silver medal at the 2014 U.S. Championships and finished fourth at the 2014 World Junior Championships in Sofia, Bulgaria, after placing third in the short dance and fifth in the free dance.

=== 2014–2015 season ===
In the 2014–15 JGP series, McNamara/Carpenter won bronze in Ostrava, Czech Republic, and silver in Dresden, Germany, finishing as second alternates for the JGP Final. In January 2015, they won the junior titles at the Toruń Cup and then at the 2015 U.S. National Championships. In March, they were awarded the silver medal at the 2015 World Junior Championships in Tallinn, Estonia. Third in both segments, they finished second overall to Russia's Anna Yanovskaya / Sergey Mozgov by a margin of 9.09 points and ahead of Ukraine's Oleksandra Nazarova / Maxim Nikitin by 0.82.

=== 2015–2016 season ===
McNamara/Carpenter won gold at both of their 2015–16 JGP assignments, in Colorado Springs, Colorado, and Toruń, Poland. In December 2015, they were awarded gold at the 2015–16 JGP Final, outscoring silver medalists Alla Loboda / Pavel Drozd by over eight points. In January 2016, they won their second national junior title, finishing ahead of Rachel Parsons / Michael Parsons by 4.58 points. In March, they competed at the World Junior Championships in Debrecen, Hungary. Ranked second in the short dance and first in the free dance, McNamara/Carpenter won the gold medal by a margin of 0.91 over the Parsons.

=== 2016–2017 season ===
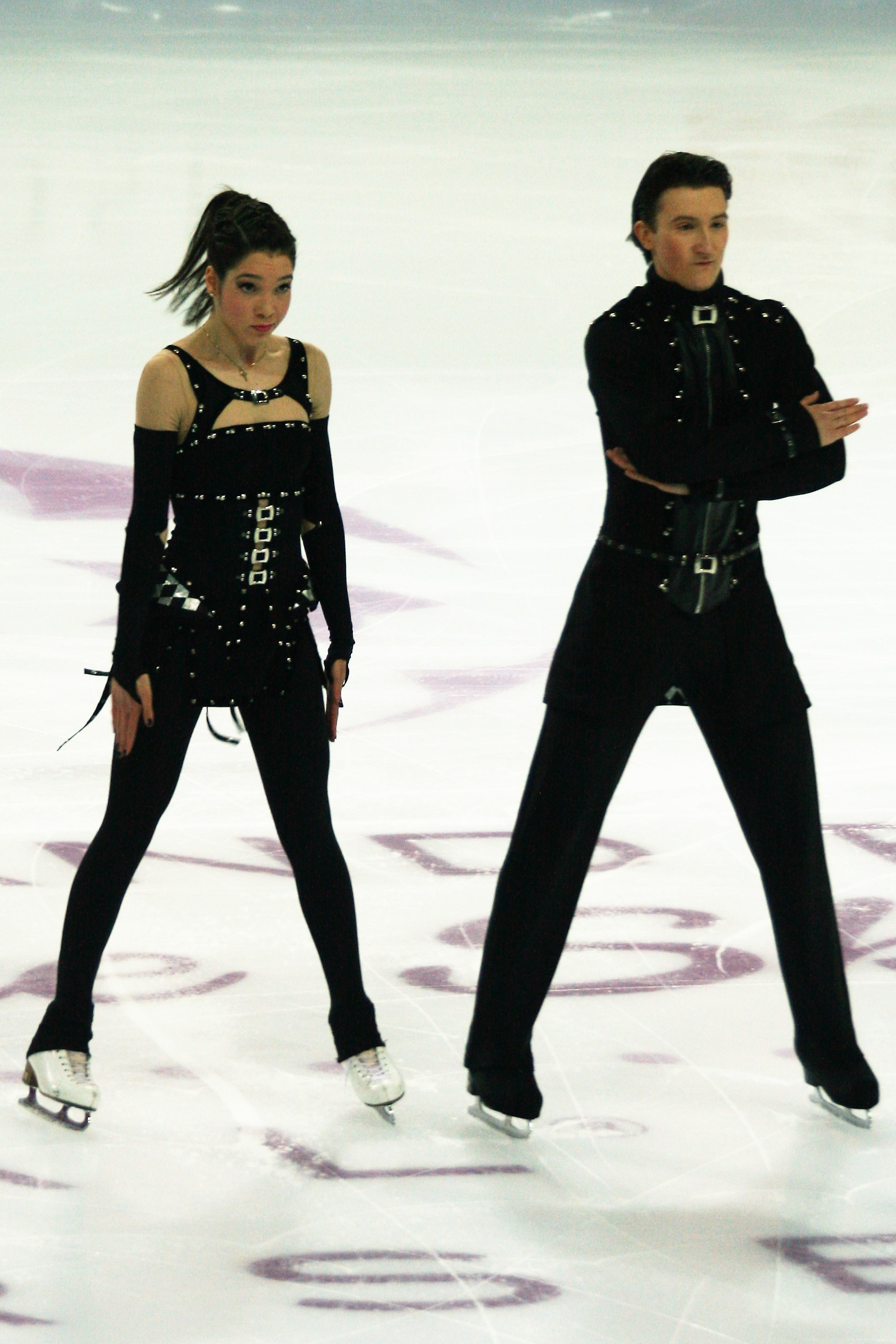
McNamara and Carpenter at the 2016–17 JGP Final

In their final season on the junior level, McNamara/Carpenter won gold in both of their 2016-17 JGP assignments in Ljubljana, Slovenia and Ostrava, Czech Republic. They finished third at the 2016-17 Junior Grand Prix Final. They also finished third at the 2017 U.S. National Championships.

Competing in what would be their final Junior World Championships, they placed seventh in the short dance after receiving only a Level 1 on their step sequence. Carpenter had trouble with her twizzles in the free dance, placing them sixth in that segment and remaining in seventh place overall.

=== 2017–2018 season ===
Making their senior international debut, McNamara/Carpenter won the Lake Placid Ice Dance International. Initially assigned to two Challenger series events, they placed fifth at the 2017 CS Autumn Classic International and eighth at the 2017 CS Finlandia Trophy. They then made their Grand Prix debut, placing fifth at the 2017 Cup of China. Reflecting on the transition to the senior ranks, Carpenter remarked, "we knew we didn't have anything to lose, so we threw out our very best. We will use the experience of getting here and build off of it." Following the Grand Prix, they competed at a third Challenger and won the silver medal at the 2017 CS Warsaw Cup.

Competing as seniors domestically, they placed sixth at the 2018 U.S. Championships. As the top three American teams were assigned to the Olympic team, McNamara/Carpenter were sent to the 2018 Four Continents Championships in Taipei. McNamara/Carpenter placed fourth in Taipei, of which McNamara said, "I think it went exactly the way we wanted, two strong, clean skates. I think it’s a good debut for us."

=== 2018–2019 season ===
In their second senior season, McNamara/Carpenter began by repeating as champions at Lake Placid Ice Dance International. After winning the silver medal at their first Challenger, the 2018 CS Ondrej Nepela Trophy, they placed fourth at the 2018 Skate America, narrowly missing the podium behind Tiffany Zahorski / Jonathan Guerreiro after coming third in the free dance. At their second Grand Prix event of the season, they won the bronze medal at the 2018 Grand Prix of Helsinki despite two extended lift deductions in the free dance. McNamara called their first Grand Prix medal "something to be proud of." Afterward, they competed a second Challenger, the 2018 CS Inge Solar Memorial, where they again won the silver medal.

At their final event of the season, the 2019 U.S. Championships, McNamara/Carpenter placed fourth, earning the domestic pewter medal.

=== 2019–2020 season ===
Beginning the season again at the Lake Placid Ice Dance International, McNamara/Carpenter won the bronze medal. On the Challenger series, they won bronze at the 2019 CS Ondrej Nepela Memorial. Subsequently, an injury compelled them to withdraw from their first Grand Prix, the 2019 Internationaux de France. They were able to compete at their second Grand Prix, placing ninth at the 2019 NHK Trophy.

McNamara/Carpenter placed sixth at the 2020 U.S. Championships. This proved to be their final competitive appearance, as Carpenter announced his retirement from ice dance on April 16, 2020. McNamara said she would seek to continue skating with a new partner.

=== 2020–2021 season ===
The onset of the COVID-19 pandemic greatly complicated McNamara's search for a new partner, given the restrictions on both travel and the use of training facilities. Upon seeking to arrange a rink tryout with Anton Spiridonov in June 2020, she would later note that "phone calls needed to be made so it would be open just for us, and we needed to enter through the back door." On July 3, the two announced that they had formed a partnership.

McNamara/Spiridonov were assigned to make their Grand Prix debut at the 2020 Skate America, attended primarily by American skaters due to travel restrictions caused by the COVID-19 pandemic. They finished in sixth place. Making their debut at the U.S. national championships later that season, they were sixth as well there.

=== 2021–2022 season ===
McNamara/Spiridonov began the season at two American-based international competitions, the Lake Placid Ice Dance International and the 2021 U.S. Classic, finishing seventh and fifth, respectively. Making their debut on the Challenger series, they were tenth at the 2021 CS Cup of Austria.

At their second U.S. Championships, McNamara/Spiridonov finished in ninth.

=== 2022–2023 season ===
McNamara/Spiridonov entered their third season together with the personal goal of reaching the four-team podium at the national championships. After winning gold at the Ice Dance International, the team appeared at two Challenger events, winning the bronze at the 2022 CS U.S. Classic before coming fifth at the 2022 CS Nebelhorn Trophy. They also appeared at the Santa Claus Cup, winning a bronze medal.

In advance of the national championships, McNamara/Spiridonov were named to the American team for the 2023 Winter World University Games, held that year in Lake Placid. They won the rhythm dance, but in the free dance the French team Dupayage/Nabais overtook them, and McNamara/Spiridonov won the silver medal. They finished sixth at the 2023 U.S. Championships.

=== 2023–2024 season ===
McNamara/Spiridonov came fourth at the Lake Placid Ice Dance International, before finishing eighth at the 2023 CS Nebelhorn Trophy. On the Grand Prix, they were ninth at the 2023 Grand Prix de France. They went on to place eighth at the 2023 NHK Trophy.

== Programs ==
=== With Spiridonov ===
Season	Rhythm dance	Free dance	Exhibition
2023–2024	Kiss; Slow Love; Let's Go Crazy by Prince choreo. by Elena Novak, Jimmie Manners	Chalkboard; A Deal With Chaos; Camping by Jóhann Jóhannsson; Run by Ludovico Einaudi choreo. by Elena Novak, Jimmie Manners	
2022–2023	Rhumba: Careless Whisper by George Michael arr. by Hugo Chouinard choreo. by Elena Novak, Jimmie Manners	Rain, In Your Black Eyes by Ezio Bosso choreo. by Elena Novak, Jimmie Manners	Hot in Herre by Nelly; Hey Ya! by Outkast
2021–2022	Hip Hop: Hot in Herre by Nelly; Blues: No Diggity by Blackstreet; Hip Hop: Hey Ya! by Outkast choreo. by Jimmie Manners, Elena Novak, Alexei Kiliakov	The Phantom of the Opera by Andrew Lloyd Webber choreo. by Elena Novak, Alexei Kiliakov	
2020–2021	Quickstep: Big Spender; Swing: Rich Man's Frug (from Sweet Charity) by Cy Coleman choreo. by Elena Novak	Money; Shine On You Crazy Diamond; Money by Pink Floyd choreo. by Elena Novak	

=== With Carpenter ===
Season	Short dance	Free dance	Exhibition
2019–2020	Slow Foxtrot: It Was A Good Time (from Liza with a Z); Quickstep: Maybe This Time (from Cabaret) both performed by Liza Minnelli	Anime Contro Vendo by Medialuna Tango Project; Rescue by Lauren Daigle; No Boundaries by Adam Lambert	
2018–2019	Waltz: Desde el Alma; Tango: Quejumbroso by Orquesta Clor Tango de Roberto Alvarez	Porz Goret by Yann Tiersen; Mirror - Modern Piano by Piano; Penn Ar Roc'h by Yann Tiersen	
2017–2018	Rhumba: Mambo Italiano by Bob Merrill; Slow Rhumba: El Perdedor by Enrique Iglesias feat. Marco Antonio Solís; Samba: Big Bagz by Alex Romano	Anime Contro Vendo by Medialuna Tango Project	Crying in the Rain by A-ha
2016–2017	Hip hop: Vanguardian by Steed Lord; Blues: The Power by District 78 feat. Cheesa; Hip hop: Gaia by Claude Challe, Jean-Marc Challe	Thunder Struck; Nothing Else Matters; Rock Prelude performed by David Garrett	Disco Inferno by The Trammps with Parsons/Parsons
2015–2016	Peer Gynt by Edvard Grieg; Anitra's Dance; In the Hall of the Mountain King choreo. by Elena Novak, Alexei Kiliakov	Carmen by Georges Bizet; Changing of the Guard; Dance; Second Intermezzo; Scene choreo. by Elena Novak, Alexei Kiliakov	I Want It That Way by the Backstreet Boys
2014–2015	Heart of Africa by Nature Lounge Club	The Phantom of the Opera by Andrew Lloyd Webber; The Phantom of the Opera; The Music of the Night; The Phantom of the Opera	Beneath Your Beautiful by Labrinth ft. Emeli Sandé; Get Smart by Trevor Rabin
2013–2014	Bublitchki; Chiribim Chiribom performed by The Barry Sisters	Discombobulate (from Sherlock Holmes) by Hans Zimmer; The Godfather Waltz by Nino Rota; Discombobulate	Beneath Your Beautiful by Labrinth ft. Emeli Sandé
2012–2013	Ramalama Bang Bang by Róisín Murphy; Zombie Blues by Flipron; Ramalama Bang Bang by Róisín Murphy	Roméo et Juliette, de la Haine à l'Amour by Gerard Presgurvic; Le Balcon; Les Rois Du Monde	
2011–2012	Kaboom by Ursula 1000; Gabriel's Oboe by Ennio Morricone	The Four Seasons by Antonio Vivaldi performed by TechnoClassica	
2010–2011	Waltz: Tango:	Smile by Charlie Chaplin	
2009–2010		Boléro by Maurice Ravel	
2008–2009		Doll program	
2007–2008		Nobody Does It Better (from The Spy Who Loved Me) by Marvin Hamlisch; Soul Bossa Nova by Quincy Jones	
2006–2007		The Addams Family; Selections by Duke Ellington	

== Competitive highlights ==
=== Ice dance with Anton Spiridonov ===
- GP – Event of the ISU Grand Prix Series
- CS – Event of the ISU Challenger Series

Competition placements at senior level
Season	2020–21	2021–22	2022–23	2023–24
U.S. Championships	6th	9th	6th	
GP France				9th
GP NHK Trophy				8th
GP Skate America	6th		7th	
CS Cup of Austria		10th		
CS Nebelhorn Trophy			5th	8th
CS U.S. Classic		5th	3rd	
Lake Placid Ice Dance		7th	1st	4th
Santa Claus Cup			3rd	
World University Games			2nd	

=== Ice dance with Quinn Carpenter ===
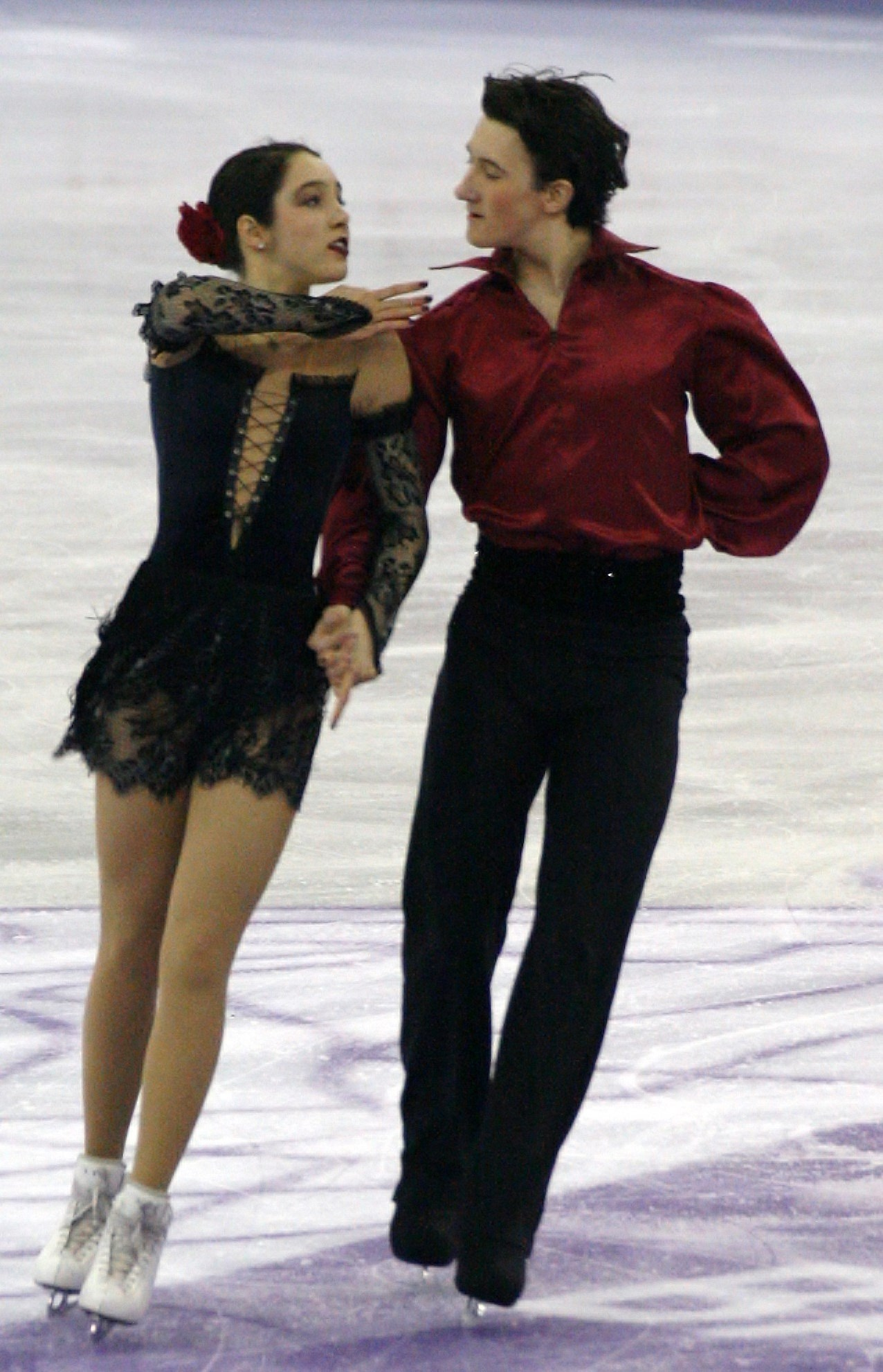
McNamara and Carpenter at the 2015−16 Junior Grand Prix Final

- GP – Event of the ISU Grand Prix Series
- JGP – Event of the ISU Junior Grand Prix Series
- CS – Event of the ISU Challenger Series

Competition placements at senior level
Season	2017–18	2018–19	2019–20
Four Continents Championships	4th		
U.S. Championships	6th	4th	6th
GP Cup of China	5th		
GP Finland		3rd	
GP NHK Trophy			9th
GP Skate America		4th	
CS Alpen Trophy		2nd	
CS Autumn Classic	5th		
CS Finlandia Trophy	8th		
CS Golden Spin of Zagreb			4th
CS Nepela Memorial		2nd	3rd
CS Warsaw Cup	2nd		
Lake Placid Ice Dance	1st	1st	3rd

Competition placements at junior level
Season	2010–11	2011–12	2012–13	2013–14	2014–15	2015–16	2016–17
World Junior Championships			9th	4th	2nd	1st	7th
JGP Final				3rd		1st	3rd
U.S. Championships	9th	3rd	3rd	2nd	1st	1st	3rd
JGP Belarus				1st			
JGP Czech Republic					3rd		1st
JGP France			6th				
JGP Germany					2nd		
JGP Latvia				2nd			
JGP Poland						1st	
JGP Slovenia							1st
JGP Turkey			4th				
JGP United States						1st	
Toruń Cup					1st		

== Detailed results ==
=== Ice dance with Anton Spiridonov ===
ISU personal best scores in the +5/-5 GOE System
Segment	Type	Score	Event
Total	TSS	179.03	2022 CS U.S. International Classic
Short program	TSS	73.17	2022 CS U.S. International Classic
Short program	TES	41.98	2022 CS U.S. International Classic
Short program	PCS	31.19	2022 CS U.S. International Classic
Free skating	TSS	105.86	2022 CS U.S. International Classic
Free skating	TES	59.62	2023 CS Nebelhorn Trophy
Free skating	PCS	47.40	2022 CS U.S. International Classic

=== Ice dance with Quinn Carpenter ===
ISU personal best scores in the +5/-5 GOE System
Segment	Type	Score	Event
Total	TSS	183.47	2019 CS Nepela Memorial
Rhythm dance	TSS	78.39	2019 CS Golden Spin of Zagreb
Rhythm dance	TES	44.75	2019 CS Golden Spin of Zagreb
Rhythm dance	PCS	33.64	2019 CS Golden Spin of Zagreb
Free dance	TSS	109.87	2019 CS Nepela Memorial
Free dance	TES	60.09	2018 CS Ondrej Nepela Trophy
Free dance	PCS	50.04	2019 CS Nepela Memorial

ISU personal bests in the +3/-3 GOE System (from 2010–11)
Segment	Type	Score	Event
Total	TSS	163.65	2016 World Junior Championships
Short dance	TSS	66.60	2016 JGP Czech Republic
Short dance	TES	35.85	2015 JGP United States
Short dance	PCS	32.34	2016 JGP Czech Republic
Free dance	TSS	97.98	2017 CS Warsaw Cup
Free dance	TES	51.87	2018 Four Continents Championships
Free dance	PCS	49.81	2015 JGP Poland
