= Patrice Archetto =

Canadian pair skater

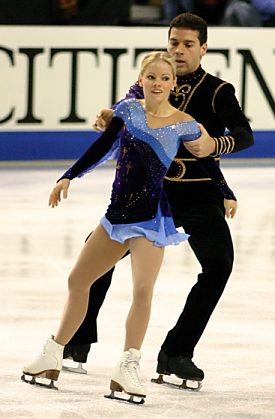
- Archetto competes with former partner Anabelle Langlois in 2004.

Personal information
- Born: December 3, 1972 (age 53) Montreal, Quebec
- Height: 1.78 m (5 ft 10 in)

Figure skating career
- Country: Canada
- Skating club: CPA Riviere des Prairies
- Began skating: 1977
- Retired: 2005
Medal record
Representing Canada
Pairs' Figure skating
Four Continents Championships
Silver medal – second place	2002 Jeonju	Pairs

Patrice Archetto (born December 3, 1972) is a Canadian former pair skater. With Anabelle Langlois, he is the 2002 Four Continents silver medallist.

== Career ==
Archetto teamed up with Anabelle Langlois in 1998. She fractured her skull as a result of a fall on a throw jump at the 1998 Canadian Championships. Langlois and Archetto won the silver medal at the 2002 Four Continents Championships, five Grand Prix medals, and five Canadian national medals. Jan Ullmark coached the pair in Edmonton. Their partnership ended when Archetto retired from competition in 2005.

== Programs ==
(with Langlois)

Season	Short program	Free skating
2004–2005	Romeo and Juliet by Nino Rota	Un homme et son péché by Michel Cusson
2003–2004	Leyenda performed by Vanessa-Mae	Lawrence of Arabia by Maurice Jarre
2002–2003	Harlem Nocturne by Duke Ellington	Tosca by Giacomo Puccini
2001–2002	Gypsy Earrings by Puerto Vallarat Squeeze; As Time Goes By; Trumpet Blues John Evans Orchestra	I Will Wait For You (from The Umbrellas of Cherbourg) by Michel Legrand Pittsburg Symphony Orchestra
2000–2001	Puerro Vallarra Squeeze by Wille and Lobo; Gypsy Earrings by Strunz and Farah	Capricco Italien Opus 45 by Pyotr Tchaikovsky

== Competitive highlights ==
GP: Grand Prix

=== With Langlois ===
International
Event	98–99	99–00	00–01	01–02	02–03	03–04	04–05
Olympics				12th			
Worlds				10th	5th	8th	
Four Continents			6th	2nd	4th	5th	
GP Final					6th	4th	
GP Lalique/Bompard						4th	WD
GP NHK Trophy				WD	3rd	2nd	
GP Skate Canada				3rd	3rd	4th	4th
GP Skate America					2nd		
National
Canadian Champ.	9th	6th	3rd	3rd	2nd	2nd	3rd
WD = Withdrew

=== With Luis ===
International
Event	1995–96
International St. Gervais	2nd
Nebelhorn Trophy	6th
National
Canadian Championships	9th
