= Madagascar: Escape 2 Africa (soundtrack) =

2008 film soundtrack album

Madagascar: Escape 2 Africa (Music from the Motion Picture)

Soundtrack album by Hans Zimmer and will.i.am
- Released: November 4, 2008
- Recorded: 2008
- Genres: Pop; classic rock; R&B
- Length: 49:33
- Labels: will.i.am; Interscope
- Producers: Hans Zimmer; will.i.am

Hans Zimmer chronology
The Dark Knight (2008)	Madagascar: Escape 2 Africa (2008)	Frost/Nixon (2009)

will.i.am chronology
The Black Eyed Peas Family Best (2008)	Madagascar: Escape 2 Africa (2008)	#willpower (2013)

Madagascar: Escape 2 Africa (Music from the Motion Picture) is the soundtrack album to the 2008 film Madagascar: Escape 2 Africa, the second installment in the Madagascar franchise. Released on November 4, 2008, by Interscope Records, the album featured original score written by Hans Zimmer, who collaborated with American rapper and singer will.i.am to produce the score and songs. will.i.am also wrote five new songs specifically for the film, while other incorporated songs were included in the film's soundtrack. The music received generally favorable critical response.

== Development ==
Hans Zimmer collaborated with American rapper and singer will.i.am to produce the score and songs for Escape 2 Africa. To record for the film, Zimmer and will.i.am, had travelled to Africa (where the film was set) for the musical ideas and teamed up with the African musicians on the album. In the process, they had written four songs together for the film. While writing the track "The Travelling Song", will.i.am felt that "It's about being stripped away from your home, and not knowing really where you come from. But wherever you are — because of your friends — that is your home now. Those lyrics really sum up my life, a black guy in a Mexican neighborhood, and apl.de.ap's life, being placed for adoption at 14 and coming to America not knowing English. We made it our home because of our friendship, and that's what 'Madagascar' is about." will.i.am also recorded his cover version of "I Like to Move It" in the end credits.

== Track listing ==
Madagascar: Escape 2 Africa - Music from the Motion Picture
No.	Title	Artist	Length
1.	"Once Upon a Time in Africa"	Hans Zimmer	3:44
2.	"The Traveling Song"	will.i.am	3:25
3.	"Party! Party! Party!"	Hans Zimmer	3:31
4.	"I Like to Move It"	will.i.am	3:41
5.	"The Good, The Bad and the Ugly (Polka Version)"	Hans Zimmer	0:54
6.	"Big and Chunky"	will.i.am	3:21
7.	"Chums"	Heitor Pereira	2:16
8.	"New York, New York (Polka Version)"	Hans Zimmer	1:30
9.	"Volcano"	Hans Zimmer	2:50
10.	"Rescue Me"	Hans Zimmer	3:36
11.	"More Than a Feeling"	Boston	4:45
12.	"She Loves Me"	will.i.am	1:45
13.	"Foofie"	Hans Zimmer	2:40
14.	"Copacabana (At the Copa)"	Barry Manilow	4:07
15.	"Monochromatic Friends"	Hans Zimmer	3:02
16.	"Best Friends"	will.i.am	2:26
17.	"Alex on the Spot"	Hans Zimmer	2:00
Total length:			31:27

Enhanced videos

No.	Title	Artist(s)	Length
1.	"I Like to Move It"	will.i.am	3:41
2.	"She Loves Me"	will.i.am	1:45
3.	"Big and Chunky (DVD only)"	will.i.am	3:21
Total length:			8:47

== Reception ==
Filmtracks.com wrote "Madagascar: Escape 2 Africa remains the best entry for the infectiously cute main escape theme. In an ideal world, the best score material from all three films would be combined into one rollicking album." Andrew Leahey of AllMusic wrote "The Madagascar series relies heavily on music, often injecting songs directly into the movies' plot lines, and that emphasis helps fine-tune this soundtrack into a lighthearted, pleasant album." In contrast, Jonathan Broxton gave a negative review, calling it as the "worst soundtrack written for any major animated film of recent years".

== Personnel ==
Credits adapted from AllMusic.

- Ryeland Allison – arranger
- Gretchen Anderson – producer
- Slamm Andrews – music editor, recording
- Lorne Balfe – additional music
- Chris Barrett – scoring engineer
- John Barrett – scoring engineer
- Becky Bentham – score coordinator
- Jeff "Bucko" Biggers – recording
- Thomas Broderick – technical engineer
- Julie Butchko – music clearance
- Dan Butler – music business affairs
- Carmen Carter – vocals
- Alvin Chea – vocals
- Al Clay – recording, vocals
- Jim Dooley – additional music
- Dylan Dresdow – mixing
- Fred Ebb – composer
- Jack Feldman – composer
- Mark Ford – choir conductor
- Geoff Foster – scoring recordist
- Gavin Greenaway – score conductor
- Isobel Griffiths – orchestra contractor
- Richard Harvey – woodwind
- Rand Hoffman – music business affairs
- Luis Jardim – percussion
- John Kander – composer
- Andrew Kawczynski –technical assistance
- Steven Kofsky – music production supervisor
- Kaita Lewin – recording
- Abie Lister – score assistance
- Barry Manilow – composer, vocals
- Craig Marshall – music business affairs
- Liz McNicoll – music business affairs
- Alan Meyerson – mixing
- Perry Montague-Mason – orchestra Leader
- Erick "More" Morillo – composer
- Ennio Morricone – composer
- Wendi Morris – score coordinator
- Phil Orescan – marketing
- Sunny Park – executive in charge of music
- Heitor Pereira – composer, vocals
- Lori Perry – vocals
- Sharon Perry – vocals
- Purcell Singers – choir/chorus
- Mark Quashie – composer
- Frank Ricotti – marimba
- Ryan Rubin – assistant music editor
- Czarina Russell – studio manager
- Jennifer Schiller – music coordinator
- Tom Scholz – composer
- Tony Seyler – music business affairs
- Jacob Shea – arranger
- Ken "Kaz" Smith – music soordinator
- Peter Oso Snell – technical engineer
- Bruce Sussman – composer
- Louie Teran – mastering
- Vin Villanueva – music coordinator
- Greg Vines – mixing assistant
- Matt Ward – recording
- Oren Waters – vocals
- Lucy Whalley – orchestra assembly
- Mark Wherry – digital processing
- will.i.am – composer, engineer, soundtrack producer, vocals
- Andrew Zack – score coordinator
- Geoff Zanelli – additional music
- Ianthe Zevos – creative consultant
- Hans Zimmer – composer, soundtrack producer

== Chart performance ==
Chart (2008)	Peak position
US Billboard 200	100
US Top Internet Albums (Billboard)	32
US Soundtrack Albums (Billboard)	18

== Certifications ==
Certifications for Madagascar: Escape 2 Africa
Region	Certification	Certified units/sales
United Kingdom (BPI)	Silver	60,000^{‡}
^{‡} Sales+streaming figures based on certification alone.
