= Frost/Nixon (soundtrack) =

2009 film soundtrack album

Frost/Nixon (Original Motion Picture Soundtrack)

Film score by Hans Zimmer
- Released: January 6, 2009
- Recorded: 2008
- Studios: Remote Control Productions, Santa Monica, California
- Genre: Film score
- Length: 43:20
- Label: Varèse Sarabande
- Producers: Hans Zimmer; Lorne Balfe

Hans Zimmer chronology
Madagascar: Escape 2 Africa (2008)	Frost/Nixon (2009)	Angels & Demons (2009)

Frost/Nixon (Original Motion Picture Soundtrack) is the film score composed and arranged by Hans Zimmer for the 2009 film Frost/Nixon directed by Ron Howard. The album featured 14 tracks, which were released through Varèse Sarabande record label on January 6, 2009, and was nominated for the Golden Globe Award for Best Original Score amongst other accolades.

== Background ==
Hans Zimmer previously worked with Howard on Backdraft (1991) and The Da Vinci Code (2006); Frost/Nixon is their third collaborative project they worked on together. Before the shooting began, both Zimmer and Howard started discussing about the film's music with producer Brian Grazer, music supervisor Kathy Nelson and editors Daniel P. Hanley and Mike Hill. Though the initial discussions revolved around the songs, as well as the story, staging, style of the scenes in the musical context, the team did not use any of the songs, but they provided a perspective of how the film is viewed.

Zimmer considered the film to be a tricky subject as it deciphered the Frost/Nixon interviews—basically with two non-likeable characters talking and the last thing is to manipulate the audience to sympathise for Richard Nixon. Zimmer tried to approach the stage play idea ino a film without losing the integrity, and opened up ideas for creating the space for music or silence, in a dialogue-driven film.

Eventually, Zimmer wrote the music before the production began, a different approach of film scoring he undertook, which he attributed to the change of technology. Zimmer provided musical pieces during the shooting that could make the team in sync with the pacing of the film, and spotting of music with Avid Technology also benefited them. Zimmer also created newer ideas at the last minute of edit, helping in the drastic shift of tonality.

== Reception ==
Jonathan Broxton of Movie Music UK said that "Listening to this score, one can easily envisage how Zimmer's music drives the narrative, giving the film enhanced internal dimensions". Broxton added that, a recurring criticism being "[his] music is essentially wallpaper, offering minimal commentary on the subtext of the film it accompanies" which was not the case with Frost/Nixon as "one could easily make the argument that, without Zimmer's management of the film's overarching tone, the end product could be little more than a filmed stage play, lacking any kind of cinematic scope". Reviewer based at Film Score Monthly wrote "The listening experience in the movie was serviceable, but on CD, it feels less disjointed and more enjoyable."

Thomas Glorieux of Maintitles wrote "In general it is a work that downright nails the atmosphere, supporting the quest for the truth." Filmtracks wrote "You indeed need to exercise patience when first listening to Frost/Nixon, because by its nature it establishes an ambient mood rather than a truly lasting impression. This is the best that any composer could have accomplished with this script, and it's especially satisfying to see Zimmer's name attached to it."

== Track listing ==
No.	Title	Length
1.	"Watergate"	4:27
2.	"The Numbers"	1:57
3.	"Hello, Good Evening and Welcome"	1:33
4.	"Pardon the Phlebitis"	1:42
5.	"Status"	4:04
6.	"Beverly Hilton"	2:27
7.	"Money"	2:49
8.	"Frost Despondent"	2:31
9.	"Insanely Risky"	2:50
10.	"Cambodia"	1:00
11.	"Research Montage"	3:05
12.	"The Final Interview"	2:19
13.	"Nixon Defeated"	2:40
14.	"First Ideas"	9:56
Total length:		43:20

== Personnel ==
Credits adapted from liner notes:

- Music composer – Hans Zimmer
- Music producer and arrangements – Hans Zimmer, Lorne Balfe
- Additional music – Lorne Balfe
- Featured cellist – Martin Tillman
- Compiler – Daniel Pinder
- Digital instrument design – Mark Wherry
- Technical engineer – Peter "Oso" Snell, Tom Broderick
- Assistant technical engineer – Katia Lewin
- Recording – Alan Meyerson, Lorne Balfe
- Mixing – Alan Meyerson
- Mastering – Patricia Sullivan Fourstar
- Music editor – Daniel Pinder
- Music supervisor – Kathy Nelson
- Stage manager – Czarina Russell
- Music production services – Steven Kofsky
- Technical assistance – Jacob Shea
- Score coordinator – Andrew Zack
- Executive producer – Robert Townson, Brian Grazer, Ron Howard
- Album direction for Universal Pictures – David Buntz
- Director of film scoring for Universal Pictures – Tiffany Jones
- Executive in charge of music for Universal Pictures – Harry Garfield, Kathy Nelson
- Music business affairs for Universal Pictures – Phil Cohen

== Accolades ==
Award	Date of ceremony	Category	Recipient(s)	Result	Ref.
Golden Globe Awards	January 11, 2009	Best Original Score	Hans Zimmer	Nominated	
World Soundtrack Awards	October 17, 2009	Soundtrack Composer of the Year	Hans Zimmer (Note: also for The Dark Knight (2008) and Angels & Demons (2009))	Nominated	
World Soundtrack Awards	October 17, 2009	Best Original Score of the Year	Hans Zimmer	Nominated	
