= Alisa Fedichkina =

Russian competitive figure skater (born 2002)

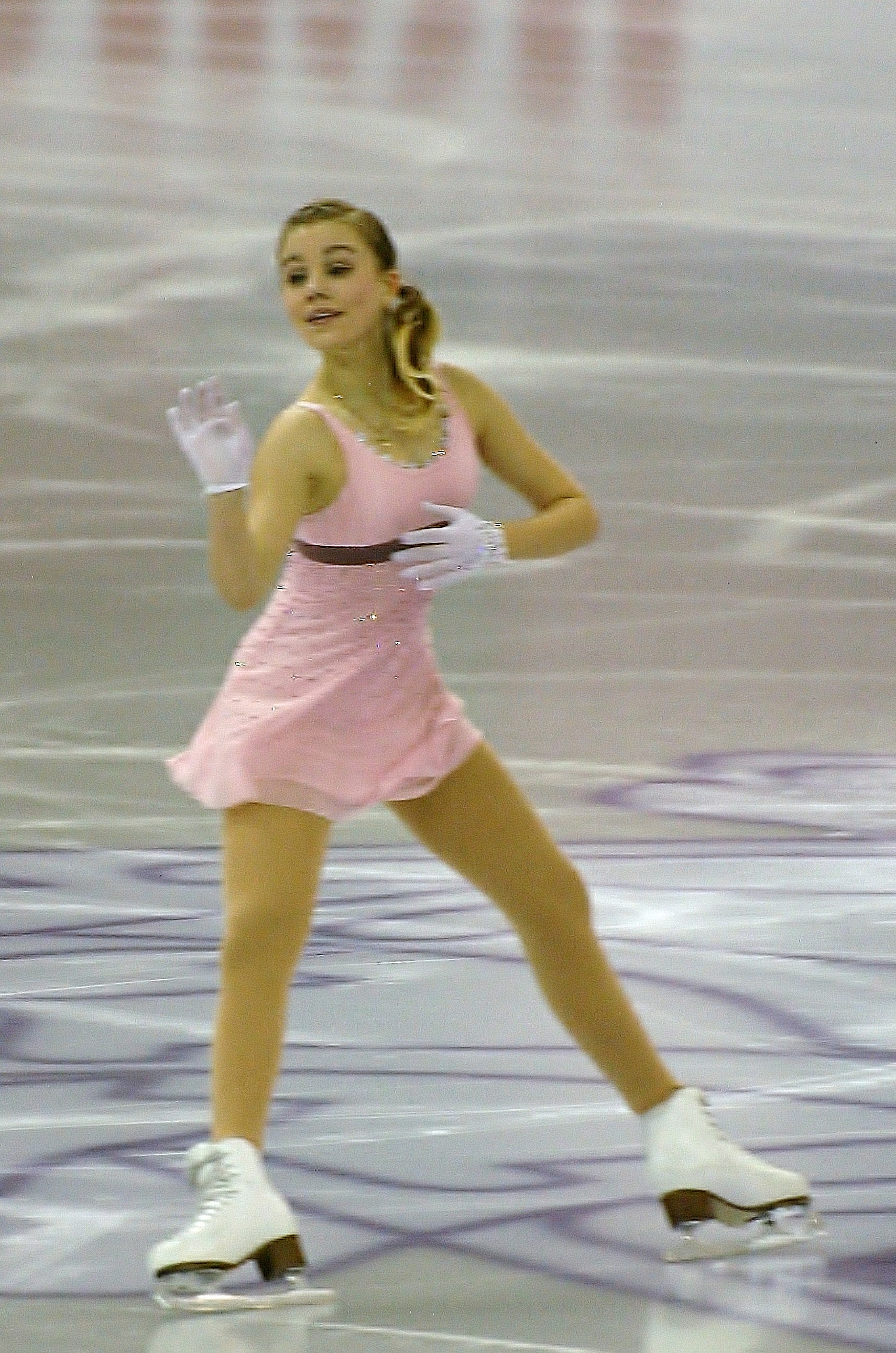
- Fedichkina in December 2015

Personal information
- Native name: Алиса Андреевна Федичкина
- Full name: Alisa Andreyevna Fedichkina
- Born: 14 February 2002 (age 24) Rostov-on-Don, Russia
- Height: 1.57 m (5 ft 2 in)

Figure skating career
- Country: Russia
- Coach: Alexei Mishin
- Skating club: Olympic School Saint Petersburg
- Began skating: 2006

Alisa Andreyevna Fedichkina (Russian: Алиса Андреевна Федичкина, FYEH-deech-kee-nah; born 14 February 2002) is a Russian competitive figure skater. She is the 2017 International Cup of Nice champion and has won two silver medals on the ISU Challenger Series. She received a small gold medal for her short program at the 2016 World Junior Championships.

== Personal life ==
Fedichkina was born on 14 February 2002 in Rostov-on-Don, Russia.

== Career ==
Fedichkina began skating in 2006 when she was 4 years old. In the 2014–15 season, she qualified for the first time to the Russian Junior Championships and finished 8th.

=== 2015–16 season ===
Fedichkina's international debut came in the 2015–16 season. Competing at her first Junior Grand Prix (JGP) assignment, she placed first in the short program, 5th in the free skate, and 4th overall at JGP Riga in August 2015. The following month, she won the silver medal at JGP Spain after ranking first in the short, second in the free, and obtaining a total score 0.42 less than Japan's Yuna Shiraiwa. Fedichkina's placements gave her the last qualifying spot for the 2015−16 JGP Final.

Competing on the junior level, Fedichkina won gold at the 2015 International Cup of Nice and silver at the 2015 Tallinn Trophy. She placed second in the short, fourth in the free, and fourth overall – 0.53 shy of the bronze medalist – at the 2015−16 JGP Final, held in December in Barcelona, Spain. Later that month, she made her senior national debut, placing 11th at the Russian Championships. In January, Fedichkina won the Russian junior national bronze medal behind Polina Tsurskaya and Maria Sotskova. In March, she was awarded a small gold medal for her short program result at the 2016 World Junior Championships in Debrecen, Hungary. She withdrew one hour before the free skate due to a sprained ankle she incurred in practice.

=== 2016–17 season ===
At the 2017 Russian Championships, Fedichkina placed 10th on the senior level and 6th at the junior event. During the season she won two international junior events, 2016 Cup of Nice and 2016 Tallinn Trophy.

=== 2017–18 season ===
In October, Fedichkina made her senior debut at the 2017 Cup of Nice where she won the gold medal. In November she competed at her first ISU Challenger Series (CS) event, 2017 CS Tallinn Trophy, where she won the silver medal behind her teammate Stanislava Konstantinova. Two weeks later Fedichkina took her second CS silver medal at the 2017 CS Golden Spin of Zagreb. Again she finished behind Konstantinova.

After the 2018 Russian Figure Skating Championships, where Fedichkina did not compete due to injury, she parted ways with coach Evgeni Rukavicin to join Alexei Mishin's group.

== Programs ==
Season	Short program	Free skating	Exhibition
2018–2019	(Where Do I Begin?) Love Story performed by Mireille Mathieu	What Is a Youth? performed by Joanna Wang; Love Theme from Romeo and Juliet by Nino Rota	
2017–2018	Piano Fantasy by Wolfgang Amadeus Mozart	La La Land (soundtrack) by Justin Hurwitz: City of Stars performed by Ryan Gosling and Emma Stone; Planetarium	
2016–2017	Russian Dance (from Swan Lake) by Pyotr Ilyich Tchaikovsky choreo. by Olga Glinka	Singin' in the Rain: Singin' in the Rain performed by Gene Kelly; Good Morning performed by Gene Kelly, Debbie Reynolds, and Donald O'Connor choreo. by Olga Glinka	
2015–2016	Valse Sentimentale, Op. 51, No. 6 by Pyotr Ilyich Tchaikovsky choreo. by Olga Glinka	Nos Souvenirs (from Cats) by Andrew Lloyd Webber performed by Mireille Mathieu choreo. by Olga Glinka	
2014–2015	The Christ Trilogy by Balázs Havasi	Child of Light; Transcendence; Crystallize by Lindsey Stirling	
2013–2014	Danse Espagnole (from Swan Lake) by Pyotr Ilyich Tchaikovsky	Dark Eyes	

== Competitive highlights ==
CS: Challenger Series; JGP: Junior Grand Prix

International
Event	14–15	15–16	16–17	17–18	18–19
CS Golden Spin				2nd	
CS Tallinn Trophy				2nd	
Cup of Nice				1st	
Golden Bear					WD
International: Junior
Junior Worlds		WD			
JGP Final		4th			
JGP Japan			6th		
JGP Latvia		4th		4th	
JGP Spain		2nd			
Cup of Nice		1st	1st		
Tallinn Trophy		2nd	1st		
National
Russia		11th	10th	WD	
Russia: Junior	8th	3rd	6th		
J = Junior level; WD = Withdrew

== Detailed results ==
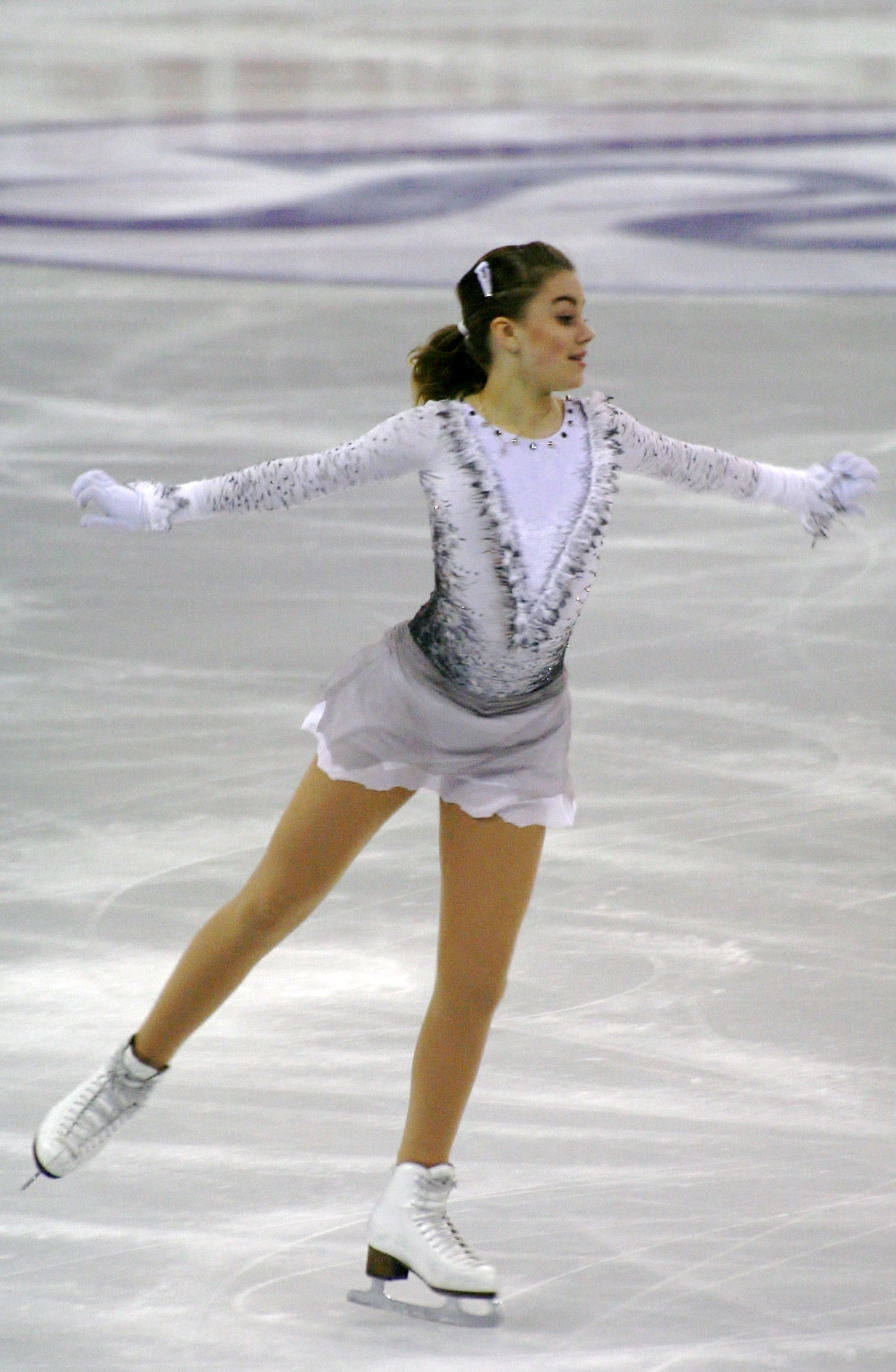
Fedichkina at the 2015–16 Junior Grand Prix Final

2017–18 season
Date	Event	Level	SP	FS	Total
6–9 December 2017	2017 CS Golden Spin of Zagreb	Senior	3; 67.06	4; 111.14	2; 178.20
21–26 November 2017	2017 CS Tallinn Trophy	Senior	2; 63.42	2; 116.91	2; 180.33
11–15 October 2017	2017 Cup of Nice	Senior	1; 65.89	2; 116.19	1; 182.08
6–9 September 2017	2017 JGP Latvia	Junior	2; 63.48	5; 108.50	4; 171.98
2016–17 season
Date	Event	Level	SP	FS	Total
1–5 February 2017	2017 Russian Junior Championships	Junior	3; 69.87	11; 116.46	6; 186.33
20–26 December 2016	2017 Russian Championships	Senior	9; 63.96	9; 125.61	10; 189.57
20–27 November 2016	2016 Tallinn Trophy	Junior	1; 68.27	1; 125.56	1; 193.83
19–23 October 2016	2016 Cup of Nice	Junior	1; 58.50.	1; 113.80	1; 172.30
7–11 September 2016	2016 JGP Japan	Junior	3; 61.13	6; 104.12	6; 165.25
2015–16 season
Date	Event	Level	SP	FS	Total
14–20 March 2016	2016 World Junior Championships	Junior	1; 66.11	WD	WD
19–23 January 2016	2016 Russian Junior Championships	Junior	3; 66.89	3; 120.55	3; 187.44
24–27 December 2015	2016 Russian Championships	Senior	14; 52.59	8; 124.88	11; 177.47
10–13 December 2015	2015−16 JGP Final	Junior	2; 64.17	4; 113.94	4; 178.11
18–22 November 2015	2015 Tallinn Trophy	Junior	2; 64.98	3; 110.31	2; 175.29
14–18 October 2015	2015 Cup of Nice	Junior	1; 63.08	1; 121.55	1; 184.63
30 September – 4 October 2015	2015 JGP Spain	Junior	1; 66.16	2; 120.22	2; 186.38
26–30 August 2015	2015 JGP Latvia	Junior	1; 63.49	5; 104.10	4; 167.59
2014–15 season
Date	Event	Level	SP	FS	Total
4–7 February 2015	2015 Russian Junior Championships	Junior	15; 52.18	8; 109.09	8; 161.27
