= Sherlock Holmes (soundtrack) =

Sherlock Holmes: Original Motion Picture Soundtrack

Soundtrack album by Hans Zimmer
- Released: 12 January 2010
- Studios: AIR Lyndhurst, London
- Genre: Film score
- Length: 52:29
- Label: WaterTower Music
- Producers: Hans Zimmer; Lorne Balfe

Hans Zimmer chronology
Angels & Demons (2009)	Sherlock Holmes: Original Motion Picture Soundtrack (2010)	It's Complicated (2009)

Professional ratings
Review scores
Source	Rating
AllMusic	4/5 stars
Empire	4/5 stars
Filmtracks	3/5 stars
Movie Music UK	4/5 stars
Movie Wave	3.5/5 stars
ScoreNotes	7.5/10 stars
SoundtrackNet	3/5 stars

Sherlock Holmes: Original Motion Picture Soundtrack is the soundtrack album to the 2009 film of the same name, directed by Guy Ritchie, starring Robert Downey Jr. and Jude Law.

== Background ==
Director Guy Ritchie used the soundtrack from the film The Dark Knight by Hans Zimmer as temporary music during editing. Zimmer was pleased when Ritchie asked him to do the score but was told to do something completely different. Zimmer described his score to Ritchie as the sound of The Pogues joining a Romanian orchestra. For the musical accompaniment, composer Hans Zimmer used a banjo, cimbalom, squeaky violins, a "broken pub piano" and other unconventional instruments such as the Experibass.

At first, Zimmer had his own piano detuned. But he found that it did not accomplish his goal. It simply sounded out of tune. He asked his assistant to locate a broken piano for him. The first piano they located was passed over as it had obviously been loved and cared for. But the second piano they found was the one they used in the production of Sherlock Holmes. Zimmer said "We rented 20th Century Fox’s underground car park one Sunday and did hideous things to a piano."

The boxing scene in the film also features a version of "Rocky Road to Dublin" by The Dubliners, which is not included in this album.

== Track listing ==
All music is composed by Hans Zimmer.

No.	Title	Length
1.	"Discombobulate"	2:25
2.	"Is It Poison, Nanny?"	2:53
3.	"I Never Woke Up in Handcuffs Before"	1:44
4.	"My Mind Rebels at Stagnation"	4:31
5.	"Data, Data, Data"	2:15
6.	"He's Killed the Dog Again"	3:15
7.	"Marital Sabotage"	3:44
8.	"Not in Blood, But in Bond"	2:13
9.	"Ah, Putrefaction"	1:50
10.	"Panic, Sheer Bloody Panic"	2:38
11.	"Psychological Recovery... 6 Months"	18:18
12.	"Catatonic"	6:46
Total length:		55:07
