= Sarah Tamura =

Canadian figure skater (born 2001)

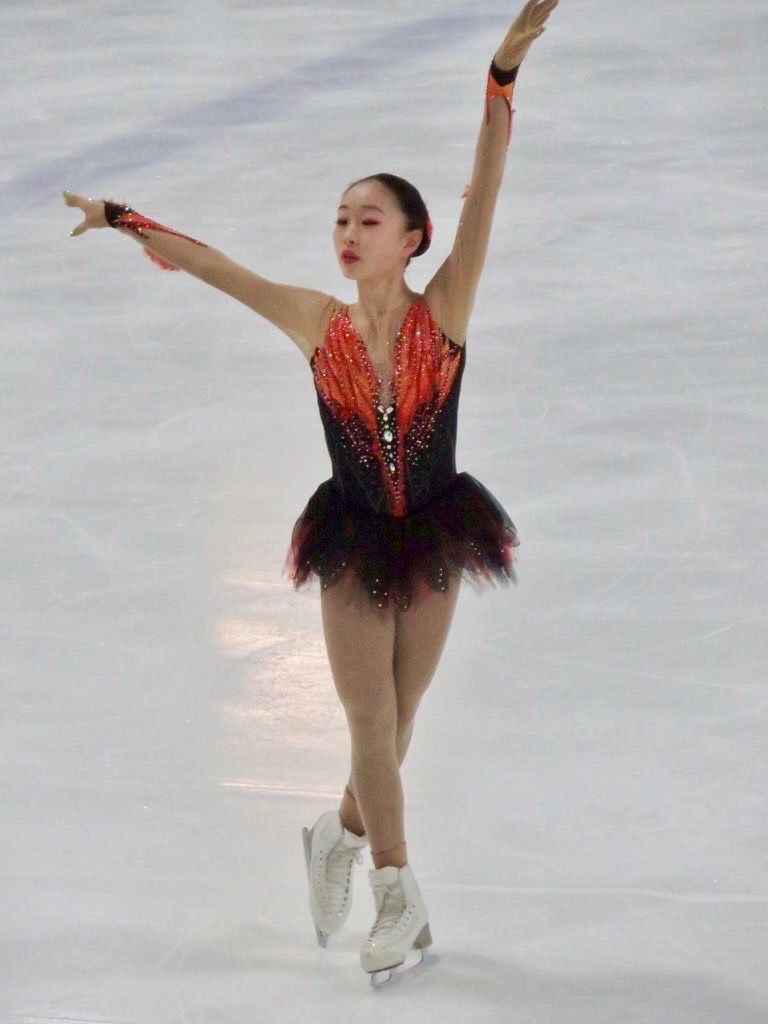
Sarah Tamura in 2016

Sarah Tamura (born January 21, 2001) is a Canadian figure skater. She is the 2014 Canadian Novice National Champion and the 2016 Canadian Junior National Champion. She has qualified to the free skate at two World Junior Championships, and represented Canada Internationally over the span of six consecutive years.

== Career ==
Tamura began learning to skate in 2005. She is coached by Joanne McLeod at Champs International Skating Center in Burnaby, British Columbia.

After winning the 2016 Canadian national junior title, she was sent to the 2016 World Junior Championships in Debrecen, Hungary. Ranked 16th after the short program, she qualified to the free skate and went on to finish 13th overall.

Tamura advanced to the free skate at the 2017 World Junior Championships in Taipei, Taiwan.

== Programs ==
Season	Short program	Free skating	Exhibition
2017–2018	Nuages... En Montagne by Pierre Ponte	Michael Meets Mozarts by The Piano Guys	
2016–2017	Asturias by Isaac Albéniz performed by William Joseph, Jesse Cook choreo. by Joanne McLeod	The Firebird by Igor Stravinsky choreo. by Shae-Lynn Bourne	
2015–2016	Asturias by Isaac Albéniz performed by William Joseph, Jesse Cook choreo. by Joanne McLeod	Paganini Rhapsody on Caprice No. 24 performed by David Garrett	Heart of Stone (from The Twilight Saga: Breaking Dawn – Part 2) by Iko
2014–2015	Farandole (from L'Arlésienne) performed by Klazz Brothers and Cuba Percussion	Paganini Rhapsody on Caprice No. 24 performed by David Garrett	
2010–2011	unknown	Malagueña by Ernesto Lecuona	

== Competitive highlights ==
CS: Challenger Series; JGP: Junior Grand Prix

International
Event	14–15	15–16	16–17	17–18	18-19	19-20
CS Autumn Classic				11th		
International: Junior
Event	14–15	15–16	16–17	17–18	18-19	19-20
Junior Worlds		13th	17th			
JGP Croatia	13th					
JGP Germany			6th			
JGP Japan	14th					
JGP Latvia		13th				
JGP Slovenia			8th			
Bavarian Open			1st			
National
Canadian Champ.	6th J	1st J	5th	9th	14th	17th
