= Angels & Demons (soundtrack) =

Angels & Demons (Original Motion Picture Soundtrack)

Soundtrack album by Hans Zimmer
- Released: May 12, 2009
- Recorded: 2009
- Studios: Sony Scoring Stage, Sony Pictures Studios, Culver City, California; Clinton Recording Studios, New York City; Remote Control Productions, Santa Monica, California
- Genre: Film score
- Length: 56:07
- Label: Sony Classical
- Producer: Hans Zimmer

Hans Zimmer chronology
| Frost/Nixon (2008) | Angels & Demons (2009) | It's Complicated (2009) |

Angels & Demons (Original Motion Picture Soundtrack) is the soundtrack album to the 2009 film Angels & Demons directed by Ron Howard. Based on Dan Brown's 2000 novel of the same title, it is the sequel to Howard's The Da Vinci Code, and the second installment in the Robert Langdon film series with Tom Hanks reprising his role as Professor Robert Langdon. The film score is composed and arranged by Hans Zimmer, featuring violin solos performed by Joshua Bell and was released through Sony Classical Records on May 12, 2009.

== Development ==
Hans Zimmer who previously composed the score for The Da Vinci Code returned for the sequel. The film score required a different musical approach than the predecessor, which led Zimmer to recruit a chamber group over a traditional orchestra to make the music "as agile and kinetic as Robert Langdon's firing synapses."

As the film revolves equally around religion and science, Zimmer used a combination of orchestra and chorus to represent religion and electronics to denote science. With the collaboration of the orchestra, Zimmer also collaborated with violinist Joshua Bell who "played like an angel with his violin framed by the contrasting starkness of the electronics. He added such beauty and grace to the music, and such depth to the characters".

Howard noted that there was nothing formulaic about Zimmer's thinking of the score and it suited the sound that the film calls for. As a nod to Langdon, he hid a five-note musical ambigram in the score, and also developed the "Chevaliers de Sangreal" track from the end of The Da Vinci Code as Langdon's main theme in the film, featuring prominently in the tracks "God Particle" and "503".

== Track listing ==
| No. | Title | Length |
|---|---|---|
| 1. | "160 BPM" | 6:41 |
| 2. | "God Particle" | 5:20 |
| 3. | "Air" | 9:07 |
| 4. | "Fire" | 6:51 |
| 5. | "Black Smoke" | 5:45 |
| 6. | "Science and Religion" | 12:27 |
| 7. | "Immolation" | 3:39 |
| 8. | "Election By Adoration" | 2:12 |
| 9. | "503" | 2:14 |
| 10. | "H2O" (bonus track) | 1:51 |
| Total length: | | 56:07 |

== Reception ==
Jonathan Broxton of Movie Music UK wrote "basically, that's how the score progresses, switching between the droning modernistic suspense cues and more classically inflected pieces for choir and strings. Bell's parts, and the choral parts, are lovely, but the album as a whole is dragged down by the ghastly synth effects, which take up too much of the album's running time, and are impossible to skip because, due to the length of the cues and the way the album is structured, the best bits by and large appear in the middle of cues." Christian Clemmensen of Filmtracks wrote "Angels & Demons is a score that really does not require a review of this length to provide an accurate recommendation. It may not intrigue you with originality as much as Front/Nixon, but it will entertain with its predictable brute force."

Thomas Glorieux of Maintitles wrote "Whatever can be said about Angels & Demons, I believe no one saw this turning into this direction except Hans Zimmer. And yet it will all work once it will be heard in the movie. As the trailer promises, this seems to be an action and suspenseful power antidote to the slow boring ride of The Da Vinci Code. And so Hans Zimmer could produce us this puppy. He uses the most important themes of The Da Vinci Code, gives them another spin and threw in more of his old school sound. In fact, it is sometimes amazing how much old-school Zimmer there is to be found here. But it works and it produces a somewhat interesting album, full of new twists and definitely not a TDVC recycle score. So Hallelujah to that. And now the Vatican can continue to damn the almighty thunder upon Angels & Demons."

Adrian Edwards of Gramophone wrote "After Zimmer's interesting soundtrack to The Da Vinci Code, we find him marking time with few fresh ideas. His trademarks of ambient music, walloping percussion and toccata-like rhythms are plentiful, though they manage to create a suspenseful atmosphere of shady goings-on." the score "[preserved] all of its elegiac atmosphere while bringing in more choral elements". Peter Rainer of The Christian Science Monitor Zimmer's score "seems to think it's underscoring The Greatest Story Ever Told on steroids". Mike Goodridge of Screen International described it as "a furiously urgent score complete with operatic Omen-style choirs."

Todd McCarthy of Variety called it a "thumping score". Hannah Goodwyn of Christian Broadcasting Network wrote "Hans Zimmer wrote a spectacular score for the film, keeping in tone with what was unfolding on screen". Joe Morgenstern of The Wall Street Journal stated that Zimmer's "pitiless score" is "endlessly excitable". Chris Bumbray of JoBlo.com wrote "Similarly bland is the score by Hans Zimmer, which is not a huge surprise as, with the exception of his work on Batman Begins (2005) & The Dark Knight (2008) with James Newton Howard, he hasn't done a great score since Gladiator (2000). He's turning into another Danny Elfman!". Matt Goldberg of Collider noted that though Zimmer's scor was used to great effect, he considered it to be shallow.

== Personnel ==
Credits adapted from liner notes:

- Music composer and producer – Hans Zimmer
- Additional music – Atli Örvarsson, Lorne Balfe
- Music arrangements – Hans Zimmer, Julian Kershaw
- Sequencer programming – Peter Oso Snell, Thomas Broderick
- Synth programming – Howard Scarr, Jacob Shea, Matthew Margeson, Noah Sorota
- Ambient music design – Mel Wesson
- Digital instrument design – Mark Wherry
- Sample development – Claudius Bruese, Michael Hobe, Sam Estes
- Sound engineer – Adam Schmidt, Katia Lewin
- Recording – Alan Meyerson, Geoff Foster, Greg Vines, Jeffrey Biggers, Slamm Andrews, Todd Whitelock
- Mixing – Alan Meyerson
- Mastering – Patricia Sullivan-Fourstar
- Music editor – Daniel Pinder
- Score editor – Letitia Rogers
- Music supervisor – Bob Badami
- Music coordinator – Andrew Zack
- Music preparation – Booker White
- Executive producer – Brian Grazer, John Calley, Ron Howard
- Music production services – Steven Kofsky
- Technical assistance – Andrew Kawczynski
- Graphic design – Elisabeth Ladwig

Orchestra

- Orchestrator – Bruce Fowler
- Orchestra conductor – Nick Glennie-Smith
- Orchestra contractor – Peter Rotter
- Orchestra leader and concertmaster – Endre Granat
- Studio manager – Czarina Russell

Soloists

- Cello – Martin Tillman
- Guitar – Heitor Pereira
- Percussion – Ryeland Allison, Satnam Ramgotra
- Synthesizer – Hans Zimmer
- Violin – Joshua Bell

Instrumentalists

- Bassoon – Judith Farmer, Kenneth Munday, Peter Mandell, Rose Corrigan, Michael O'Donovan
- Cello – Andrew Schulman, Armen Ksajikian, Cecelia Tsan, Christina Soule, Christine Ermacoff, Dane Little, David Speltz, Dennis Karmazyn, Erika Duke-Kirkpatrick, George Kim Scholes, Giovanna Clayton, Jennifer Lee Kuhn, John Walz, Paula Hochhalter, Timothy Landauer, Trevor Handy, Vanessa Freebairn-Smith, Victor Lawrence, Steve Erdody
- Double bass – Christian Kollgaard, David Parmeter, Donald Ferrone, Drew Dembowski, Edward Meares, Michael Valerio, Neil Garber, Oscar Hidalgo, Richard Feves, Stephen Dress, Susan Ranney, Nico Abondolo
- Trombone – Bruce Fowler, Phillip Teele
- Trumpet – Walter Fowler
- Viola – Alma Fernandez, Andrew Duckles, Darrin McCann, David Walther, Kazi Pitelka, Keith Greene, Marlow Fisher, Matthew Funes, Robert Brophy, Roland Kato, Shawn Mann, Victoria Miskolczy, Brian Dembow
- Violin – Alan Grunfeld, Alyssa Park, Belinda Broughton, Bruce Dukov, Charlie Bisharat, Darius Campo, Eun-Mee Ahn, Jeanne Skrocki, Josefina Vergara, Katia Popov, Kevin Connolly, Lisa M. Sutton, Lorenz Gamma, Marc Sazer, Natalie Leggett, Neil Samples, Phillip Levy, Rafael Rishik, Roberto Cani, Roger Wilkie, Sarah Thornblade, Searmi Park, Serena McKinney, Tamara Hatwan, Tereza Stanislav, Julie Gigante

Management

- Music business and legal affairs – Tara Bruh
- Executive in charge of music – Lia Vollack
- General manager – Alex Miller
- Product marketing manager – Leslie Collman-Smith
- Product development manager – Jennifer Liebeskind, Laura Kszan
- A&R – David Lai

== Accolades ==
| Award | Category | Recipient | Result | Ref. |
|---|---|---|---|---|
| ASCAP Film and Television Music Awards | Top Box Office Films (Note: shared with Sherlock Holmes) | Hans Zimmer | Won | |
| World Soundtrack Academy Awards | Soundtrack Composer of the Year (Note: also for Frost/Nixon and The Dark Knight) | Hans Zimmer | Nominated | |
