= 2016 World Junior Figure Skating Championships =

- Type: ISU Championship
- Date: 14 – 20 March
- Season: 2015–16
- Location: Debrecen, Hungary
- Host: Hungarian Skating Union

Champions
- Men's singles: (Israel) Daniel Samohin
- Ladies' singles: (Japan) Marin Honda
- Pairs: (Czech Republic) Anna Dušková / Martin Bidař
- Ice dance: (United States) Lorraine McNamara / Quinn Carpenter
- Previous: 2015 World Junior Championships
- Next: 2017 World Junior Championships

The 2016 World Junior Figure Skating Championships were held from 14–20 March 2016 in Debrecen, Hungary. Commonly called "World Juniors" and "Junior Worlds", the event determined the World Junior champions in the disciplines of men's singles, ladies' singles, pair skating, and ice dancing.

Anna Dušková / Martin Bidař and Daniel Samohin became the first World Junior champions in figure skating from the Czech Republic and Israel, respectively. Japan's Marin Honda won the ladies' title and Lorraine McNamara / Quinn Carpenter took the ice dancing event.

== Records ==
The following new junior records were set during this competition:

Event	Component	Skater(s)	Score	Date	Ref
Pairs	Short program	(Czech Republic) Anna Dušková / Martin Bidař	64.71	16 March 2016	
Pairs	Total score	(Czech Republic) Anna Dušková / Martin Bidař	181.82	17 March 2016	
Ice dance	Short dance	(United States) Rachel Parsons / Michael Parsons	67.88	17 March 2016	
Ice dance	Free dance	(United States) Lorraine McNamara / Quinn Carpenter	97.40	19 March 2016	
Ice dance	Total score	(United States) Rachel Parsons / Michael Parsons	162.74	19 March 2016	
Ice dance	Total score	(United States) Lorraine McNamara / Quinn Carpenter	163.65	19 March 2016	
Men	Free skating	(Israel) Daniel Samohin	165.38	20 March 2016	

== Qualification ==
The competition was open to skaters from ISU member nations who were at least 13 but not 19—or 21 for male pair skaters and ice dancers—before July 1, 2015 in their place of birth. National associations selected their entries according to their own criteria but the ISU mandated that their selections achieve a minimum technical elements score (TES) at an international event prior to the Junior Worlds.

The term "Junior" in ISU competition refers to age, not skill level. Skaters may remain age-eligible for Junior Worlds even after competing nationally and internationally at the senior level. At junior events, the ISU requires that all programs conform to junior-specific rules regarding program length, jumping passes, types of elements, etc.

=== Minimum TES ===
Minimum technical scores (TES)
Discipline	Short	Free
Men	20	42
Ladies	20	35
Pairs	20	30
Ice dancing	18	28
Scores had to be achieved at an ISU-recognized international event in the ongoing or preceding season. SP and FS scores could be attained at different events.

=== Number of entries per discipline ===
Based on the results of the 2015 World Junior Championships, the ISU allowed each country one to three entries per discipline.

Spots	Men	Ladies	Pairs	Dance
3	Japan; Russia	Russia; Japan	China; Canada; Russia; United States	Russia; United States; Canada
2	China; United States; Latvia; Israel; South Korea	Kazakhstan; United States; South Korea; Latvia	Japan; Czech Republic	Ukraine; France; Poland; Hungary
If not listed above, one entry is allowed.

== Entries ==
Some national associations began announcing their selections in December 2015. The ISU published a complete list on 25 February 2016.

Country	Men	Ladies	Pairs	Ice dancing
Armenia		Anastasia Galustyan		
Australia	James Min	Katie Pasfield		Mathilda Friend / William Badaoui
Austria	Luc Maierhofer	Natalie Klotz		Elizaveta Orlova / Stephano-Valentino Schuster
Belgium		Charlotte Vandersarren		
Belarus	Yakau Zenko			Maria Oleynik / Yuri Hulitski
Bulgaria		Teodora Markova		Yana Bozhilova / Kaloyan Georgiev
Canada	Nicolas Nadeau	Sarah Tamura	Justine Brasseur / Mathieu Ostiguy; Bryn Hoffman / Bryce Chudak; Hope McLean / Trennt Michaud	Mackenzie Bent / Dmitre Razgulajevs; Marjorie Lajoie / Zachary Lagha; Melinda Meng / Andrew Meng
China	Zhang He; Li Tangxu	Li Xiangning	Gao Yumeng / Li Bowen	Li Xibei / Xiang Guangyao
Croatia	Nicholas Vrdoljak			
Czech Republic	Jiří Bělohradský	Elizaveta Ukolova	Anna Dušková / Martin Bidař	Nicole Kuzmich / Alexander Sinicyn
Denmark		Leonora Colmor Jepsen		
Spain	Hector Alonso Serrano	Maëva Gallarda Rossell		
Estonia	Aleksandr Selevko	Kristina Škuleta-Gromova		Victoria Semenjuk / Artur Gruzdev
Finland	Roman Galay	Viveca Lindfors		
France	Kévin Aymoz	Alizée Crozet		Marie-Jade Lauriault / Romain Le Gac; Angélique Abachkina / Louis Thauron
Georgia	Irakli Maysuradze			
Germany	Catalin Dimitrescu	Lea Johanna Dastich		Ria Schwendinger / Valentin Wunderlich
(United Kingdom) Great Britain	Josh Brown	Danielle Harrison	Chloe Curtin / Steven Adcock	Ekaterina Fedyushchenko / Lucas Kitteridge
Hong Kong		Maisy Hiu Ching Ma		
Hungary	Máté Böröcz	Ivett Tóth		Kimberly Wei / Ilias Fourati; Villő Marton / Danyil Semko
Israel	Daniel Samohin; Mark Gorodnitsky			
Italy	Matteo Rizzo	Lucrezia Gennaro	Bianca Manacorda / Niccolò Macii	Sara Ghislandi / Giona Terzo Ortenzi
Japan	Shu Nakamura; Daichi Miyata; Kazuki Tomono	Wakaba Higuchi; Yuna Shiraiwa; Marin Honda		Rikako Fukase / Aru Tateno
Kazakhstan	Daniyar Adylov	Elizabet Tursynbayeva	Ekaterina Khokhlova / Abish Baytkanov	Hannah Grace Cook / Temirlan Yerzhanov
Latvia	Deniss Vasiļjevs; Glebs Basins	Angelīna Kučvaļska; Diāna Ņikitina		
Lithuania		Elzbieta Kropa		Guostė Damulevičiūtė / Deividas Kizala
Malaysia	Kai Xiang Chew			
Netherlands		Kyarha van Tiel		
Norway	Sondre Oddvoll Bøe	Juni Marie Benjaminsen		
Poland		Aleksandra Rudolf		Alexandra Borisova / Cezary Zawadzki; Jenna Hertenstein / Damian Binkowski
Romania		Julia Sauter		
Russia	Dmitri Aliev; Alexander Samarin; Roman Savosin	Alisa Fedichkina; Maria Sotskova; Polina Tsurskaya	Anastasia Gubanova / Alexei Sintsov; Ekaterina Borisova / Dmitry Sopot; Anastasia Mishina / Vladislav Mirzoev	Alla Loboda / Pavel Drozd; Betina Popova / Yuri Vlasenko; Anastasia Shpilevaya / Grigory Smirnov
South Africa		Michaela Du Toit		
Singapore		Shuran Yu		
Slovenia		Monika Peterka		
South Korea	Cha Jun-hwan; Byun Se-jong	Son Suh-hyun; Kim Ha-nul		Lee Ho-jung / Richard Kang-in Kam
Switzerland	Nicola Todeschini	Shaline Ruegger		
Slovakia	Jakub Kršňák	Alexandra Hagarová		
Sweden		Matilda Algotsson		
Thailand		Thita Lamsam		
Chinese Taipei	Chih-I Tsao	Amy Lin		
Turkey	Başar Oktar	Elif Erdem		
Ukraine	Yaroslav Paniot	Anastasia Hozhva	Renata Ohanesian / Mark Bardei	Anzhelika Yurchenko / Volodymyr Byelikov; Maria Holubtsova / Kyrylo Byelobrov
United States	Tomoki Hiwatashi; Vincent Zhou	Tyler Pierce; Bradie Tennell	Chelsea Liu / Brian Johnson; Joy Weinberg / Maximiliano Fernandez; Lindsay Weinstein / Jacob Simon	Lorraine McNamara / Quinn Carpenter; Rachel Parsons / Michael Parsons; Elliana Pogrebinsky / Alex Benoit

=== Changes to initial assignments ===
Announced	Discipline	Initial	Replacement	Reason
28 January 2016	Men	(United States) Nathan Chen	(United States) Tomoki Hiwatashi	Chen's hip surgery
25 February 2016	Ice dance	(United Kingdom) Gwen Sletten / Elliot Verburg	(United Kingdom) Ekaterina Fedyushchenko / Lucas Kitteridge	Sletten retired.
25 February 2016	Ladies	(Denmark) Pernille Sørensen	(Denmark) Leonora Colmor Jepsen	Sørensen retired.
1 March 2016	Ladies	(Italy) Sara Casella	(Italy) Lucrezia Gennaro	
1 March 2016	Men	(Hungary) Alexander Maszljanko	(Hungary) Máté Böröcz	
1 March 2016	Pairs	(Chile) Zhao Ying / Xie Zhong	—N/a	
7 March 2016	Ice dance	(Switzerland) Valentina Schär / Carlo Röthlisberger	—N/a	
9 March 2016	Men	(Sweden) Illya Solomin	—N/a	
10 March 2016	Pairs	(Russia) Amina Atakhanova / Ilia Spiridonov	(Russia) Anastasia Gubanova / Alexei Sintsov	Atakhanova's injury
12 March 2016	Men	(Japan) Sota Yamamoto	(Japan) Kazuki Tomono	Broken ankle

== Results ==
=== Men ===
Israel's Daniel Samohin climbed from 9th after the short program to win his country's first World Junior title in figure skating. Nicolas Nadeau, who missed the cut for the free skate in 2015, obtained the silver medal and three spots for Canada in the 2017 men's event. Called up to replace the injured Nathan Chen, Tomoki Hiwatashi was awarded the bronze medal in his first appearance at Junior Worlds.

Rank	Name	Nation	Total points	SP		FS	
1	Daniel Samohin	Israel	236.65	9	71.27	1	165.38
2	Nicolas Nadeau	Canada	224.76	8	73.90	2	150.86
3	Tomoki Hiwatashi	United States	222.52	6	74.97	3	147.55
4	Alexander Samarin	Russia	222.11	2	80.31	5	141.80
5	Vincent Zhou	United States	221.19	4	77.31	4	143.88
6	Dmitri Aliev	Russia	211.18	1	80.74	7	130.44
7	Cha Jun-hwan	South Korea	207.11	7	74.38	6	132.73
8	Deniss Vasiļjevs	Latvia	204.75	3	78.78	9	125.97
9	Kévin Aymoz	France	197.76	5	75.53	11	122.23
10	Zhang He	China	195.70	10	70.85	10	124.85
11	Yaroslav Paniot	Ukraine	189.50	15	62.56	8	126.94
12	Shu Nakamura	Japan	186.22	12	66.05	13	120.17
13	Matteo Rizzo	Italy	182.96	11	66.79	17	116.17
14	Roman Savosin	Russia	181.65	13	64.00	14	117.65
15	Kazuki Tomono	Japan	179.61	20	58.33	12	121.28
16	Jiří Bělohradský	Czech Republic	178.51	16	61.96	16	116.55
17	Yakau Zenko	Belarus	174.39	22	57.67	15	116.72
18	Daichi Miyata	Japan	169.19	19	59.10	18	110.09
19	Aleksandr Selevko	Estonia	166.61	17	60.91	20	105.70
20	Chih-I Tsao	Chinese Taipei	164.25	14	63.42	22	100.83
21	Sondre Oddvoll Bøe	Norway	163.64	21	57.72	19	105.92
22	Nicola Todeschini	Switzerland	161.15	18	59.59	21	101.56
23	Josh Brown	(United Kingdom) Great Britain	157.16	23	57.65	23	99.51
24	Irakli Maysuradze	Georgia	154.41	24	56.87	24	97.54
Did not advance to free skating
25	Li Tangxu	China	53.20	25	53.20	—N/a	
26	Nicholas Vrdoljak	Croatia	52.12	26	52.12	—N/a	
27	James Min	Australia	51.96	27	51.96	—N/a	
28	Héctor Alonso	Spain	51.41	28	51.41	—N/a	
29	Byun Se-jong	South Korea	50.67	29	50.67	—N/a	
30	Luc Maierhofer	Austria	50.27	30	50.27	—N/a	
31	Başar Oktar	Turkey	48.65	31	48.65	—N/a	
32	Daniyar Adylov	Kazakhstan	47.99	32	47.99	—N/a	
33	Roman Galay	Finland	45.47	33	45.47	—N/a	
34	Mark Gorodnitsky	Israel	45.28	34	45.28	—N/a	
35	Jakub Kršňák	Slovakia	43.19	35	43.19	—N/a	
36	Glebs Basins	Latvia	41.93	36	41.93	—N/a	
37	Kai Xiang Chew	Malaysia	39.77	37	39.77	—N/a	
38	Máté Böröcz	Hungary	37.16	38	37.16	—N/a	

=== Ladies ===
Youth Olympic and JGP Final champion Polina Tsurskaya withdrew before the short program due to an ankle injury. Short program leader Alisa Fedichkina withdrew before the start of the free skate, also due to an ankle injury.

Japan's Marin Honda ended Russia's five-year streak of World Junior ladies' titles. Despite her teammates' withdrawals, Maria Sotskova was able to retain three spots for Russia by placing in the top two. Wakaba Higuchi of Japan won her second consecutive bronze medal at Junior Worlds.

Rank	Name	Nation	Total points	SP		FS	
1	Marin Honda	Japan	192.98	2	66.11	1	126.87
2	Maria Sotskova	Russia	188.72	3	64.78	3	123.94
3	Wakaba Higuchi	Japan	183.73	5	58.08	2	125.65
4	Yuna Shiraiwa	Japan	171.59	8	56.23	5	115.36
5	Elizabet Tursynbayeva	Kazakhstan	170.83	14	50.11	4	120.72
6	Tyler Pierce	United States	167.19	7	56.56	6	110.63
7	Angelīna Kučvaļska	Latvia	161.29	6	57.92	8	103.37
8	Ivett Tóth	Hungary	153.70	15	49.98	7	103.72
9	Kim Ha-nul	South Korea	150.36	12	52.37	9	97.99
10	Diāna Ņikitina	Latvia	149.02	10	54.59	12	94.43
11	Bradie Tennell	United States	147.52	4	58.56	14	88.96
12	Lea Johanna Dastich	Germany	143.63	18	47.67	10	95.96
13	Sarah Tamura	Canada	141.32	16	48.11	13	93.21
14	Amy Lin	Chinese Taipei	139.14	22	44.52	11	94.62
15	Maisy Hiu Ching Ma	Hong Kong	138.11	11	52.69	15	85.42
16	Anastasia Galustyan	Armenia	137.35	9	55.80	16	81.55
17	Anastasia Gozhva	Ukraine	132.27	13	50.99	18	81.28
18	Kyarha van Tiel	Netherlands	127.18	17	47.94	20	79.24
19	Lucrezia Gennaro	Italy	125.25	23	43.74	17	81.51
20	Li Xiangning	China	123.94	24	43.38	19	80.56
21	Alizée Crozet	France	120.59	21	45.34	21	75.25
22	Juni Marie Benjaminsen	Norway	116.63	20	45.70	22	70.93
23	Son Suh-hyun	South Korea	115.41	19	46.18	23	69.23
WD	Alisa Fedichkina	Russia	withdrew	1	66.11	withdrew from competition	
Did not advance to free skating
25	Viveca Lindfors	Finland	43.19	25	43.19	—N/a	
26	Shaline Ruegger	Switzerland	42.66	26	42.66	—N/a	
27	Natalie Klotz	Austria	42.25	27	42.25	—N/a	
28	Shuran Yu	Singapore	42.21	28	42.21	—N/a	
29	Kristina Škuleta-Gromova	Estonia	41.68	29	41.68	—N/a	
30	Matilda Algotsson	Sweden	41.00	30	41.00	—N/a	
31	Michaela Du Toit	South Africa	40.86	31	40.86	—N/a	
32	Julia Sauter	Romania	39.67	32	39.67	—N/a	
33	Alexandra Hagarová	Slovakia	39.07	33	39.07	—N/a	
34	Monika Peterka	Slovenia	39.00	34	39.00	—N/a	
35	Katie Pasfield	Australia	38.96	35	38.96	—N/a	
36	Danielle Harrison	(United Kingdom) Great Britain	37.59	36	37.59	—N/a	
37	Elizaveta Ukolova	Czech Republic	37.57	37	37.57	—N/a	
38	Elif Erdem	Turkey	37.39	38	37.39	—N/a	
39	Aleksandra Rudolf	Poland	35.32	39	35.32	—N/a	
40	Teodora Markova	Bulgaria	34.50	40	34.50	—N/a	
41	Elzbieta Kropa	Lithuania	34.34	41	34.34	—N/a	
42	Leonora Colmor Jepsen	Denmark	34.05	42	34.05	—N/a	
43	Thita Lamsam	Thailand	33.39	43	33.39	—N/a	
44	Charlotte Vandersarren	Belgium	32.30	44	32.30	—N/a	
45	Maëva Gallarda Rossell	Spain	29.65	45	29.65	—N/a	

=== Pairs ===
Anna Dušková / Martin Bidař became the first Czech figure skaters to ever win gold at a World Junior Championships and the first pair skaters from outside China, Russia, or the United States to win the competition since 2000. Russian pairs Anastasia Mishina / Vladislav Mirzoev and Ekaterina Borisova / Dmitry Sopot took silver and bronze, respectively, in their first trip to Junior Worlds.

Rank	Name	Nation	Total points	SP		FS	
1	Anna Dušková / Martin Bidař	Czech Republic	181.82	1	64.71	1	117.11
2	Anastasia Mishina / Vladislav Mirzoev	Russia	172.60	2	59.50	2	113.10
3	Ekaterina Borisova / Dmitry Sopot	Russia	169.00	4	58.56	3	110.44
4	Renata Ohanesian / Mark Bardei	Ukraine	155.08	3	59.30	4	95.78
5	Chelsea Liu / Brian Johnson	United States	147.73	5	54.12	5	93.61
6	Bianca Manacorda / Niccolò Macii	Italy	141.76	7	49.80	6	91.96
7	Justine Brasseur / Mathieu Ostiguy	Canada	138.67	9	48.08	7	90.59
8	Bryn Hoffman / Bryce Chudak	Canada	138.12	6	52.20	10	85.92
9	Lindsay Weinstein / Jacob Simon	United States	137.58	8	48.75	8	88.83
10	Joy Weinberg / Maximiliano Fernandez	United States	135.71	10	47.54	9	88.17
11	Anastasia Gubanova / Alexei Sintsov	Russia	123.90	11	45.07	11	78.83
12	Chloe Curtin / Steven Adcock	(United Kingdom) Great Britain	112.68	12	44.74	13	67.94
13	Gao Yumeng / Li Bowen	China	112.56	14	42.24	12	70.32
14	Ekaterina Khokhlova / Abish Baytkanov	Kazakhstan	95.31	15	32.36	14	62.95
WD	Hope McLean / Trennt Michaud	Canada	withdrew	13	44.05	withdrew from competition	

=== Ice dancing ===
The United States won both the gold and silver medals. Lorraine McNamara / Quinn Carpenter overtook short program leaders Rachel Parsons / Michael Parsons for the title, finishing ahead by a margin of 0.91. It was the fourth appearance at Junior Worlds for both teams. Russia's Alla Loboda / Pavel Drozd rose from sixth after the short dance to take bronze in their first trip to the event.

Rank	Name	Nation	Total points	SD		FD	
1	Lorraine McNamara / Quinn Carpenter	United States	163.65	2	66.25	1	97.40
2	Rachel Parsons / Michael Parsons	United States	162.74	1	67.88	2	94.86
3	Alla Loboda / Pavel Drozd	Russia	151.19	6	58.93	3	92.26
4	Elliana Pogrebinsky / Alex Benoit	United States	146.83	5	59.05	4	87.78
5	Anastasia Shpilevaya / Grigory Smirnov	Russia	146.55	4	59.15	6	87.40
6	Betina Popova / Yuri Vlasenko	Russia	146.21	7	58.56	5	87.65
7	Angélique Abachkina / Louis Thauron	France	145.25	8	58.34	7	86.91
8	Marie-Jade Lauriault / Romain Le Gac	France	144.26	3	59.65	8	84.61
9	Mackenzie Bent / Dmitre Razgulajevs	Canada	138.61	9	56.76	9	81.85
10	Sara Ghislandi / Giona Terzo Ortenzi	Italy	131.18	12	52.19	11	78.99
11	Nicole Kuzmich / Alexandr Sinicyn	Czech Republic	128.91	14	49.08	10	79.83
12	Melinda Meng / Andrew Meng	Canada	128.83	10	52.60	12	76.23
13	Marjorie Lajoie / Zachary Lagha	Canada	128.06	11	52.57	13	75.49
14	Lee Ho-jung / Richard Kang-in Kam	South Korea	119.13	13	50.10	14	69.03
15	Anzhelika Yurchenko / Volodymyr Byelikov	Ukraine	112.65	15	47.66	16	64.99
16	Ria Schwendinger / Valentin Wunderlich	Germany	109.00	17	43.87	15	65.13
17	Maria Oleynik / Yuri Hulitski	Belarus	106.31	16	45.02	18	61.29
18	Maria Golubtsova / Kirill Belobrov	Ukraine	105.90	20	42.49	17	63.41
19	Rikako Fukase / Aru Tateno	Japan	102.10	19	42.63	19	59.47
20	Alexandra Borisova / Cezary Zawadzki	Poland	100.31	18	42.80	20	57.51
Did not advance to free skating
21	Li Xibei / Xiang Guangyao	China	41.16	21	41.16	—N/a	
22	Guostė Damulevičiūtė / Deividas Kizala	Lithuania	39.98	22	39.98	—N/a	
23	Villö Marton / Danyil Semko	Hungary	38.63	23	38.63	—N/a	
24	Ekaterina Fedyushchenko / Lucas Kitteridge	(United Kingdom) Great Britain	38.12	24	38.12	—N/a	
25	Victoria Semenjuk / Artur Gruzdev	Estonia	37.68	25	37.68	—N/a	
26	Jenna Hertenstein / Damian Binkowski	Poland	37.68	26	37.68	—N/a	
27	Hannah Grace Cook / Temirlan Yerzhanov	Kazakhstan	37.60	27	37.60	—N/a	
28	Kimberly Wei / Illias Fourati	Hungary	34.48	28	34.48	—N/a	
29	Elizaveta Orlova / Stephano-Valentino Schuster	Austria	32.53	29	32.53	—N/a	
30	Matilda Friend / William Badaoui	Australia	31.98	30	31.98	—N/a	
31	Yana Bozhilova / Kaloyan Georgiev	Bulgaria	28.27	31	28.27	—N/a	

== Medals summary ==
=== Medalists ===
Medals for overall placement:

Discipline	Gold	Silver	Bronze
Men	(Israel) Daniel Samohin	(Canada) Nicolas Nadeau	(United States) Tomoki Hiwatashi
Ladies	(Japan) Marin Honda	(Russia) Maria Sotskova	(Japan) Wakaba Higuchi
Pairs	(Czech Republic) Anna Dušková / Martin Bidař	(Russia) Anastasia Mishina / Vladislav Mirzoev	(Russia) Ekaterina Borisova / Dmitry Sopot
Ice dancing	(United States) Lorraine McNamara / Quinn Carpenter	(United States) Rachel Parsons / Michael Parsons	(Russia) Alla Loboda / Pavel Drozd

Small medals for placement in the short segment:

Discipline	Gold	Silver	Bronze
Men	(Russia) Dmitri Aliev	(Russia) Alexander Samarin	(Latvia) Deniss Vasiļjevs
Ladies	(Russia) Alisa Fedichkina	(Japan) Marin Honda	(Russia) Maria Sotskova
Pairs	(Czech Republic) Anna Dušková / Martin Bidař	(Russia) Anastasia Mishina / Vladislav Mirzoev	(Ukraine) Renata Ohanesian / Mark Bardei
Ice dancing	(United States) Rachel Parsons / Michael Parsons	(United States) Lorraine McNamara / Quinn Carpenter	(France) Marie-Jade Lauriault / Romain Le Gac

Small medals for placement in the free segment:

Discipline	Gold	Silver	Bronze
Men	(Israel) Daniel Samohin	(Canada) Nicolas Nadeau	(United States) Tomoki Hiwatashi
Ladies	(Japan) Marin Honda	(Japan) Wakaba Higuchi	(Russia) Maria Sotskova
Pairs	(Czech Republic) Anna Dušková / Martin Bidař	(Russia) Anastasia Mishina / Vladislav Mirzoev	(Russia) Ekaterina Borisova / Dmitry Sopot
Ice dancing	(United States) Lorraine McNamara / Quinn Carpenter	(United States) Rachel Parsons / Michael Parsons	(Russia) Alla Loboda / Pavel Drozd

=== By country ===
Table of medals for overall placement:

Rank	Nation	Gold	Silver	Bronze	Total
1	United States (USA)	1	1	1	3
2	Japan (JPN)	1	0	1	2
3	Czech Republic (CZE)	1	0	0	1
3	Israel (ISR)	1	0	0	1
5	Russia (RUS)	0	2	2	4
6	Canada (CAN)	0	1	0	1
Totals (6 entries)		4	4	4	12
