= It's Complicated (soundtrack) =

It's Complicated (Original Motion Picture Soundtrack)

EP / film score by Hans Zimmer and Heitor Pereira
- Released: December 22, 2009
- Recorded: 2009
- Studio: Sony Scoring Stage, Sony Pictures Studios, Culver City, California; Remote Control Productions, Santa Monica, California
- Genre: Film score
- Length: 16:51
- Label: Back Lot Music
- Producer: Hans Zimmer; Heitor Pereira

Hans Zimmer chronology
Sherlock Holmes (2009)	It's Complicated (2009)	Inception (2010)

Heitor Pereira chronology
The Canyon (2009)	It's Complicated (2009)	Curious George 2: Follow That Monkey! (2010)

It's Complicated (Original Motion Picture Soundtrack) is the film score composed by Hans Zimmer and Heitor Pereira to the 2009 film It's Complicated directed by Nancy Meyers, starring Meryl Streep, Steve Martin, Alec Baldwin and John Krasinski. The soundtrack was composed by Hans Zimmer and Heitor Pereira and released through Back Lot Music on December 22, 2009.

== Background ==
Hans Zimmer composed the score for It's Complicated, after previously working with Meyers on Something's Gotta Give (2003) and The Holiday (2006). Heitor Pereira served as the co-composer, while Henry Jackman is credited for additional music. Zimmer created the themes while Pereira worked on the score. Initially, Varèse Sarabande intended to release the score album, but scuttled those plans as only little original score had been present in the film. As a result, Universal's in-house distributor Back Lot Music released the album on December 22, 2009, through digital download. Only six tracks of their score had been present in the album, with a duration of around 17 minutes.

== Reception ==
James Southall of Movie Wave wrote "The music is similar to The Holiday (a film from the same director) – a pleasant, tuneful series of pieces which are undemanding, attractive and pretty relaxing." Mike Goodridge of Screen International called it an "ethereal" work, while Kirk Honeycutt of The Hollywood Reporter and Manohla Dargis of The New York Times described it to be "fascinating" and "simplistic".

== Track listing ==
No.	Title	Length
1.	"It's Complicated"	4:15
2.	"The Original Five"	3:07
3.	"Interrupted Kiss"	1:54
4.	"iSight Surprise"	1:53
5.	"How Much I Like You"	1:12
6.	"No Regrets"	4:30
Total length:		16:51

== Accolades ==
Awards	Category	Recipient(s) and nominee(s)	Result	Ref.
ASCAP Film and Television Music Awards	Top Box Office Films	Hans Zimmer and Heitor Pereira	Won	
Motion Picture Sound Editors	Best Sound Editing – Music in a Feature Film	Andrew Silver (supervising music editor); Stephanie Lowry, Ryan Rubin (music editors)	Nominated	
World Soundtrack Awards	Soundtrack Composer of the Year	Hans Zimmer (also for Sherlock Holmes)	Nominated	

== Reception ==
Credits adapted from liner notes and Hans Zimmer's website:

- Music composer and producer: Hans Zimmer, Heitor Pereira
- Music supervisor: Kathy Nelson
- Additional music: Henry Jackman
- Featured soloists: Ryeland Allison, Jack Dolman, Heitor Pereira, Satnam Ramgotra
- Music editor: Ryan Rubin
- Additional music editor: Stephanie Lowry
- Orchestra conductor: Nick Glennie-Smith
- Orchestra leader: Endre Granat
- Orchestrators: Bruce Fowler, Walt Fowler, Rick Giovinazzo, Kevin Kaska
- Digital recordist: Larry Mah
- Music preparation: Booker White
- Orchestra contractors: Sandy DeCrescent, Peter Rotter
- Music consultants: Hallie Meyers-Shyer, Bonnie Greenberg
- Music production services: Steven Kofsky
- Score coordinator: Mark Wherry
- Score recording and mixing: Alan Meyerson
- Scoring crew: Greg Loskorn, Adam Michalak, Mark Eshelman, Dave Marquette
- Score engineer: Thomas Broderick
- Studio manager: Czarina Russell
