= Cody Hay =

Canadian pair skater (born 1983)

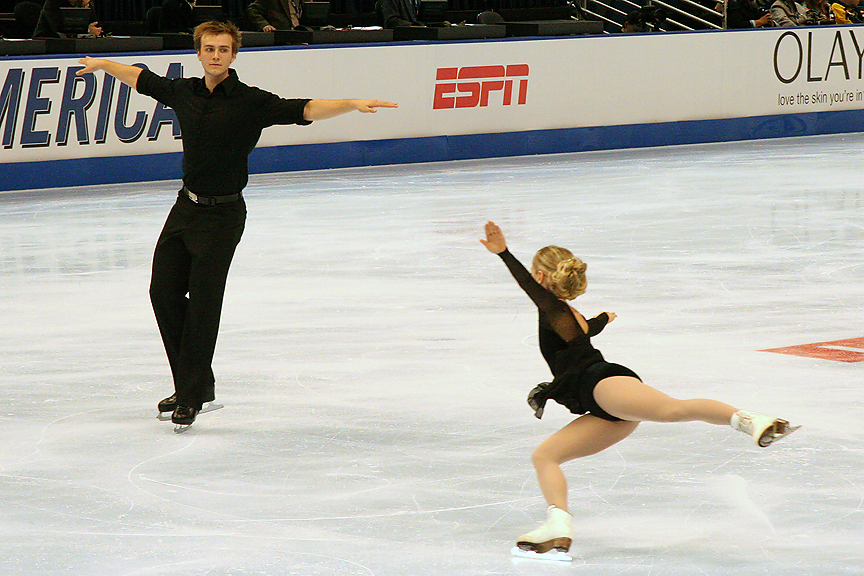
- Hay (left) and Langlois in 2006

Personal information
- Born: July 28, 1983 (age 43) Dawson Creek, British Columbia
- Height: 6 ft 0 in (1.83 m)

Figure skating career
- Country: Canada
- Partner: Anabelle Langlois
- Skating club: Royal Glenora Club Edmonton
- Began skating: 1994
- Retired: 2011

Cody Hay (born July 28, 1983) is a Canadian professional figure skating coach and former figure skater. With Anabelle Langlois, he is the 2008 Canadian national champion. He is now a coach with Langlois.

== Career ==
Cody Hay teamed up with Annabelle Langlois in 2005. The pair finished 4th at the 2006 Skate America. They were forced to withdraw from their second event, 2006 Cup of Russia, because the airline lost Langlois' skates. Langlois/Hay took bronze at the 2007 Canadian Championships and were named to their first Worlds team. They placed 10th at the 2007 World Championships in Tokyo, Japan.

In the 2007–08 season, Langlois/Hay competed at Skate Canada and NHK Trophy, before winning their first national title at the 2008 Canadian Championships in Vancouver, British Columbia. They went on to compete at the 2008 World Championships in Sweden, where they placed 8th.

Langlois sustained a spiral fracture to her lower right fibula during practice on July 23, 2008, and underwent surgery a week later, after which she had five screws and a metal plate in her ankle. The pair, assigned to the 2008 Skate Canada International and 2008 NHK Trophy, withdrew from both Grand Prix events. Langlois returned to training in mid-September but had trouble walking during a January 6, 2009, practice session. It was determined that she had tissue damage and the pair withdrew from the 2009 Canadian Championships. Around February 2009, she had surgery to remove the screws and metal plate. The pair subsequently withdrew from the 2009 Four Continents Championships and 2009 World Championships.

Langlois/Hay's first international competition back from her injury was the 2009 Nebelhorn Trophy held in Oberstdorf, Germany. Later on in November 2009, they were back on the Grand Prix circuit where they placed 4th at Skate Canada in Kitchener, Ontario. At the 2010 Canadian Championships in London, Ontario, Langlois/Hay won the silver medal behind Jessica Dubé / Bryce Davison and were named to the Olympic team. They placed 9th in Vancouver, British Columbia.

On May 21, 2010, Langlois and Hay announced the end of their partnership; Langlois had decided to retire from competition.

As of September 2011 Hay retired to become a coach with Langlois.

== Personal life ==
Langlois and Hay married on May 21, 2012. Their daughter, Mia Olivia Hay, was born on March 28, 2013. Their son, Zac, was born in 2016.

== Programs ==
=== With Langlois ===
Season	Short program	Free skating
2009–2010	Fascination	Grand Canyon Suite by Ferde Grofé
2007–2008	Historia de un amor by Pérez Prado	Doctor Zhivago by Maurice Jarre
2006–2007	Mr. Monotony by Irving Berlin	The Notebook
2005–2006	The Messiah Is Coming	Adagio from Concierto de Aranjuez by Joaquín Rodrigo

=== With Hoffmann ===
Season	Short program	Free skating
2003–2004	Out of Africa by John Barry Pittsburgh Symphony Orchestra	Cinderella by Johann Strauss National Philharmonic Orchestra

== Competitive highlights ==
GP: Grand Prix; JGP: Junior Grand Prix

=== With Langlois ===
International
Event	2005–06	2006–07	2007–08	2009–10
Olympics				9th
Worlds		10th	8th	10th
Four Continents	6th	7th		
GP Cup of Russia		WD		
GP NHK Trophy			5th	
GP Skate America		4th		
GP Skate Canada	4th		4th	4th
Karl Schäfer	2nd			
Nebelhorn Trophy				3rd
National
Canadian Champ.	4th	3rd	1st	2nd
WD = Withdrew; Langlois/Hay did not compete in the 2008–2009 season.

=== With Hoffmann ===
International
Event	2002–03	2003–04	2004–05
JGP Bulgaria		5th	
JGP Croatia		5th	
JGP France			7th
National
Canadian Championships	6th N	6th J	5th J
Levels: N = Novice; J = Junior
