= Anabelle Langlois =

Canadian pair skater

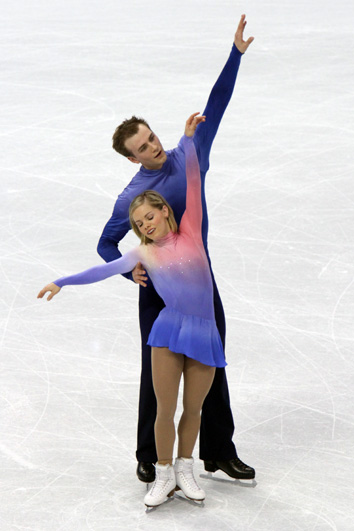
- Anabelle Langlois and Cody Hay at the 2010 Olympics

Personal information
- Born: July 21, 1981 (age 45) Grand-Mère, Quebec
- Height: 1.50 m (4 ft 11 in)

Figure skating career
- Country: Canada
- Partner: Cody Hay
- Skating club: CPA Hull
- Began skating: 1989
- Retired: May 2010
Medal record
Representing Canada
Pairs' Figure skating
Four Continents Championships
Silver medal – second place	2002 Jeonju	Pairs

Anabelle Langlois (born July 21, 1981) is a Canadian professional figure skating coach and former skater. She is the 2008 Canadian Figure Skating Champion with Cody Hay and the 2002 Four Continents Figure Skating Championships silver medallist with Patrice Archetto.

== Career ==
Langlois teamed up with Patrice Archetto in 1998. She fractured her skull as a result of a fall on a throw jump at the 1998 Canadian Championships. She wore a hockey helmet for six months afterward. Langlois/Archetto won the silver medal at the 2002 Four Continents Championships, five Grand Prix medals, and five Canadian national medals. Jan Ullmark coached the pair in Edmonton. Their partnership ended when Archetto retired from competition in 2005.

Langlois teamed up with Cody Hay in 2005. The pair finished 4th at the 2006 Skate America. They were forced to withdraw from their second event, 2006 Cup of Russia, because the airline lost Langlois' skates. Langlois/Hay took bronze at the 2007 Canadian Championships and were named to their first Worlds team. They placed 10th at the 2007 World Championships in Tokyo, Japan.

In the 2007–08 season, Langlois/Hay competed at Skate Canada and NHK Trophy, before winning their first national title at the 2008 Canadian Championships in Vancouver, British Columbia. They went on to compete at the 2008 World Championships in Sweden, where they placed 8th.

Langlois sustained a spiral fracture to her lower right fibula during practice on July 23, 2008, and underwent surgery a week later, after which she had five screws and a metal plate in her ankle. The pair, assigned to the 2008 Skate Canada International and 2008 NHK Trophy, withdrew from both Grand Prix events. Langlois returned to training in mid-September but had trouble walking during a January 6, 2009, practice session. It was determined that she had tissue damage and the pair withdrew from the 2009 Canadian Championships. Around February 2009, she had surgery to remove the screws and metal plate. The pair subsequently withdrew from the 2009 Four Continents Championships and 2009 World Championships.

Langlois/Hay's first international competition back from her injury was the 2009 Nebelhorn Trophy held in Oberstdorf, Germany. Later on in November 2009, they were back on the Grand Prix circuit where they placed 4th at Skate Canada in Kitchener, Ontario. At the 2010 Canadian Championships in London, Ontario, Langlois/Hay won the silver medal behind Jessica Dubé / Bryce Davison and were named to the Olympic team. They placed 9th in Vancouver, British Columbia.

On May 21, 2010, Langlois announced her retirement from competition. She participated in the fall 2010 and fall 2011 seasons of Battle of the Blades on CBC.

== Personal life ==
Langlois and Hay became engaged in 2010. They married on May 21, 2012. Their daughter, Mia Olivia Hay, was born on March 28, 2013. Their son, Zac, was born in 2016. Langlois and her family now live in Waterloo, Ontario, where she works as Technical Director of the Kitchener-Waterloo Skating Club.

== Programs ==
=== With Hay ===
Season	Short program	Free skating
2009–2010	Fascination	Grand Canyon Suite by Ferde Grofé
2007–2008	Historia de un amor by Pérez Prado	Doctor Zhivago by Maurice Jarre
2006–2007	Mr. Monotony by Irving Berlin	The Notebook
2005–2006	The Messiah Is Coming	Adagio from Concierto de Aranjuez by Joaquín Rodrigo

=== With Archetto ===
Season	Short program	Free skating
2004–2005	Romeo and Juliet by Nino Rota	Un homme et son péché by Michel Cusson
2003–2004	Leyenda performed by Vanessa-Mae	Lawrence of Arabia by Maurice Jarre
2002–2003	Harlem Nocturne by Duke Ellington	Tosca by Giacomo Puccini
2001–2002	Gypsy Earrings by Puerto Vallarat Squeeze; As Time Goes By; Trumpet Blues John Evans Orchestra	I Will Wait For You (from The Umbrellas of Cherbourg) by Michel Legrand Pittsburg Symphony Orchestra
2000–2001	Puerro Vallarra Squeeze by Wille and Lobo; Gypsy Earrings by Strunz and Farah	Capricco Italien Opus 45 by Pyotr Tchaikovsky

== Competitive highlights ==
GP: Grand Prix

=== With Hay ===
International
Event	2005–06	2006–07	2007–08	2009–10
Olympics				9th
Worlds		10th	8th	10th
Four Continents	6th	7th		
GP Cup of Russia		WD		
GP NHK Trophy			5th	
GP Skate America		4th		
GP Skate Canada	4th		4th	4th
Karl Schäfer	2nd			
Nebelhorn Trophy				3rd
National
Canadian Champ.	4th	3rd	1st	2nd
WD = Withdrew

=== With Archetto ===
International
Event	98–99	99–00	00–01	01–02	02–03	03–04	04–05
Olympics				12th			
Worlds				10th	5th	8th	
Four Continents			6th	2nd	4th	5th	
GP Final					6th	4th	
GP Lalique/Bompard						4th	WD
GP NHK Trophy				WD	3rd	2nd	
GP Skate Canada				3rd	3rd	4th	4th
GP Skate America					2nd		
National
Canadian Champ.	9th	6th	3rd	3rd	2nd	2nd	3rd
WD = Withdrew
