= The Unauthorized Beverly Hills, 90210 Story =

2015 television film

- Written by: Jeffrey Roda
- Directed by: Vanessa Parise
- Starring: Dan Castellaneta; Samantha Munro; Abbie Cobb; Max Lloyd-Jones; Jesy McKinney; Ross Linton; Michele Goyns; Adam Korson; David Lennon; Matty Finochio; Jeremy Guilbaut
- Theme music composer: Rich Walters
- Countries of origin: United States; Canada
- Original language: English

Production
- Producer: Peter M. Green
- Editor: Allan Lee
- Running time: 86 minutes
- Production companies: Front Street Pictures; Lifetime Television

Original release
- Network: Lifetime
- Release: October 3, 2015

The Unauthorized Beverly Hills, 90210 Story is a 2015 made-for-television movie based on the 1990s television drama Beverly Hills, 90210, directed by Vanessa Parise and produced by Peter M. Green. It was written by Jeffrey Roda. The film follows the creation of the show through its first four seasons, dealing with the relationships between the actors, between the producers Darren Star and Aaron Spelling and the media and fan attention the show brought.

== Cast ==
- Dan Castellaneta as Aaron Spelling
- Samantha Munro as Shannen Doherty
- Abbie Cobb as Jennie Garth
- Max Lloyd-Jones as Jason Priestley
- Jesy McKinney as Luke Perry
- Abby Ross as Tori Spelling
- Ross Linton as Brian Austin Green
- Michele Goyns as Gabrielle Carteris
- Adam Korson as Darren Star
- David Lennon as Ian Ziering
- Matty Finochio as Bill
- Jeremy Guilbaut as Will
- Lini Evans as Candy Spelling
- Alyssa Lynch as Tiffani-Amber Thiessen (Cameo)

== Broadcast ==
The film premiered on October 3, 2015, on Lifetime and M3.
