= BH90210 =

American comedy-drama television series

- Genre: Comedy-drama
- Created by: Jennie Garth; Tori Spelling; Mike Chessler; Chris Alberghini
- Based on: Beverly Hills, 90210 by Darren Star
- Starring: Gabrielle Carteris; Shannen Doherty; Jennie Garth; Brian Austin Green; Jason Priestley; Tori Spelling; Ian Ziering
- Theme music composer: John E. Davis
- Composer: Brian H. Kim
- Country of origin: United States
- Original language: English
- No. of seasons: 1
- No. of episodes: 6

Production
- Executive producers: Elizabeth Allen Rosenbaum; Jennie Garth; Tori Spelling; Shannen Doherty; Ian Ziering; Brian Austin Green; Jason Priestley; Gabrielle Carteris; Paul Sciarrotta; Mike Chessler; Chris Alberghini
- Cinematography: Matt Sakatani Roe
- Editors: Jamie Nelsen; Richie Edelson; Justin Chinn; Wendy A. Smith; David Dean
- Production companies: Alberghini Chessler Productions; Fox Entertainment; CBS Television Studios

Original release
- Network: Fox
- Release: August 7 – September 11, 2019

BH90210 is an American comedy drama series produced by Alberghini Chessler Productions, Fox Entertainment and CBS Television Studios that aired on Fox from August 7 to September 11, 2019. As the sixth series in the franchise, original series stars Jason Priestley, Shannen Doherty, Jennie Garth, Ian Ziering, Gabrielle Carteris, Brian Austin Green, and Tori Spelling return, playing themselves in a heightened version of reality that's inspired by their real lives and bonds, in which the actors deal with launching a reboot of Beverly Hills, 90210. In November 2019, the series was canceled after one season.

== Plot ==
The series focuses on the original cast members of Beverly Hills, 90210—Jason Priestley, Jennie Garth, Ian Ziering, Gabrielle Carteris, Brian Austin Green, Tori Spelling, and Shannen Doherty—playing heightened, fictionalized versions of themselves. Having parted ways 19 years after the original series ended, they reunite to get a reboot up and running, and must reconcile their new lives with the complications of their histories together.

== Cast ==
=== Main ===
The main cast is composed of actors from the original series portraying fictionalized versions of themselves. Their fictional characters and storylines are inspired by the actors' real lives.

- Gabrielle Carteris as herself: Carteris was Andrea Zuckerman in the original series. In the series, Carteris is president of the fictional Actors Guild of America, reflecting Carteris's real-life SAG-AFTRA presidency. In the series, Carteris's character explores her sexuality, decades into her heterosexual marriage. Carteris hoped the storyline would add authenticity to the series and promote representation, stating, "Women come to a time in their lives where they raise their kids, they've had their careers, their kids leave home, and they're deciding, 'Am I recommitting to my relationship? It's been a great ride. Do I want to stay here? Maybe there's something else.'"
- Shannen Doherty as herself: Doherty was Brenda Walsh in the original series and the CW revival. Doherty did not want her fictional characterization to affirm "the prevailing public image that she's a trouble-making villain," though she is depicted as being estranged from the rest of the cast. While Doherty said "the scripted version of Shannen is extremely heightened" and "a little bit more of a hippie", the character incorporated her real-life dedication to animal activism.
- Jennie Garth as herself: Garth was Kelly Taylor in the original series and several of its spin-offs. Developing a fictional version of herself required a lot of introspection, according to Garth, ultimately creating a character "in her ‘40s in a multiple-marriage situation, dealing with teenage girls, dealing with Hollywood, being in the limelight again and facing all those fears that were there when she was a young girl." Ziering reiterated that Garth's character would have a storied love life, reflecting Garth's real-life marriages.
- Brian Austin Green as himself: Green was David Silver on the original series. His fictionalized character is a stay-at-home dad.
- Jason Priestley as himself: Priestley was Brandon Walsh in the original series. According to Priestley, his fictionalized character "differs from [him] in every way", aside from his career as a TV director. Ziering elaborated that Priestley's character only directs teen dramas, leaving him creatively dissatisfied. Priestley also described his character as "Christopher Nolan-obsessed," and wore a "WWCND" ("What Would Christopher Nolan Do?") bracelet while filming.
- Tori Spelling as herself: Spelling was Donna Martin in the original series and several spin-offs. Creating the fictional Tori character proved difficult for the writers, according to Spelling, due to the public fodder surrounding the actor's personal life. The fictional Tori has six children, whereas Spelling has five in real life. According to Ziering, Spelling's character is "broke," reflecting the actor's alleged financial issues, and is thus the catalyst for getting the reboot off the ground. Spelling's reality television career is also satirized in the series as her family's main source of income.
- Ian Ziering as himself: Ziering was Steve Sanders in the original series. Ziering's character on the show is an entrepreneur. He describes the character as "much more motivating and inspiring" than Ziering is in real life, adding that he is "very well off, lives in a beautiful home, he's got everything he really needs — so we think."

=== Guest stars ===
- Carol Potter as herself: Potter portrayed Cindy Walsh on the original series, who now works as a licensed therapist.
- Christine Elise as herself: Elise recurred as Emily Valentine in the original series. According to Elise, the series takes "enormous liberties" with her characterization, including making her an executive at Fox and a lesbian, and she was adamant the story not heavily incorporate her real-life former romance with Priestley. Elise described her character as a villain with a vendetta against the main cast.
- La La Anthony as Shay: Brian's fictional wife and a successful pop/hip-hop artist. She is the breadwinner for the family while Brian is a stay-at-home dad. She has grown accustomed to being the center of attention but remains down to earth.
- Vanessa Lachey as Camille: Jason's fictional wife and a high-powered publicist who desires to start a family.
- Jenna Rosenow as Stacy: Ian's fictional wife, a fitness guru who's having a secret affair behind his back.
- Ivan Sergei as Nate: Tori's fictional husband and an ex-hockey player with aspirations of becoming a professional sports announcer. The Nate character was based on tabloid depictions of Spelling's real-life husband, Dean McDermott, as well as public perceptions of their marriage.
- Ty Wood as Zach: A young fan who watches the original show with his mother, and who initially believes himself to be Brian's alleged illegitimate son, which was subsequently disproved by DNA testing secretly ordered by Shay. At the end of the season finale, it is implied that Jason may possibly be his biological father.
- Karis Cameron as Kyler, Jennie's fictional teenage daughter who wants to become an actress like her mother. Jennie also hires Kyler to co-star with her in the reboot series after finding out that she wants to follow in her footsteps. Kyler, however, was laid off from the series by executives who ordered a number of changes for the show.
- Evan Roderick as Chaz Bryant
- Brad Bergeron as Matthew
- Destiny Millns as Heather
- Natalie Sharp as Anna: A writer who gets hired by the network to be the showrunner on the reboot series. Sharp said her character "owns her power so well... Anna will snap her fingers and tell you what you should be doing and what you shouldn't be doing. She really puts people in their place."
- Brendan Penny as Wyatt Jackson, Jennie's bodyguard who she hires to keep her safe.
- Jamie Walters as himself: Walters was Ray Pruit, Donna's abusive boyfriend, in the original series. Walters retired from acting after negative fan reaction to his character damaged his career. This trajectory is satirized within the series when Tori falsely accuses him of trying to sabotage their reboot in an act of revenge.
- Denise Richards as herself: Richards guest starred on the original series as Robin, Kelly's cousin. She appears as a heightened version of herself in the final episode of BH90210, when it is revealed she's Anna's mother.
- Davin Tong (credited as Peter Chao) as Tori's reality show director.

Archive footage of the late Luke Perry as Dylan McKay was used in the first episode, with the episode itself dedicated to Perry's memory.

== Episodes ==
No.	Title	Directed by	Written by	Original release date	U.S. viewers (millions)
1	"The Reunion"	Elizabeth Allen Rosenbaum	Teleplay by : Mike Chessler & Chris Alberghini and Paul Sciarrotta; Story by : Tori Spelling & Jennie Garth & Mike Chessler & Chris Alberghini	August 7, 2019	3.86
Having gone their separate ways since the series `Beverly Hills, 90210' ended 19 years ago, the cast members reunite at a 30th anniversary fan convention in Las Vegas, causing old flames, feuds and feelings to reignite.
2	"The Pitch"	Howard Deutch	Katie Wech	August 14, 2019	2.52
When FOX greenlights a reboot, Tori and Jennie confront each of their former castmates and are met with more resistance than they had anticipated; the gang deals with the repercussions of their actions in Las Vegas.
3	"The Photo Shoot"	Jason Priestley	Teleplay by : Jason Coffey & Merigan Mulhern and Mike Chessler & Chris Alberghini; Story by : Jason Coffey & Merigan Mulhern	August 21, 2019	2.19
Tori starts to feel the pressure of balancing the requirements of the cast; Jason and Ian both struggle with their marriage issues; Jennie meets her new bodyguard; Brian hires a new assistant; Gabby asks Christine for advice.
4	"The Table Read"	Melanie Mayron	Teleplay by : Mike Chessler & Chris Alberghini; Story by : Michelle Furtney-Goodman & Conner Good	August 28, 2019	1.94
When the table read serves up major disappointment, the cast band together to try and rewrite the script, but can't come to an agreement on storylines. Meanwhile, Shannen questions her decision to join the reboot.
5	"Picture's Up"	Kabir Akhtar	Teleplay by : Mike Chessler & Chris Alberghini; Story by : Mike Deas & Ben O'Hara	September 4, 2019	1.89
The first day of filming is halted due to a threat, and the cast sets their eyes on a former co-star who may be holding a vendetta against them. Jason's insensitivity while directing causes frustration, and Tori stresses over an upcoming sex scene.
6	"The Long Wait"	Gina Lamar	Teleplay by : Aaron Fullerton and Mike Chessler & Chris Alberghini; Story by : Paul Sciarrotta	September 11, 2019	1.90
As the cast members celebrate the wrap of the pilot, they await news from the network. Ian realises his relationship with Anna might be a little too casual, and Jennie thinks Wyatt might be in too deep. Later, Tori gets frustrated with Nate.

== Production ==
In November 2019, Fox canceled the series after one season.

=== Background and development ===
From 2008 to 2013, a sequel series entitled 90210 aired on The CW. Jennie Garth returned in a heavily recurring role, while Tori Spelling and Shannen Doherty also made appearances and Jason Priestley directed an episode. In December 2013, Ian Ziering stated on Oprah: Where Are They Now? that he had attempted to sell a "loosely scripted" reunion special in which the original cast members appeared as themselves at a dinner party at his house, with a target airdate of September 2, 2010 to commemorate the show's numerical title; however, he failed to find a network interested in buying the project. Ziering indicated that Hulu had expressed interest in a revival series with the original cast in August 2016.

"It's not technically a reboot, because I feel like everyone has seen the reboot. We don't want to be the last ones like doing the reboot thing, and no one wants to see like old versions of ourselves, but they do want to see us playing our characters, so what we're doing is the entire cast is playing heightened versions of themselves. Think Curb Your Enthusiasm episodes, in an hour long show, and we're all playing heightened versions, so it could be fictional, it could be non-fictional, people will have to guess."

— Tori Spelling, on the series concept

In March 2018, it was reported that Garth and Spelling had partnered with CBS Television Studios to produce a 90210-related series in which they would play "exaggerated versions of themselves." The project came out of an initial meeting between Spelling and studio president David Stapf. That December, Garth and Spelling shopped project to several networks and streaming services, and Deadline Hollywood confirmed the return of Priestley, Ziering, Gabrielle Carteris, and Brian Austin Green, as well as Mike Chessler and Chris Alberghini, who created Spelling's sitcom So Notorious and also wrote on the CW's 90210. That same day, CBS Television Studios confirmed the project was still in "early development" and called it "an untraditional take on a reboot with some of the original cast." In February 2019, Deadline reported that Fox, which aired the original series, was among the outlets bidding on the series, with ABC, CBS, and CBS All Access also reportedly interested. On February 27, Fox ordered the six-episode event series, then titled 90210. Its short order reflected a shift in the company's mandate away from a traditional 22-episode order following Disney's acquisition of 20th Television, which rendered Fox as a stand-alone network. According to Spelling, the creative team's intention was to do a continuing series, but the network opted for a limited episodic order so they could expedite production for a summer debut. Since then, both Garth and Spelling have stated they did not know about the shortened episode order until Fox formally announced the series. In April, the series was retitled BH90210.

=== Casting ===
Garth and Spelling, who spearheaded the project, were confirmed to play heightened versions of themselves on March 11, 2018. That December, Priestley, Ziering, Green, and Carteris were confirmed to have signed on, also playing fictionalized versions of themselves. On February 1, 2019, Spelling said that Luke Perry would return for "as many [episodes] as he can do," given his prior commitment to Riverdale, and that there was "no status right now" as to whether Shannen Doherty would return. On March 4, Perry died after suffering a stroke, and had not officially signed on, although he had been involved creatively before his death. On April 26, Doherty's return was confirmed. Doherty has since stated she did not intend to join the show, but did so after Perry's death to honor him.

On May 30, La La Anthony became the first non-alum actor to be cast in the recurring role of Shay, Green's fictionalized wife. The following day on May 31, Vanessa Lachey was cast as Camille, Jason Priestley's fictionalized wife, in a recurring role. On June 5, Ivan Sergei joined the supporting cast as Nate, Spelling's fictionalized husband. Sergei had previously starred with Spelling in the 1996 television film Mother, May I Sleep With Danger?. Christine Elise, who reoccurred on the original series as Emily Valentine, joined the cast on June 17. Upon the series' announcement, Elise reached out to Alberghini and Chessler about joining. On July 15, it was reported that Natalie Sharp has joined the cast as a new character named Anna. Sharp, who dyed her hair red for the role, was cast the day before she began filming. On July 30, Spelling announced that Denise Richards has joined the cast, also portraying a heightened version of herself. Richards had previously appeared on an episode of the original series as Robin McGill, Kelly's cousin. Carol Potter, who starred in the original series as Cindy Walsh, was also reported to be making an appearance.

=== Writing ===
Garth and Spelling developed the idea alongside Alberghini and Chessler. According to Spelling, they wanted to avoid creating a traditional reboot in the vein of the CW series and create "something that would cause noise and be groundbreaking just like [the] original show was back in the ‘90s." Garth and Spelling then approached the original cast about appearing, leading to months of creative conversations to flesh out the concept and develop fictionalized versions of themselves. According to Carteris, some cast members initially disagreed with Garth and Spelling's meta pitch and pushed "for a pure reboot, but that majority, I think, of what brought [the cast] forward was the idea that it wasn't." Ziering noted that the cast left themselves "vulnerable" and open to mining their real lives for storylines, while Garth said the series would lean into the pre-existing perceptions people had about the cast, but "take back the power, spin it and use it to tell these stories was an interesting angle for everyone involved." Priestley noted that while the meta show within a show premise differentiates the series from other reboots, it will still follow some traditional conventions in the current trend of reviving older shows. While the writers looked to other shows with similar concepts, such as Curb Your Enthusiasm and Episodes, as examples, Chessler considered this series more challenging because it featured an entire ensemble playing themselves rather than just one actor. The main cast remained creatively involved in the process and serve as executive producers, On May 16, Paul Sciarrotta was announced as the series' showrunner, replacing Patrick Sean Smith, who left the series alongside two unnamed writers. The writers' departures reportedly stemmed from disagreements with some of the actors and an executive overseeing the project.

The writing staff had one week per episode to break the story and write the script. According to Garth, writing took place concurrently with filming, which allowed for their real life experience on-set to be incorporated into the show's storylines. Initially conceived as a half-hour comedy in the vein of Curb Your Enthusiasm, the series was redeveloped into an hourlong format. Garth described the series as a "soapedy," giving its unique blend of comedy, drama, and soap opera elements. Garth stated the new series would ignore the CW revival, on which she was prominently featured, as they aimed "to move away from that sort of image and go back to the original concept." Sciarrotta said the writers were conscious not to make the dialog pertaining to television production "too inside baseball." Doherty stated Perry's death would be addressed in the first episode. According to Alberghini, the writers and cast scrapped various iterations of acknowledging Perry's passing in the show, before reaching what they felt was the most respectful approach.

=== Filming ===
Filming took place in Vancouver, with production dates from May 21 to July 31, 2019. Principal photography with most of the cast began on May 27, whereas Doherty began filming on June 14. Spelling later confirmed filming would wrap on August 2. Spelling noted that they worked on an abbreviated schedule, with filming taking place as scripts were still being written. Scenes taking place at the fictional West Beverly Hills High School were filmed at Vancouver Technical Secondary School. Because of the show within a show premise, many of the production facilities were used on camera; according to Spelling, their makeup artists and trailers appeared in scenes in which the characters were getting their hair and makeup done. On set, the fictionalized characters were referred to by their initials to avoid confusion from the actors' speaking in the third person. Costume designer Mandi Line collaborated heavily with each actor to develop their wardrobe, which included recreations of specific outfits worn on the original series.

=== Fox cancellation and potential future ===
Though BH90210 was advertised as an event series, Garth and Spelling had indicated that future seasons are possible. They elaborated that future episodes or seasons would "delve into actual scenes" from the show within a show. Ziering revealed that the original pitch suggested 13 episodes, the final of which would have incorporated this concept and would have taken place entirely in the world of the original series. Spelling stated they decided to end the season finale with a cliffhanger, explaining: "In our minds, writing the last episode was foreshadowing another season. Going forward, the second season would be more laser-focused on the reboot."

On November 7, 2019, it was announced that Fox had canceled the series after one season. Michael Thorn, the network's president of entertainment, stated, "To sustain something that meta and heightened in the long-term is incredibly hard. We always kind of envisioned it as an event… So we felt like to do it as a short-term event where you could just catch up with these actors that you love and do something that was wildly different was a great way to honor the legacy of the show." Carteris indicated that the series was being shopped elsewhere, Garth also stated they were working on finding a new network for the show, and added the confusion over its cancellation could help fuel future storylines. In December, Garth stated that discussions of where to take the series were still ongoing, noting that a different iteration of the show or a movie were both possibilities. In June 2020, Spelling reiterated that a second season was unlikely, but that she and Garth were in pre-production on a project to commemorate the original show's 30th anniversary in October. In March 2021, Garth and Spelling stated on their podcast, 9021OMG, that "it was supposed to be at Fox and taking it somewhere else felt[...] a little weird."

== Promotion ==
On May 8, 2019, an announcement trailer was released, depicting the cast reuniting for a table read of the first script. TVLine called the teaser "nostalgia-drenched."

On May 13, the official trailer premiered at the Fox network upfronts presentation, showcasing "the actors themselves going about their daily lives, with Doherty practicing yoga, Spelling making coffee, Garth blow-drying her hair, and more — as the beloved theme song comes back into their lives in unexpected ways." On May 16, Fox reported that the trailer had amassed 18 million views and 140,818 shares across social media platforms in under 69 hours, making it the most-watched and most-shared trailer among all new series for the 2019-20 broadcast television season.

On June 6, another promo was released, depicting the cast playing with authentic dolls modeled after their characters.

On July 11, the first trailer featuring footage from the series was released.

From August 1 to August 3, Fox and PopSugar opened a pop-up restaurant in Los Angeles, modeled after the Peach Pit diner from the original series. Due to high demand, the pop-up was extended through the end of September 2019.

== Reception ==
=== Critical response ===
On review aggregator Rotten Tomatoes, the series holds an approval rating of 69% based on 32 reviews, with an average rating of 6.61/10. The website's critical consensus reads, "Though BH90210's strange take on the 'reboot' doesn't always hit its mark, it still proves an endearingly wild trip thanks to its committed cast's continued chemistry." On Metacritic, it has a weighted average score of 64 out of 100, based on 21 critics, indicating "generally favorable reviews".

Several critics were given the first two episodes to review. Kristen Baldwin of Entertainment Weekly gave the series a 'B' grade in her review, calling it "a poignant and funny meditation on midlife mortality. She also complimented Garth's performance, noting she delivered "comedic asides with unexpected precision." Uproxx's Kimberly Ricci thought the series "presents an interesting (and refreshing) perspective because it kind of hates itself", and praised the performances for their "self-mockery." Judy Berman of Time gave a positive review and praised the series' novel premise, dubbing it "the audiovisual equivalent of a beach read that’s smarter than it needs to be." Anne Easton of Forbes gave the episodes a favorable review, complimenting the "witty, quippy, and snarky" writing and opining that Spelling "matured in her thespian abilities, showing more range in both her comedic, and, well, intentional overdramatic moments." Emily Nussbaum of The New Yorker called the series "just smart enough to feel clever, just silly enough to feel relaxing, a guilty pleasure by design," and praised the performances, particularly that of Carteris, whom Nussbaum identified as a breakout and called "oddly affecting." While Gwen Inhat of The A.V. Club addressed the unevenness of the storylines, she felt the six episodes "somehow[...] pulled off being both a valentine to fans and a send-up of the show they fell for in the first place.

Kelly Lawler of USA Today wrote that although the series does not reach the heights of the original, "in a world in which revivals or remakes of popular stories is inevitable, at least this one is weirdly fun." In a separate review ranking BH90210 among other television reboots, Lawler wrote, "it's just a middling soap opera about slightly washed-up celebrities trying to have one last ride," and placed it at number 14 out of 17 shows. Linda Holmes of NPR called the series "cute" and "strange," and wrote that she found it challenging "to give a proper critique of something [that's] more like a bonus feature on a DVD than anything else." Jen Chaney of Vulture appreciated how the meta take "both earnestly and cynically [takes] aim at your nostalgia pleasure centers," and anticipated the series could have strong binge-watching potential. In his review for The Hollywood Reporter, Daniel Fienberg criticized the "flimsy" execution of the show's premise and the disjointed performances of the cast overall, although he highlighted Garth and Spelling's comedic chemistry, as well as Carteris and Green's performances. Though Willa Paskin of Slate gave the series an "A for effort," she criticized its "try-hard playfulness" and called it "not funny or smart" despite its clever premise. TVLine's Andy Swift was more negative in his review, criticizing the low stakes of the storylines and opining the series "lacks the dramatic intrigue of the original series, but with scripts largely devoid of humor, it doesn’t quite work as a comedy, either." Matthew Gilbert of The Boston Globe felt that the series would be stronger as a half-hour sitcom, and criticized the storylines as "fairly dumb," opining that, "there was little to entice those who tuned in for the premiere, to get a glimpse at everyone, to return for more."

=== Ratings ===
Upon its initial broadcast, the premiere episode drew 3.86 million viewers and scored a 1.5 rating in the 18-49 demographic, making it the second-most watched broadcast of the night, as well as the Fox network's most watched non-sports program of the summer. The premiere was also the summer's most-watched program, more than doubling the ratings of its closest competition, Grand Hotel on ABC.

Subsequent episodes experienced ratings declines, with TVLine reporting that by the fifth episode, the series was performing at 50 percent of its premiere ratings. Overall, BH90210 showed the biggest decline in ratings of all shows airing in the summer season.

According to The Hollywood Reporter, each episode's ratings tended to grow by about 75 percent, in both its demographic and overall viewership, after three days of delayed viewing, which Fox reportedly focuses on instead of live viewings.

Viewership and ratings per episode of BH90210
No.	Title	Air date	Rating/share (18–49)	Viewers (millions)	DVR (18–49)	DVR viewers (millions)	Total (18–49)	Total viewers (millions)
1	"The Reunion"	August 7, 2019	1.5/8	3.86	0.8	1.82	2.3	5.67
2	"The Pitch"	August 14, 2019	1.0/5	2.52	0.8	1.76	1.8	4.28
3	"The Photo Shoot"	August 21, 2019	0.8/4	2.19	0.8	1.68	1.6	3.87
4	"The Table Read"	August 28, 2019	0.7/4	1.94	0.7	1.51	1.4	3.45
5	"Picture's Up"	September 4, 2019	0.6/4	1.89	0.7	1.45	1.4	3.35
6	"The Long Wait"	September 11, 2019	0.7/4	1.90	0.6	1.25	1.3	3.15
