= Trennt Michaud =

Canadian pair skater (born 1996)

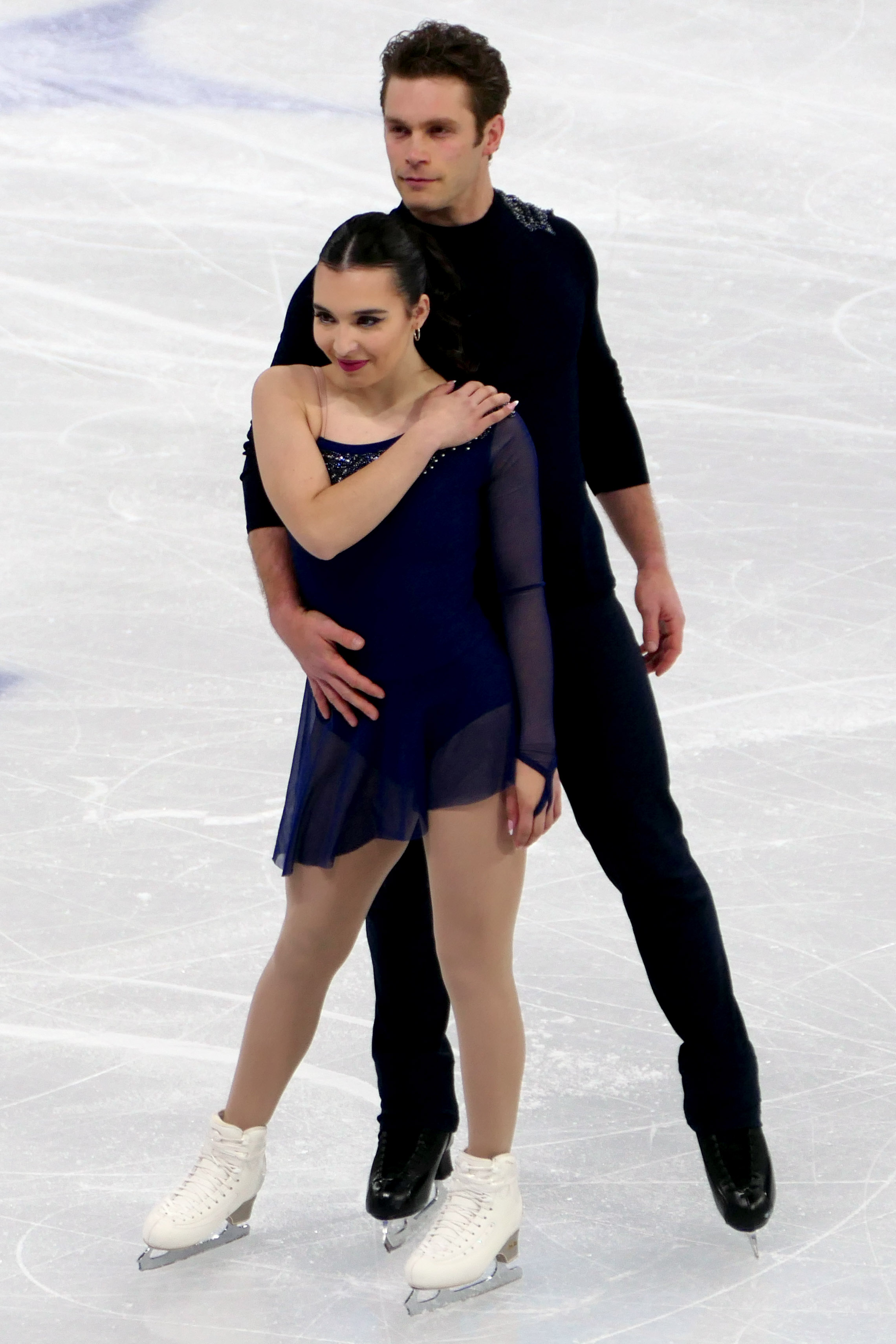
- Lia Pereira and Trennt Michaud at the 2024 World Figure Skating Championships

Personal information
- Born: August 22, 1996 (age 30) Belleville, Ontario, Canada
- Home town: Brantford, Ontario
- Height: 1.76 m (5 ft 9 in)

Figure skating career
- Country: Canada
- Discipline: Pair skating
- Partner: Lia Pereira (since 2022); Evelyn Walsh (2016–22); Hope McLean (2014–16)
- Coach: Alison Purkiss; Nancy Lemaire; Derek Schmidt; Michael Marinaro
- Skating club: Trenton Figure Skating Club
- Began skating: 2004

Medal record
World Championships
Bronze medal – third place	2026 Prague	Pairs
Four Continents Championships
Bronze medal – third place	2022 Tallinn	Pairs
Bronze medal – third place	2025 Seoul	Pairs
Canadian Championships
Gold medal – first place	2026 Gatineau	Pairs
Silver medal – second place	2019 Saint John	Pairs
Silver medal – second place	2020 Mississauga	Pairs
Silver medal – second place	2022 Ottawa	Pairs
Silver medal – second place	2024 Calgary	Pairs
Silver medal – second place	2025 Laval	Pairs
Bronze medal – third place	2023 Oshawa	Pairs

Trennt Michaud (born August 22, 1996) is a Canadian pair skater. With his skating partner, Lia Pereira, he is the 2026 World bronze medalist, 2025 Four Continents bronze medalist, a five-time Grand Prix medalist (2 golds, 2 silvers, 1 bronze), a two-time ISU Challenger Series medalist, and the 2026 Canadian national champion. With Pereira, he represented Canada at the 2026 Winter Olympics.

With his former skating partner, Evelyn Walsh, he is the 2022 Four Continents bronze medallist and a three-time Canadian national silver medallist. Walsh/Michaud also won the 2017 Canadian national junior title and competed at two World Junior Championships, achieving their highest placement, fifth, in 2017.

== Personal life ==
Michaud was born on August 22, 1996, in Belleville, Ontario, Canada. He attended East Northumberland Secondary School in Brighton, Ontario.

== Career ==
=== Early career ===
Michaud started learning to skate in 2004. He competed on the novice level at the 2013 Canadian Championships, placing eighth in men's singles and second in pairs with Judith Murtha-Anderson where they were coached by Lisa Conley and represented the Prince Edward County Skating Club.

His partnership with Hope McLean began in 2014. They won the junior pairs' title at the 2016 Canadian Championships and were sent to the 2016 World Junior Championships in Debrecen, Hungary. They withdrew from Junior Worlds after placing thirteenth in the short program. They were coached by Alison Purkiss and Scott Rachuk in London and Komoka, Ontario.

=== Partnership with Walsh ===
==== 2016–17 season: Canadian junior national title ====
In 2016, Michaud teamed up with Evelyn Walsh, coached by Alison Purkiss and Margaret Purdy in London, Ontario. Making their international debut, they placed eleventh at a Junior Grand Prix (JGP) competition held in late September in Tallinn, Estonia, and fifth the following month at a JGP event in Dresden, Germany. In January 2017, they won the junior pairs' title at the Canadian Championships and were named in Canada's team to the 2017 World Junior Championships in Taipei. Competing in Taiwan, they placed sixth in the short program, fifth in the free skate, and fifth overall.

==== 2017–18 season ====
In the 2017–2018 season, Walsh and Michaud participated in two events on the Junior Grand Prix circuit, winning the bronze medal at JGP Riga Cup and placing fourth at JGP Croatia Cup.

Competing as a senior pair at the 2018 Canadian Championships, they placed fifth overall. At the 2018 World Junior Championships, the pair placed fifth in the short program, sixth in the free skate, and sixth overall.

==== 2018–19 season: Senior international debut ====
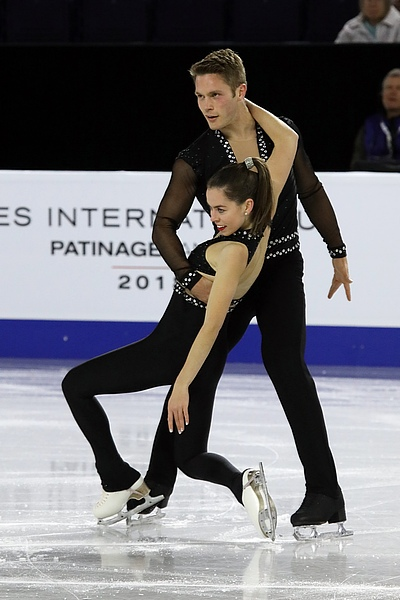
Walsh/Michaud at the 2018 Skate Canada International

Competing as seniors internationally in the 2018-19 season, Walsh/Michaud made their debut on the Challenger series at the Nebelhorn Trophy, where they placed seventh. For the Grand Prix series, Walsh and Michaud were initially assigned to 2018 Skate Canada International and subsequently added to the 2018 Skate America event following the withdrawal of the Chinese team of Li/Xie. They placed eighth at Skate America, following rough programs where Walsh fell five times, but fared better at Skate Canada International, finishing in fifth place.

At the 2019 Canadian Championships, Walsh/Michaud placed second in both programs, winning the silver medal behind Moore-Towers/Marinaro. Walsh, commenting on their struggles at their first two competitions that season, said, "we do truly believe everything happens for a reason." Michaud remarked that their expectations had changed considerably from the previous season when they were happy to finish fifth. They were assigned, alongside Moore-Towers/Marinaro, to compete at the Four Continents and World Championships.

Competing at Four Continents, they were in sixth place after the short program but fell to seventh overall after finishing eighth in the free skate with a performance that included an aborted lift. At the World Championships, they placed twelfth. Walsh and Michaud also worked on the Netflix series Spinning Out, serving as skating doubles for leads Kaya Scodelario and Evan Roderick.

==== 2019–20 season ====
For their free program, Walsh/Michaud worked with retired Canadian pairs champion Eric Radford as choreographer. Walsh/Michaud made their debut at the 2019 CS Finlandia Trophy, where they placed sixth. At the 2019 Skate Canada International, their first Grand Prix assignment, they were eighth. At the 2019 Rostelecom Cup, they were fifth in the short program with a new personal best. Seventh in the free skate, they were sixth overall.

Following the conclusion of the Grand Prix series, Walsh and Michaud consulted with 2014 Olympic pairs champion Maxim Trankov to improve pair elements, in particular their triple twist lift. Skating at the 2020 Canadian Championships, they placed third in the short program, less than a point behind second-place Ilyushechkina/Bilodeau. Second in the free skate despite some under rotations on their jumps, they won their second consecutive national silver medal. Walsh called it"the peak, I think, of our season so far, and this is exactly where we wanted to be at this point."

Walsh/Michaud placed sixth at the 2020 Four Continents Championships, again ahead of Ilyushechkina/Bilodeau. Consequently, they were afterwards assigned to Canada's second pairs berth at the 2020 World Championships in Montreal. However, the championships were cancelled as a result of the coronavirus pandemic.

==== 2020–21 season ====
After the initial lockdowns, Walsh and Michaud were among the elite athletes who were cleared to train through future lockdowns. Walsh/Michaud were assigned to the 2020 Skate Canada International, but this event was also cancelled as a result of the pandemic. The team was scheduled to participate in the virtual Skate Canada Challenge in December, but Walsh sprained her ankle and was off the ice for two weeks, causing them to miss the filming period.

Despite this, on February 25th, Walsh and Michaud were announced as part of the Canadian team to the 2021 World Championships in Stockholm. They placed twelfth at the World Championships.

==== 2021–22 season: Four Continents bronze ====
Walsh/Michaud's outlook heading into the Olympic season was complicated by the decision of their erstwhile choreographer, former World champion Eric Radford, to return to competition alongside new partner Vanessa James. With only two Canadian pairs berths available for the 2022 Winter Olympics, there was projected to be a fight amongst the top three Canadian teams. Walsh said, "anyone can come back into a sport. It's nothing against them. At the same time, we feel we're in a position to earn that Olympic spot, and that's what we’re chasing this year."

The team was scheduled to debut competitively at the 2021 CS Autumn Classic International but withdrew after Walsh came down with a chest infection that required two courses of antibiotics as treatment. At their first Grand Prix, 2021 Skate America, they placed eighth of eight teams. They were sixth of seven teams at the 2021 NHK Trophy, their second assignment.

At the 2022 Canadian Championships, Walsh/Michaud greatly improved on their performances earlier in the season and took the silver medal with second-place finishes in both segments. With Moore-Towers/Marinaro taking the gold medal, it was perceived that the choice for the second berth on the Canadian Olympic team would come down to Walsh/Michaud or James/Radford. The latter had withdrawn from the championships after placing fourth in the short program, having had limited training in the preceding weeks due to both skaters having COVID-19. The following day, the Canadian federation named James/Radford to the second spot. This choice was controversial, with many arguing that Walsh/Michaud had earned the assignment.

Walsh/Michaud were assigned to compete at the 2022 Four Continents Championships in Tallinn, where they placed second in the short program, taking a silver small medal. They dropped to third place in the free skate after jump and lift errors, winning the bronze medal overall. Michaud said afterwards that they had "been skating so well and training so well, and we're just disappointed that we couldn't fully show all of that today."

While the team's season was originally meant to be over, longtime training partners Moore-Towers/Marinaro withdrew from the 2022 World Championships due to Moore-Towers' mental health, and first alternates Walsh/Michaud were activated. As a result of the Russian invasion of Ukraine, the International Skating Union banned all Russian and Belarusian skaters from competing at the World Championships. As well, the Chinese Skating Association opted not to send athletes to compete in Montpellier. As those countries' athletes comprised the entirety of the top five pairs at the Olympics, this greatly impacted the field. Walsh/Michaud placed eighth in the short program, sixth in the free skate, and sixth overall. Their placement, combined with the bronze medal for James/Radford, earned Canada three spots at the next year's championships.

==== End of partnership ====
Walsh and Michaud had been assigned to compete on the Grand Prix for the 2022–23 season, but on August 5, it was announced that she had decided to retire and focus on her university studies, while Michaud would seek to carry on with a new partner.

=== Partnership with Pereira ===
==== 2022–23 season ====
Following a search, Michaud formed a new partnership with singles skater Lia Pereira. They made their competitive debut at the Skate Ontario sectional qualifier in November, winning the gold medal. Pereira/Michaud went on to win the final national qualifying event, Skate Canada Challenge. Pereira said afterwards that they were "just growing together, and each competition is a new learning experience." Shortly after that, they were assigned to make their international debut at the 2022 CS Golden Spin of Zagreb. Fourth after the short program, they rose to third place in the free skate, winning the bronze medal and securing the international minimum scores to compete at future ISU championships.

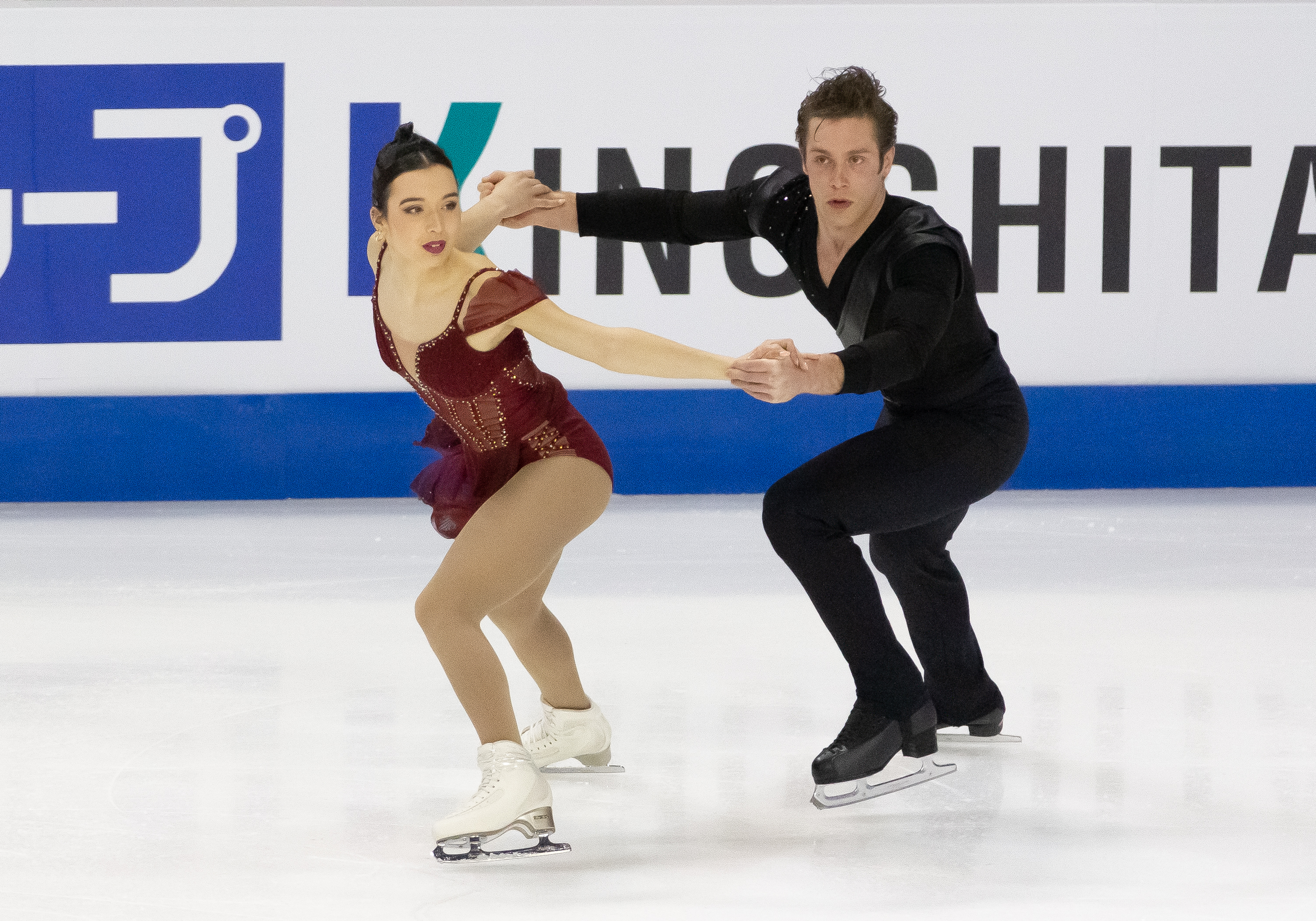
Pereira/Michaud at the 2023 Four Continents Championships

Pereira/Michaud attended their first Canadian Championships, an event that was noteworthy as Pereira opted to continue competing in the women's event as well. They placed fourth in the short program, 1.01 points back of third-place Laurin/Éthier. They rose to third place after the free skate, winning the bronze medal, despite Michaud making errors on both of his jumping passes. He said he was "a little upset with myself" for those mistakes, but added there were still "lots of positive outcomes." They were named to the Canadian teams for both the 2023 Four Continents and World championships.

At the Four Continents Championships in Colorado Springs, Pereira/Michaud placed fourth in the short program with a clean skate. They were fourth in the free skate as well, the only error being Michaud doubling their planned triple Salchow. They both indicated that they were pleased with how the competition had gone, as they continued to gain experience. Concluding their season at the 2023 World Championships in Saitama, Pereira/Michaud ranked sixth overall, the same ordinal that Michaud had achieved with Walsh the previous year. This included a notable fourth-place finish in the free skate segment of the competition. Michaud said that their "short season has been amazing."

==== 2023–24 season ====
At their first competition, the 2023 CS Nebelhorn Trophy, Pereira/Michaud came fourth, 0.07 points behind German bronze medalists Hocke/Kunkel. She commented after that the "whole experience was really enjoyable and we’re happy with both of our programs and the outcome."

Pereira and Michaud were invited to make their Grand Prix debut at the 2023 Skate America. She remarked on the occasion that "this time last year I was watching the Skate America pairs event to learn the pair rules, so to be here is pretty cool." They skated a clean short program, placing second in the segment. They were second in the free skate as well, despite Pereira botching her jump combination and putting a foot down on a throw jump, winning the silver medal. At their second assignment, the 2023 Grand Prix de France, Pereira/Michaud skated a clean short program with a new personal best score of 65.97, coming 0.66 ahead of the pre-event favourites, reigning European champions Conti/Macii of Italy. In the free skate, Michaud fell on the end of his jump combination and stepped out of his triple Salchow, but the team still set another personal best to win that segment as well, taking their first Grand Prix gold medal. Michaud said that "to know that what we've been putting into it is paying off is a super rewarding feeling" and added they "still have things to improve on.”

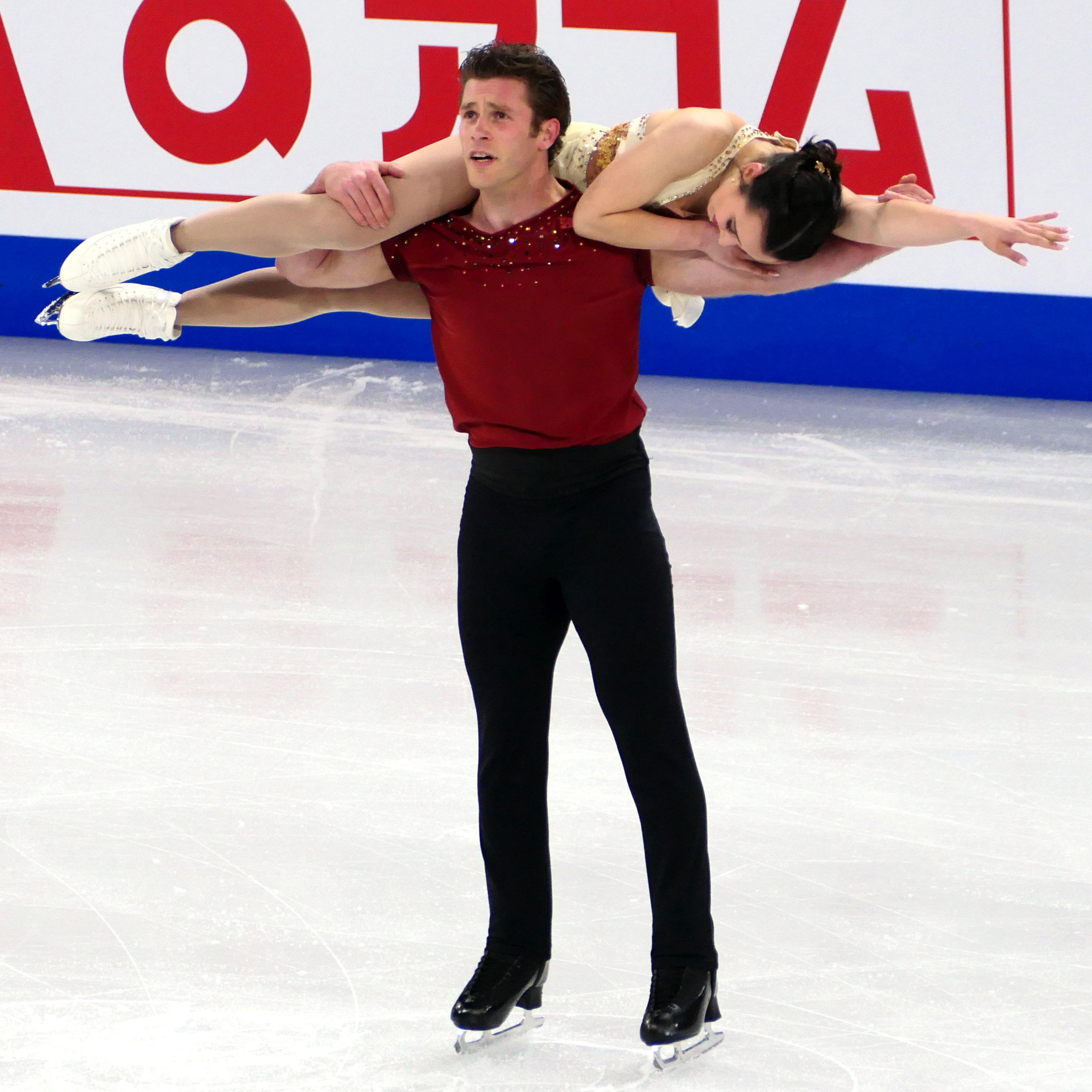
Pereira and Michaud in the ending pose for their free skate at the 2024 World Championships

The team's results qualified them to the 2023–24 Grand Prix Final in Beijing. Pereira/Michaud finished sixth in the short program after Pereira fell on their throw jump, which she called an "untypical" error. They were sixth in the free skate as well after a lift error, which Michaud said he was "annoyed" by, but "overall, we are pretty pleased." Pereira viewed it as a new experience for the team to be coming back after a disappointing short program.

Following the conclusion of the Grand Prix series, Pereira and Michaud opted to revise their "River" short program to a softer version with different choreography, based on feedback from judges and other coaches. They finished narrowly second in the short program at the 2024 Canadian Championships, narrowly behind reigning national champions Stellato-Dudek/Deschamps. Jump and throw issues in the free skate saw them more distantly second in that segment, winning the silver medal.

Michaud injured his back shortly after the national championships, limiting the team's training heading into the 2024 Four Continents Championships, where they finished fifth after performing "downgraded" content in the free skate.

At the 2024 World Championships, held on home ice in Montreal, Pereira/Michaud placed ninth in the short program, having skated cleanly but receiving only a level 1 on the triple twist. In the free skate, despite Pereira falling on a throw landing, they were seventh in the segment, moving up to eighth overall. Pereira called the fall "quite disappointing, just because we hoped for such a great moment, but there's still a lot of great things I can take away from this. It's an experience I'll remember forever."

==== 2024–25 season ====
Pereira/Michaud began the season at the 2024 CS Nebelhorn Trophy. They struggled in the short program, coming seventh in that segment, but came third in the free skate and rose to fifth overall. On the 2024–25 Grand Prix circuit, the team entered the 2024 Grand Prix de France as the defending champions, which Pereira cited as a new experience. Third in the short program with a clean performance, the free skate proved more difficult, with her falling on both throw jumps. They dropped to fifth overall. At their second assignment, the 2024 Cup of China, they fared better, placing third in both segments (including a new personal best in the short program) and winning the bronze medal. Pereira called it a "steppingstone" week.

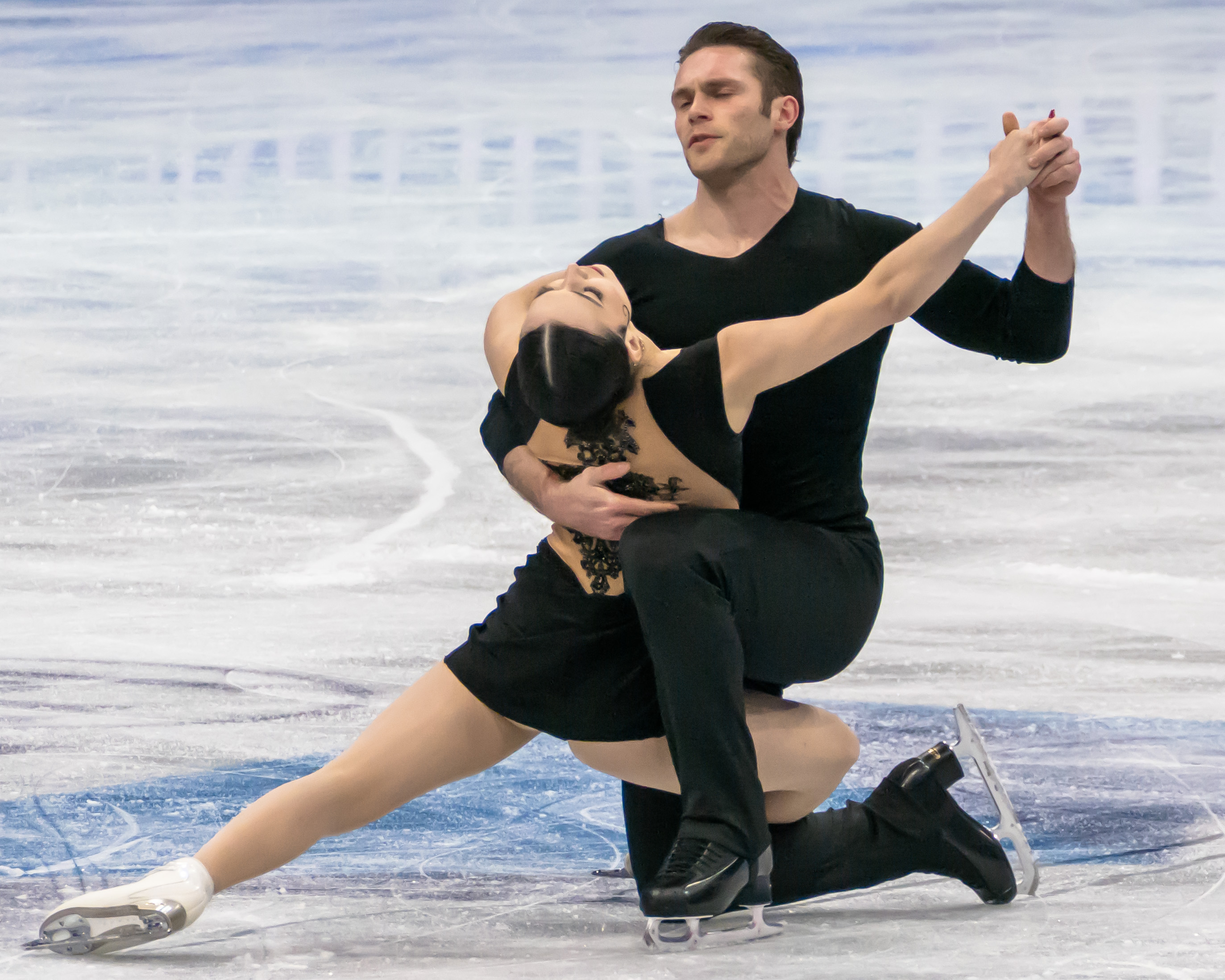
Pereira and Michaud finishing their free skate at the 2025 World Championships

At the 2025 Canadian Championships, Pereira/Michaud came second in the short program behind reigning champions Stellato-Dudek/Deschamps. Scoring 70.43 points, it their first time breaking the 70-point threshold at either domestic or international competition. They went on to win the free skate over Stellato-Dudek/Deschamps, despite a throw fall, but remained second overall and won their second consecutive silver medal.

Upon arrival in Seoul, South Korea for the 2025 Four Continents Championships, Pereira became "violently sick" and was unable to participate in the first practice session. She felt able to compete, and Pereira/Michaud placed third in the short program with a clean skate, only 0.13 points clear of Stellato-Dudek/Deschamps in fourth and 0.53 points back of Americans Kam/O'Shea in second. They were third in the free skate as well, being overtaken by their Canadian teammates but themselves surpassing the Americans, and won the bronze medal with a new personal best score of 198.40. This was Michaud's second international championship medal, and the first for his partnership with Pereira.

Going on to compete at the 2025 World Championships in Boston, Massachusetts, United States, Perreira/Michaud placed tenth in the short program and thirteenth in the free skate, finishing the event in eleventh place overall.

Reflecting on the season, Perreira shared, "We, of course, learned so much this year. You learn from your wins, and you also learn from your losses. Every competition is experience gained, and that’s something we really enjoy, growing from every opportunity we have."

==== 2025–26 season ====
Pereira/Michaud opened their season by placing sixth at the 2025 CS Nebelhorn Trophy. They then went on to compete on the 2025–26 Grand Prix series, placing fourth at 2025 Skate Canada International and fifth at the 2025 Finlandia Trophy.

In January, Pereira/Michaud competed at the 2026 Canadian Championships. They placed second in the short program and following an error-ridden free skate by heavy favourites, Stellato-Dudek/Deschamps, Pereira/Michaud won the free skate segment and won the gold medal overall. They were subsequently named to the 2026 Winter Olympic team.

On February 2, days before the start of the 2026 Winter Olympics Figure Skating Team Event, the Canadian Olympic Committee announced that Stellato-Dudek/Deschamps would be unable to participate due to Stellato-Dudek sustaining an injury during training. As a result, Pereira/Michaud were selected to compete for Team Canada in the pairs portion of that event. On February 6, they placed fourth in the short program. “We really put in a lot of work,” said Pereira. “I think today showed the work that we put in the usual elements that gave us some problems," said Pereira. "Overall, I’m proud of both of us for handling our first team event together. We really felt the support from the box and the crowd.”

The following month Pereira/Michaud captured the bronze medal at the 2026 World Figure Skating Championships. They finished third in the short program and second in the free skate. “Those two programs are some of our favorite programs we’ve ever had,” said Michaud. “To finish both on such a high note was exactly what we came here to do. We knew if we did that, we could put ourselves into medal contention. I’m so proud of the two of us and also our team back home."

=== 2026–27 season ===
In October, they won gold at 2026 Skate Canada International. “We’re very pleased with both our performances at Skate Canada,” said Pereira after the event.

The following month, they placed second at 2026 Finlandia Trophy. “We’ve been experimenting with different setups for our throws and jumps, trying to figure out what gives us the best GOE and the best angle for the judges,” said Pereira of their programs.

Their combined placements at their two Grand Prix events qualified them for the 2026–27 Grand Prix of Figure Skating Final.

== Programs ==
=== Pair skating with Lia Pereira ===
Season	Short program	Free skating	Exhibition
2025–2026	Say You Love Me by Jessie Ware choreo. by Madison Hubbell, Adrián Díaz, Alison Purkiss	Gladiator; The Emperor is Dead; The Might of Rome; Honor Him; Now We Are Free by Hans Zimmer & Lisa Gerrard choreo. by Madison Hubbell, Adrián Díaz, Alison Purkiss; The Mission; Gabriel's Oboe; Miserere; River; Guarani; Falls; The Mission (Main Theme) by Ennio Morricone; Prayer of the Fall by Karl Hugo choreo. by Jean-Luc Baker, Olivia Smart, Alison Purkiss	Be Italian (from Nine) performed by Fergie
2024–2025	Sing, Sing, Sing (with a Swing) by Louis Prima performed by Anita O'Day choreo. by Jean-Luc Baker, Olivia Smart, Alison Purkiss	Tango Jalousie by Jacob Gade performed by Sakari Oramo & Vienna Philharmonic; Por una cabeza (from Scent of a Woman) by Carlos Gardel & Alfredo Le Pera performed by John Williams, Itzhak Perlman, & Pittsburgh Symphony Orchestra; Tango Jalousie by Jacob Gade performed by Sakari Oramo & Vienna Philharmonic choreo. by Madison Hubbell, Adrián Díaz, Alison Purkiss	Sparkling Diamonds (from Moulin Rouge!) performed by Nicole Kidman
2023–2024	River by Bishop Briggs choreo. by Alison Purkiss, Asher Hill	Gladiator; The Emperor is Dead; The Might of Rome; Honor Him; Now We Are Free by Hans Zimmer & Lisa Gerrard choreo. by Madison Hubbell, Adrián Díaz, Alison Purkiss	Stick Season by Noah Kahan; Lift Me Up (from Black Panther: Wakanda Forever) by Rihanna
2022–2023	Where We Come Alive by Ruelle choreo. by Alison Purkiss	Singapore; Drink Up Me Hearties Yo Ho (from Pirates of the Caribbean) by Hans Zimmer choreo. by Alison Purkiss	Goo Goo Muck by The Cramps; Bloody Mary by Lady Gaga

=== With Walsh ===
Season	Short program	Free skating	Exhibition
2021–2022	Lost Without You by Freya Ridings choreo. by Alison Purkiss	Dreaming with a Broken Heart by John Mayer choreo. by Carol Lane, Juris Razgulajevs	
2020–2021	Someone You Loved by Lewis Capaldi choreo. by Alison Purkiss	Vai Vedrai (from Cirque du Soleil) choreo. by Eric Radford	
2019–2020	Someone You Loved by Lewis Capaldi choreo. by Alison Purkiss; Bennie and the Jets by Elton John choreo. by Alison Purkiss	One by U2 performed by Cinematic Pop choreo. by Eric Radford	Bennie and the Jets by Elton John choreo. by Alison Purkiss
2018—2019	Come Together by The Beatles choreo. by Alison Purkiss	Romeo & Juliet by Abel Korzeniowski choreo. by Alison Purkiss	Show Me How You Burlesque (from Burlesque by Christina Aguilera
2017–2018	Take It All by Maury Yeston choreo. by Alison Purkiss; The Light That Never Fails by Andra Day choreo. by Alison Purkiss	Can't Help Falling in Love by Hugo Pereth choreo. by Alison Purkiss	Instead
2016–2017	El Tango de Roxanne by Mariano Mores choreo. by Alison Purkiss	Rise Up by Andra Day choreo. by Alison Purkiss	

=== With McLean ===
Season	Short program	Free skating
2015–2016	Writing's on the Wall by Sam Smith	Come What May (from Moulin Rouge!)
2014–2015	Ghost of Stephen Foster by Squirrel Nut Zippers	West Side Story by Leonard Bernstein

== Competitive highlights ==
- GP – Event of the ISU Grand Prix Series
- JGP – Event of the ISU Junior Grand Prix Series
- CS – Event of the ISU Challenger Series
- TBD – Assigned
- WD – Withdrew from competition
- C – Event was cancelled

=== Pair skating with Lia Pereira ===
Competition placements at senior level
Season	2022–23	2023–24	2024–25	2025–26	2026–27
Winter Olympics				8th	
Winter Olympics (Team event)				5th	
World Championships	6th	8th	11th	3rd	
Four Continents Championships	4th	5th	3rd		
Grand Prix Final		6th			TBD
Canadian Championships	3rd	2nd	2nd	1st	
GP Cup of China			3rd		
GP Finland				5th	2nd
GP France		1st	5th		
GP Skate America		2nd			
GP Skate Canada				4th	1st
CS Golden Spin of Zagreb	3rd				
CS Nebelhorn Trophy		4th	5th	6th	1st
Skate Canada Challenge	1st				

=== Pair skating with Evelyn Walsh ===
Competition placements at senior level
Season	2017–18	2018–19	2019–20	2020–21	2021–22
World Championships		12th	C	12th	6th
Four Continents Championships		7th	6th		3rd
Canadian Championships	5th	2nd	2nd	C	2nd
GP NHK Trophy					6th
GP Rostelecom Cup			6th		
GP Skate America		8th			8th
GP Skate Canada		5th	8th	C	
CS Finlandia Trophy			6th		
CS Golden Spin of Zagreb					9th
CS Nebelhorn Trophy		7th			
Skate Canada Challenge	2nd	1st	1st		

Competition placements at junior level
Season	2016–17	2017–18
World Junior Championships	5th	6th
Canadian Championships	1st	
JGP Croatia		4th
JGP Estonia	11th	
JGP Germany	5th	
JGP Latvia		3rd
Bavarian Open	1st	
Skate Canada Challenge	1st	

=== Pair skating with Hope McLean ===
Competition placements at junior level
Season	2014–15	2015–16
World Junior Championships		WD
Canadian Championships	4th	1st
JGP Germany	5th	
JGP Poland		6th

== Detailed results ==
=== Pair skating with Lia Pereira ===
ISU personal best scores in the +5/-5 GOE System
Segment	Type	Score	Event
Total	TSS	216.09	2026 World Championships
Short program	TSS	77.06	2026 Skate Canada International
Short program	TES	43.75	2026 Skate Canada International
Short program	PCS	33.31	2026 Skate Canada International
Free skating	TSS	140.57	2026 World Championships
Free skating	TES	71.73	2026 World Championships
Free skating	PCS	68.84	2026 World Championships

Results in the 2022–23 season
Date	Event	SP		FS		Total	
Date	Event	P	Score	P	Score	P	Score
Nov 30 – Dec 3, 2022	2023 Skate Canada Challenge	2	61.49	1	120.73	1	182.22
Dec 7–10, 2022	(Croatia) 2022 CS Golden Spin of Zagreb	4	61.13	3	115.75	3	176.88
Jan 9–15, 2023	(Canada) 2023 Canadian Championships	4	64.60	3	111.93	3	176.53
Feb 7–12, 2023	(United States) 2023 Four Continents Championships	4	65.31	4	127.69	4	193.00
Mar 20–26, 2023	(Japan) 2023 World Championships	6	65.31	4	127.69	6	193.00

Results in the 2023–24 season
Date	Event	SP		FS		Total	
Date	Event	P	Score	P	Score	P	Score
Sep 20–23, 2023	(Germany) 2023 CS Nebelhorn Trophy	4	62.38	2	126.56	4	188.94
Oct 20–22, 2023	(United States) 2023 Skate America	2	63.22	2	119.37	2	182.59
Nov 3–5, 2023	2023 Grand Prix de France	1	65.97	1	128.70	1	194.67
Dec 7–10, 2023	(China) 2023–24 Grand Prix Final	6	61.78	6	123.38	6	185.16
Jan 8–14, 2024	(Canada) 2024 Canadian Championships	2	66.04	2	127.10	2	193.14
Jan 30 – Feb 4, 2024	(China) 2024 Four Continents Championships	6	59.89	5	122.16	5	182.05
Mar 18–24, 2024	(Canada) 2024 World Championships	9	64.83	7	122.10	8	186.93

Results in the 2024–25 season
Date	Event	SP		FS		Total	
Date	Event	P	Score	P	Score	P	Score
Sep 18–21, 2024	(Germany) 2024 CS Nebelhorn Trophy	7	57.04	3	119.24	5	176.28
Nov 1–3, 2024	2024 Grand Prix de France	3	64.38	5	106.29	5	170.67
Nov 22–24, 2024	2024 Cup of China	3	66.9	3	121.84	3	188.74
Jan 14–19, 2025	(Canada) 2025 Canadian Championships	2	70.43	1	134.53	2	204.96
Feb 19–23, 2025	(South Korea) 2025 Four Continents Championships	3	69.79	3	128.61	3	198.40
Mar 25–30, 2025	(United States) 2025 World Championships	10	63.28	13	116.22	11	179.50

Results in the 2025–26 season
Date	Event	SP		FS		Total	
Date	Event	P	Score	P	Score	P	Score
Sep 25–27, 2025	(Germany) 2025 CS Nebelhorn Trophy	11	60.35	5	123.22	6	183.57
Oct 31 – Nov 2, 2025	2025 Skate Canada International	3	70.66	5	115.88	4	186.54
Nov 21–22, 2025	(Finland) 2025 Finlandia Trophy	4	70.13	6	121.20	5	191.33
Feb 6–8, 2026	(Italy) 2026 Winter Olympics – Team event	4	68.24	5	134.42	5	—N/a
Feb 6–19, 2026	(Italy) 2026 Winter Olympics	3	74.60	10	125.06	8	199.86
Mar 24–29, 2026	(Czech Republic) 2026 World Championships	3	75.52	2	140.57	3	216.09

Results in the 2026–27 season
Date	Event	SP		FS		Total	
Date	Event	P	Score	P	Score	P	Score
Sep 24–26, 2026	(Germany) 2026 CS Nebelhorn Trophy	1	74.70	1	119.78	1	194.48
Oct 30 - Nov 1, 2026	2026 Skate Canada International	1	77.06	1	125.11	1	202.17

=== Pair skating with Evelyn Walsh ===
ISU personal best scores in the +5/-5 GOE System
Segment	Type	Score	Event
Total	TSS	179.70	2022 Four Continents Championships
Short program	TSS	65.42	2022 Four Continents Championships
Short program	TES	35.33	2022 Four Continents Championships
Short program	PCS	30.09	2022 Four Continents Championships
Free skating	TSS	116.83	2021 World Championships
Free skating	TES	58.43	2021 World Championships
Free skating	PCS	59.66	2022 Four Continents Championships

ISU personal best scores in the +3/-3 GOE System
Segment	Type	Score	Event
Total	TSS	158.96	2018 World Junior Championships
Short program	TSS	55.31	2018 World Junior Championships
Short program	TES	30.69	2017 World Junior Championships
Short program	PCS	24.80	2018 World Junior Championships
Free skating	TSS	103.65	2018 World Junior Championships
Free skating	TES	53.07	2017 JGP Latvia
Free skating	PCS	51.78	2018 World Junior Championships

- Small medals for the short program and free skating are only awarded at ISU Championships.

==== Senior level ====
Results in the 2017–18 season
Date	Event	SP		FS		Total	
Date	Event	P	Score	P	Score	P	Score
Nov 29 – Dec 3, 2017	2018 Skate Canada Challenge	2	62.30	2	114.60	2	176.90
Jan 8–14, 2018	(Canada) 2018 Canadian Championships	5	62.61	5	120.26	5	182.87

Results in the 2018–19 season
Date	Event	SP		FS		Total	
Date	Event	P	Score	P	Score	P	Score
Sep 26–29, 2018	(Germany) 2018 CS Nebelhorn Trophy	5	51.85	7	101.86	7	153.71
Oct 19–21, 2018	(United States) 2018 Skate America	8	44.71	8	84.35	8	129.06
Oct 26–28, 2018	2018 Skate Canada International	6	59.59	6	112.94	5	172.53
Nov 28 – Dec 2, 2018	2019 Skate Canada Challenge	2	56.24	1	104.42	1	160.66
Jan 13–20, 2019	(Canada) 2019 Canadian Championships	2	65.20	2	124.67	2	187.87
Feb 7–10, 2019	(United States) 2019 Four Continents Championships	6	61.91	8	97.14	7	159.05
Mar 18–24, 2019	(Japan) 2019 World Championships	12	59.84	12	114.56	12	174.40

Results in the 2018–19 season
Date	Event	SP		FS		Total	
Date	Event	P	Score	P	Score	P	Score
Oct 11–13, 2019	(Finland) 2019 CS Finlandia Trophy	8	48.03	6	103.69	6	151.72
Oct 25–27, 2019	2019 Skate Canada International	8	56.09	7	108.57	8	164.66
Nov 15–17, 2019	(Russia) 2019 Rostelecom Cup	5	62.76	7	106.20	6	168.96
Nov 27 – Dec 1, 2019	2020 Skate Canada Challenge	2	63.04	2	116.34	2	179.38
Jan 13–19, 2020	(Canada) 2020 Canadian Championships	3	70.34	2	125.95	2	196.29
Feb 4–9, 2020	(South Korea) 2020 Four Continents Championships	6	62.97	6	114.61	6	177.58

Results in the 2020–21 season
Date	Event	SP		FS		Total	
Date	Event	P	Score	P	Score	P	Score
Mar 22–28, 2021	(Sweden) 2021 World Championships	12	59.41	12	116.83	12	176.24

Results in the 2021–22 season
Date	Event	SP		FS		Total	
Date	Event	P	Score	P	Score	P	Score
Oct 22–24, 2021	(United States) 2021 Skate America	8	54.03	8	93.58	8	147.61
Nov 12–14, 2021	(Japan) 2021 NHK Trophy	6	56.97	6	111.01	6	167.98
Dec 7–11, 2021	(Croatia) 2021 CS Golden Spin of Zagreb	8	59.31	10	109.56	9	168.87
Jan 6–12, 2022	(Canada) 2022 Canadian Championships	2	66.88	2	119.64	2	186.52
Jan 18–23, 2022	(Estonia) 2022 Four Continents Championships	2	65.42	3	114.28	3	179.70
Mar 21–27, 2022	(France) 2022 World Championships	8	60.28	6	115.74	6	176.02

==== Junior level ====
Results in the 2016–17 season
Date	Event	SP		FS		Total	
Date	Event	P	Score	P	Score	P	Score
Sep 28 – Oct 1, 2016	2016 JGP Estonia	9	46.46	11	76.37	11	122.83
Oct 5–8, 2016	2016 JGP Germany	8	49.02	5	94.90	5	143.92
Nov 30 – Dec 4, 2017	2018 Skate Canada Challenge	1	56.04	1	95.86	1	151.90
Jan 16–22, 2017	(Canada) 2017 Canadian Championships (Junior)	1	56.22	1	99.51	1	155.73
Feb 14–19, 2017	(Germany) 2017 Bavarian Open	2	55.26	1	100.24	1	155.50
Mar 15–19, 2017	(Taiwan) 2017 World Junior Championships	6	51.93	5	98.81	5	150.74

Results in the 2017–18 season
Date	Event	SP		FS		Total	
Date	Event	P	Score	P	Score	P	Score
Sep 6–9, 2017	2017 JGP Latvia	5	50.15	1	103.58	3	153.73
Sep 27–30, 2017	2017 JGP Croatia	7	49.12	4	101.20	4	150.32
Feb 14–25, 2018	(Bulgaria) 2018 World Junior Championships	5	55.31	6	103.65	6	158.96

=== Pair skating with Hope McLean ===
ISU personal best scores in the +3/-3 GOE System
Segment	Type	Score	Event
Total	TSS	128.42	2015 JGP Poland
Short program	TSS	45.35	2015 JGP Poland
Short program	TES	25.01	2015 JGP Poland
Short program	PCS	20.97	2016 World Junior Championships
Free skating	TSS	84.46	2014 JGP Germany
Free skating	TES	41.47	2014 JGP Germany
Free skating	PCS	43.03	2015 JGP Poland

==== Junior level ====
Results in the 2014–15 season
Date	Event	SP		FS		Total	
Date	Event	P	Score	P	Score	P	Score
Oct 1–5, 2014	2014 JGP Germany	7	41.61	4	84.46	5	126.07
Jan 19–25, 2015	(Canada) 2015 Canadian Championships (Junior)	2	42.74	4	76.38	4	119.12

Results in the 2015–16 season
Date	Event	SP		FS		Total	
Date	Event	P	Score	P	Score	P	Score
Sep 23–25, 2015	2015 JGP Poland	7	45.35	6	83.07	6	128.42
Jan 18–24, 2016	(Canada) 2016 Canadian Championships (Junior)	1	54.30	1	100.15	1	154.45
Mar 14–20, 2016	(Hungary) 2016 World Junior Championships	13	44.05	–	–	–	WD
