= Spinning Out =

2020 American drama television series

- Genre: Drama
- Created by: Samantha Stratton
- Starring: Kaya Scodelario; Willow Shields; Evan Roderick; David James Elliott; Sarah Wright Olsen; Svetlana Efremova; Amanda Zhou; Mitchell Edwards; Kaitlyn Leeb; Will Kemp; January Jones
- Music by: Brendan Canning and Chad Benchetrit
- Country of origin: United States
- Original language: English
- No. of seasons: 1
- No. of episodes: 10

Production
- Executive producers: Elizabeth Allen Rosenbaum; Lance Samuels; Daniel Iron; Armand Leo; Joby Harold; Tory Tunnell; Lara Olsen; Samantha Stratton
- Producers: Elizabeth Peterson; Derek S. Rappaport
- Cinematography: Miroslaw Baszak
- Editor: Ben Wilkinson
- Running time: 44–56 minutes
- Production companies: Just a Second; Baby Know It All; Safehouse Pictures

Original release
- Network: Netflix
- Release: January 1, 2020

Spinning Out is an American drama television series, created by Samantha Stratton, that premiered on Netflix on January 1, 2020. In February 2020, the series was canceled after one season.

The series stars Kaya Scodelario as Kat Baker, a young ice skater who suffers a serious injury and is given the opportunity to restart her career as a pairs skater all while hiding her family's history of mental illness. The series follows the Baker family along with Kat's partner Justin Davis and his family.

== Premise ==
Spinning Out follows Kat Baker, an up-and-coming, high-level single skater who is about to turn in her skates after a disastrous fall took her off the competition track. When Kat seizes an opportunity to continue her career as a pair skater with a talented bad-boy partner, she risks exposing a fiercely kept secret that could unravel her entire life. On and off the ice, Kat and her new partner will face daunting odds, injury to body and soul, financial sacrifice, and even potential mental breakdown on their way to realizing their Olympic dream."

== Cast and characters ==
=== Main ===
- Kaya Scodelario as Kat Baker, a competitive ice skater secretly struggling with bipolar disorder
- Willow Shields as Serena Baker, Kat's younger half-sister
- Evan Roderick as Justin Davis, a pair skater from a wealthy family who cannot keep a partner and has a bad boy reputation.
- David James Elliott as James Davis, Justin, Reid and Drew's father
- Sarah Wright Olsen as Mandy Davis, Justin, Reid and Drew's stepmother and James's second wife
- Svetlana Efremova as Dasha Fedorova, Justin and Kat's coach
- Amanda Zhou as Jenn Yu, Kat's best friend and a fellow figure skater
- Mitchell Edwards as Marcus Holmes, Kat's friend and co-worker
- Kaitlyn Leeb as Leah Starnes, a new skater who was supposed to partner with Justin
- Will Kemp as Mitch Saunders, Serena's coach
- January Jones as Carol Baker, Kat and Serena's mother who also has bipolar disorder and was once a figure skater herself

=== Recurring ===
- Jamie Champagne as Drew Davis, Justin's brother and Reid's twin
- Jon Champagne as Reid Davis, Justin's brother and Drew's twin
- Johnny Weir as Gabriel Richardson, Leah's pairs partner
- Zahra Bentham as Alana
- Morgan Kelly as Reggie, Serena's father
- Oscar Hsu as Peter Yu, Jenn's father
- Will Bowes as Brent Fisher, Marcus's friend
- Charlie Hewson as Dr. Parker
- Eli Brown as Dave, Kat's ex-boyfriend in the beginning

== Episodes ==
No.	Title	Directed by	Written by	Original release date
1	"Now Entering Sun Valley"	Elizabeth Allen Rosenbaum	Samantha Stratton	January 1, 2020
In Idaho competitive ice figure skater Kat Baker (Kaya Scodelario) suffers a head injury during a competition. The injury forces her to adjust her dreams away from competitive skating and towards coaching just as her younger sister, Serena is about to enter senior level competition. Kat fails her exams but is offered an opportunity to enter pairs skating as the partner of Justin, a wealthy skater whose partner injures herself during practice. Kat declines and makes plans to move to London with her boyfriend instead.
2	"Welcome to the Family"	Elizabeth Allen Rosenbaum	Samantha Stratton	January 1, 2020
Kat changes her mind about going to London and decides to partner with Justin only to discover he's already partnered with Leah, a new arrival. To change his mind, Jenn urges Kat to land a triple toe jump, her most consistent triple jump before her injury. Though Kat fails to land the jump she nevertheless impresses Justin with her determination though he tells her she still needs to win over his father. A fight between Kat and her mother, Carol, leaves Kat homeless and isolated from Serena.
3	"Proceed with Caution"	Matt Hastings	Paul Keables	January 1, 2020
Kat struggles with partnering for the first time. Dasha urges her and Justin to bond with one another and her old school methods lead them to unexpectedly open up to one another. Meanwhile, Kat takes her suspicions that Serena's new coach, Mitch, is grooming her to the next level.
4	"Keep Pinecrest Wild"	Matt Hastings	Elizabeth Pearson	January 1, 2020
When Kat and Justin struggle to connect on the ice Kat worries that her bipolar disorder is causing her to withdraw from everyone. She seeks out Marcus for a date provoking Justin's jealousy. Meanwhile, Carol and Serena's coach Mitch grow closer.
5	"Two for $40"	Matt Hastings	Leon Chills	January 1, 2020
Kat's plans to show her mother she can make it on her own are thwarted when Carol cleans out her bank account. Upset that Carol and Mitch are growing closer, Serena reveals that Carol is bipolar hoping to drive him away.
6	"Have a Nice Day!"	Norma Bailey	Jenny Lynn	January 1, 2020
After a stint at a mental health facility Carol tries to put her life in order but suffers a series of financial setbacks. She turns to Justin's stepmother Mandy for help. Mitch feels conflicted in his relationship as Carol's boyfriend and Serena's coach. Things begin to go well for Kat as she begins to recover from her PTSD and she and Justin open up to one another off ice. However as things begin to go well Kat begins to struggle under the pressure to perform.
7	"Healing Times May Vary"	Norma Bailey	Elizabeth Higgins Clark	January 1, 2020
As Kat and Justin begin to compete Kat's disappointed that the low difficulty of their routine means they always finish well off the podium. Hoping to get a chance to compete nationally Kat makes a decision that prioritizes her career over her mental health. When Serena's father Reggie abruptly returns Mitch struggles with jealousy while Carol welcomes the news until she learns that Reggie plans to take Serena in full time.
8	"Hell Is Real"	Jon Amiel	Paul Keables & Elizabeth Peterson	January 1, 2020
After weeks of not taking her meds Kat becomes manic and goes on a buying and partying spree that has devastating consequences for Justin and Marcus. Serena feels abandoned as Kat dodges her calls and Carol gets caught up helping Mandy when she goes into early labour.
9	"#1 Mom"	Matt Hastings	Lara Olsen	January 1, 2020
After getting a call from Justin, Carol helps Kat to go back on her medication and lies to everyone that she has pneumonia. Now aware of Kat's secret, Justin and Marcus decide to keep quiet despite suffering harsh consequences for her behaviour. Despite Kat's desire to come clean about her disorder, Carol pressures Kat to stay silent about her mental illness.
10	"Kiss & Cry"	Jon Amiel	Samantha Stratton	January 1, 2020
Justin decides to end his personal and professional relationship with Kat only to change his mind at the last minute. The two head to Sectionals which is being held at the rink where Kat had her career altering injury. Kat is distracted from the competition when Serena's behaviour leads her to once again suspect that Serena has been sexually assaulted by Mitch.

== Production ==
=== Development ===
On October 11, 2018, it was announced that Netflix had given the production a series order consisting of ten episodes. The series was created by Samantha Stratton who was also expected to serve as co-showrunner with Lara Olsen. Stratton and Olsen were also set to executive produce the series alongside Joby Harold and Tory Tunnell with Matt Schwartz serving as a co-executive producer. Production companies were slated to consist of Safehouse Pictures. On February 3, 2020, it was reported that the series was canceled after one season.

=== Casting ===
Alongside the series order announcement, it was confirmed that Emma Roberts would star in the series. On October 31, 2018, it was reported that Roberts had dropped out of the series, citing a scheduling conflict. In December 2018, it was announced that Kaya Scodelario had been cast to replace Roberts in the role of Kat Baker. It was also reported that Willow Shields, Evan Roderick, Johnny Weir, Sarah Wright Olsen, Will Kemp, Kaitlyn Leeb, Amanda Zhou, and Mitchell Edwards had been cast in series regular roles. On January 16, 2019, it was reported that January Jones had joined the cast in a leading role. On February 21, 2019, it was announced that Svetlana Efremova and Charlie Hewson had been cast in a series regular role and recurring capacity respectively.

=== Figure skating doubles ===
A number of Canadian figure skaters served as skating doubles for the series' stars, including Michelle Long (singles skating) and Elizabeth Putnam (singles and pairs skating) for Kaya Scodelario as Kat Baker, Kim Deguise Léveillée (jumps) for Scodelario and Willow Shields as Serena Baker, and Dylan Moscovitch for Evan Roderick as Justin Davis. Canadian pair team Evelyn Walsh and Trennt Michaud served as doubles for Kat and Justin's pair elements. Other doubles include Lilika Zheng for Amanda Zhou as Jenn Yu, Emma Cullen for January Jones as Carol Baker, and Madeline Schizas for Kaitlyn Leeb as Leah Starnes.

=== Filming ===
Principal photography for the series took place from January 28 to May 16, 2019, in Toronto, Ontario.

== Reception ==
On review aggregation website Rotten Tomatoes, the series has an approval rating of 59% with an average rating of 6.5/10, based on 21 reviews. The website's critical consensus states, "Though at times more melodramatic than meaningful, Spinning Out's campy, guilty-pleasure exterior hides a surprisingly thoughtful exploration of living with a mental illness." On Metacritic, it has a weighted average score of 47 out of 100, based 4 critics, indicating "mixed or average reviews".

Robyn Bahr of The Hollywood Reporter called it "Uneven but mostly engrossing, it combines the unflinching class struggles of I, Tonya, the star-crossed romance of The Cutting Edge and the disability-as-tragedy goopiness of Ice Castles." Caroline Framke of Variety wrote "The series has all the right ingredients for an addictive watch: a solid premise, some compelling actors, and some classic teen show tensions and rhythms in the earnest vein of 'Degrassi' braiding it all together. But as the season plods towards its uneven finale, 'Spinning Out' instead does exactly what its title promises instead of sticking the landing."
