= Gabrielle (talk show) =

American television talk show

- Presented by: Gabrielle Carteris
- Country of origin: United States
- Original language: English
- No. of seasons: 1

Production
- Running time: 60 minutes
- Production company: 20th Television

Original release
- Network: Syndication
- Release: September 11, 1995 – June 19, 1996

Gabrielle is an American daytime talk show that was hosted by Gabrielle Carteris. The show ran in syndication for one season from September 11, 1995, to June 19, 1996.

Carteris was offered the gig by 20th Television after wanting a career change.

== Broadcast history and release ==
On January 2, 1996, 20th Television announced that the show was canceled.
