= Abbie Cobb =

American actress and author

- Occupations: Actress, author
- Years active: 2009–present

Abbie Cobb is an American actress and author. She is known for her recurring roles as Emily Bradford on 90210 and as Kimantha on Suburgatory.

== Life and career ==
Abbie Cobb attended middle school and high school in Papillion, Nebraska, while her father was stationed at Offutt Air Force Base.

In 2009, she received her first screen role as A.J. in the 2010 Disney Channel original film Starstruck. She also had small role in the 2009 film The Missing Person. Her other acting credits include The Mentalist, Jonas, Medium, CSI: Miami, Pair of Kings, Imagination Movers, Big Time Rush, American Horror Story and the Disney Channel original film Good Luck Charlie, It's Christmas! (2011).

From 2011 to 2013, she had a recurring role as Emily Bradford on The CW series 90210. She almost did not land the role, because of her close resemblance to fellow 90210 actress Jennie Garth. Her hair was dyed a dark color so she would be less like Garth.

In 2011, Cobb wrote her first book entitled Stuck on a Ferris Wheel, a guide book to assist up-and-coming actors. She shares insights from that book as a speaker at conferences and workshops for actors.

From 2012 to 2014, Cobb had a recurring role as Kimantha on the ABC sitcom Suburgatory.

After years of being told how much she looks like Jennie Garth, particularly during Garth's time on Beverly Hills, 90210, it was announced in July 2015 that Cobb was cast to play Garth in the Lifetime television film The Unauthorized Beverly Hills, 90210 Story. It premiered on October 3, 2015.

Cobb is the co-owner of The AFA Studio in Toluca Lake, California.

== Filmography ==
=== Film ===
Year	Title	Role	Notes
2009	The Missing Person	Leopard Girl	
2014	Moms' Night Out	Bridget	
2016	The Umbrella Man	Jackie	
2017	Weeji	Piper	Short
2017	The Candle	Ryder	Short
2020	How to Deter a Robber	Christine Schroeder	
2023	A Great Divide	Debbi Jackson	
2023	Old Dads	Judy	
2025	Cottonmouth	Rose Dunn	

=== Television ===
Year	Title	Role	Notes
2010	The Mentalist	Tess	Episode: "Rose-Colored Glasses"
2010	Starstruck	AJ	Disney Channel Original Movie
2010	Jonas	Jessika	Episode: "The Flirt Locker"
2010	Medium	Stacy McKee	Episode: "The People in Your Neighborhood"
2010	CSI: Miami	Donna Johnson	Episode: "Blood Sugar"
2011	Pair of Kings	Ethel	Episode: "The Young and the Restless"
2011	Imagination Movers	Goldilocks	Episode: "Goldilocks and the Four Movers"
2011	Big Time Rush	Jeanette	Episode: "Big Time Contest"
2011	American Horror Story	Dorothy Hudson	Episode: "Murder House"
2011	Good Luck Charlie, It's Christmas!	Jordan	Disney Channel Original Movie
2011–12	90210	Emily Bradford	7 episodes
2011–14	Suburgatory	Kimantha	15 episodes
2012	Two and a Half Men	Gabby	Episode: "Why We Gave Up Women"
2012	True Blood	Lindsey	Episode: "Whatever I Am, You Made Me"
2012	Longmire	Evelyn Mace	Episode: "An Incredibly Beautiful Thing"
2012	NCIS: Los Angeles	Astrid	Episode: "The Fifth Man"
2012	Teenage Bank Heist	Cassie Aveson	Movie
2012–13	The Secret Life of the American Teenager	Francine	4 episodes
2013	Bones	Paula Byrne	Episode: "The Blood from the Stones"
2013	Grey's Anatomy	Frances 'Frankie' Keller	Episode: "Sleeping Monster"
2014	Warriors	Sienna Pruitt	Movie
2014	Intelligence	Mackenzie Bradshaw	Episode: "The Rescue"
2014	Criminal Minds	Claire Dunbar	Episode: "If the Shoe Fits"
2015	Cheerleader Death Squad	Maddie	Movie
2015	Young & Hungry	Danielle	Episode: "Young & Ferris Wheel"
2015	The Unauthorized Beverly Hills, 90210 Story	Jennie Garth	Movie
2015	NCIS: New Orleans	Alison Hewitt	Episode: "I Do"
2016	Boy in the Attic	Callie Davis	Movie
2016	The Night Shift	Dani Stafford	Episode: "Burned"
2017	Girlfriends' Guide to Divorce	Quinna	Episode: "When One Door Opens, There's an Icy Draft"
2018	Santa Clarita Diet	Kayla Lawson	Episode: "Moral Gray Area"
2018	Henry Danger	Cassie	Episode: "Budget Cuts"
2018	Shameless	Colette	Episode: "Face It, You're Gorgeous"
2018	NCIS	Melanie Keller/Ritz	Episode: "A Thousand Words"
2019–21	Dwight in Shining Armor	Ragana	6 episodes
2021	Them	Natt Dixon	Recurring cast
2023	911	Josephine 'Jo'	Episode: "Pay it forward"
2023	Miss Governor	Estelle	Episodes: "Every Woman" and "Thoughts & Prayers"
2025	The Lowdown	Vicky Williams	Recurring cast
