= How to Deter a Robber =

- Directed by: Maria Bissell
- Written by: Maria Bissell
- Starring: Vanessa Marano; Benjamin Papac; Abbie Cobb; Sonny Valicenti; Gabrielle Carteris; Chris Mulkey
- Cinematography: Stephen Tringali
- Release date: September 29, 2020 (Fantastic Fest)
- Country: United States
- Language: English

How to Deter a Robber is a 2020 American crime comedy film written and directed by Maria Bissell and starring Vanessa Marano, Benjamin Papac, Abbie Cobb, Sonny Valicenti, Gabrielle Carteris and Chris Mulkey. It is Bissell's feature directorial debut.

== Premise ==
A teenage girl, her boyfriend and her uncle, face off against a pair of burglars.

== Plot ==
While spending Christmas at a lakeside holiday cabin, Madison (Vanessa Marano) bickers with her mother (Gabrielle Carteris). Bored and annoyed, she and her dopey boyfriend Jimmy (Benjamin Papac) spot a light switched on in their neighbours' presumably empty house. They enter it and finding a Ouija board inside, they use it before falling asleep in a drunken and stoned state in one of the bedrooms.

Next morning on waking up, they discover that the place has been ransacked. They telephone the local police who on arrival, do not initially believe the teenager's story but have doubts about their culpability on realising that they were the ones who had dialled 911 in the first place. Thus Madison and Jimmy - as minors - are compelled by the law to stay in the immediate local area pending the conclusion of the police investigation which requires that they are placed in the custody of Madison's uncle Andy (Chris Mulkey).

When Andy's house is also broken into and burglarized, the trio retreat to the family's primary enclave, and fearful of the burglars, Madison and Jimmy set up "Home Alone"-style booby-traps.

The burglars - Patrick (Sonny Valicenti) and Christine (Abbie Cobb) - eventually show up. A hostage situation then materializes causing Madison to fight in partnership with Jimmy.

== Cast ==
- Vanessa Marano as Madison Williams
- Benjamin Papac as Jimmy Culpepper
- Jonah Ray as Officer Russell
- Gabrielle Carteris as Charlotte Williams
- Chris Mulkey as Andy Reynolds
- Abbie Cobb as Christine Schroeder
- Sonny Valicenti as Patrick Lindner
- Leah Lewis as Heather Williams
- Arnold Y. Kim as Scott Williams
- Nikki Crawford as Officer Martin
- Deanna Rooney as Darla Peterson

== Production ==
The film was shot in 17 days.

== Release ==
The film premiered at the Fantastic Fest on September 29, 2020.

== Reception ==
The film has a 73% rating on Rotten Tomatoes. Marisa Maribal of Slash Film gave the film a 7.5 out 10.

Mel Valentin of Screen Anarchy gave the film a positive review and wrote, "How to Deter a Robber will and should be remembered as the work of a talented, first-time filmmaker."
