= Gabrielle Carteris =

American actress

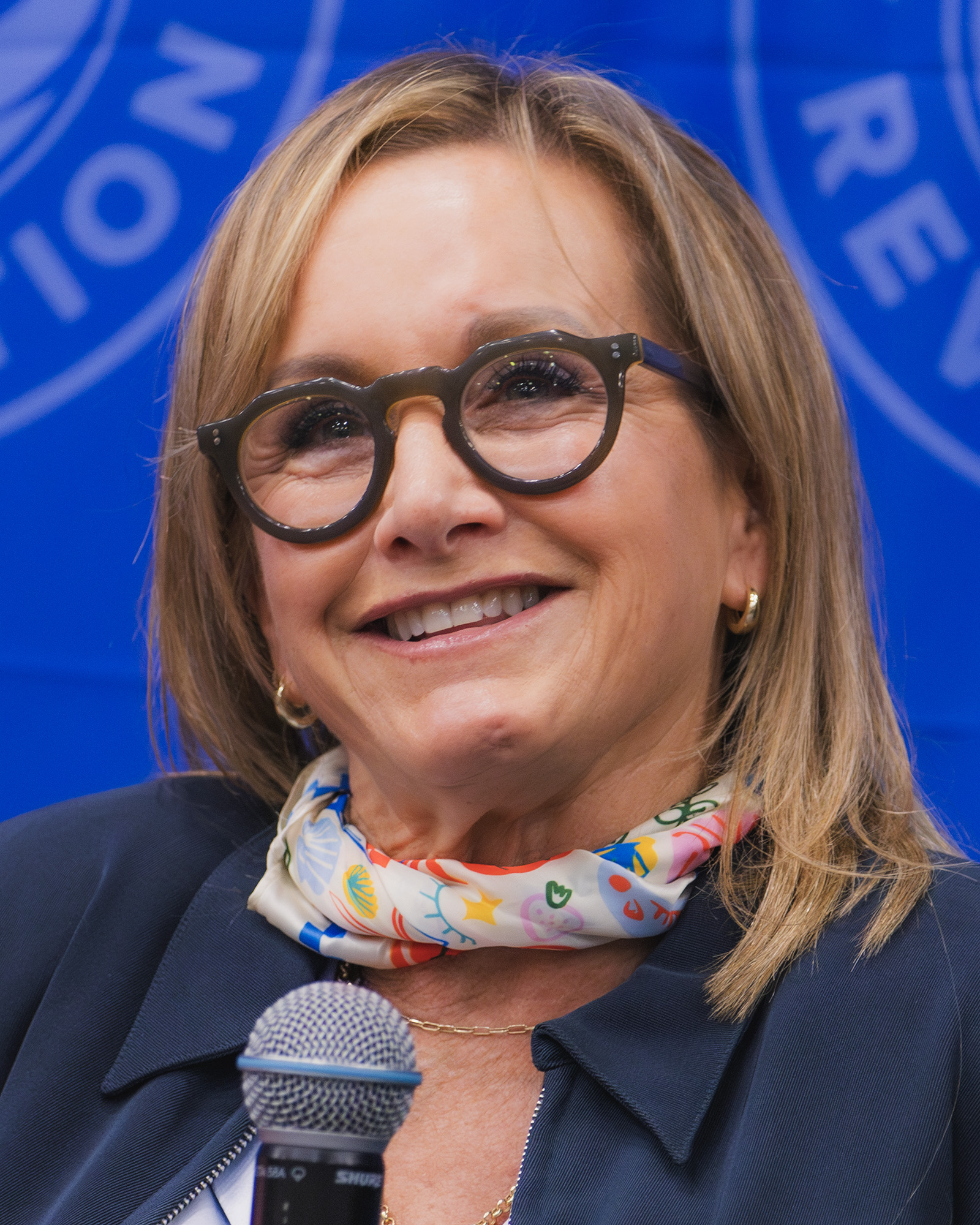
- Carteris in 2026

2nd National President of SAG-AFTRA
- In office April 9, 2016 – October 15, 2021
- Preceded by: Ken Howard
- Succeeded by: Fran Drescher

Personal details
- Born: Scottsdale, Arizona, U.S.
- Spouse: Charles Isaacs (m. 1992)
- Children: 2
- Occupation: Actress; trade unionist

Gabrielle Carteris (/kɑːrˈtɛrɪs/ kar-TERR-iss) is an American actress and trade union leader. She is best known for her role as Andrea Zuckerman in Beverly Hills, 90210.

In 2012, Carteris was elected as executive vice president of SAG-AFTRA (the Screen Actors Guild–American Federation of Television and Radio Artists), a trade union representing 170,000 media professionals worldwide. She assumed the position of acting president following the death of the previous president, Ken Howard, on March 23, 2016. On April 9, 2016, Carteris was elected SAG-AFTRA president by the national board to serve out the remainder of Howard's term. She was re-elected to the position in August 2017 and August 2019 by full membership vote.

== Early years ==
Carteris was born in Scottsdale, Arizona, to Marlene, a realtor, and Ernest J. Carteris, a restaurant owner. She has a twin brother, James. Her father was of Greek ancestry whereas her mother is Jewish. Her parents separated six months after her birth. Carteris's mother moved with her children to San Francisco, California, where she set up a children's clothing store. She attended Redwood High School in Larkspur, California.

== Career ==
After graduating from Sarah Lawrence College, Carteris's early television career found her typically cast as a teenager in such fare as ABC Afterschool Specials, CBS Schoolbreak Special, and the long-running soap opera Another World. This trend of playing significantly younger characters would continue, when in 1990, she was cast in her best-known role as studious school newspaper editor Andrea Zuckerman on Beverly Hills, 90210. At age 29, she was the oldest cast member to portray a 15-year-old, lying about her age to get the part. By 1993, while working for the show, her GABCO Productions company signed a deal with Rysher TPE.

In 1995, Carteris left the series and became the host of her own television talk show, Gabrielle, which lasted only one season. Following this, she worked regularly as an actor and voiceover artist, amassing a considerable amount of post-90210 credits in television, film, and video games. She became a mainstay in television films, starring in nearly a dozen of them. Her first, Seduced and Betrayed, was released in 1995. She became a regular presence on network television, appearing in episodes of series such as Touched by an Angel, King of the Hill, NYPD Blue, JAG, Criminal Minds, and NCIS, among others. She has appeared in several feature films. Carteris also provided the voice for the Motorola intelligent assistant "Mya."

In 2019, Carteris appeared on Fox's BH90210 reboot, appearing both as Andrea Zuckerman and herself. The fictionalized version of herself was portrayed as sexually questioning and engaged in a brief relationship with former 90210 guest-star turned fictional Fox executive Christine Elise. It was a six-episode series in which the cast played heightened, fictionalized versions of themselves. The series aired on FOX in August and September 2019 and was canceled after one season.

== SAG-AFTRA ==
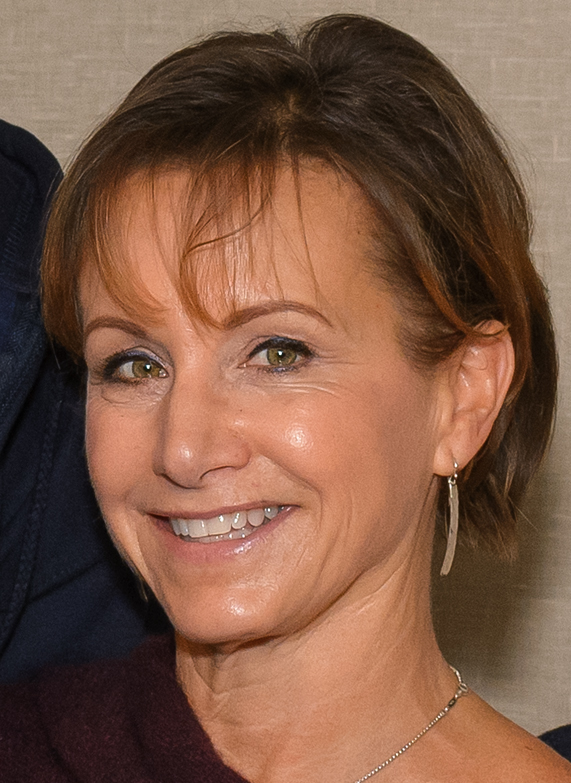
Carteris in 2017

Carteris became the executive vice president of SAG-AFTRA, following the Screen Actors' Guild (SAG) and American Federation of Television and Radio Artists (AFTRA) merger in 2012. She became acting president of the union following the death of previous president Ken Howard on March 23, 2016, and was elected president on April 9, 2016, by the national board to complete the remainder of Howard's two-year term. She served three two-year terms as president, defeating challengers such as Esai Morales in 2017 and Matthew Modine in 2019 in direct votes by union members. She also serves as vice president of the California Labor Federation. In August 2020, she announced that there would be sharp cuts, including a raise in the earnings floor to qualify for next year's SAG-AFTRA Health Plan due to two consecutive years of deficits and projected losses in years to come. Carteris did not seek re-election in 2021, backing Fran Drescher as her successor instead.

== Personal life ==
While filming the pilot of Beverly Hills, 90210, Carteris began dating Charles Isaacs, a stockbroker. In 1991, Isaacs moved to Los Angeles to be with her. After two years together, they married on May 3, 1992, at Santa Barbara's Four Seasons resort. Carteris and Isaacs have two daughters.

== Filmography ==
=== Film ===
Year	Title	Role	Notes
1989	Jacknife	College Girl in Bar	
1992	Raising Cain	Nan	
1997	Meet Wally Sparks	Herself	
2001	Full Circle	Alice	
2001	Malpractice	Ellen Robertson	
2005	The Toy Warrior		Voice
2007	Plot 7	Amy McCarthy	
2008	Dimples	Sharon	
2009	Print	Kathy	
2020	How to Deter a Robber	Charlotte	

=== Television ===
Year	Title	Role	Notes
1987	CBS Schoolbreak Special	Nancy	Episode: "What If I'm Gay?"
1987	ABC Afterschool Special	Leslie	Episode: "Seasonal Differences"
1988	ABC Afterschool Special	Cecile	Episode: "Date Rape"
1988	Another World	Tracy Julian	
1990–1996, 1998 & 2000	Beverly Hills, 90210	Andrea Zuckerman	Main role (seasons 1–5); Guest role (seasons 6, 8 & 10)
1994	Gargoyles	Amy Schummer	Voice, episode: "And Justice for All"
1995	Seduced and Betrayed	Cheryl Hiller	Television film
1995	Mixed Blessings	Diana Goode Douglas	Television film
1996	To Face Her Past	Megan Hollander	Television film
1996	Touched by an Angel	April Campbell	Episode: "The Portrait of Mrs. Campbell"
1997	Johnny Bravo	Various	Voice, 2 episodes
1997	Pinky and the Brain	Asian Boy	Voice, episode: "Bah, Wilderness"
1998	Touched by an Angel	Linda Craig	Episode: "The Trigger"
1998	The Love Boat: The Next Wave	Brenda	Episode: "All Aboard"
1998	Men in Black: The Series	Agent E	Voice, episode: “The Star System Syndrome”
1999	King of the Hill	Julie, Rita Bevacqua	Voice, episode: "Take Me Out of the Ball Game"
1999	The Big Guy and Rusty the Boy Robot	Dr. Erika Slate	
2000	Batman Beyond	Sable Thorpe	Voice, episode: "King's Ransom"
2001	Strong Medicine	Freddie Gosling	Episode: "Mortality"
2001	JAG	Michelle Stoechler	Episode: "Mixed Messages"
2002	Trapped: Buried Alive	Emily Cooper	Television film
2002	NYPD Blue	Miss Griffin	Episode: "Low Blow"
2002	For the People	Tracy Smith	Episode: "Textbook Perfect"
2002	The Zeta Project	Female Tour Guide	Voice, episode: "The Wrong Morph"
2003	The Agency	Mrs. Akil	Episode: "An Isolated Incident"
2003	The Mummy	Jane Sherman	Voice, episode: "Old Friends"
2003	Nip/Tuck	Ellie Collins	Episode: "Kurt Dempsey"
2003	Clifford the Big Red Dog	Kiki	Voice, episode: "Big Hearted T-Bone"
2004	Combustion	Lourie Harper	Television film
2005	A Lover's Revenge	Det. Sparks	Television film
2005	Deck the Halls	Holly Hall	Television film
2005	Palmetto Pointe	Mrs. Jones	Episode: "Hello, Goodbye"
2005	Crossing Jordan	Dawn McGuire	Episode: "Enlightment"
2006	Drake & Josh	Dr. Phyllis Tupper	Episode: "Dr. Phyllis Show"
2006	Avatar: The Last Airbender	Poppy Beifong	Voice, episode: "The Blind Bandit"
2006	The Wives He Forgot	Actress on TV (uncredited)	Television film
2008	Dan's Detour of Life	Cindy Ford	Television film
2008	My Alibi	Principal Tuckerman	Main role
2010	Criminal Minds	Nancy Campbell	Episode: "Solitary Man"
2011	The Event	Diane Geller	2 episodes
2011	Make It or Break It	Doctor	Episode: "Requiem for a Dream"
2011	Batman: The Brave and the Bold	Vicki Vale/Laethwen	Voice, 2 episodes
2011	12 Wishes of Christmas	Sandra	Television film
2013	The Middle	Colleen	Episode: "The Friend"
2013	Longmire	Barbara Bollman	Episode: "Party's Over"
2015	Code Black	Nurse Amy Wolfowitz	Recurring role
2016	The Suicide Note	Professor Majors	Television film
2018	NCIS	Julie Bell	Episode: "Family Ties"
2019	BH90210	Herself/Andrea Zuckerman	Also co-producer
2022	We Own This City	Andrea Smith, head of OCDETF	Guest role
2022	9-1-1	Blimp Co-Pilot	Guest role

=== Video games ===
Year	Title	Role	Notes
2002	La Pucelle: Tactics	Angelique	
2002	Forgotten Realms: Icewind Dale II		
2002	Minority Report: Everybody Runs	Agatha Lively	
2003	Arc the Lad: Twilight of the Spirits	Nafia	
2004	Shout About Movies	Voice-over	
2006	Marvel: Ultimate Alliance	Elektra Natchios, Enchantress	
2007	Spider-Man 3	Additional Voices	
2009	Bionic Commando	Jayne Magdalene	
