= Andrea Zuckerman =

Fictional character from Beverley Hills, 90210

- Beverly Hills, 90210 franchise character
- Portrayed by: Gabrielle Carteris
- Duration: 1990–1994; 2019–
- First appearance: Beverly Hills, 90210: October 4, 1990 (episode 1.01: "Class of Beverly Hills")
- Last appearance: As Star: May 17, 1995 (Beverly Hills, 90210, "Hello Life, Goodbye Beverly Hills"); As Special Guest: May 17, 2000 (Beverly Hills, 90210, "Ode to Joy")
- Created by: Darren Star
In-universe information
- Parents: Kenny Zuckerman (father); Gail Zuckerman (mother)
- Children: Hannah Vasquez (daughter)
- Grandparents: Rose Zuckerman (grandmother)

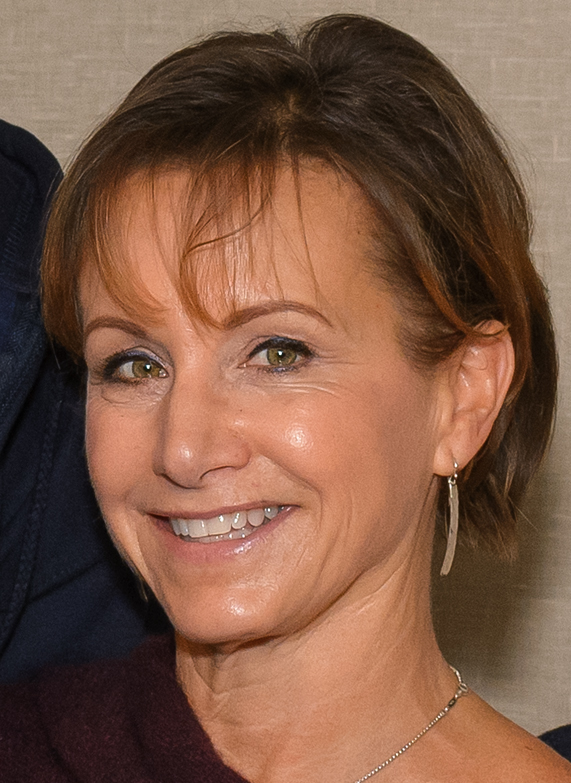
Gabrielle Carteris in 2017

Andrea Zuckerman, portrayed by Gabrielle Carteris, is a fictional character who was one of the female leads of Beverly Hills, 90210 for the first five seasons.

Andrea was the intelligent but sometimes socially awkward editor of the school newspaper the West Beverly Blaze. She was politically and socially conscious, and often dealt with storylines concerning gender, class, race, and politics. Early in the series Andrea was befriended by Brandon Walsh, who served as her entry point into the "Gang". Though initially an outsider to the female trio of Brenda, Donna, and Kelly, Andrea gradually became good friends with all three.

== Conception ==
Gabrielle Carteris lied about her age in order to get the role.

== Beverly Hills, 90210 ==
=== Season 1-3 ===
Andrea was introduced early in season one as living with her parents in Van Nuys and secretly commuting from there (against school rules) to West Beverly High, using her grandmother's (Lainie Kazan) small apartment in Beverly Hills as her mailing address. Her parents were only shown once during the show's run. Also, in season one Andrea states that she has a sister, but this sister is never seen and never mentioned again.

During the summer of 1991, while attending summer school with Brenda and Donna, Andrea and Brenda briefly became competitive when they both developed crushes on their drama teacher, the teacher decided to make inappropriate advances toward Andrea, which she encouraged and engaged in, until she found out the teacher had another girlfriend. The following summer, she worked as a day-camp counselor at the Beverly Hills Beach Club and became especially interested in helping a young deaf boy named Cameron. She was injured in a hit-and-run while walking home from West Beverly during the fall of her senior year. Though all she could remember was the color and size of the car, she remained positive and upbeat during the aftermath.

Andrea's senior year improved when she received an acceptance to Yale University and developed a crush on Gil Meyer, a young AP English teacher and journalism advisor. But she accused him of sexism when he picks Brandon to be The Blaze's editor-in-chief. Later Andrea and Brandon became the paper's co-editors and made peace, and Andrea sees Gil with his girlfriend. Gil is last seen during Andrea's farewell party at the end of the fifth season.

=== Relationship with Brandon Walsh ===
Andrea and Brandon were teased as a possible couple throughout seasons 1-3. Early on it was established that Andrea had feelings for Brandon, but that he initially looked upon her more as a friend. They first shared a brief kiss in the season 1 episode "B.Y.O.B", with a drunk Brandon initiating the kiss, and Andrea rejecting him for his inappropriate behavior. What could be considered the height of the romantic side of their relationship occurred in the season one finale "Home Again", which featured the infamous scene of Andrea offering her virginity to the supposedly leaving Brandon while they rode a carousel. Throughout the episode Brandon and Andrea share several make-out sessions in anticipation of their "big night", and Brandon is shown finally expressing his attraction to her, telling his sister that he thinks she is pretty, and fantasizing about a "sexy Andrea" in a tight red dress, no glasses, and a serving apron. The episode concludes with Andrea deciding not to go through with a sexual encounter, persuaded instead by Kelly Taylor (who later herself enters a serious relationship with Brandon) to turn the promise of their sexual rendezvous into a way to get Brandon to a surprise goodbye party at the Peach Pit. Despite Brandon's insistence that he would still like to go through with their plans, Andrea decides it's best they stay friends. Brandon, whose parents decide not to move away after all, again brings up the possibility of them starting a relationship an episode later, at which time Andrea again shoots down the idea in favor of preserving their friendship.

Season 2 brought another impaired kiss on the part of Brandon, this time while he was high on the drug "U4EA" (ecstasy) given to him by his then girlfriend Emily Valentine, and more pining by Andrea for Brandon, including serious jealousy on her part over him and Emily. Kelly Taylor encourages Andrea to take the initiative to go after what she wants, but Andrea simply is unable, or unwilling, to make the necessary moves.

Season 3 marks the turning point, and reconciliation of the romantic aspects of their friendship. Andrea and Brandon again work their summer at the Beverly Hills Country Club, with Brandon expressing apprehension with working with Andrea, afraid her feelings for him might hamper his ability to date over the summer. Unbeknownst to Brandon, and the rest of the gang, Andrea begins dating handsome former editor of The Blaze, and West Beverly alum Jay (played by Peter Krause), an unexpected match considering he is a staunch Republican and she a fierce liberal. This sparks intense jealousy in Brandon, who can't bear the sight of them kissing and going out, which inspires Steve to suggest he make his move before it's too late. One day after her shift, while on the way to meet up with Jay, Brandon asks her not to go, and leans in for a kiss. Furious, Andrea rejects him, asks him "What makes you think you're so damn irresistible?", and accuses him of only wanting her because she's finally taken. They end up mending fences by show's close, with Andrea teasing Brandon over his poor timing, and Brandon lamenting "you don't know what you've got until it's gone".

From that point on much of the romantic tension between the characters subsides, with Brandon dating a fellow student named Nikki, and Andrea continuing to date Jay in an offscreen, long distance relationship. Both happened to get dumped on the same day, and while watching "It's a Wonderful Life" together, they begin to passionately kiss. Andrea stops the kiss, accusing him of thinking of Nikki, he in turn accuses her of thinking of Jay, and things spiral quickly into a heated argument. They, once again, reconcile by the end of the show.

The last romantic tease between the characters happens at the Senior Prom. Andrea's then boyfriend, and Brandon's friend from another high school, Jordon Bonner, supposedly gets sick right before he was due to take Andrea to the prom. Brandon, who had no plans to attend, is encouraged by friend Steve Sanders to ask Andrea. They go to prom together, with him breaking his "no dancing" rule for her, telling her that there was no one else in the world he'd rather be there with than her, and generally having a wonderful time. Through events started by Brenda's date, who presumptuously booked a hotel for them to spend the night in, and her subsequent rejection, Brandon and Andrea end up with the key to a suite. Andrea and Brandon find themselves on the bed, contemplating sleeping together. The episode ends without us knowing the outcome, which is revealed the following week. We learn that Brandon decided that their friendship was far too important to ruin with one night of sex, which, after getting over hurt feelings, Andrea agrees is for the best. This marks the ending of a three season long romantic push-pull between Brandon and Andrea. While they would continue to have a very close friendship, even sharing a few more completely platonic kisses, all of the romantic tension between the pair is resolved by the close of season 3, with neither shown to be pining after the other again.

=== Season 4 ===
Andrea turns down Yale to attend California University with the gang. She forged a bond with Donna Martin when they shared with one another their decision to wait to have sex. Andrea eventually breaks this pact while in college at California University when she has sex with her RA, Dan Rubin, which becomes a part of the issue leading to a minor hormonal tiff between the two friends. Andrea and Brenda found themselves on opposite sides once again in 1994 when Brenda joined a group which tried to free the animals from a CU testing lab facility. Andrea worked at the facility and felt betrayed that Brenda would do such a thing since the lab actually didn't do anything to harm animals in the first place and instead conducted studies to be used in an effort to make medical advancements for people. This season, more so than any other, shows Andrea growing closer to the girls in the 90210 gang, with the famous Kelly/Brenda/Donna trio widening a bit to include Andrea, who was previously mainly close friends with just Brandon and Brenda. She forges her own strong bonds with both Donna and Kelly, which last the show's run.

Soon after starting her relationship with Dan Rubin, Andrea met Jesse Vasquez at Jim and Cindy Walsh's 20th anniversary party, at which Jesse was working as a bartender to help pay for college while he attended CU for a law degree. The two clicked instantly. Soon after, while still technically with Dan, Andrea began a relationship with Jesse. She soon officially broke off the already cooling relationship with Dan. Incensed because he was in love with her, Dan directed inappropriate racial comments toward Jesse. Dan eventually moved out of the dorm, and Jesse and Andrea continued to date.

This led to the most controversial, and unexpected, storyline development in the character's history. Andrea Zuckerman, having slept with Jesse only once without protection, soon found that she was pregnant. This development was designed to coincide with Gabrielle Carteris's real-life pregnancy, and allowed the issue of teen pregnancy to be explored fully by using one of the series' regulars, not to mention the most unlikely member of the group. After considering an abortion, Andrea eventually decided to keep the baby, which forms the previously mentioned close connection with Kelly Taylor, who helped Andrea through the decision. Andrea married Jesse in a civil ceremony (and in one of the few times that her family is shown), and she later gave premature birth to their daughter, Hannah Vasquez.

=== Season 5 ===
After Hannah spent months in the hospital, Andrea and Jesse were finally able to bring her home. Andrea's early season 5 storylines were mostly limited to minor daycare issues, and the struggles she faced as a young mother trying to juggle a new marriage, child, and keeping up her excellent grades. The early marriage and child story, while a high point for the character a season before, began to alienate Andrea from the gang, and she began to fade into the background.

Attempts were made during the second half of the season to inject some life into Andrea's waning story. She was thrust back into the political arena, again sharing screentime with Brandon, a move designed to keep her more involved in campus life and remind audiences of her once-strong political passions. Her marriage was thrown into trouble when she and Jesse had difficulty getting past their religious differences as she was Jewish and he was Catholic. Later a complete physical makeover of the character was allowed; though she'd already shed the glasses a year before, Andrea's hair was suddenly blonde, and she was allowed to wear more body-conscious fashion, perhaps in an attempt to visually mesh her with the rest of the women on the canvas. All aspects of the once socially-awkward borderline "nerd" were now wiped clean.

Andrea was given another unexpected story when she cheated on her husband with medical intern Peter, who tried to pick her up at the laundromat when he assumed she was little Hannah's babysitter, not her mother. She threw away the phone number he gave her, but several episodes later, after running into him at the laundromat again at a time that her marriage was in serious trouble, she finally decided to call him. They began a torrid affair, sneaking around at work to be together and going as far as booking a motel room for sex. Finally, Andrea was with Jesse when they ran into Peter and his wife Adrian; they ended up having dinner together, during which Andrea and Peter share a fantasy that paints them as silver-screen dance legends Ginger Rogers and Fred Astaire. Andrea finally decided that she was in love with Peter; she informed him that she was leaving Jesse for him and expected him to leave Adrian. Peter was taken aback and told her that he had no plans to leave his wife and that he was happy with their "arrangement." Livid and devastated, Andrea ended the affair and was comforted by her friend Dylan McKay, who by chance had discovered and confronted her about the affair weeks earlier. Eventually both Andrea and Jesse confess to affairs: he had been with a fellow law clerk while away on business. That seemed to be the end of their year-long marriage, but despite deeply-hurt feelings and a mounting custody battle, both decided that their family is worth them trying to find their way back to each other.

Andrea also fulfilled a life-long goal when she was able to appear on Jeopardy! in the show's 5th season. It is suggested by the end of the episode that Andrea won.

At the end of the season, Jesse received a clerkship at Yale Law School and Andrea decided to transfer to Yale as well to enter their pre-med program, a plot decision necessitated by Carteris' decision to leave the show. This represents a full-circle character arc, as Andrea had been shown pining after Yale ever since high school, and after she was actually admitted but declined because of the high tuition and an ailing grandmother. After a tearful goodbye with her friends, she is shown finally driving off to her dreams, family in tow, as she remembers brighter days from high school.

=== Return to Beverly Hills ===
Andrea made several cameo appearances in 1996, 1998, and in the series finale in 2000. During her first visit back, in the season 6 finale "You Say It's Your Birthday", Andrea returns as a surprise guest at Steve's opulent 21st birthday bash. She sports a new short haircut, and much-improved fashion sense, but outside of being shown interacting with the group, has a little story of her own besides informing everyone that her life is great, and doling out advice to Kelly, whose life had taken a turn for the worse.

On the other hand, Andrea is a central figure on the season 8 episode "Reunion", which marks the gang's fifth-year high school reunion. She comes back to Beverly Hills for the reunion, everyone assuming that this "Super Woman", voted most likely to succeed in high school, managed to have it all: career, baby, and happy marriage. When we first see Andrea again she is on the phone with Jesse, having an argument about their life in CT, yelling that she didn't "want to be changing diapers for the rest of her life". She quickly wipes away her obvious tears and begins to pretend that her life indeed is perfect; all is well. When informed by Brandon and Kelly that she's expected to give a major speech at the reunion, the original speaker having fallen through, Andrea has a major emotional breakdown and spills the truth to her close friends; her life is a mess, she's dropped out of school, she's terribly unhappy, and she and Jesse are finally divorcing. After much back and forth with Brandon, who is deeply disappointed in her decisions, Andrea makes it clear that despite Brandon's judgmental remarks, she has tried everything to save her marriage, and that she does not appreciate her best friend judging her instead of standing in her corner, especially when he "has his whole life ahead of him". Seeing that she can't bear to stand up in front of the school and destroy everyone's image of her, Brandon makes the speech instead, prompting everyone at the Reunion to stop lying about where they are, and just be proud of what they've all accomplished up to that point, even if they've not yet "ruled the world" the way they always expected. We last see Andrea walking off to dance with a fellow student, who himself admits he's recently divorced.

Andrea's final appearance is her briefest return, where she shows up for the series finale "Ode to Joy". She's part of Donna Martin's bachelorette party, regales the attendees with the earlier story of how they all became friends in "Slumber Party" back in season 1, and is the one to pop in the taped appearance by Brandon, us getting a brief "final shot" of Andrea and Brandon. She reveals to Donna after the wedding, of which she was merely a member and not a bridesmaid, that Hannah is doing well, but provides no update on the developments between her and Jesse. Since she appears to not be wearing a wedding ring, and Donna does not ask about him, it is assumed that she and Jesse did indeed divorce as she said they would 2 seasons earlier. The final shot of Andrea is her, along with the entire gang sans Brenda and Brandon, and including Valerie Malone, dancing to "Celebrate" as the show fades to black.

== Missing years ==
After her departure in 1995, Andrea and Jesse attended Yale while raising Hannah. By 1998, it was revealed Andrea had experienced several problems: she had dropped out of school and filed for divorce from Jesse. Sometime after her divorce was finalized in 2000, she and Hannah had moved back to Beverly Hills, where Hannah would follow in her mother's footsteps and become a student at West Beverly.

== 90210 ==
Andrea and Jesse's daughter, Hannah Vasquez, is a student at West Beverly Hills High and is a news anchor for the school's TV news program. She only appeared in the pilot episode, "We're Not in Kansas Anymore". Ryan Matthews, upon seeing Hannah on the TV news program, turns to the class and makes a remark about the fact that she looks a lot older than a high school student. This is obviously in reference to the fact that Gabrielle Carteris was the oldest out of the main cast (being 29 at the time of the first season) while playing a high school student.

== Departure from Beverly Hills, 90210 ==
Gabrielle Carteris left the show following the fifth season. Andrea's pregnancy plotline was written at Carteris' request, so as to incorporate her real life pregnancy. After her original five-year contract ended, Carteris voluntarily left 90210 for her own self-titled talk show, which lasted only one season. Carteris returned to 90210 for guest appearances during the sixth, eighth, and tenth seasons.

After Andrea's departure, the show tried twice to recreate a similar character, with two new journalism-focused classmates of Brandon's: Susan Keats and Tracy Gaylian. Susan worked as editor of the college newspaper who admitted to having had an abortion years earlier to focus on her career (which echos Andrea's similar dilemma). Tracy was a news anchor for the CU TV station who like Andrea was career driven and politically conscious. Unlike Andrea, both Susan and Tracy had full-fledged romantic relationships with Brandon. Neither character became a regular cast member. Andrea and Jesse's interracial couple/unexpected pregnancy/quick marriage/premature birth story was also later repeated in the life of Janet Sosna (herself an Andrea "type") and Andrea's close friend Steve Sanders.

== Reception ==
The character had a mostly positive reception from critics. When Gabrielle Carteris became pregnant in real life, her character became pregnant in the show also, which caused controversy.
