= Evan Roderick =

Canadian actor (born 1995)

- Born: Evan Roderick Anderson; 29 June 1995 (age 31); North Vancouver, British Columbia, Canada
- Education: University of Massachusetts Lowell
- Occupation: Actor
- Years active: 2015–present
- Spouse: Dion Karas (m. 2026)

Evan Roderick Anderson (born 29 June 1995) is a Canadian actor and former ice hockey player.

== Life and career ==
Roderick was born and raised in North Vancouver, British Columbia. He has an older brother, Stuart. Evan first became interested in performing arts when he saw a Rolling Stones concert at the age of 10, and he decided to pursue it as a teenager.

Roderick attended Okanagan Hockey Academy in Penticton. He began ice hockey in the Pacific Coast Bantam Hockey League, BC Hockey Major Midget League, and Canadian Sport School Hockey League. He went on to play in the British Columbia Hockey League: one season with the Westside Warriors, one with the Alberni Valley Bulldogs, and three with the Langley Rivermen. He also played a season each in the Kootenay International Junior Hockey League with the Penticton Lakers and in the Pacific Junior Hockey League with the North Delta Devils. He acquired a division 1 scholarship to play for the University of Massachusetts Lowell River Hawks in the NCAA. He quit the sport at 19 after a series of injuries.

Roderick began working in commercials and short films from 2015. He made his television debut with a guest role in a 2015 episode of the docudrama series Untold Stories of the E.R., followed by Project Mc2 and When We Rise in 2017, Garage Sale Mystery in 2018, and BH90210 in 2019. He landed his first major role as Officer Nick Anastas in the DC Comics series Arrow, a recurring role he played for the last three seasons of the show from 2017 to 2019. In December 2018, it was announced Roderick would star as Justin Davis opposite Kaya Scodelario in the 2020 Netflix series Spinning Out.

== Personal life ==
In August 2022, Roderick began dating actress Dion Karas. They became engaged in October 2024 and married on August 22, 2026 in Loutraki, Greece.

== Filmography ==
=== Filmmaking credits ===
- Young/Old/Man (2017) - produced

=== Film ===
Year	Title	Role	Notes
2015	Alien Shy	Prince Charming	Short film
2016	The Clam Man	Andy	Short film
2017	Young/Old/Man	Sam	Short film
2017	Tributum	Viktor	Short film
	Iron to Rust	Tucker Jake	Upcoming

=== Television ===
Year	Title	Role	Notes
2015	Untold Stories of the E.R.	Mason	Episode: "Oh, Deer!"
2017	Project Mc2	Prince Wendell	Episode: "A Royal Pain"
2017	When We Rise	Kurt	Miniseries; Parts II and III
2017–2019	Arrow	Officer Nick Anastas	Recurring role (seasons 6–8); 12 episodes
2018	Garage Sale Mystery	Travis	Episode: "Picture a Murder"
2019	BH90210	Chaz Bryant	2 episodes
2020	Spinning Out	Justin Davis	Main role
2021	Hidden Jewel	John	TV movie; Main role
2022	Autumn in the City	Austin Edwards	TV movie; Main role
2022	A Tale of Two Christmases	Max	TV movie; Main role
2023	Aurora Teagarden Mysteries: Something New	Arthur	TV movie
2023	Sealed with a List	Wyatt Redmond	TV movie
2024	Aurora Teagarden Mysteries: A Lesson in Murder	Arthur	TV movie
2024	Aurora Teagarden Mysteries: Death at the Diner	Arthur	TV movie
2024	Leah's Perfect Gift	Graham	TV movie
2025	Providence Falls	Finn Walsh	TV Mini Series
2026	Because of Cupid	Marcus	TV movie
