= Figure skating at the 2022 Winter Olympics – Women's singles =

Women's singles skating at the XXIV Olympic Winter Games
- Venue: Capital Indoor Stadium; Beijing, China
- Dates: 15 and 17 February 2022
- Competitors: 30 from 18 nations
- Winning score: 255.95 points

Medalists
1st place, gold medalist(s)		Anna Shcherbakova	ROC
2nd place, silver medalist(s)		Alexandra Trusova	ROC
3rd place, bronze medalist(s)		Kaori Sakamoto	Japan

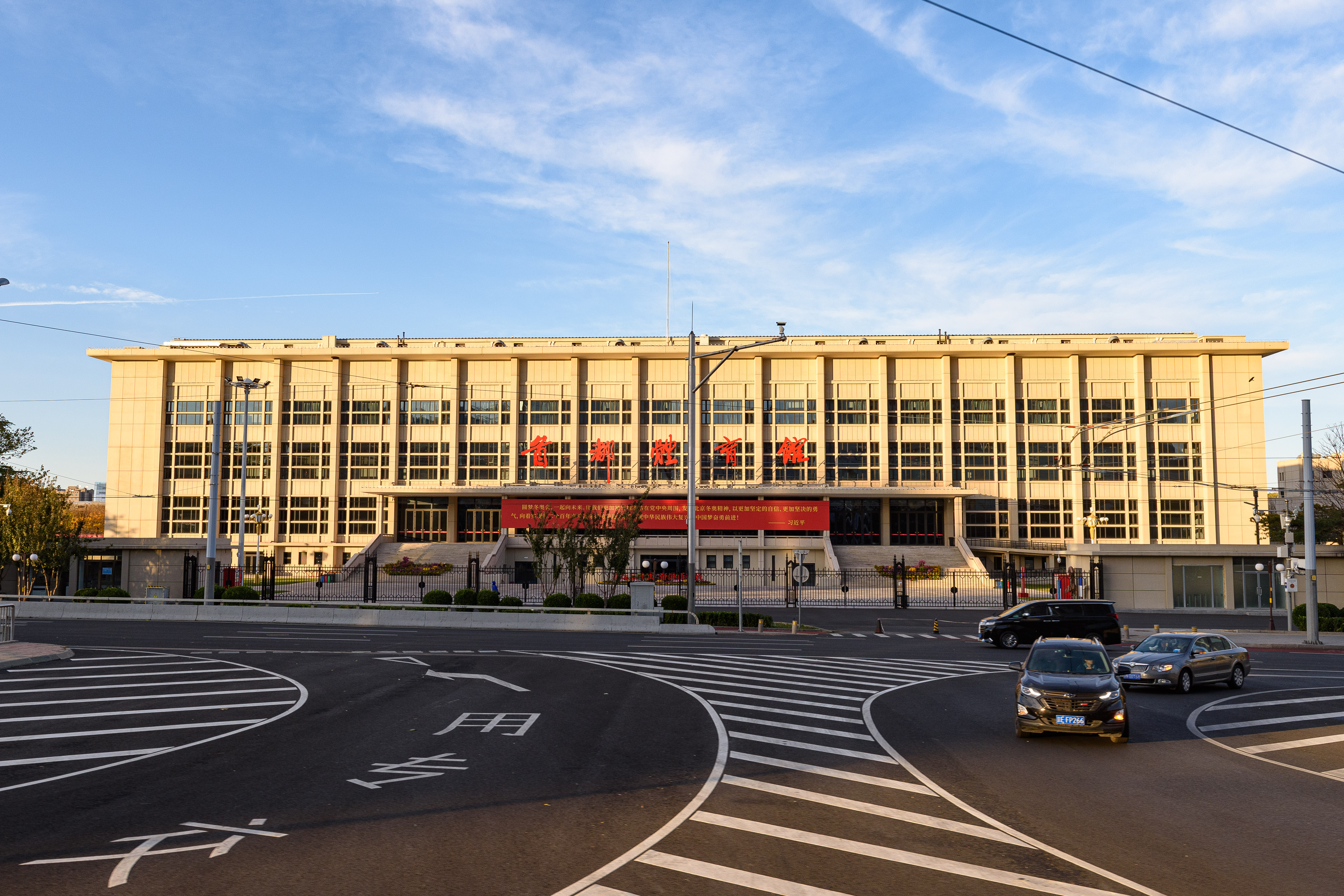
The figure skating events at the 2022 Winter Olympics were held at the Capital Indoor Stadium in Beijing, China.

The women's singles figure skating competition at the 2022 Winter Olympics was held on 15 and 17 February 2022 at the Capital Indoor Stadium in Beijing, China, and featured 30 skaters from 18 nations. Anna Shcherbakova and Alexandra Trusova, representing the Russian Olympic Committee, won the gold and silver medals, respectively, while Kaori Sakamoto of Japan won the bronze. The competition was overshadowed by controversy when it was reported that although Kamila Valieva of Russia had tested positive for a banned substance, the Court of Arbitration for Sport ruled that she be allowed to compete in the event pending a formal outcome of an investigation. Since Valieva originally finished in fourth place, her subsequent disqualification did not affect the awarding of the medals in this event.

== Background ==
In 2016, an independent report commissioned by the World Anti-Doping Agency (WADA) confirmed allegations that the Russian Olympic team had been involved in a state-sponsored doping program from at least late 2011 through February 2014, when Russia hosted the Winter Olympics in Sochi. On 9 December 2019, the WADA banned Russia from all international competitions after it found that data provided by the Russian Anti-Doping Agency had been manipulated by Russian authorities in order to protect athletes involved in its doping scheme. Under a ruling by the Court of Arbitration for Sport in December 2020, Russian athletes could not use the Russian flag or anthem in international competition and had to compete as "Neutral Athletes" or a "Neutral Team" at any world championships for the next two years. On 19 February 2021, it was announced that Russian athletes would compete under the name of the Russian Olympic Committee (ROC) at the 2020 Summer Olympics and 2022 Winter Olympics.

The women's singles event was one of five figure skating competitions contested at the 2022 Winter Olympics in Beijing, China. It was held at the Capital Indoor Stadium over two days: the short program took place on 15 February and the free skating took place on 17 February. The competition featured 30 skaters representing 18 nations. The three women selected by the Russian Olympic Committee – Kamila Valieva, Anna Shcherbakova, and Alexandra Trusova – were expected to dominate the Olympics. In addition to having won the 2022 European Figure Skating Championships, (Note: Kamila Valieva's results from the 2022 European Championships were among the scores later invalidated by the Court of Arbitration for Sport on 25 December 2021.) fifteen-year-old Valieva had dominated the season by winning every competition she entered. She broke the world records in the free skate and overall total at the 2021 Finlandia Trophy, bested those scores at the 2021 Skate Canada International, and bested them again at the 2021 Rostelecom Cup, where she also set a new world record in the short program. Seventeen-year-old Trusova, known as the "jumping fairy", was the first woman to successfully perform a quadruple Lutz, quadruple toe loop, and quadruple flip in international competition, while seventeen-year-old Shcherbakova had won the 2021 World Figure Skating Championships. Karen Chen of the United States likened women's figure skating to a two-tier competition, with the Russian women competing at levels beyond everyone else.

The 2022 Winter Olympics took place over two years into the COVID-19 pandemic and most events were closed to the public, with only selected events open to invited guests at a reduced capacity. To minimize the risk of virus transmission, China implemented strict health and safety measures, including a closed-loop system that segregated participants from the general public, frequent testing, and quarantine protocols for participants. Amid increasing lockdowns across China and the first detected case of the Omicron variant in Beijing, ticket sales to the general public were cancelled and it was announced that limited numbers of spectators would be admitted by invitation only.

== Qualification ==
Twenty-four quota spots in women's singles were awarded based on the results at the 2021 World Figure Skating Championships. An additional six quota spots were earned at the 2021 Nebelhorn Trophy.

Qualifying nations in women's singles
Event	Skaters per NOC	Qualifying NOCs	Total skaters
2021 World Championships	3	ROC; Japan	24
2021 World Championships	2	United States; South Korea	24
2021 World Championships	1	Belgium; Austria; Azerbaijan; Canada; Estonia; Sweden; Netherlands; Bulgaria; Germany; Georgia; China; Czech Republic; Great Britain; Finland	24
2021 Nebelhorn Trophy	1	United States; Poland; Belarus; Switzerland; Ukraine; Australia	6
Total			30

== Kamila Valieva controversy ==
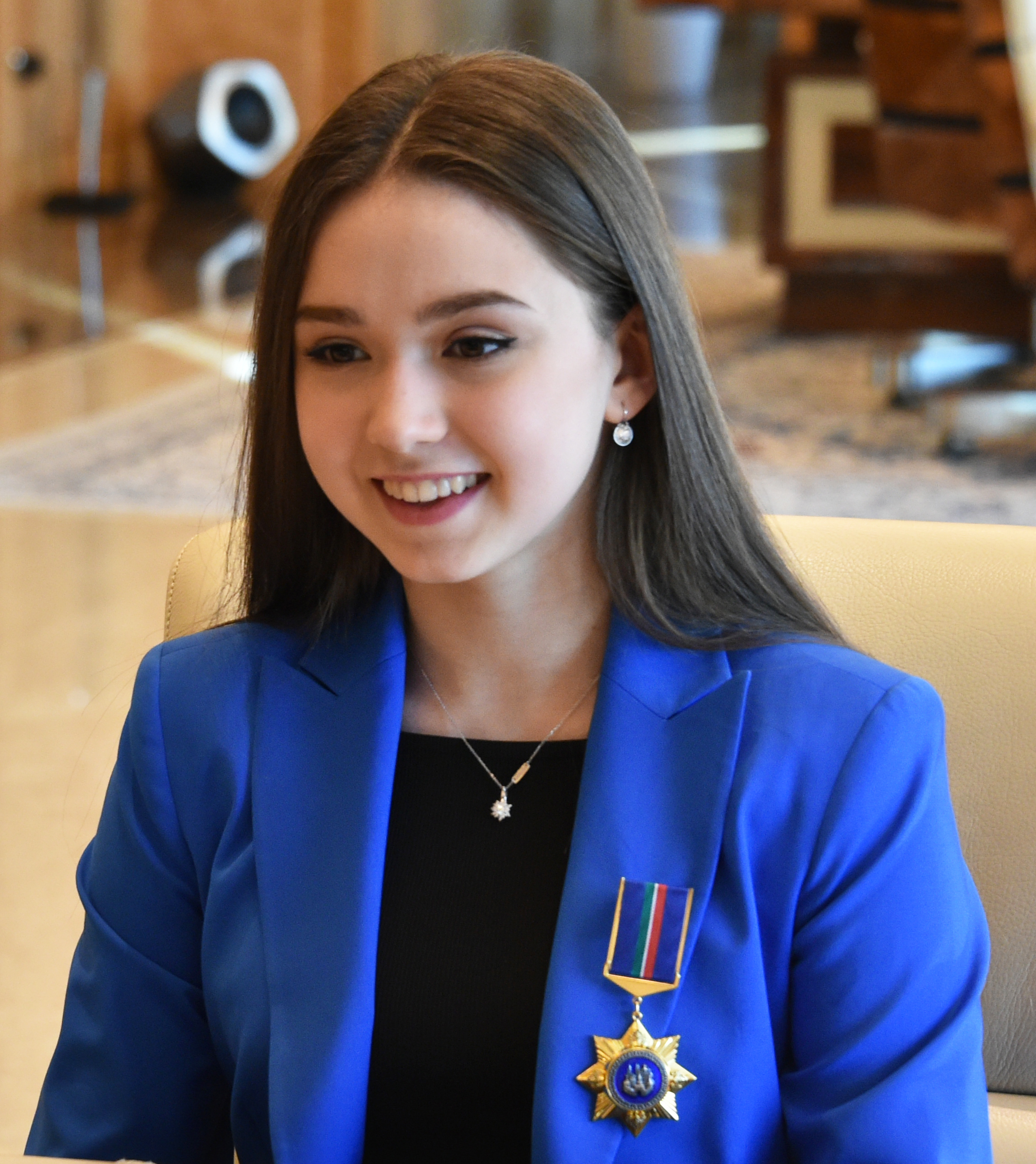
Kamila Valieva of Russia was suspended by the Court of Arbitration for Sport for a period of four years after testing positive for trimetazidine. Her results from the 2022 Winter Olympics were also struck.

The medal ceremony for the figure skating team event, originally scheduled for 8 February, was delayed over what International Olympic Committee (IOC) spokesperson Mark Adams described as a situation that required legal consultation with the International Skating Union (ISU). Media outlets reported on 9 February that the issue was a positive drug test, administered in December 2021, for trimetazidine by Kamila Valieva, which was officially confirmed on 11 February. The Russian Anti-Doping Agency (RUSADA), under suspension from the World Anti-Doping Agency (WADA) for hiding the positive doping results of Russian athletes for years, cleared Valieva to compete on 9 February, a day after the December test results were released. The IOC and the ISU appealed that decision.

On 14 February, the Court of Arbitration for Sport ruled that Valieva be allowed to compete in the women's event on the grounds that preventing her from competing "would cause her irreparable harm in the circumstances", though her gold medal in the team event was still under consideration. The favorable decision from the Court was in part due to her age, as minor athletes were subject to different rules than adult athletes. As a result, the IOC announced that should Valieva finish in the top three, no medal ceremony would be held until the investigation was over. To allow for the possibility that her results might be disqualified, the IOC asked the ISU to expand the qualifying field for the free skate by one to twenty-five, contingent upon Valieva being one of the top twenty-four skaters to advance to the free skate.

== Required performance elements ==
Women performed their short programs on 15 February. Lasting no more than 2 minutes 40 seconds, the short program had to include the following elements: one double or triple Axel; one triple jump; one jump combination consisting of a double jump and a triple jump, or two triple jumps; one flying spin; one layback spin, sideways leaning spin, camel spin, or sit spin without a change of foot; one spin combination with a change of foot; and one step sequence using the full ice surface.

The twenty-five highest-scoring skaters after the short program advanced to the free skating, which they performed on 17 February. The free skate could last no more than 4 minutes, and had to include the following: seven jump elements, of which one had to be an Axel-type jump; three spins, of which one had to be a spin combination, one a flying spin, and one a spin with only one position; a step sequence; and a choreographic sequence.

== Judging ==
Skaters were judged according to the required technical elements of their program (such as jumps and spins), as well as the overall presentation of their program, based on five program components (skating skills, transitions, performance, composition, and musical interpretation). Each technical element in a figure skating performance was assigned a predetermined base point value and scored by a panel of nine judges on a scale from −5 to +5 based on the quality of its execution. Each Grade of Execution (GOE) from –5 to +5 was assigned a value as indicated on the Scale of Values. (Note: The International Skating Union had originally published a new Scale of Values for the 2020/21 season, but chose to cancel it, reverting back to the scale from the 2019–20 season.) For example, a triple Axel was worth a base value of 8.00 points, and a GOE of +3 was worth 2.40 points, so a triple Axel with a GOE of +3 earned 10.40 points. The judging panel's GOE for each element was determined by calculating the trimmed mean (the average after discarding the highest and lowest scores). The panel's scores for all elements were added together to generate a Total Elements Score. At the same time, the judges evaluated each performance based on the five aforementioned program components and assigned each a score from 0.25 to 10 in 0.25-point increments. The judging panel's final score for each program component was also determined by calculating the trimmed mean. Those scores were then multiplied by the factor shown on the chart below; the results were added together to generate a total Program Component Score.

Program component factoring
Discipline	Short program	Free skate
Women	0.80	1.60

Deductions were applied for certain violations, such as time infractions or falls. The Total Elements Score and Program Component Score were then added together, minus any deductions, to generate a final performance score for each skater.

== Results ==
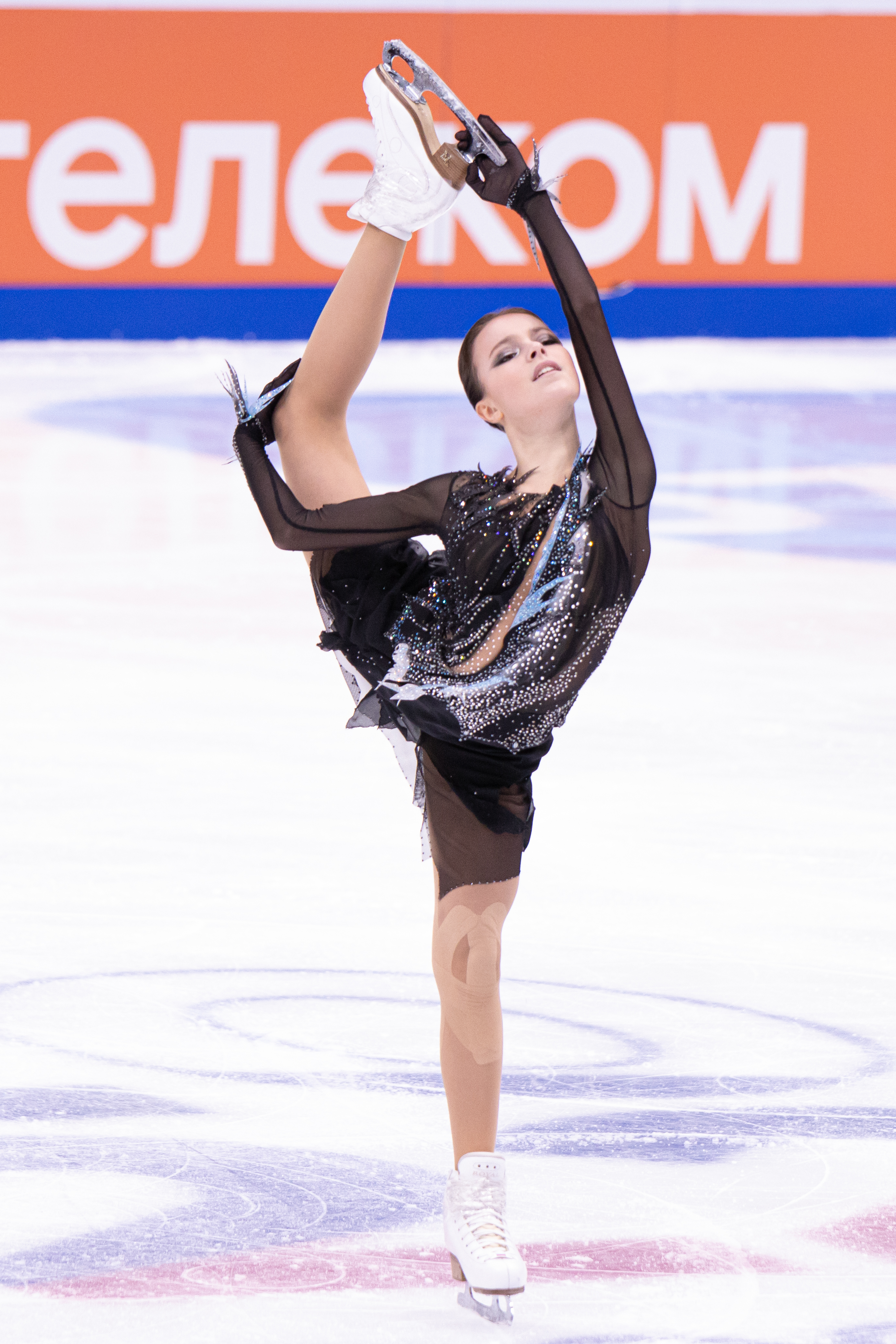
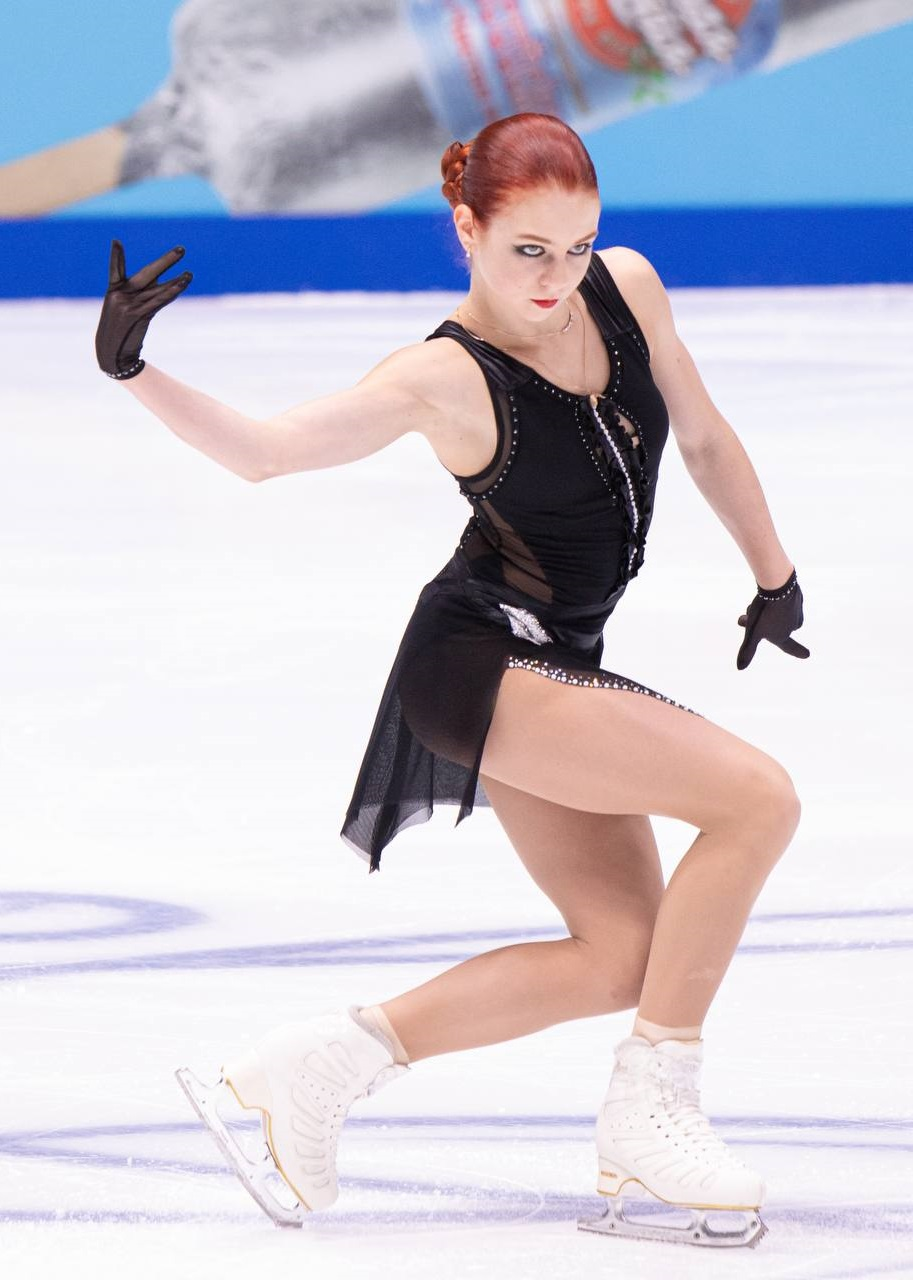
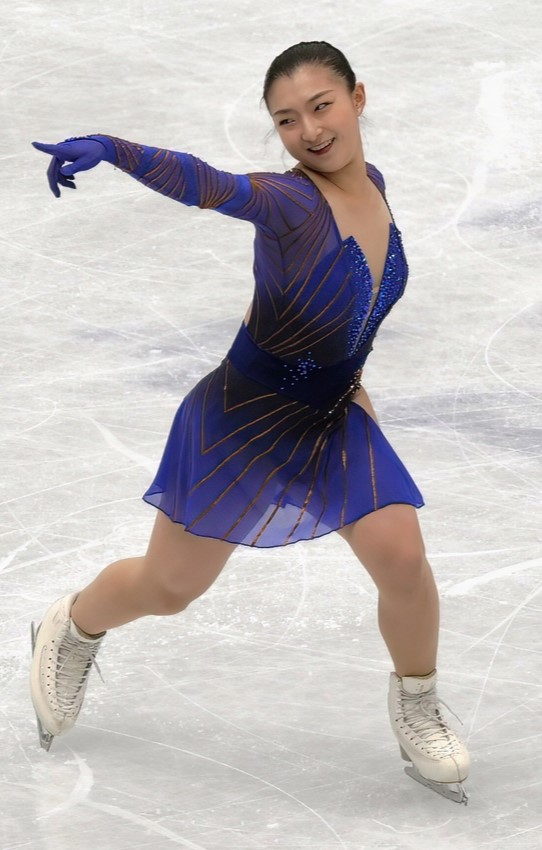
The gold, silver, and bronze medalists from the women's event at the 2022 Winter Olympics (from left to right):
Anna Shcherbakova of Russia (gold), Alexandra Trusova of Russia (silver), and Kaori Sakamoto of Japan (bronze)

Code key

- TSS – Total Segment Score
- TES – Total Elements Score
- PCS – Program Component Score
- SS – Skating skills
- TR – Transitions
- PE – Performance
- CO – Composition
- IN – Interpretation of the music
- DED – Deductions

=== Short program ===
The women's short program was held on 15 February. Kamila Valieva of Russia originally finished in first place, scoring 82.16 points, despite stumbling on her triple Axel. Anna Shcherbakova and Alexandra Trusova, also of Russia, finished in second and fourth places, respectively. Kaori Sakamoto of Japan finished in third place. Valieva's results in the competition were eventually voided by the Court of Arbitration for Sport in 2024.

Although the scandal surrounding Valieva dominated the news cycle, the other skaters focused on their own performances and avoided social media. "It's not easy being here," said Mariah Bell of the United States. "It's a tough situation for everyone." "I concentrated on myself and it didn't matter what was going on around me," commented Olga Mikutina of Austria. Lindsay van Zundert of the Netherlands stated: "It's just me, my skates, and my program and nothing else." With the possibility that Valieva's score might eventually be stricken, the International Olympic Committee allowed the top twenty-five skaters to advance to the free skate, as opposed to the usual twenty-four.

Women's short program results
Pl.	Skater	Nation	TSS	TES	PCS	SS	TR	PE	CO	IN	DED
1	Anna Shcherbakova	ROC	80.20	42.87	37.33	9.14	9.18	9.46	9.43	9.46	0.00
2	Kaori Sakamoto	Japan	79.84	43.22	36.62	9.29	8.93	9.21	9.18	9.18	0.00
3	Alexandra Trusova	ROC	74.60	40.12	35.48	8.75	8.71	8.96	8.96	8.96	1.00
4	Wakaba Higuchi	Japan	73.51	39.53	33.98	8.61	8.25	8.54	8.50	8.57	0.00
5	You Young	South Korea	70.34	36.80	33.54	8.43	8.21	8.46	8.46	8.36	0.00
6	Loena Hendrickx	Belgium	70.09	36.09	34.00	8.50	8.29	8.43	8.61	8.68	0.00
7	Alysa Liu	United States	69.50	36.85	32.65	8.14	8.00	8.32	8.21	8.14	0.00
8	Kim Ye-lim	South Korea	67.78	35.27	32.51	8.21	7.96	8.21	8.14	8.11	0.00
9	Anastasiia Gubanova	Georgia	65.40	34.43	30.97	7.71	7.50	7.79	7.75	7.96	0.00
10	Mariah Bell	United States	65.38	33.43	32.95	8.25	8.07	8.25	8.25	8.36	1.00
11	Eliška Březinová	Czech Republic	64.31	35.74	28.57	7.14	6.86	7.29	7.18	7.25	0.00
12	Karen Chen	United States	64.11	31.24	33.87	8.50	8.32	8.36	8.61	8.54	1.00
13	Nicole Schott	Germany	63.13	33.01	30.12	7.50	7.25	7.61	7.57	7.71	0.00
14	Mana Kawabe	Japan	62.69	33.66	30.03	7.75	7.32	7.46	7.54	7.46	1.00
15	Ekaterina Ryabova	Azerbaijan	61.82	32.43	29.39	7.36	7.11	7.54	7.36	7.36	0.00
16	Viktoriia Safonova	Belarus	61.46	32.72	28.74	7.18	7.04	7.25	7.25	7.21	0.00
17	Olga Mikutina	Austria	61.14	32.54	28.60	7.14	6.96	7.32	7.21	7.11	0.00
18	Alexia Paganini	Switzerland	61.06	32.03	29.03	7.39	6.96	7.32	7.29	7.32	0.00
19	Madeline Schizas	Canada	60.53	29.61	30.92	7.71	7.54	7.75	7.82	7.82	0.00
20	Eva-Lotta Kiibus	Estonia	59.55	30.89	29.66	7.32	7.25	7.46	7.46	7.57	1.00
21	Lindsay van Zundert	Netherlands	59.24	32.12	27.12	6.71	6.46	7.00	6.86	6.86	0.00
22	Alexandra Feigin	Bulgaria	59.16	32.36	26.80	6.64	6.57	6.79	6.79	6.71	0.00
23	Ekaterina Kurakova	Poland	59.08	28.42	30.66	7.68	7.36	7.68	7.75	7.86	0.00
24	Jenni Saarinen	Finland	56.97	27.79	29.18	7.32	7.04	7.29	7.36	7.46	0.00
25	Josefin Taljegård	Sweden	54.51	26.11	28.40	6.68	6.75	7.29	7.32	7.46	0.00
26	Zhu Yi	China	53.44	26.37	27.07	6.82	6.61	6.75	6.86	6.79	0.00
27	Natasha McKay	Great Britain	52.54	26.20	27.34	6.71	6.71	6.86	7.00	6.89	1.00
28	Kailani Craine	Australia	49.93	22.78	27.15	6.86	6.57	6.79	6.82	6.89	0.00
29	Anastasiia Shabotova	Ukraine	48.68	24.04	25.64	6.61	6.29	6.25	6.57	6.32	1.00
DSQ	Kamila Valieva	ROC	~~82.16~~	~~44.51~~	~~37.65~~	~~9.50~~	~~9.29~~	~~9.39~~	~~9.46~~	~~9.43~~	~~0.00~~

=== Free skating ===
The women's free skating was held on 17 February. Kamila Valieva made a series of errors in her free skate that resulted in her finishing in fourth place overall. "That's the most mistakes we've ever seen Kamila make in a free skate," commented Johnny Weir on the NBC broadcast. Coach Eteri Tutberidze could be heard berating Valieva after she left the ice. Anna Shcherbakova ended up finishing in first place and winning the gold medal, while Alexandra Trusova finished in second place and Kaori Sakamoto finished in third. Valieva was in tears, while Trusova could be heard shouting, "I hate this sport; I won't go onto the ice again", in response to not winning the gold medal; with Johnny Weir providing translation from Russian to English in real time. Shcherbakova was alone when she learned she had won the gold medal. "You win the Olympics and you can't even celebrate," Weir commented.

Shcherbakova successfully landed both of her quadruple jumps, delivering a clean program that earned her a total of 255.95 points and the gold medal. Trusova landed five quadruple jumps, but still finished in second place. She later clarified her displeasure by saying that she was happy with her performance, but not with the judges' scores. Sakamoto was also crying, but tears of joy. "I don't have the big jumps as others would have, which is a big handicap," she said afterward. "That means I had to have perfect elements."

Valieva's fourth-place results were eventually annulled by the Court of Arbitration for Sport, and all skaters originally ranked below her moved up one spot.

Women's free skate results
Pl.	Skater	Nation	TSS	TES	PCS	SS	TR	PE	CO	IN	DED
1	Alexandra Trusova	ROC	177.13	106.16	70.97	9.00	8.57	9.07	8.79	8.93	0.00
2	Anna Shcherbakova	ROC	175.75	100.49	75.26	9.29	9.18	9.57	9.50	9.50	0.00
3	Kaori Sakamoto	Japan	153.29	78.90	74.39	9.46	9.04	9.39	9.32	9.29	0.00
4	You Young	South Korea	142.75	74.16	68.59	8.61	8.36	8.71	8.57	8.61	0.00
5	Wakaba Higuchi	Japan	140.93	72.67	69.26	8.71	8.46	8.68	8.75	8.68	1.00
6	Alysa Liu	United States	139.45	71.95	67.50	8.36	8.29	8.61	8.46	8.46	0.00
7	Mariah Bell	United States	136.92	68.25	68.67	8.46	8.39	8.71	8.57	8.79	0.00
8	Loena Hendrickx	Belgium	136.70	66.19	70.51	8.71	8.57	8.82	8.93	9.04	0.00
9	Anastasiia Gubanova	Georgia	135.58	70.06	65.52	8.14	7.89	8.32	8.29	8.32	0.00
10	Kim Ye-lim	South Korea	134.85	68.61	66.24	8.36	8.07	8.32	8.36	8.29	0.00
11	Ekaterina Kurakova	Poland	126.76	66.24	60.52	7.57	7.32	7.71	7.61	7.61	0.00
12	Viktoriia Safonova	Belarus	123.37	65.54	57.83	7.36	7.07	7.21	7.29	7.21	0.00
13	Olga Mikutina	Austria	121.06	61.12	59.94	7.50	7.43	7.46	7.57	7.50	0.00
14	Ekaterina Ryabova	Azerbaijan	118.15	59.58	58.57	7.50	7.18	7.39	7.29	7.25	0.00
15	Lindsay van Zundert	Netherlands	116.57	61.74	54.83	6.71	6.64	7.07	6.89	6.96	0.00
16	Karen Chen	United States	115.82	51.61	65.21	8.32	8.04	7.93	8.29	8.18	1.00
17	Madeline Schizas	Canada	115.03	53.68	62.35	7.75	7.61	7.71	7.96	7.93	1.00
18	Nicole Schott	Germany	114.52	56.28	60.24	7.61	7.29	7.50	7.64	7.61	2.00
19	Eva-Lotta Kiibus	Estonia	112.20	54.27	58.93	7.43	7.11	7.36	7.46	7.46	1.00
20	Eliška Březinová	Czech Republic	111.10	54.81	58.29	7.36	7.07	7.25	7.43	7.32	2.00
21	Alexia Paganini	Switzerland	107.85	50.01	57.84	7.29	6.96	7.29	7.36	7.25	0.00
22	Mana Kawabe	Japan	104.04	47.87	60.17	7.86	7.54	7.25	7.64	7.32	4.00
23	Alexandra Feigin	Bulgaria	100.15	49.89	51.26	6.54	6.21	6.46	6.46	6.36	1.00
24	Jenni Saarinen	Finland	96.07	45.96	54.11	7.07	6.68	6.46	6.82	6.79	4.00
DSQ	Kamila Valieva	ROC	~~141.93~~	~~73.31~~	~~70.62~~	~~9.11~~	~~8.89~~	~~8.46~~	~~9.04~~	~~8.64~~	~~0.00~~

=== Overall ===
Women's results
Rank	Skater	Nation	Total	SP		FS	
1st place, gold medalist(s)	Anna Shcherbakova	ROC	255.95	1	80.20	2	175.75
2nd place, silver medalist(s)	Alexandra Trusova	ROC	251.73	3	74.60	1	177.13
3rd place, bronze medalist(s)	Kaori Sakamoto	Japan	233.13	2	79.84	3	153.29
4	Wakaba Higuchi	Japan	214.44	4	73.51	5	140.93
5	You Young	South Korea	213.09	5	70.34	4	142.75
6	Alysa Liu	United States	208.95	7	69.50	6	139.45
7	Loena Hendrickx	Belgium	206.79	6	70.09	8	136.70
8	Kim Ye-lim	South Korea	202.63	8	67.78	10	134.85
9	Mariah Bell	United States	202.30	10	65.38	7	136.92
10	Anastasiia Gubanova	Georgia	200.98	9	65.40	9	135.58
11	Ekaterina Kurakova	Poland	185.84	23	59.08	11	126.76
12	Viktoriia Safonova	Belarus	184.83	16	61.46	12	123.37
13	Olga Mikutina	Austria	182.20	17	61.14	13	121.06
14	Ekaterina Ryabova	Azerbaijan	179.97	15	61.82	14	118.15
15	Karen Chen	United States	179.93	12	64.11	16	115.82
16	Nicole Schott	Germany	177.65	13	63.13	18	114.52
17	Lindsay van Zundert	Netherlands	175.81	21	59.24	15	116.57
18	Madeline Schizas	Canada	175.56	19	60.53	17	115.03
19	Eliška Březinová	Czech Republic	175.41	11	64.31	20	111.10
20	Eva-Lotta Kiibus	Estonia	171.75	20	59.55	19	112.20
21	Alexia Paganini	Switzerland	168.91	18	61.06	21	107.85
22	Mana Kawabe	Japan	166.73	14	62.69	22	104.04
23	Alexandra Feigin	Bulgaria	159.31	22	59.16	23	100.15
24	Jenni Saarinen	Finland	153.04	24	56.97	24	96.07
25	Josefin Taljegård	Sweden	54.51	25	54.51	Did not advance to free skate	
26	Zhu Yi	China	53.44	26	53.44	Did not advance to free skate	
27	Natasha McKay	Great Britain	52.54	27	52.54	Did not advance to free skate	
28	Kailani Craine	Australia	49.93	28	49.93	Did not advance to free skate	
29	Anastasiia Shabotova	Ukraine	48.68	29	48.68	Did not advance to free skate	
DSQ	Kamila Valieva	ROC	~~224.09~~	DSQ	~~82.16~~	DSQ	~~141.93~~

== Aftermath ==
=== Resolution of Kamila Valieva's positive drug test ===
On 15 February, after the short program, The New York Times reported that Kamila Valieva's sample tested positive for an additional two substances, hypoxen and L-Carnitine, which were not on the list of banned substances, in addition to trimetazidine. The filing by the World Anti-Doping Agency (WADA) indicated that her acknowledgement of having taken the two permitted substances undercut her testimony that the banned substance was ingested by error. In mid-November, the WADA requested that the Court of Arbitration for Sport (CAS) take up a review of the case, seeking a four-year suspension of Valieva, which would exclude her from competition at the 2026 Winter Olympics, and disqualify all of her results dating back to the date of her positive drug test (25 December 2021). According to WADA President Witold Bańka, the Russian Anti-Doping Agency (RUSADA) did not meet their deadline to deliver a verdict on Valieva's case.

The decision of the CAS to allow Valieva to compete despite her positive test drew backlash across the sporting community and in the media, with some questioning as to whether Russia had been adequately punished for their statewide doping program. While the United States Olympic & Paralympic Committee and the Canadian Olympic Committee blasted the decision as a "disappointment" and "extremely unfortunate", the Russian Olympic Committee vowed to take "comprehensive measures" to "keep the Olympic gold medal won [from the team event]". Condemnation of the CAS decision also came from former and current figure skaters on social media, although several skaters defended Valieva. Some commenting on the situation suggested that blame should not rest with the 15-year-old Valieva, but rather with the Russian system and the coaches and doctors around her. Due to Valieva being a minor, both WADA and RUSADA launched investigations into her entourage, which included coach Eteri Tutberidze and team doctor Filipp Shvetsky. The Russian government and community remained steadfast in their support for Valieva. Kremlin spokesman Dmitry Peskov first referred to the situation as a "misunderstanding", and later issued the following statement: "We boundlessly and fully support Kamila Valieva and call on everyone to support her. ... And we say to Kamila: Kamila, do not hide your face, you are Russian, walk proudly everywhere and, most importantly, perform and defeat everyone".

After the short program on 15 February, when asked about Valieva by the media, skaters largely tried to distance themselves from the situation, indicating that they preferred to focus on their own performances. A few athletes made references about supporting "clean sport" and a "level playing field". Some expressed regret that no medal ceremony for the team event would be held. Valieva herself did not speak with reporters or attend the press conference after the short program, where Anna Shcherbakova and Kaori Sakamoto also declined to comment.

In a press conference the day after the free skate, International Olympic Committee (IOC) president Thomas Bach said he was very disturbed by the "chilling atmosphere" surrounding Valieva as Eteri Tutberidze berated her following the mistake-filled performance that resulted in her finishing in fourth place. Bach also insinuated that her coaches likely played a role in her positive test, saying that "doping is very rarely done alone with the athletes", and that "the ones who have administered this drug in her body, these are the ones who are guilty." The Kremlin responded that "harshness of a coach in high-level sport is key for their athletes to achieve victories" and that Tutberidze's athletes were seeing strong results. Tutberidze herself claimed to be "at a loss" regarding Bach's comments. Some Western media outlets pointed to the extreme emotional reactions of the three Russian skaters as further evidence of the extreme pressure they were under to deliver results, as well as the abuse to which they were subjected: Anna Shcherbakova stated that she felt empty inside, Alexandra Trusova could be heard shouting that she "hated the sport" and swore she would never skate again, and Valieva broke down sobbing.

In January 2023, RUSADA cleared Valieva of any wrongdoing. Travis Tygart, CEO of the U.S. Anti-Doping Agency (USADA), criticized both WADA and the ISU for not taking the matter directly to the CAS.

WADA and the ISU have to appeal this decision, for the sake of the credibility of the anti-doping system and the rights of all athletes. The world can't possibly accept this self-serving decision by RUSADA, which in the recent past has been a key instrument of Russia’s state sponsored doping fraud and is non-compliant. Justice demands a full, fair, public hearing outside of Russia.

— Travis Tygart, CEO of the U.S. Anti-Doping Agency (USADA)

On 29 January 2024, the CAS disqualified Valieva for four years retroactive to 25 December 2021 for the positive test for trimetazidine, which they ruled constituted an anti-doping rule violation. On 30 January 2024, the ISU, among other actions, voided Valieva's fourth-place finish in the women's competition.

=== Increase to minimum age requirement ===
At the ISU Congress held in June 2022, members of the ISU Council accepted a proposal to gradually increase the minimum age for senior competition to seventeen beginning with the 2024–2025 season. In order to avoid forcing skaters who had already competed at the senior level to return to the junior level, the age limit remained unchanged during the 2022–2023 season, before increasing to sixteen for the 2023–2024 season, and then to seventeen for the 2024–2025 season. Although there had been previous proposals to increase this age limit, the 2022 vote gained traction following the 2022 Winter Olympics.

== Works cited ==
- "Special Regulations & Technical Rules – Single & Pair Skating and Ice Dance 2021". International Skating Union. Archived from the original on 4 April 2022.
