= Kamila Valieva =

Russian figure skater (born 2006)

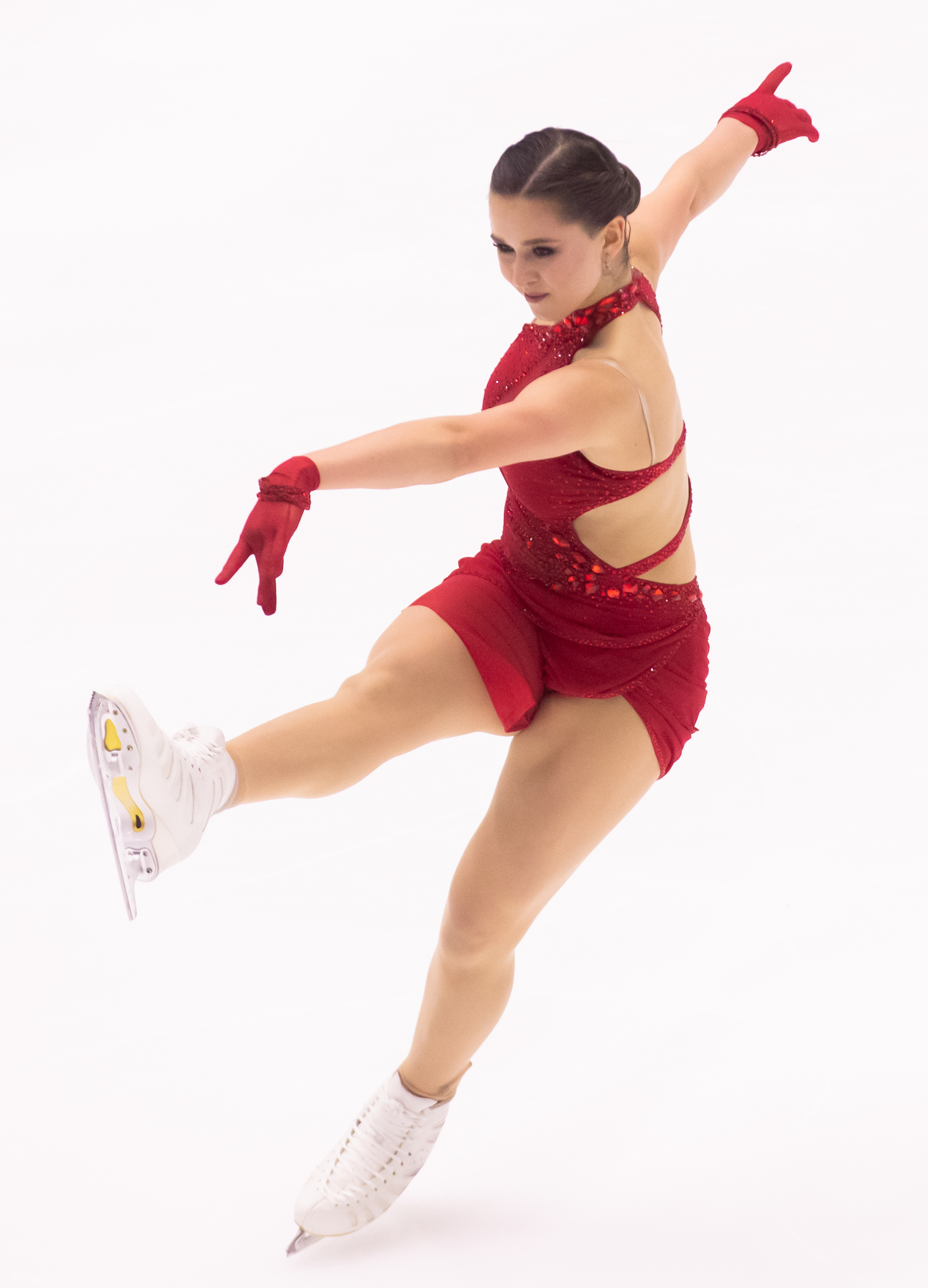
- Valieva at the 2023 Russian Grand Prix in Kazan

Personal information
- Native name: Камила Валерьевна Валиева (Russian)
- Full name: Kamila Valeryevna Valieva
- Born: 26 April 2006 (age 20) Kazan, Russia
- Height: 1.60 m (5 ft 3 in) (February 2022)

Figure skating career
- Country: Russia
- Discipline: Women's singles
- Coach: Eteri Tutberidze; Sergei Dudakov; Daniil Gleikhengauz
- Skating club: Sambo 70 (Khrustalnyi)
- Began skating: 2009
- Highest WS: 7th (2021–22)

Medal record
Olympic Games
DSQ	2022 Beijing	Team
European Championships
DSQ	2022 Tallinn	Singles
Russian Championships
Silver medal – second place	2021 Chelyabinsk	Singles
DSQ	2022 Saint Petersburg	Singles
World Junior Championships
Gold medal – first place	2020 Tallinn	Singles
Junior Grand Prix Final
Gold medal – first place	2019–20 Turin	Singles

Kamila Valeryevna Valieva (Russian: Камила Валерьевна Валиева [vɐˈlʲi(ɪ̯)ɪvə], born 26 April 2006) is a Russian figure skater. She is the 2021 Rostelecom Cup champion, the 2021 Skate Canada champion, the 2020 Junior World champion, the 2019–20 Junior Grand Prix Final champion and the 2021 Russian national silver medalist.

During the 2022 Winter Olympics, a sample that Valieva had submitted for a drug test in December tested positive for trimetazidine. On 29 January 2024, the Court of Arbitration for Sport (CAS) ruled in Valieva's doping case involving the Russian Anti-Doping Agency (RUSADA). The International Skating Union (ISU) and World Anti-Doping Agency (WADA) imposed a four-year ban on Valieva backdated to 25 December 2021, and disqualified her of all competitive results from that date, including the first-place finishes at the 2022 European Figure Skating Championships and the 2022 Olympic team event.

Valieva is, in spite of disqualifications, still the current world record holder for the women's short program, free skating, and total scores. She has set seven world records during her career. She is the first female skater to break the 250-, 260- and 270-point thresholds in the total score (all within one season), and the first to break the 170- and 180-point thresholds in the free skate. She is also the second woman to land the quadruple toe loop after training partner and teammate Alexandra Trusova, the fourth woman to land a quadruple jump of any kind, the 16th woman to land a triple Axel, and the third woman to land a triple Axel and quadruple jump in the same program after Alysa Liu and training partner and teammate Sofia Akateva.

== Personal life ==
Valieva was born on 26 April 2006 in Kazan, Tatarstan, Russia. She is of Volga Tatar ethnicity. Her patronym is the Russian "Valeryevna", but according to relatives her biological father is a Tatar named Ravil, a "military man who now lives in Crimea".

Valieva has one pet dog, a Pomeranian named Lëva (Lyova), given to her in 2019 by fans. Valieva was enrolled in rhythmic gymnastics, ballet, and figure skating classes at an early age by her mother but was encouraged to focus solely on skating after turning five. She has named Nathan Chen as one of the skaters whose technique and ability she admires. Like her teammate Alexandra Trusova, she prefers to use white Edea Piano skating boots with silver blades in competition.

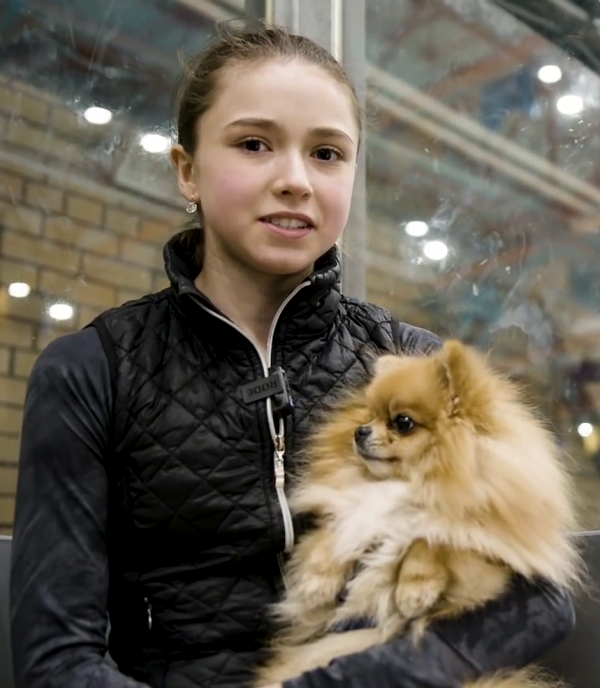
Valieva and her dog, a Pomeranian named Lëva, May 2021

At the time of the 2022 Winter Olympics, Valieva was 1.6 m (5 ft 3 in) tall.

== Career ==
=== Early career ===
Valieva began skating in 2009 in RSDUSSHOR in Kazan. Ksenia Ivanova first coached her, followed by Marina Kudriavtseva and Igor Lyutikov, and Natalia Dubinskaya. When she turned six, her parents moved her to Moscow to train at SSHOR Moskvich. In the spring of 2018, Valieva switched skating clubs to Sambo-70, where Eteri Tutberidze allowed Valieva to join her group. Videos are available of Valieva's first competition at age 4 as well as a later one at age 9.

In the 2018–19 season, before her international debut, recordings of Valieva's short program, set to Spiegel im Spiegel by Arvo Pärt and inspired by Pablo Picasso's painting Girl on a Ball, received worldwide attention. Tutberidze described it as her favorite program of the year. The program also drew the notice of Picasso's granddaughter Diana Widmaier Picasso, who invited Valieva to visit her in Paris. Among other victories that season, she won the Russian Younger Age Championships ahead of training mates Sofia Akateva and Sofia Samodelkina. It was later announced that Valieva would keep her short program for her international debut in the upcoming season. (After Alena Kostornaia finished her career, Valieva joined the TSC trio instead of Kostornaia and after she joined the trio became TSCV) ru: ТЩК-ТЩВ

=== 2019–2020 season: Junior World champion ===
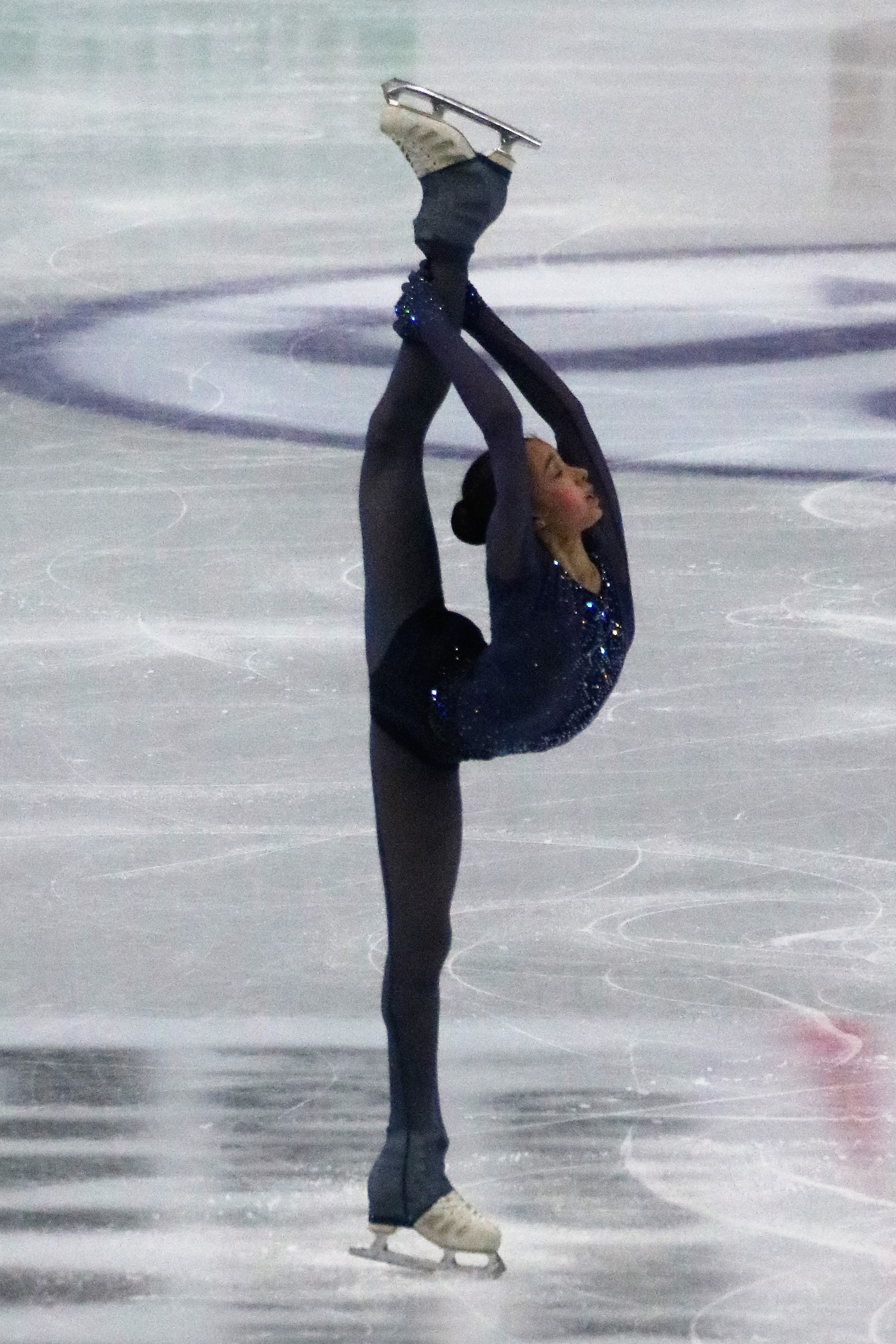
Valieva performing an extended biellmann at the 2019–20 Junior Grand Prix Final

Valieva's international debut came in late August 2019 at a Junior Grand Prix competition in Courchevel, France. Ranked third in the short program and first in the free skate, she won the gold medal ahead of Wi Seo-yeong of South Korea and teammate and training partner Maiia Khromykh. At the competition, Valieva became the second female skater ever to land a quadruple toe loop in competition. Her total score at the event was the fourth highest score achieved by a ladies' single skater at the junior level, behind teammates Anna Shcherbakova, Trusova, and Kostornaia. Valieva also became the fourth junior female skater to score above 200 points under the current GOE (Grade of Execution) system.

One month later, at the 2020 JGP Russia, she placed first in both programs with personal best scores to take the title ahead of compatriots Ksenia Sinitsyna and Viktoria Vasilieva. She attempted two quadruple toe loops in the free skate for the first time, landing one. With two gold medals, she qualified in first place to the 2019–20 Junior Grand Prix Final in Turin, Italy.

Before the 2019–20 Junior Grand Prix Final in December, a minor injury prevented Valieva from training the quadruple toe loop jump. She entered the final as a co-favorite for the title along with Liu of the United States. After placing fourth in the short program, Valieva delivered a clean free skate to take the title ahead of Liu, who dropped from first place in the short program after under-rotating a triple Axel and both of her quad Lutzes, and training mate Daria Usacheva.

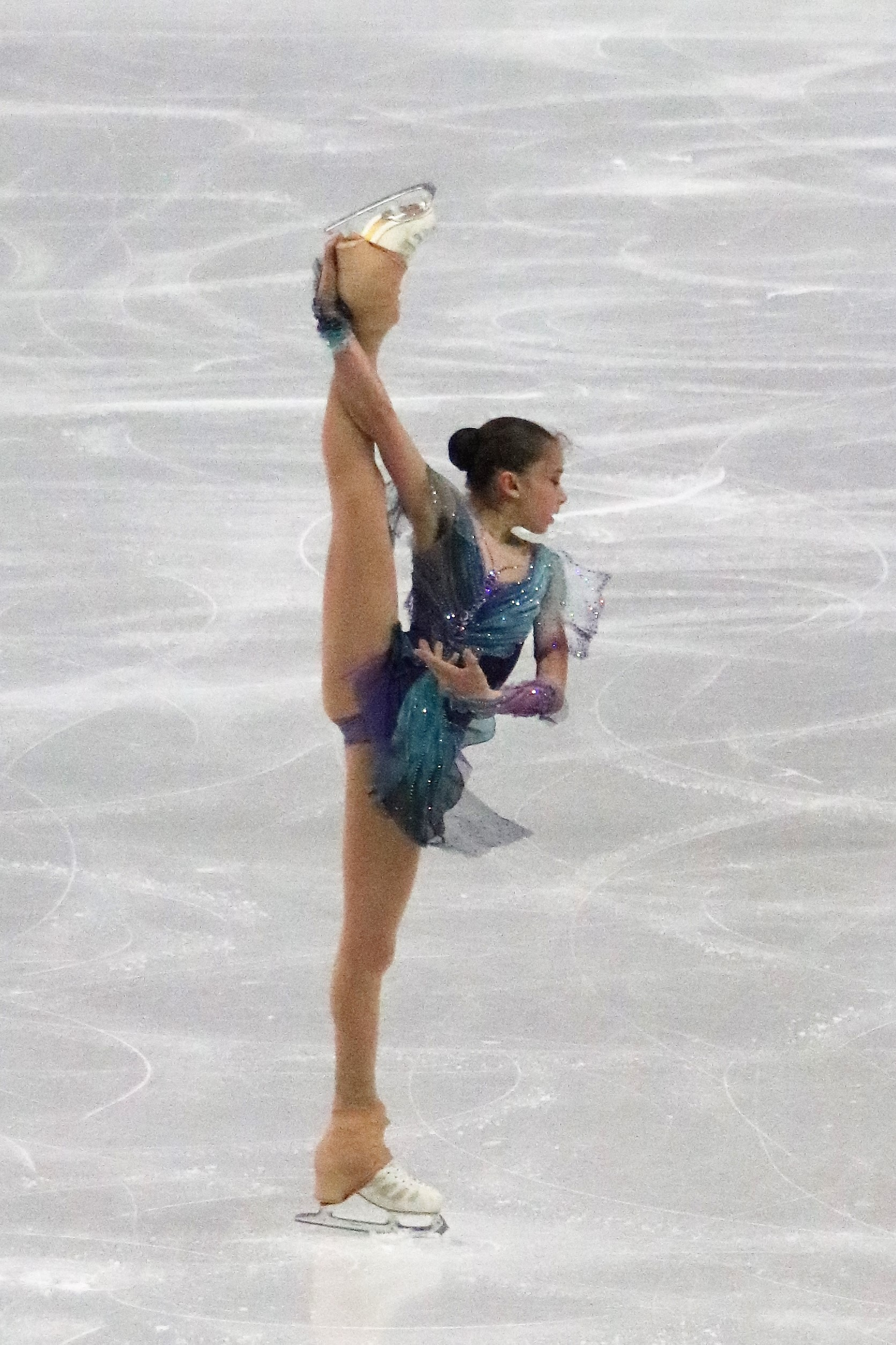
Kamila at the 2019–20 Junior Grand Prix Final

At 13 years old, Valieva was too young to enter the 2020 Russian Championships as a senior in December. In early February, Valieva instead competed at the 2020 Russian Junior Championships, which she won after placing first in both programs ahead of Akateva and Usacheva. She once again included two quadruple toe loop jumps in her free skate, after recovering from her previous injury, stepping out on one and landing another in combination with a double toe loop. After the competition, she was named to the Russian team for the 2020 World Junior Championships along with teammates Usacheva, who placed third, and Khromykh, who placed fifth; silver medalist Akateva and fourth-place finisher Samodelkina were too young to be eligible.

The 2020 World Junior Championships were again seen by many as a showdown between Valieva and Liu, who had recently defended her title at the senior-level 2020 U.S. Championships. Valieva placed first in the short program ahead of Lee Hae-in of South Korea and Usacheva, setting a new personal best. Her score of 74.92 points was the second-highest short program score ever for a junior female skater, only behind Kostornaia's short program at the 2018–19 Junior Grand Prix Final. In the free skate, she performed similarly to the Russian Junior Championships, stepping out on her opening quadruple toe loop and landing all other jumps cleanly, including a second quadruple toe loop in combination. She won the title and became the new Junior World Champion, ahead of Usacheva and Liu. Valieva remarked afterward, "there was a little mistake on the toe loop, but basically, I am pleased with my performance."

=== 2020–2021 season ===
Valieva skating her short program at the 2021 Russian Cup Final

Valieva skated at the 2020 Russian test skates in Moscow, showcasing her new programs for the 2020–21 season. She executed a quad toe combination in her free skate. She competed at the second stage of the Russian Cup. There, she skated cleanly, placing first in the short program but third in the free skate due to several unexpected mistakes. She won the silver medal. She later competed at the fifth stage of the Russian Cup. There, she placed first in the short program, with one step out on a triple Axel attempt. In the free skate, she also placed first, completing two quadruple toe loops (one in combination) and with only one mistake on a triple Lutz. She placed first, winning the gold medal with one of the highest total scores in Russian domestic competition.

Making her senior Russian Championships debut, Valieva placed second in the short program despite falling on her triple Axel. She also placed second in the free skate with two clean quads landed, and, despite an under rotated triple flip, won the silver medal.

Following the national championships, Valieva participated in the 2021 Channel One Trophy, a televised team competition organized in lieu of the canceled European Championships. Selected to the Red Machine team by captain Alina Zagitova, Valieva won both the short program and free skates, helping her team win the trophy. At her final event of the season, Valieva participated in the senior Russian Cup Final, winning the short program by a wide margin. In the free skate, she attempted a quadruple salchow in competition for the first time but fell and made additional errors on both quad toe loop attempts. As a result, she finished third in the segment; however, the strength of her short program score allowed her to win the overall event by 2.04 points over Khromykh.

=== 2021–2022 season: Beijing Olympics ===
Valieva made her international senior debut at the 2021 CS Finlandia Trophy. She placed third in the short program after falling on her triple Axel attempt. In her free skate, she landed three quad jumps, recording a world record score of 174.31 points, also setting a new world record for total points (249.24).

Making her senior Grand Prix debut at the 2021 Skate Canada International, Valieva won the short program with a new personal best score of 84.19, 2.95 points ahead of Elizaveta Tuktamysheva in second place. She skated a clean program in the free skate with three quads and only one minor mistake in her triple Axel. Once again, she set a new world record for the women's free skate (180.89) and a total score (265.08). Valieva's second assignment of the season was the 2021 Rostelecom Cup, held this year at Sochi's Iceberg Skating Palace, the host venue for skating events at the 2014 Winter Olympics, instead of in Moscow as usual. In the short program, she scored 87.42 points, breaking Kostornaia's previous world record of 85.45. She went on to raise the world records in the free skate (185.29) and total score (272.71). Valieva's results qualified her to the Grand Prix Final, which was subsequently canceled due to travel and gathering restrictions prompted by the spread of the Omicron variant of SARS-CoV-2 during the COVID-19 pandemic.

On 24 December, Valieva placed first in the short program at the 2022 Russian Championships, nearly 10 points ahead of Shcherbakova in second place. She scored 193.10 for her free skate, with a gold medal-winning score of 283.48 points, nearly 35 points ahead of silver medalist Trusova. She remarked afterward, "I did almost my maximum." As national champion, she was guaranteed a berth on the Russian Olympic team. Valieva made her European Championships debut in January 2022 in Tallinn, Estonia. She finished first in the short program with a clean skate and apparently extended her world record score by over three points to become the first woman to break the 90-point barrier, which however was rescinded by the Court of Arbitration for Sport (CAS) in 2024 for a 2021 anti-doping violation. In the free skate, Valieva fell on her triple Axel attempt for the second time in competition this season but skated the rest of her program cleanly to narrowly win the segment over teammates Shcherbakova and Trusova to take the European title. This result too was nullified by the CAS in 2024. On 20 January, she was officially named to the Russian Olympic team.

Selected as the Russian entry in the women's segments of the Olympic team event, Valieva began the 2022 Winter Olympics with an apparent first-place finish in the short program with a clean triple Axel, scoring near her own world record. Valieva placed four ordinals above American skater Karen Chen, moving the Russian team into first place in the competition at the end of the short program segments. She was chosen for the women's free skate in the team event as well, apparently winning the segment with a program that included two clean quadruple jumps (salchow and toe loop) and a triple Axel, albeit with a fall on a second quadruple toe loop attempt. Her score was over 30 points clear of second-place finisher Kaori Sakamoto of Japan. The Russian Olympic Committee (ROC) team won the team event, but the medal ceremony was postponed pending an official investigation of filed allegations concerning possible doping, though Valieva was permitted to compete while the investigation is still in progress. In 2024, Valieva's results in this event were nullified and her team medal was stripped by a decision of the CAS, with her teammates demoted from gold to bronze medalists.

During the short program in the women's singles event at the Winter Olympics on 15 February, Valieva placed first ahead of Russian teammate Shcherbakova despite faltering during a triple Axel though not falling. During the free skate on 17 February, she stumbled or fell at least four times as she skated to Boléro. She wept as she left the ice and did not earn a place in the top three, finishing in fourth place behind her compatriots Shcherbakova and Trusova, who came first and second, and bronze medalist Sakamoto. Her fourth-place finish was also rescinded by the aforementioned CAS decision. All three Russian skaters landed quads in their routines, the only women at the Olympics to do so. In early March 2022, the IOC and ISU banned all figure skaters and officials from Russia and Belarus from attending the World Championships due to Russia's 2022 invasion of Ukraine therefore not allowing Valieva to participate in the competition in France at the end of March.

On 25–27 March, Valieva participated in 2022 Channel One Trophy, a Russian domestic competition. During the short program, she did not perform any triple Axel as usual; instead, she cleanly jumped a double Axel and scored 83.63 into first place. During free skating, Valieva cleanly jumped a quadruple toe loop and scored 173.88 in the second place behind Shcherbakova.

=== 2022–2025 seasons: Ban from competition ===
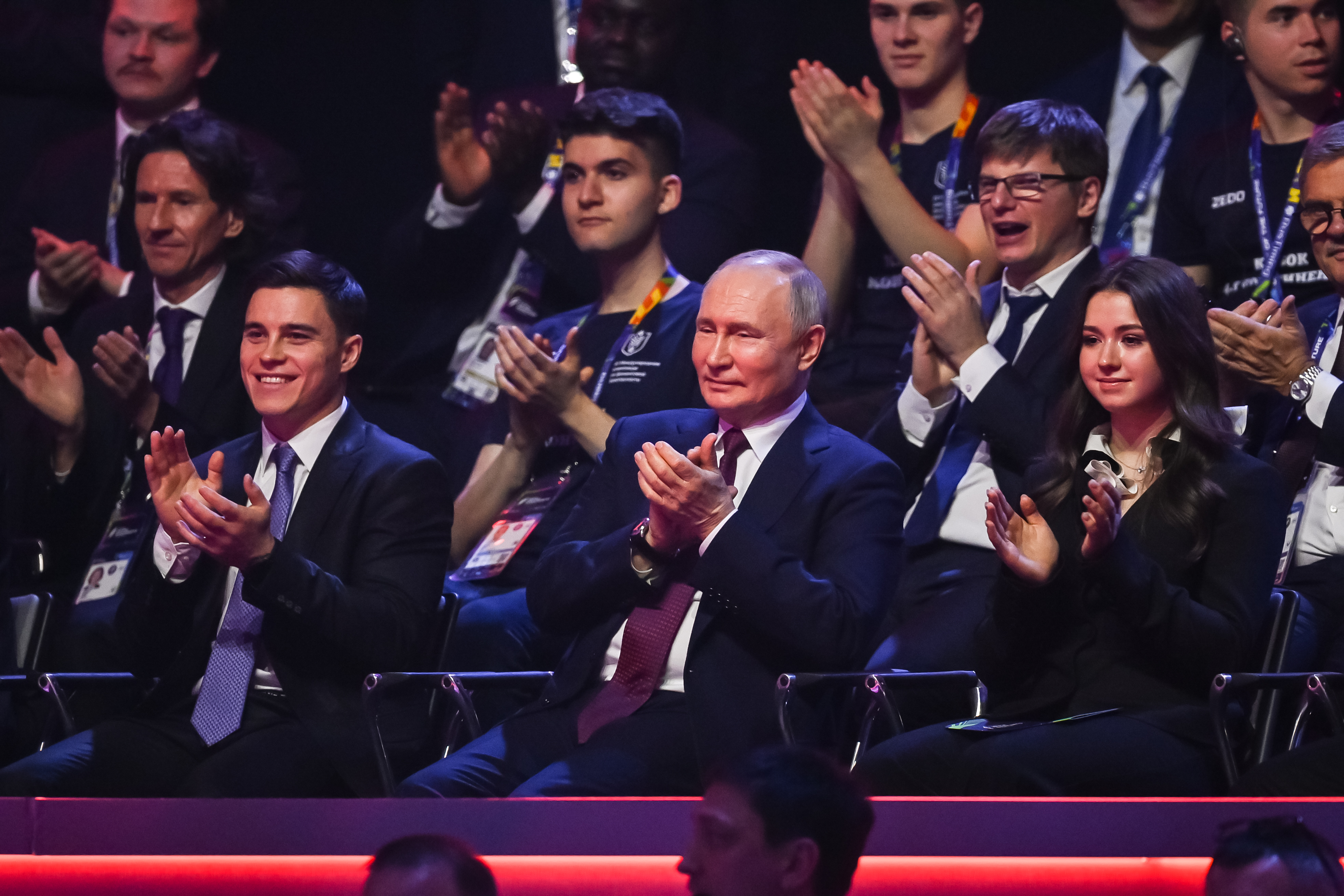
Valieva sitting next to Vladimir Putin on the opening ceremony of Russia's "Games of the Future" on 21 February 2024

Russian and Belarusian athletes remained banned from international events for the 2022–23 figure skating season, so the Russian Figure Skating Federation hosted its own domestic Grand Prix series. Valieva was scheduled for the first Grand Prix event, the Golden Skate of Moscow. In the free skate, she fell on a quadruple toe loop, but she still won the gold medal ahead of Sofia Akateva and Anastasiya Zinina. She then competed at the Grand Prix stage in her hometown, Kazan, and won another gold medal. She then competed at the Russian Championships held in Krasnoyarsk. In the short program, she popped her triple Axel and only performed a single Axel, causing her to finish in fourth place. She won the free skate with a score of 170.71, but still finished second overall behind Akateva.

Valieva competing at the 2023 Russian Grand Prix, Stage 4

On 13 January 2023, the Russian Anti-Doping Agency (RUSADA) stripped Valieva of her gold medal in senior women's singles of the 2022 Russian Figure Skating Championships stemming from her positive test for trimetazidine, a banned substance, on the second day of the Women's competition. The organization said that "Valieva had no fault in the positive drug test". However, RUSADA refused to strip her Olympic gold medal in the team event, prompting WADA to file a case to the Court of Arbitration for Sport. It was suspected that RUSADA decision was a 'half-measure' intended to preserve Russia's Olympic gold medal. Subsequently, Trusova became the gold medalist of the 2022 Russian Championships, with Shcherbakova moving up to silver and Adeliia Petrosian receiving the bronze medal.

Valieva was assigned to compete at stages four and six of the Russian Grand Prix series. She placed fourth at stage four in Kazan, subsequently winning the gold medal at stage six in Moscow two weeks later.

At the 2024 Russian Championships, Valieva finished first after the short program, later dropping to third place overall after the free skate.

On 29 January 2024, Valieva received a four-year ban from competition – the ban had been backdated to 25 December 2021, the date she took the failed test. CAS ordered "the disqualification all competitive results achieved" from that date.

=== 2025–2026 season: Return to competition ===
On 1 October 2025, it was announced that Valieva intended to return to competitive figure skating and had left longtime coaches Tutberidze, Sergei Dudakov, and Daniil Gleikhengauz to train under Svetlana Sokolovskaya at the Navka Arena. On 19 January 2026, Valieva was listed as a participant in the Russian Jumping Championship for February 2026. Her previous teammate Trusova was also listed to compete. Valieva announced that she would debut one of her new programs at the Channel One Cup in March 2026.

Valieva participated in the Russian Jumping Championship. She successfully landed multiple quadruple toe-loops and triple-triple combinations. In the duets segment, she was paired alongside Mark Kondratiuk. The pair finished in sixth place overall. In the women's semi-finals, Valieva finished in sixth place, unable to advance to the finals.

In March 2026, Valieva competed in the Channel One Trophy for Team Moscow. She debuted her new short program; her first time competing a short program since 2023. She placed 4th in the short program segment and scored 70.09 points.

=== 2026–2027 season ===
During the off season, Valieva worked alongside Benoît Richaud to create new programs for the upcoming season.

On 30 June 2026, the International Skating Union announced that figure skaters from Russia and Belarus would be allowed to compete at international competitions as Individual Neutral Athletes (AINs). Each of these skaters are required to undergo an individual assessment conducted by the ISU Council to determine whether they meet the criteria for neutral status. Valieva's application was approved, making her eligible to compete internationally as a neutral athlete.

Following the weeks of Valieva's neutral status being granted, it was later revoked following a letter sent to the ISU from the Ukrainian federation citing several questionings in regard to her neutral status due to her strong ties to President Putin and pro-Russia organizations and events. Seven other Russian skaters were named in the letter. Valieva challenged the ISU on their decision but was again denied. She was given three weeks to appeal the case with the Court of Arbitration of Sport. Ultimately, Valieva did not submit an appeal and her chance to do so exceeded the required deadline.

In late October, it was announced that Valieva had left Svetlana Sokolovskaya in favour of rejoining Eteri Tutberidze's group.

== Doping ==
On 25 December 2021, Valieva submitted a routine urine sample for analysis following her win at the Russian Nationals on 24 December. The normal 20-day testing time for the sample lapsed, apparently due to COVID-19 related backlogs at the testing laboratory; however, the positive doping test results were eventually forwarded for evaluation in February 2022, after the Beijing Olympics had started and the team event had concluded. On 14 November 2022, the Court of Arbitration for Sport (CAS) registered an appeal by the World Anti-Doping Agency (WADA) about a possible violation of anti-doping rules by Valieva.

=== During Beijing Olympics ===
The medal ceremony for the team event, in which the ROC won gold, was originally scheduled for 8 February but was delayed over what International Olympic Committee (IOC) spokesperson Mark Adams described as a situation that required "legal consultation" with the International Skating Union (ISU). Several media outlets reported on 9 February that the issue was a positive test by Valieva for the banned substance trimetazidine, which was officially confirmed on 11 February. The sample in question was taken by the Russian Anti-Doping Agency (RUSADA) at the 2022 Russian Figure Skating Championships on 25 December 2021. On 8 February, the urine sample tested positive for traces of trimetazidine. The sample was analyzed at the Doping Control Laboratory at Stockholm's Karolinska University Hospital, a WADA-accredited lab. The test result came one day after the team event concluded.

Valieva was given a provisional suspension after her positive result, but was cleared on appeal by RUSADA's independent Disciplinary Anti-Doping Committee (DAC) on 9 February, just a day later. Due to Valieva being a minor at the time and thus classified as a "protected person" under WADA guidelines, RUSADA and the IOC announced on 12 February that they would broaden the scope of their respective investigations to include members of her entourage, such as coaches and team doctors.

Following formal appeals lodged by the IOC, the ISU, and WADA to review RUSADA DAC's decision, the Court of Arbitration for Sport (CAS) heard the case on 13 February, ahead of her scheduled appearance in the women's singles event beginning 15 February. On 13 February, Valieva's mother testified at the CAS hearing that Valieva took hypoxen for heart "variations". According to an IOC representative, Valieva herself argued at the hearing that the positive test result was "due to contamination with [her] grandad's medicine". On 14 February, the CAS declined to reinstate Valieva's provisional suspension and ruled that she would be allowed to compete in the women's singles event. CAS decided that preventing her from competing "would cause her irreparable harm in the circumstances" while noting that any medals won by Valieva at the Beijing Olympics would be withheld pending the results of the continuing investigation into her doping violation. The accommodating decision from the court, subject to further and ongoing investigation, was made on three grounds: due to her age, she was a "protected person" per WADA code, subject to different rules than adult athletes; she "did not test positive during the Olympic Games in Beijing"; and "There were serious issues of untimely notification of the results ... which impinged upon the Athlete's ability to establish certain legal requirements for her benefit". The IOC announced that the medal ceremony for the team event would not take place until the investigation concluded as there is a concrete decision whether to strip Valieva and the ROC of their medals. US Olympic Committee CEO Sarah Hirshland said: "We are disappointed by the message this sends. This appears to be another chapter in the systemic and pervasive disregard for clean sport by Russia."

On 15 February, after placing first in the women's short program, Valieva was reported by The New York Times to have also tested positive for two other drugs that are not banned from competition, hypoxen and L-carnitine, from her 25 December urine sample. The combination of these drugs with trimetazidine was described as a "trifecta of substances" which "seem to be aimed at increasing endurance, reducing fatigue and promoting greater efficiency in using oxygen" by Travis Tygart, chief executive of the United States Anti-Doping Agency (USADA). At the time of the doping test, Valieva had declared taking hypoxen and L-carnitine, both of which are used in Russia supposedly to treat heart conditions or enhance athletic performance. According to The New York Times, neither agent is backed by scientific evidence of efficacy in improving cardiovascular function in athletes. To allow for the possibility that Valieva's results may be disqualified following investigation, the IOC asked the ISU to expand the qualifying field for the women's singles free skating by one to 25, contingent upon Valieva being one of the top 24 skaters after the short program.

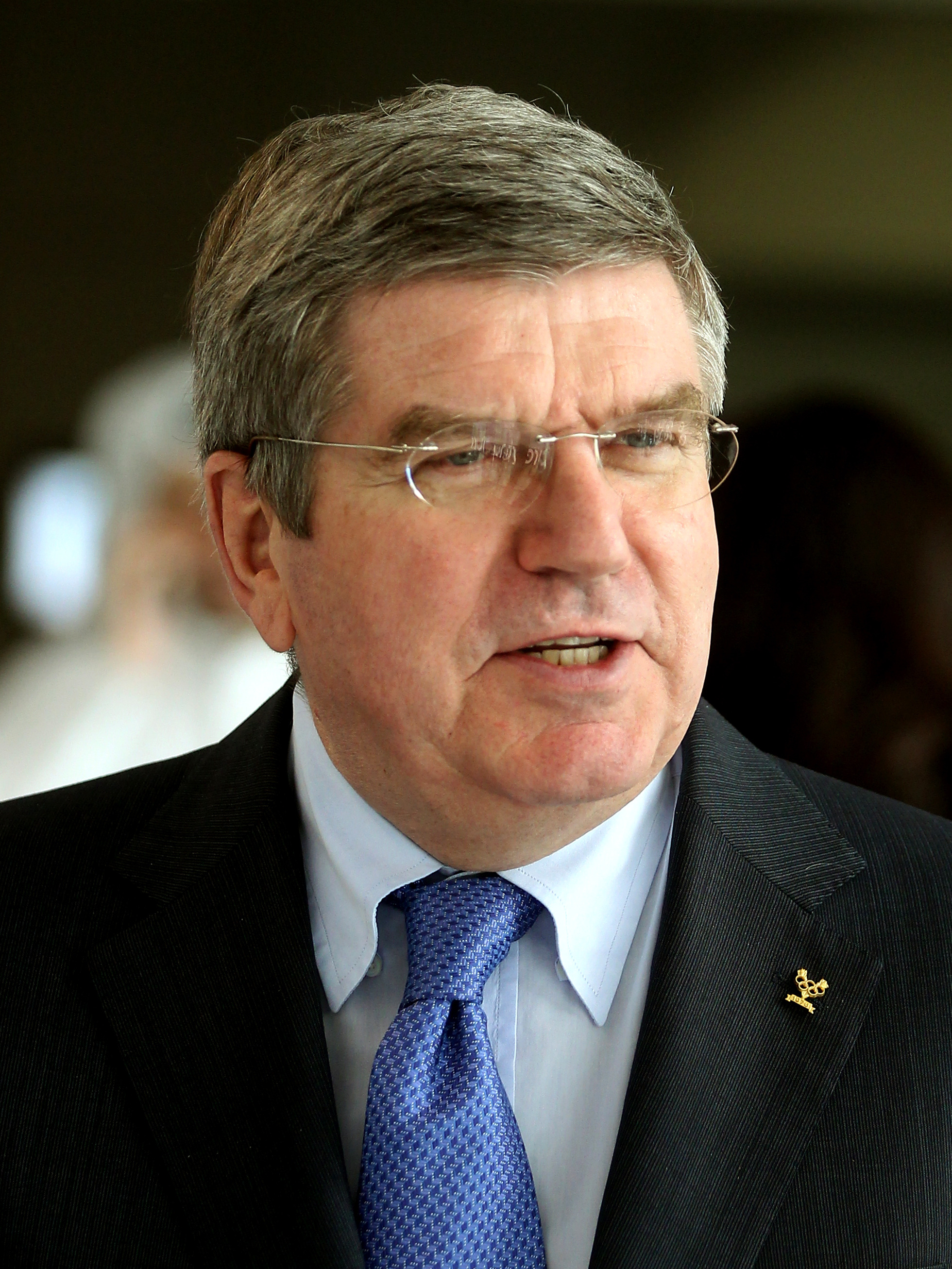
The president of the IOC, Thomas Bach, supported the request to suspend Valieva from further competition at the Olympics but accepted the CAS decision to allow her to compete due to the rule of law which he states is sacrosanct to preserving the integrity of sports at the Olympics.

In a press conference, the day after the free skate, IOC president Thomas Bach said he was "very, very disturbed" by the "chilling atmosphere" surrounding Valieva during the free skate as coach Tutberidze berated her following a mistake-filled performance that dropped her off the podium. Bach also insinuated that her coaches likely played a role in her positive test. President Vladimir Putin's spokesperson Dmitry Peskov called Bach's comments "deeply inappropriate", stating that "the harshness of a coach in high-level sport is key for their athletes to achieve victories."

IOC President Bach later added that "doping is very rarely done alone with the athletes" and that the "ones who have administered this drug in her body, these are the ones who are guilty." WADA also filed an interim brief indicating that Valieva's acknowledgment of taking the two permitted substances, Hypoxen and L-carnitine, could be read as undercutting her testimony that the banned substance, trimetazidine, was ingested by error. When the US team and the Japanese team announced their choices of athletes to compete at the March ISU World Championships in France, the Figure Skating Federation of Russia had not yet indicated their choice of which three women to send to France – at the time, Valieva remained eligible to compete – unless a negative outcome for doping was filed against her before the competition began. However, Valieva's eligibility has since been rescinded by the ISU, although for an unrelated reason, as all Russian and Belarusian skaters were banned due to the ongoing Russian invasion of Ukraine.

=== After Beijing Olympics ===
By 9 March 2022, Travis Tygart of the USADA reported that Valieva had not requested that her "B" sample be tested, apparently accepting the results of initial testing and relying on her explanation that the banned substance TMZ belonged to her grandfather and only accidentally contaminated or became mixed into her own use of allowed nutrients and supplements. Tygart further stated that as a minor, Valieva could still be either fully exculpated or given a warning concerning her testing positive, depending on the extent of findings in the ongoing RUSADA investigation of doping. According to Tygart, an adverse finding against her as a first offense could still be assessed as a two-year suspension, which is half of the suspension time which could be assessed for adults. On 17 March, WADA requested that RUSADA complete its report on Valieva and her entourage by 8 August 2022. On 7 June 2022, ISU regulation governing the minimum age for competition at figure skating events was raised from 15 to 17 years of age following the Valieva incident at the Beijing Olympics.

On 8 August, insidethegames wrote that the six-month report originally expected on 8 August would be allowed some extra time because further data was requested by RUSADA in July in order to complete its report stating that: "WADA President Witold Bańka recently told insidethegames that he expects a hearing will be held by RUSADA 'quite soon', and that the organization will 'monitor it'." On 15 September, Christine Brennan, writing for USA Today, indicated that RUSADA had completed their report and delivered it for evaluation and subsequent scheduling of official hearings concerning the investigation of Valieva's possible misconduct regarding the use of banned substances during competition. Brennan further quoted U.S. Anti-Doping CEO Travis Tygart stating that: "Given it appears that RUSADA's investigation is over and the case is now headed to court, they must have found sufficient evidence of a violation or otherwise the case would be closed, and WADA would be notified of its right to appeal." A disciplinary hearing reviewing the RUSADA investigation results is presently planned to take place in late September or early October. A decision by RUSADA was issued in mid-October, which was endorsed by WADA, stated that the details of the Valieva hearing and its scheduled dates would be placed under international guidelines for the protection of minors (Valieva was 15 years old when the positive test results were disclosed) and not to be disclosed publicly.

Evan Bates and Nathan Chen criticized the lack of transparency in the review of the Valieva case as creating an undue delay for the presentation of the Olympic medals, which were withheld for more than a year, as of March 2023, from being awarded to American and Japanese skaters until the results of the Valieva case are fully resolved to determine if Russia ought to keep the gold medal or be stripped of it. Although Russia as a country is currently banned from participating in international skating events due to the 2022 Russian invasion of Ukraine, Valieva has continued to compete within Russian borders without being hindered by RUSADA as recently as the Russian Grand Prix held in October 2022. In mid-November, WADA requested that CAS take up the review of the Valieva case with an eye towards a four-year suspension of Valieva, which would exclude her from competition at the next Winter Olympics, and to rescind her first place performance at the previous Beijing Olympics because "the Russian Anti-Doping Agency (RUSADA) did not meet a WADA-imposed Nov. 4 deadline to deliver a verdict on Valieva's case." On 13 January, Valieva was denied her gold medal in the senior women's singles event of the 2022 Russian Figure Skating Championships following a ruling by RUSADA stating that her positive drug test was coincident with the December 2021 competition, while her win for team Russia at the Beijing Olympics in February 2022 was endorsed as valid following her passing drug tests in Beijing; WADA has stated that it will continue to press its request for CAS to review RUSADA's decision concerning the positive drug test. In March 2023, Graham Dunbar writing for AP stated that CAS was in the process of selecting a 3-judge panel which should decide upon the question of either allowing or suspending Valieva from competition at the next Winter Olympics based on their investigation. On 22 June 2023, CAS announced that the hearing in the doping case was scheduled to take place 26–29 September 2023, and on 15 September 2023, it was announced that British lawyer James Drake would lead the CAS panel of arbitrators. Drake would be joined by American lawyer Jeffrey Mishkin who was selected by WADA and the ISU while French attorney Mathieu Maisonneuve had been nominated by Valieva.

=== 2024 disqualification by CAS and 2026 Winter Olympics ===
On 28 September 2023, CAS "ordered the production of further documentation" and announced that her hearing had been adjourned until 9–10 November. It appeared that one of the parties in the case requested a file that had not previously been a part of the proceedings. On 10 November, CAS announced that a final decision was expected by the end of January 2024. On 29 January 2024, the CAS disqualified Valieva for four years retroactive to 25 December 2021 for an anti-doping rule violation, as a result of the positive test for trimetazidine. On 30 January 2024, the ISU disqualified her from the 2022 European Championships and the 2022 Winter Olympics in compliance with the ruling, which in turn caused the stripping of her gold medal at the 2022 European Championships (with the gold, silver, and bronze medals reallocated to Shcherbakova, Trusova, and Loena Hendrickx respectively) and the reallocation of medals in the 2022 Winter Olympics team event to upgrade the United States to gold and Japan to silver while downgrading the Russian Olympic Committee to bronze. Although Valieva would technically be eligible for participation in the 2026 Winter Olympics following her four year suspension, the previous full-scale invasion by Russia of Ukraine in 2022 resulted in further sporting sanctions against Russia which remain in full effect as of February 2024, which would preclude her from participation in the 2026 Winter Olympics unless lifted sufficiently early.

In March 2023, the IOC published a statement stating that it supported the return of Russian and Belarusian athletes such as Valieva, as long as they did not "actively" support the war and as long as their flag, anthem, colors, and organizations were excluded (thus preventing them from competing under the Russian Olympic Committee as in Tokyo 2020 and Beijing 2022). The IOC additionally compared the situation to the Independent Olympic Participants at the 1992 Summer Olympics. The matter of the terms of the eligibility of Russian athletes at the 2024 Summer Olympics was reported by the Associated Press as allowing 15 Russian 'neutrals' to fully participate apparently allowing for the possibility for Valieva to participate at the 2026 Winter Olympics. By the time of the 2026 Winter Olympics, the Russian and Belarusian National Oympic Committees remained suspended for violating the Olympic Truce because of the 2022 Russian invasion of Ukraine. As with the 2024 Summer Olympics in Paris, athletes from Russia and Belarus could compete at the 2026 Games as independent Olympians without national identification, under the banner of "Individual Neutral Athletes" (AIN). The individual neutral athletes had to be approved by their sport's international federation, and then by an IOC panel. In the end, from Russia, only Adeliia Petrosian and Petr Gumennik were allowed to compete at the 2026 Winter Olympics, with Valieva not making the final list of competitors.

== Sanctions by Ukraine ==
In December 2022, the Ukrainian government issued personal sanctions against 56 athletes who the Ukrainian government accused of actively supporting the war in Ukraine and justifying the military invasion of Ukrainians. This list included Valieva.

== Significant technical achievements ==
On 23 August 2019, at the junior level of the Grand Prix in France, Valieva performed a quadruple toe loop with a positive grade of execution (GOE), which made her the second woman to perform this jump in the history of figure skating (after Trusova) at competitions under the auspices of the International Skating Union. On 18 October 2020, a video appeared on the Internet where she performed a triple Axel with complication in training with two hands up. On 5 December 2020, she cleanly performed the triple Axel in the short program at the stage of the Russian Cup in Moscow. On 12 February 2021, a video appeared on the Internet where Valieva performed a quadruple salchow in training with the Rippon arm extension technique.

== Awards ==
In February 2022, after the end of the Olympics, Valieva received the Order of Friendship from President Vladimir Putin.

On 18 March 2022 in Kazan, Tatarstan President Rustam Minnikhanov met and awarded her a "Duslyk" order and a medal of "100 years of the Establishment of Tatar ASSR" to her mother, Alsu Anvarovna Valieva.

== In other media ==
- Quad Loop (2023/24), a stage play on the doping scandal surrounding Kamila Valieva, was written/directed by Inge-Vera Lipsius and performed at The Merchant House (Amsterdam) in March/April 2023 and at the Pushkin House (Bloomsbury, London) in July 2024. The play is a textual montage that combines direct quotations with original writing to tell the story of Valieva through the eyes of the media; it was performed by a cast of young women actors.

== Programs ==
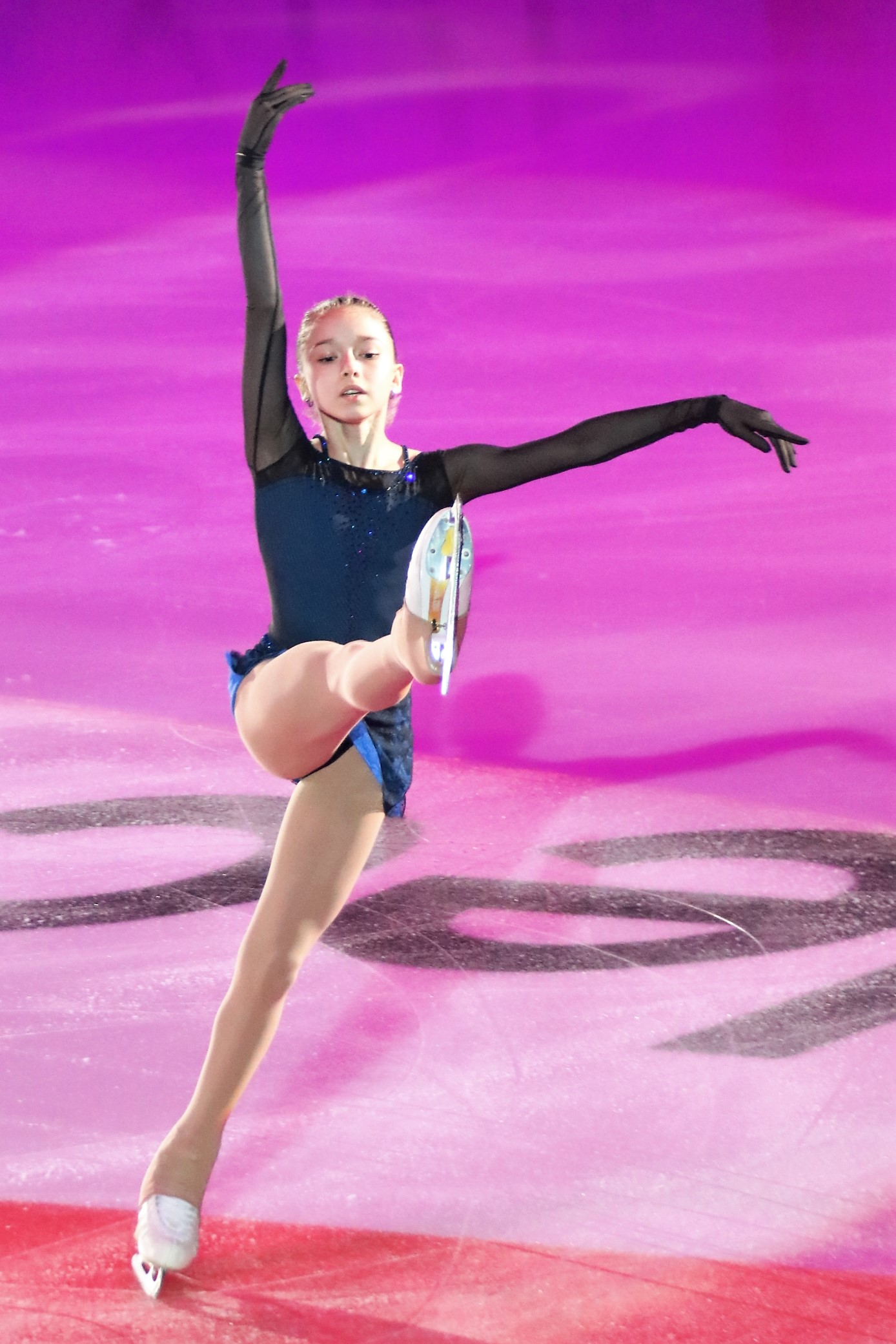
Valieva at the 2018 Rostelecom Cup gala

Season	Short program	Free skating	Exhibition
2026–2027	Mamma La Rondinella; Taranta by Ludovico Einaudi choreo. by Benoit Richaud	On The Nature of Daylight (from Hamnet) by Max Richter; True Love's Last Kiss by Eternal Eclipse choreo. by Benoit Richaud	
2025–2026	Расставание (Утомленное солнце) by Гетера choreo. by Nikita Mikhailov	–	Nureyev; (from "The White Crow"); Composed by Ilan Eshkeri, Lisa Batiashvili and Dudana Mazmanishvili
2024–2025	Did not compete this season		
2023–2024	I See Red by Everybody Loves An Outlaw choreo. by Daniil Gleikhengauz	Black Panther: Wakanda Forever: Wakanda by Ludwig Göransson; Lift Me Up by Rihanna; A King's Sunset by Ludwig Göransson; Never Forget by Sampa the Great choreo. by Daniil Gleikhengauz	Comet by Jony; Winter in the Heart by Moya Mishel; At Dawn by Alyans performed by Basta; Piyala by Aigel
2022–2023	Cornfield Chase by Hans Zimmer performed by Dorian Marko; Tick-Tock by Hans Zimmer (from Interstellar) choreo. by Daniil Gleikhengauz	Low Mist Variation 1 (Day 5) by Ludovico Einaudi; Truman Sleeps (from The Truman Show) by Philip Glass; Obscura by Power-Haus and Christian Reindl choreo. by Daniil Gleikhengauz	Wednesday Main Title by Danny Elfman; Goo Goo Muck by The Cramps; Bloody Mary by Lady Gaga
2021–2022	In Memoriam by Kirill Richter choreo. by Daniil Gleikhengauz	Boléro by Maurice Ravel choreo. by Daniil Gleikhengauz	Shutting Down Grace's Lab (from Avatar) by James Horner choreo. by Daniil Gleikhengauz
2020–2021	Storm by Eric Radford choreo. by Daniil Gleikhengauz	Boléro by Maurice Ravel choreo. by Daniil Gleikhengauz	Exogenesis: Symphony Part 3 by Muse choreo. by Daniil Gleikhengauz
2019–2020	Girl on a Ball: Spiegel im Spiegel by Arvo Pärt; Allerdale Hall (from Crimson Peak) by Fernando Velázquez choreo. by Eteri Tutberidze	Exogenesis: Symphony Part 3 by Muse choreo. by Daniil Gleikhengauz	Adagio of Spartacus and Phrygia (from Spartacus) by Aram Khachaturian choreo. by Daniil Gleikhengauz
2018–2019	Girl on a Ball: Spiegel im Spiegel by Arvo Pärt; Allerdale Hall (from Crimson Peak) by Fernando Velázquez choreo. by Eteri Tutberidze	Adagio of Spartacus and Phrygia (from Spartacus) by Aram Khachaturian choreo. by Daniil Gleikhengauz	Girl on a Ball: Spiegel im Spiegel by Arvo Pärt; Allerdale Hall (from Crimson Peak) by Fernando Velázquez choreo. by Eteri Tutberidze

== World records and achievements ==
- Became only the second woman to land a quad toe loop at the 2019 JGP France.
- Became the first woman ever to surpass the 170 and 180 point barriers in the free skate as well as 250, 260 and 270 point barrier in total.
- Set the junior record for the highest free skate score and total score at the 2020 Junior World Championships, surpassing the previous records in both categories set by her former training mate Alexandra Trusova. Her record scores were later surpassed by teammate Sofia Akateva in 2021.

== Competitive highlights ==
- GP – Event of the ISU Grand Prix Series
- JGP – Event of the ISU Junior Grand Prix Series
- CS – Event of the ISU Challenger Series
- DSQ – Result was annulled

Competition placements at senior level
Season	2020–21	2021–22	2022–23	2023–24
Winter Olympics		DSQ		
Winter Olympics (Team event)		DSQ		
European Championships		DSQ		
Russian Championships	2nd	DSQ	DSQ	DSQ
GP Rostelecom Cup		1st		
GP Skate Canada		1st		
CS Finlandia Trophy		1st		

Competition placements at junior level
Season	2019–20
World Junior Championships	1st
Junior Grand Prix Final	1st
Russian Championships	1st
JGP France	1st
JGP Russia	1st

== Detailed results ==
=== Senior level ===
Small medals for short and free programs awarded only at ISU Championships. Personal bests are italicized. Current world record scores are bold and italicized. Previous world records highlighted in bold.

**2025–26 season**
**Date**	**Event**	**SP**	**FS**	**Total**	**Details**
18–23 March 2026	2026 Channel One Trophy	4 70.09	–	1T	Details
**2023–24 season**
Date	Event	SP	FS	Total	Details
20-24 December 2023	2024 Russian Championships	DSQ; ~~81.85~~	DSQ; ~~156.14~~	DSQ; ~~237.99~~	Details
**2022–23 season**
Date	Event	SP	FS	Total	Details
20–25 December 2022	2023 Russian Championships	DSQ; ~~76.61~~	DSQ; ~~170.71~~	DSQ; ~~247.32~~	Details
**2021–22 season**
Date	Event	SP	FS	Total	Details
15–17 February 2022	2022 Winter Olympics	DSQ; ~~82.16~~	DSQ; ~~141.93~~	DSQ; ~~224.09~~	Details
4–7 February 2022	2022 Winter Olympics – Team event	DSQ; ~~90.18~~	DSQ; ~~178.92~~	DSQ; ~~269.10~~	Details
13–15 January 2022	2022 European Championships	DSQ; ~~**90.45**~~	DSQ; ~~168.61~~	DSQ; ~~259.06~~	Details
21–26 December 2021	2022 Russian Championships	~~1~~; 90.38	DSQ; ~~193.10~~	DSQ; 283.48	Details
26–28 November 2021	2021 Rostelecom Cup	1; **87.42**	1; **185.29**	1; **272.71**	Details
29–31 October 2021	2021 Skate Canada International	1; 84.19	1; **180.89**	1; **265.08**	Details
7–10 October 2021	2021 CS Finlandia Trophy	3; 74.93	1; **174.31**	1; **249.24**	Details

=== Junior level ===
Small medals for short and free programs awarded only at ISU Championships. Previous junior world record scores highlighted in bold.

**2020–21 season**
Date	Event	SP	FS	Total	Details
23–27 December 2020	2021 Russian Championships	2; 79.99	2; 174.02	2; 254.01	Details
2019–20 season
Date	Event	SP	FS	Total	Details
2–8 March 2020	2020 World Junior Championships	1; 74.92	1; **152.38**	1; **227.30**	Details
4–8 February 2020	2020 Russian Junior Championships	1; 78.50	1; 159.67	1; 238.17	Details
5–8 December 2019	2019–20 JGP Final	4; 69.02	1; 138.45	1; 207.47	Details
11–14 September 2019	2019 JGP Russia	1; 73.56	1; 148.39	1; 221.95	Details
21–24 August 2019	2019 JGP France	3; 62.31	1; 138.40	1; 200.71	Details
