= Fatty acid oxidation inhibitors =

Fatty acid oxidation inhibitors are a new potent class of drugs used in treatment of stable angina pectoris and an addition in treatment of chronic heart failure.

== Drugs ==
- CPT-I inhibitors: etomoxir, oxfenicine, perhexiline
  CPT-I (carnitine palmitoyl transferase) converts fatty acyl-CoA to fatty acyl-carnitine.
- Carnitine biosynthesis inhibitor: mildronate
- 3-KAT inhibitors: trimetazidine
  3-KAT (3-ketoacyl-coenzyme A thiolase) inhibitors directly inhibits fatty acid beta-oxidation.
- pFOX directly inhibits fatty acid beta-oxidation.
