= Travis Tygart =

American lawyer

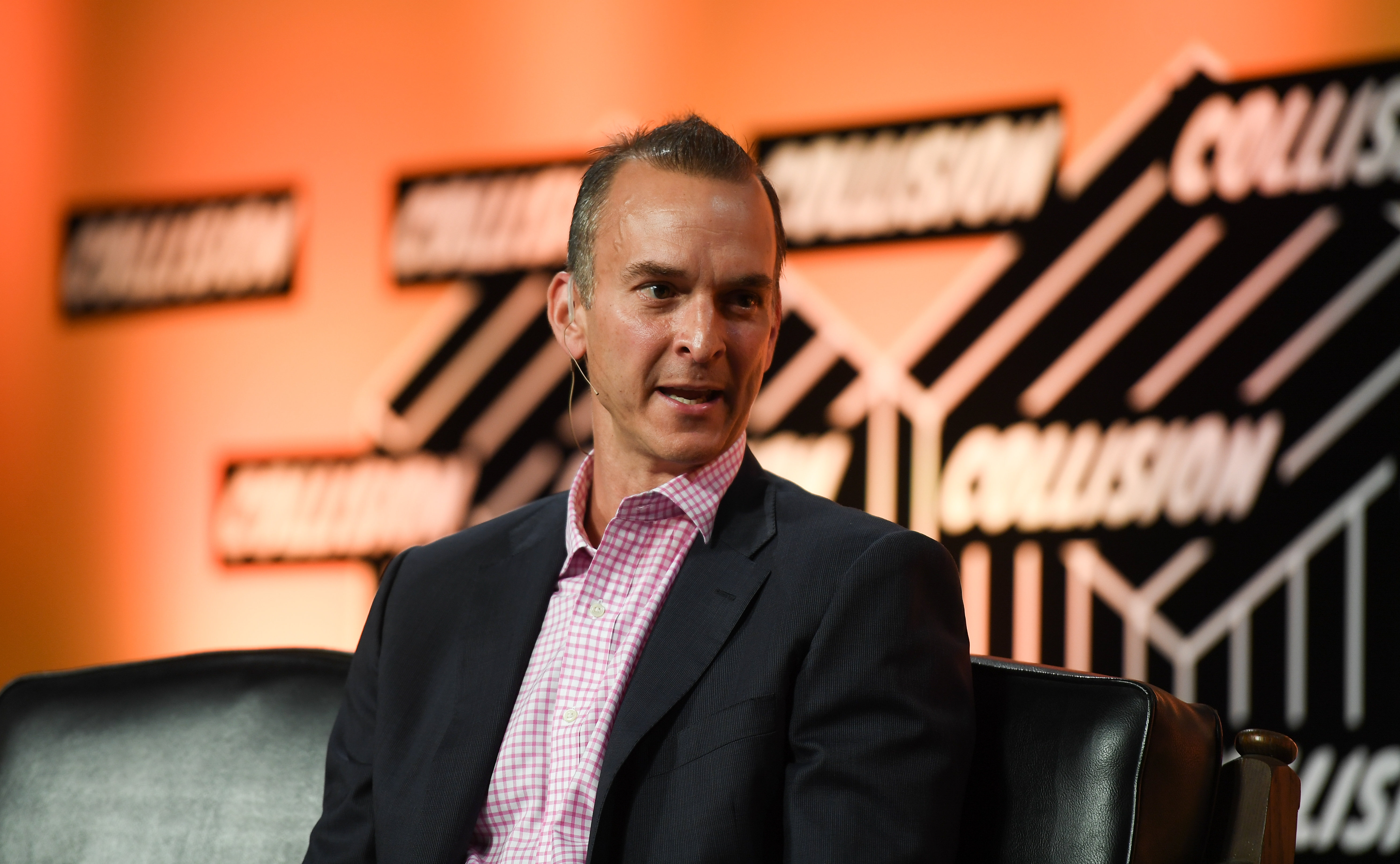
- Tygart in 2017
- Born: Travis Thompson Tygart; 1971 (age 54–55); Jacksonville, Florida, U.S.
- Education: University of North Carolina, Chapel Hill (BA); Southern Methodist University (JD)
- Organization: United States Anti-Doping Agency
- Known for: Exposing the Lance Armstrong doping operation

Travis Thompson Tygart (born 1971) is an American lawyer and CEO of the United States Anti-Doping Agency (USADA). He is best known for his role in exposing Lance Armstrong's massive doping operation.

== Life and career ==
A native of Jacksonville, Florida, he attended the Bolles School, He starred on the baseball and basketball teams; on the former, one of his teammates was future Atlanta Braves star Chipper Jones. He graduated from the University of North Carolina at Chapel Hill with a bachelor's degree in philosophy, and in 2010 received the University's Distinguished Young Alumni Award. Tygart went on to get his J.D. from Southern Methodist University in 1999, graduating Order of the Coif.

Prior to joining USADA, Tygart was an athlete and associate in the sports law practice at Holme Roberts & Owen LLP (HRO). While at HRO, Tygart worked with individual athletes and the United States Olympic Committee, USA Basketball, USA Swimming, USA Volleyball, and the Pro Rodeo Cowboys' Association. Tygart is on the board of advisors of the Taylor Hooton Foundation.

Tygart became Chief Executive Officer of USADA in September 2007. He originally joined the agency in October 2002 as director of legal affairs, later becoming senior managing director and general counsel. He has also prosecuted cases before the American Arbitration Association and the Court of Arbitration for Sport on behalf of USADA.

== Role in Armstrong doping case ==
Tygart had harbored suspicions about Armstrong for most of his tenure at USADA. A number of former members of Armstrong's U.S. Postal Service Pro Cycling Team had been caught doping. Having learned about the doping that then ran rampant in the sport, Tygart found it hard to believe that Armstrong was clean.

In June 2012, USADA accused Armstrong of doping, a charge that Armstrong ceased trying to defend in August 2012. As a result, he was stripped of all results from August 1, 1998, onward–including his seven consecutive Tour titles–and banned for life from all sports whose federations followed the World Anti-Doping Code. The latter sanction had the effect of ending his competitive career. Armstrong filed a suit in U.S. District Court against Tygart and USADA. When dismissing the lawsuit against 'Defendant Travis Tygart and United States Anti-Doping Agency (collectively, "USADA")', U.S. District Judge Sam Sparks wrote, "USADA's conduct raises serious questions about whether its real interest in charging Armstrong is to combat doping, or if it is acting according to less noble motives." Tygart was previously involved in the investigation of Floyd Landis. Tygart stated in an interview with French newspaper L'Équipe that he had received three death threats since the beginning of the Armstrong investigation and that security had been tightened around him by the FBI.

After USADA announced that it would strip Armstrong of all his results obtained after August 1, 1998, Tygart stated in an interview with VeloNation: "He [Armstrong] knows all the evidence as well and he knows the truth, and so the smarter move on his part is to attempt to hide behind baseless accusations of process."

== U.S. Helsinki Commission testimony ==
In July 2018, Tygart testified before the U.S. Helsinki Commission in Washington, DC on the subject of doping in sports. He was on a panel alongside Jim Walden, the attorney for Russian Whistle-blower Dr. Grigory Rodchenkov, Yuliya Stepanova, a former Russian track star turned whistleblower, and Katie Uhlaender, a four-time member of the U.S. Skeleton team. Tygart submitted eight pages of testimony and told the Commission he would continue attempting to persuade Congress to address international doping.

== 2022 Russian doping controversy ==
On March 9, 2022, Tygart reported that Russian figure skater Kamila Valieva, who was reported for doping violation at the 2022 Olympics, had not requested that her "B" sample be tested, apparently accepting the results of initial testing and relying on her explanation that the banned substance TMZ belonged to her grandfather and only accidentally contaminated or became mixed into her own use of allowed nutrients and supplements. Tygart further stated that as a minor Valieva could still be either fully exculpated or given a warning concerning her testing positive depending on the extent of findings in the on-going RUSADA investigation of doping. According to Tygart, an adverse finding against her as a first offense could still be assessed as a two year suspension, which is half of the suspension time which could be assessed for adults.

== WADA controversy ==
In 2024 Tygart was engaged in a drawn-out dispute with the World Anti-Doping Agency (WADA) due to various doping allegations and their investigation.

== In other media ==
- In the 2015 film The Program, he is portrayed by actor John Schwab.
