= Trimetazidine =

Drug for angina pectoris sold under many brand names

Clinical data
- Trade names: Angintriz
- AHFS/Drugs.com: International Drug Names
- Routes of administration: Oral
- ATC code: C01EB15 (WHO)

Legal status
- Legal status: UK: Controlled Drug

Pharmacokinetic data
- Bioavailability: completely absorbed at around 5 hours, steady state is reached by 60th hour
- Protein binding: low (16%)
- Metabolism: minimal
- Elimination half-life: 7 to 12 hours
- Excretion: mainly renal (unchanged), exposure is increased in renal impairment – on average by four-fold in subjects with severe renal impairment (CrCl <30 ml/min)

Identifiers
- IUPAC name: 1-(2,3,4-trimethoxybenzyl)piperazine
- CAS Number: 5011-34-7
- PubChem CID: 21109
- ChemSpider: 19853
- UNII: N9A0A0R9S8
- ChEMBL: ChEMBL203266
- CompTox Dashboard (EPA): DTXSID2048531
- ECHA InfoCard: 100.023.355

Chemical and physical data
- Formula: C_{14}H_{22}N_{2}O_{3}
- Molar mass: 266.341 g·mol^{−1}
- 3D model (JSmol): Interactive image
- SMILES: O(c1ccc(c(OC)c1OC)CN2CCNCC2)C
- InChI: InChI=1S/C14H22N2O3/c1-17-12-5-4-11(13(18-2)14(12)19-3)10-16-8-6-15-7-9-16/h4-5,15H,6-10H2,1-3H3; Key:UHWVSEOVJBQKBE-UHFFFAOYSA-N

Trimetazidine (IUPAC: 1-(2,3,4-trimethoxybenzyl)piperazine) is a drug used in the treatment of angina pectoris, a condition characterized by chest pain due to reduced blood flow to the heart. Developed and first marketed by Laboratoires Servier (France), it is described as the first cytoprotective anti-ischemic agent. Trimetazidine is an antianginal metabolic drug of the fatty acid oxidation inhibitor class; it shifts cardiac energy metabolism from fatty acid utilization toward glucose oxidation, thereby improving the efficiency of energy production in ischemic conditions.

The drug has also become controversial as a performance-enhancing drug, with multiple doping scandals linked to its use at successive Olympic Games.

== Medical uses ==
Trimetazidine is prescribed primarily as a long-term treatment for angina pectoris. In some countries, including France, it has also been used for tinnitus and dizziness. The drug is typically administered twice daily. In 2012, the European Medicines Agency (EMA) completed a review of its benefits and risks and recommended restricting trimetazidine-containing medicines to use only as an add-on therapy for angina pectoris when first-line antianginal agents are insufficient or not tolerated.

Controlled studies in patients with angina have shown that trimetazidine increases coronary flow reserve, delays the onset of exercise-induced ischemia, stabilizes blood pressure without significantly affecting heart rate, reduces the frequency of angina attacks, and decreases the need for symptomatic nitrate use.

Trimetazidine has also been reported to improve left ventricular function in patients with coronary heart disease and diabetes.

As of 2023, it is under investigation for the treatment of bipolar depression.

Testing to determine if it can have a positive impact on patients suffering from ALS/MND is due to begin taking place in 2026.

== Use as a performance-enhancing drug ==
Although developed for medical use in the 1970s, trimetazidine was only added to the World Anti-Doping Agency (WADA) list of prohibited substances in 2014 under the category of "hormone and metabolic modulators." Its use is prohibited at all times, both in and out of competition.

In 2014, Chinese Olympic swimmer Sun Yang tested positive for trimetazidine, four months after it had been added to the banned list. He was suspended for three months by the Chinese Swimming Association. Later that year, WADA reclassified trimetazidine from a "stimulant" to a "modulator of cardiac metabolism."

In 2018, U.S. swimmer Madisyn Cox tested positive for trimetazidine and was initially suspended for two years. Testing later confirmed contamination of her multivitamins, and the Court of Arbitration for Sport reduced her suspension to six months, which expired in September 2018.

In 2021, 23 Chinese swimmers tested positive for trimetazidine in cases reported to WADA by the China Anti-Doping Agency. Following review in June and July 2021, WADA concluded that the threshold to open an investigation had not been met. The United States Anti-Doping Agency (USADA) had raised concerns in 2020 and again in 2023 about possible cover-ups, but these allegations were deemed unsubstantiated.

In February 2022, the medal ceremony for the Olympic figure skating team event, scheduled for 8 February, was delayed after what International Olympic Committee (IOC) spokesperson Mark Adams described as a matter requiring "legal consultation" with the International Skating Union (ISU). Media reports later revealed the issue concerned a positive December 2021 test for trimetazidine by Russian skater Kamila Valieva, which was publicly disclosed on 11 February. Valieva was cleared by the Russian Anti-Doping Agency (RUSADA) on 9 February, but the IOC, WADA, and ISU appealed the decision. On 14 February, the Court of Arbitration for Sport ruled that Valieva could compete in the women's singles, citing her age and the potential for "irreparable harm," though her team-event gold medal remained under review. The IOC confirmed that the medal ceremony would not take place until the investigation concluded. Besides trimetazidine, Valieva declared using hypoxen and L-carnitine, neither of which is banned. However, experts noted that the combination with trimetazidine could indicate an attempt to enhance endurance and reduce fatigue.

Lawrence Cherono, winner of several major marathons, tested positive for trimetazidine and was suspended one day before the 2022 World Athletics Championships.

In September 2024, Iga Świątek, then the world's top-ranked women's tennis player, tested positive for trimetazidine and received a one-month provisional suspension after accepting a ruling of "No Significant Fault or Negligence," linked to a contaminated melatonin supplement. WADA later announced it would not pursue the case further, describing the explanation as "plausible".

=== Scientific criticism ===
Popular Science published an overview of scientific research about the potential for the use of trimetazidine as a performance enhancing drug for athletes. The author of the article concluded in its headline that "there's no hard proof that it would improve a figure skater's performance". Scott Powers, a physiologist at the University of Florida who studies the effects of exercise on the heart explained how trimetazidine was included in WADA list. "I've been involved in roundtables with the International Olympic Committee, and I think their policy is: When in doubt, ban the drug," says Scott Powers. "I guess they're just trying to err on the possibility that this drug may be an ergogenic aid." Doping expert Klaas Faber referred to "grossly inconsistent anti-doping rules" in Sun Yang's case. Faber has pointed out for years the necessity to establish thresholds for trimetazidine detected so as to avoid any inadvertent positive doping cases. Faber has detailed some of these observations published in the journal Science & Justice.

On the efficacy of the drug on figure skating and Valieva in particular, heart expert Benjamin J. Levine, a professor of exercise science at the University of Texas Southwestern Medical School, said "The chance that trimetazidine would improve her performance, in my opinion, is zero. The heart has plenty of blood. And the heart is so good at using different fuels."

Aaron Baggish, director of the Cardiovascular Performance Program at Massachusetts General Hospital said "In theory, trimetazidine could aid endurance athletes who have to generate high cardiac output, such as cyclists, rowers and long-distance runners, but would be unlikely to have a direct impact on a figure skater's performance, where there is less demand on the heart."

== Adverse effects ==
Trimetazidine has been treated as a drug with a high safety and tolerability profile.

Information is scarce about trimetazidine's effect on mortality, cardiovascular events, or quality of life. Long-term randomized, controlled trials comparing trimetazidine against standard antianginal agents using clinically important outcomes would be justifiable. A 2013 international multicentre retrospective cohort study has indeed shown that in patients with heart failure of different etiologies the addition of trimetazidine on conventional optimal therapy can improve mortality and morbidity.

The EMA recommends that doctors no longer prescribe trimetazidine for the treatment of patients with tinnitus, vertigo, or disturbances in vision. The recent EMA evaluation also revealed rare cases (3.6/1,000,000 patient years) of parkinsonian (or extrapyramidal) symptoms (such as tremor, rigidity, akinesia, hypertonia), gait instability, restless leg syndrome, and other related movement disorders; most patients recovered within 4 months after treatment discontinuation, so doctors are advised not to prescribe the medicine either to patients with Parkinson disease, parkinsonian symptoms, tremors, restless leg syndrome, or other related movement disorders, or to patients with severe renal impairment. Parkinson's-like symptoms may increase the risk for falls, as it was observed in a case-control study.

== Mechanism of action ==
Trimetazidine acts by modulating cellular energy metabolism, particularly the balance between fatty acid and glucose oxidation.

Under normal conditions, cells generate ATP (adenosine triphosphate), the primary energy currency, by oxidizing both fatty acids and glucose. However, during ischemia (reduced blood flow) or hypoxia (reduced oxygen supply), oxygen availability is limited, and fatty acid oxidation becomes inefficient, leading to reduced ATP production and impaired cellular function.

Trimetazidine selectively inhibits the mitochondrial enzyme long-chain 3-ketoacyl-CoA thiolase, a key catalyst in the beta-oxidation of fatty acids. Inhibition of this enzyme decreases fatty acid oxidation and shifts substrate utilization toward glucose oxidation. Because glucose oxidation consumes less oxygen per molecule of ATP produced than fatty acid oxidation, this metabolic shift improves the efficiency of ATP generation under oxygen-limited conditions.

By preserving intracellular ATP levels, trimetazidine supports energy-dependent processes such as ionic pump activity and the maintenance of transmembrane sodium–potassium gradients. This stabilization of cellular homeostasis helps protect cardiac cells during ischemic stress.

== See also ==
- Isomescaline
