= Etomoxir =

Names
- IUPAC name rac-Ethyl 2-[6-(4-chlorophenoxy)hexyl]oxirane-2-carboxylate

Identifiers
CAS Number	124083-20-1
3D model (JSmol)	Interactive image
ChEMBL	ChEMBL2051959
ChemSpider	8016042
ECHA InfoCard	100.225.462
PubChem CID	9840324
UNII	MSB3DD2XP6
CompTox Dashboard (EPA)	DTXSID60869695 DTXSID40720952, DTXSID60869695
- InChI: InChI=1S/C17H23ClO4/c1-2-20-16(19)17(13-22-17)11-5-3-4-6-12-21-15-9-7-14(18)8-10-15/h7-10H,2-6,11-13H2,1H3/t17-/m1/s1 Key: DZLOHEOHWICNIL-QGZVFWFLSA-N; InChI=1/C17H23ClO4/c1-2-20-16(19)17(13-22-17)11-5-3-4-6-12-21-15-9-7-14(18)8-10-15/h7-10H,2-6,11-13H2,1H3/t17-/m1/s1 Key: DZLOHEOHWICNIL-QGZVFWFLBM
- SMILES: CCOC(=O)[C@]1(CO1)CCCCCCOC2=CC=C(C=C2)Cl

Properties
Chemical formula	C_{17}H_{23}ClO_{4}
Molar mass	326.82 g·mol^{−1}
Melting point	311 K
- Except where otherwise noted, data are given for materials in their standard state (at 25 °C [77 °F], 100 kPa). Infobox references

Etomoxir, or rac-Ethyl 2-[6-(4-chlorophenoxy)hexyl]oxirane-2-carboxylate, in the form of the dextrorotatory (R)-(+)- enantiomer, is an irreversible inhibitor of carnitine palmitoyltransferase-1 (CPT-1; EC 2.3.1.21) on the inner face of the outer mitochondrial membrane. The biologically active inhibitor – (R)-(+)-etomoxir-Coenzyme A ester – is formed through an intracellular process. The mean concentration for the inhibition of the CPT-1 in the liver, heart, and muscle mitochondria of rats is 20 micromolar/kilogram rac-Etomoxir. (+)-Etomoxir is a colourless solid with a melting point of 38 °C (311 K). The sodium salt of (+)-Etomoxir is water-soluble. The (S)-(-)-enantiomer of Etomoxir does not block CPT-1.

Etomoxir's mechanism prevents the formation of acyl carnitines, a step that is necessary for the transport of fatty acyl chains from the cytosol into the intermembrane space of the mitochondria. This step is essential to the production of ATP from fatty acid oxidation. Etomoxir has also been identified as a direct agonist of PPARα, causing cell cycle arrest in cancer cells. At higher concentrations of the drug, off-target effects have been demonstrated on Coenzyme-A (CoA) metabolism and on Complex I of the electron transport chain.

The influence of Etomoxir on food uptake is a matter of discussion, as contradictory findings have been reported.

== Clinical development ==
The primary effect of Etomoxir in vivo is a decrease in ketone bodies in the blood, followed by a decrease in blood glucose levels. These pharmacodynamic effects of (+)-Etomoxir can be explained by its mechanism and as a consequence of the inhibition of long-chain fatty acid oxidation. This results in disinhibition of the pyruvate dehydrogenase and an activation of glucose oxidation in the muscle. In 1980, this prompted German firm Byk Gulden Lomberg Chemische Fabrik GmbH – the patent owner – to initiate drug development for the treatment of type 2 diabetes. The company identified a mild anti-diabetic effect and a good safety profile with exception of few cases of transient increases in liver transaminase levels. The most promising effect found was the lowering of triglyceride levels in blood.

By 1999, the inventor had granted a license to MediGene AG (Martinsried, Germany) for further development as a drug against congestive heart failure and hyperlipidemia. Etomoxir entered its first clinical trial for patients with congestive heart failure, with results published in 2000. Throughout the following years, it was found that Etomoxir has beneficial effects either in isolated perfused rat hearts or in vivo in animals and humans.

Phase II clinical research started in 2001, with a double-blind, randomized multicentre clinical trial to evaluate the efficacy and safety of two doses of etomoxir in comparison with placebo in patients with congestive heart failure. This was called the ERGO (etomoxir for the recovery of glucose oxidation) study. In 2002, MediGene AG announced that it had terminated this trial due to adverse side effects, i.e., unacceptable high liver transaminase levels in 4 of 226 patients treated with the drug. The 2007 publication of the study, however, indicates the effects were reversible and statistical evaluation showed there were no significant differences between the placebo and treatment groups. The published study also reported that fewer patients died in the drug treatment group than in the placebo group, with 3/121 patients (2.5%) dying in the placebo group, 1/118 patients (0.8%) dying in the 40 mg etomoxir treatment group and 1/108 (0.9%) dying in the 80 mg treatment group. The deaths were all due to cardiac events in these patients with congestive heart failure.

== Further developments ==
Throughout the late 2000s, and 2010s, experimental evidence has accumulated indicating a broad spectrum of biological effects of Etomoxir. Among the reported effects are reduced disease progression in multiple sclerosis, a reversal of autoimmune encephalitis, and resistance to onset of Parkinson's disease. In addition, etomoxir inhibits tumor growth in animal models of breast cancer, prostate cancer, ovarian cancer, bladder cancer, and brain cancer. These anti-cancer effects of etomoxir are not only due to mechanisms within the cancer cells themselves, but also due to a reduction of tumor-associated macrophages in the pro-inflammatory tumor microenvironment.

The University of Colorado filed a patent in 2005 to use a combination of Etomoxir and an inhibitor of glycolysis as an anti-inflammatory and anti-carcinogenic agent, but this patent has since expired. Numiera Therapeutics, a US based pharmaceutical company, announced in 2025 that they secured orphan drug designation on etomoxir for treating malignant glioma, and that they are planning clinical trials in neuro oncology.
