= Sodium polydihydroxyphenylene thiosulfonate =

Chemical compound

Hypoxen
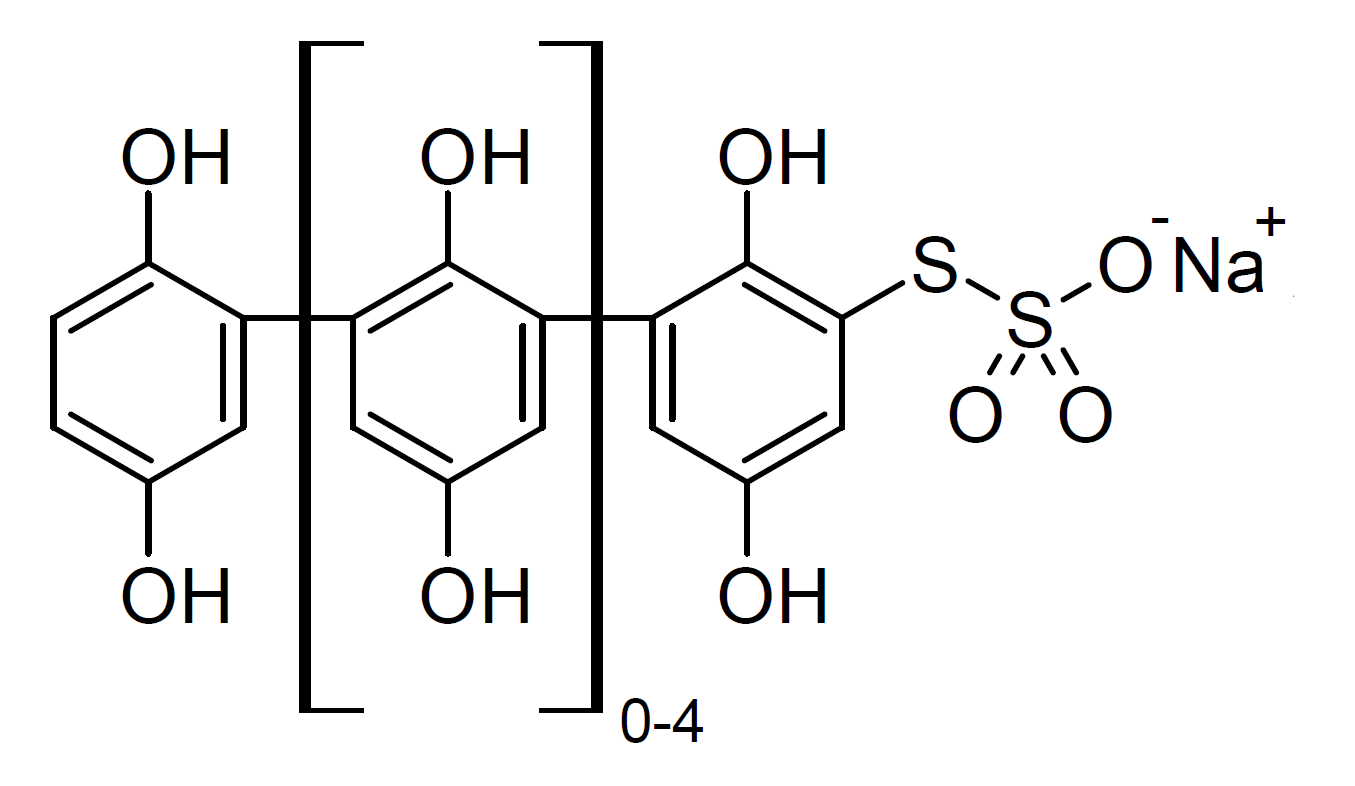

Identifiers
- IUPAC name: Sodium polydihydroxyphenylene thiosulfonate
- CAS Number: 148465-31-0
- UNII: XB8P57NK5T

Chemical and physical data
- Formula: C_{12+6n}H_{9+4n}NaO_{7+2n}S_{2}

Sodium polydihydroxyphenylene thiosulfonate (гипоксен, Hypoxen) is under laboratory studies in Russia as a potential regulator of cell metabolism.

It is registered in Russia as an antihypoxic agent, but has not been subjected to any clinical trials meeting internationally accepted standards, and has no regulatory approval as a prescription drug outside Russia and some former Soviet states.

It has been identified in tests on athletes in competition, such as Kamila Valieva, a Russian figure-skater competing at the 2022 Winter Olympics, but is not itself banned in international competitions, as of 2022.

== Potential abuse in sports ==
Although called an "oxygen booster" in public media to imply its potential to "increase endurance and reduce fatigue", there is no scientific evidence it has this property, and it is not used in conventional cardiology as a therapy for treating heart disease.

Hypoxen is sold online without a prescription, mainly from Russian websites, and does not appear to be sold in health stores in the United States. Hypoxen is not listed on the prohibited substance list of the World Anti-Doping Agency. In 2017, the United States Anti-Doping Agency applied to have hypoxen banned from athletic competitions, but the ban was not implemented.

== See also ==
- Meldonium
- Trimetazidine
- List of Russian drugs
