= Russian Jumping Championship =

Russian Jumping Championship Чемпионат России по прыжкам
- Status: Active
- Genre: Domestic competition
- Country: Russia
- Organiser: Figure Skating Federation of Russia

The Russian Jumping Championship (Russian: Чемпионат России по прыжкам) is an annual all-Russian figure skating competition organized by the Figure Skating Federation of Russia (Russian: Федерация фигурного катания России).

Athletes compete against each other by completing a series of jumps against each other individually, as well as duos.

== Participants ==
Athletes are invited and selected from the event organisers. The starting order of competitors are determined by a draw. The organisers reserve the right to change or re-clarify the rules prior to the competition draw. Winners of each event segment earn prize money.

== Rules ==
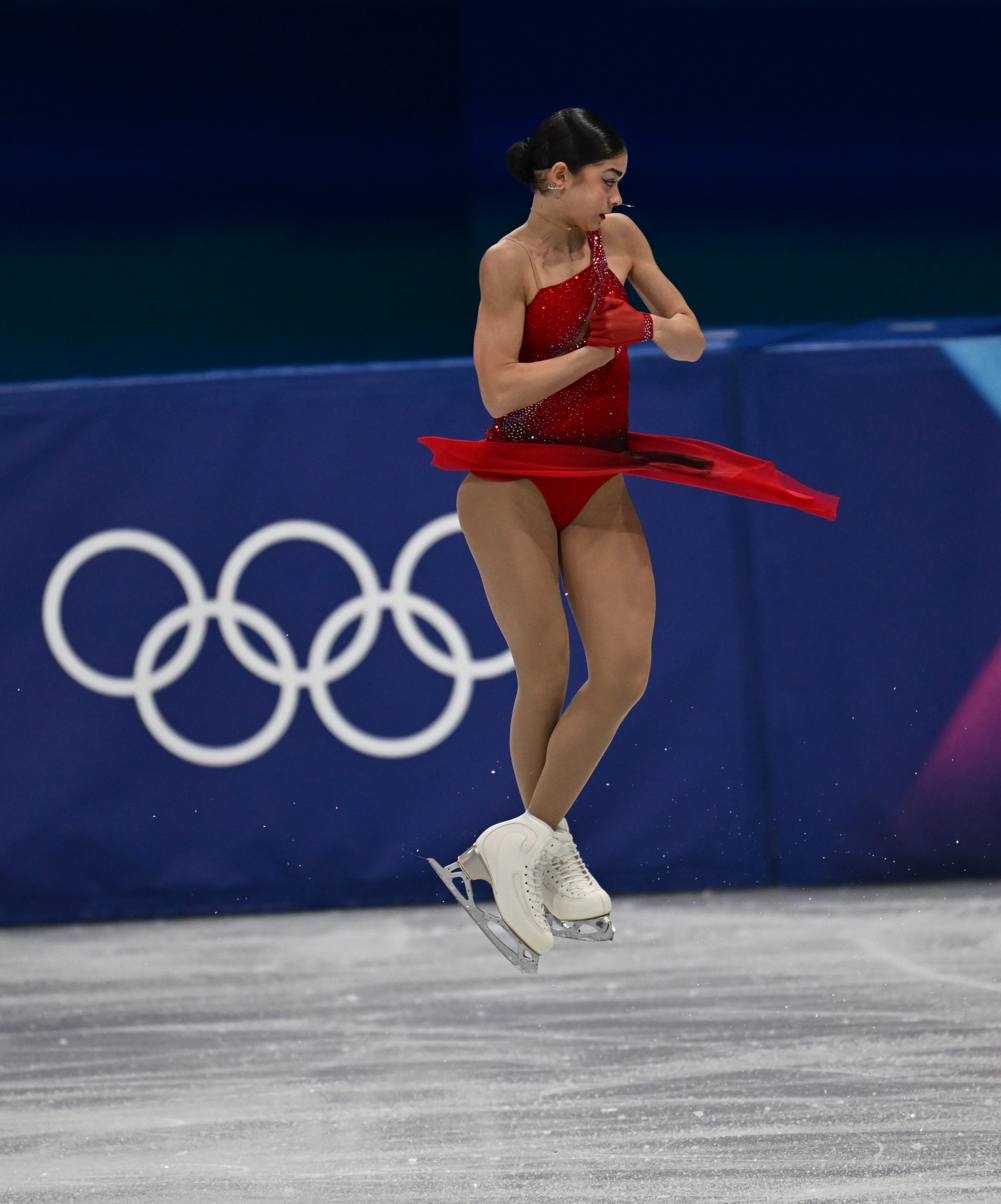
Adeliia Petrosian performing a quadruple jump.

=== Solo event ===
The individual events are held in women's singles, men's singles and pair skating. Each round, skaters perform a set of jump elements. Skaters are given freedom as to which types of jumps they chose to perform. All of the jump elements are scored based on the ISU judging system. The Euler jump is not taken into account of and has no value in points. Individuals scores are calculated and totalled throughout the competition. On the completion of each round, skaters with the lowest scores are eliminated, whereas skaters with the highest scores advance to the subsequent round. A countdown is started after the skaters name is announced. Skaters aim to complete as many jumps as possible in the allowed time. In case of a tie of points between 2 or more athletes, a "jump-off" is held. Athletes perform any other combination or sequence of no more than two jumps. The athlete who scores a higher amount of points for the combination or sequence takes the higher place in the final result of scores.

==== Singles skaters jump regulations ====
The Euler jump is not included as a valid jumping pass
Round	Elements	No. of attempts	Time allowed	No. of skaters who advance to the next round
1/4 Finals Quarter finals	Two different solo jumps.; One combination or sequence of no more than two jumps.	No more than two attempts for each element.	1 minute and 15 seconds	6
1/2 Finals Semi-finals	One solo jump.; One combination/sequence of no more than two jumps.; One combination/sequence of no more than three jumps.; The solo jump and the first jump of one of the combinations/sequences must not be repeated and be different.	No more than two attempts for each element.	1 minute and 30 seconds	3
Finals	Two solo jumps; One combination/sequence of no more than two jumps.; One combination/sequence of no more than five jumps.; The solo jump and the first jump of one of the combinations/sequences must not be repeated and be different.	No more than two attempts for each element.	2 minutes	

==== Pairs skating jump regulations ====
The Euler jump is not included as a valid jumping pass
Round	Elements	No. of attempts	Time allowed	No. of skaters who advance to the next round
1/2 Finals Semi-finals	One twist.; One combination/sequence of no more than two jumps.; One throw.	No more than one attempt is allowed for each element, with the exception of quad elements for which two attempts are allowed.	1 minute 30 seconds (30 seconds for an additional attempt)	3
Final	One twist.; One combination/sequence of no more than three jumps.; Two different throws.	No more than one attempt is allowed for each element, with the exception of quad elements for which two attempts are allowed.	1 minute 45 seconds (30 seconds for an additional attempt)	

=== Duos ===
The duos event is an event held for singles skaters where one female and one male skater pair together to earn points as a team. Each skater must have previously competed in the individual round. A total of six duos take part in the competition segment. There are a total of three rounds, each round has a different set of rules and elements the skaters must complete. All of the jump elements are scored based on the ISU judging system. The Euler jump is not taken into account of and has no value in points. Before round one, skaters go in order based on the draw. In rounds 2 and 3, skaters perform in reverse order from their original placement. Duos points are continuously counted. The duo with the most points by the end of round 3 wins.

The Euler jump is not included as a valid jumping pass
Round	Elements	Time allowed
Solo and combination jumps	Each skater in a duo performs two solo jumps.; All four jumps must be different, two of them must be triple, and the other two must be quadruple.; Each skater in a duo performs one combination/sequence of two jumps.; A duo may perform no more than one sequence.	2 minutes 30 second (1 minute 15 seconds for each skater in a duo)
Side-by-side solo jumps	Two different side-by-side solo jumps.	1 minute
Side-by-side combination jumps	Side-by-side combination/sequence of no more than two jumps.; SIde-by-side combination/sequence of no more than five jumps.; A duo may perform no more than one sequence.The first jumps of combos or sequence must be different.	1 minutes and 15 seconds
