= Hamnet (soundtrack) =

Hamnet (Original Motion Picture Soundtrack)

Film score by Max Richter
- Released: 26 November 2025
- Recorded: 2024–2025
- Studio: Studio Richter Mahr, Oxfordshire, England
- Genre: Film score
- Length: 67:03
- Label: Decca
- Producer: Max Richter

Max Richter chronology
Spaceman (2024)	Hamnet (2025)

Hamnet (Original Motion Picture Soundtrack) is the film score to the 2025 film Hamnet directed by Chloé Zhao starring Jessie Buckley, Paul Mescal, Emily Watson and Joe Alwyn. The film score is composed by Max Richter and released through Decca Records on 26 November 2025.

== Development ==
Max Richter composed the film's musical score. Richter added that he and Zhao share similar approaches with the film and music, complimenting her integration of music in Nomadland (2020) and liking the particular approach, where silence accompanied much of the film and music sporadically appear at certain instances. After discussing with Zhao and reading the script, Richter composed about 30 minutes of music which Zhao played on set helping in bringing the actors in tune with the score, even before it was formally composed during editing.

The goal was to create music which was transparent to the material. Since he was also present during the production, Richter felt he was able to see the actors at all times, to feel and see the story, adding the project is a possibility of getting closer to the emotions, as it was an emotional story about family, love, loss and death, but also the story of the relationship with the bigger world, nature and the cosmic questions and wanted to contain all of these things within the music.

While composing the score, he used the basic elements of Elizabethan music—"period instrumentation, grammar, and sensibility"—which he applied in a way that directly emerged from the psychology. As Agnes being the film's fulcrum, he developed a choral language for her that unravels the story. The female choir was used in ways an Elizabethan composer would recognize as well as purely for psychological and emotional color.

Richter composed a new piece of music for the final scene at the Globe Theatre. However, Zhao eventually replaced it with his well-known earlier piece "On the Nature of Daylight", which she had played on set while filming the sequence and had decided to be an ideal fit. Richter's original piece is instead heard in the end credits. "On the Nature of Daylight" was written in 2004 for Richter's studio album The Blue Notebooks (2004), and had previously been used in Stranger than Fiction (2006), Shutter Island (2010), Arrival (2016), and The Trip to Greece (2020) as well the television series The Handmaid's Tale and The Last of Us.

== Release ==
Hamnet (Original Motion Picture Soundtrack) was released digitally on 26 November 2025 under the Decca Records label. A vinyl edition of the album was released on 16 January 2026.

== Reception ==
Peter Debruge of Variety wrote "Sonically, Max Richter's "On the Nature of Daylight" gives this devastating scene an even deeper resonance." David Ehrlich of IndieWire called it "a delicate score that doesn't intrude on the drama until the film's nuclear-grade sobfest of a finale, which skirts dangerously close to emotional pornography as Zhao cues up [Richter's] most famous track." David Sims of The Atlantic wrote "The score, by the pianist Max Richter, also swells with feeling".

Justin Chang of The New Yorker noted that the implementation of Richter's "On the Nature of Daylight" "has grown hoary with overuse." Bilge Ebiri of Vulture noted that Richter's score immeasurably aided the film. Angie Han of The Hollywood Reporter and Phil de Semyen of Time Out called it an "ethereal score." Michael Ordoña of TheWrap called it a "gorgeous score". Pete Hammond of Deadline Hollywood called it a "lilting score" and subtly used in the film. For The Spool, Lisa Laman praised Richter's "transportive and emotionally rich score" and especially praised how tracks "like 'Of the undiscovered country' reverberate with fascinating collisions of haunting choirs and soaring string instruments." She further observed how Richter's compositions showed how the "jagged messiness of grief manifests in 'Hamnet's' intricate artistry."

== Track listing ==
No.	Title	Artist(s)	Length
1.	"Of Agnes"		2:16
2.	"Of Orpheus"		3:44
3.	"See things that others don't"		1:46
4.	"Look at me"		1:38
5.	"In all my philosophy"		2:25
6.	"Of earth and heaven"		7:38
7.	"An abysm of time"		1:59
8.	"Of the heart"		4:52
9.	"Of remembrance"		2:30
10.	"Of the sky"		5:01
11.	"I was the more deceived"		5:37
12.	"Inward"		1:41
13.	"Who are you looking for?"		1:49
14.	"The great globe itself"		1:49
15.	"Of a ghost"		8:46
16.	"Richter: On the Nature of Daylight"	Max Richter; Lorenz Dangel	6:37
17.	"My Robin to the greenwood did go"		1:44
18.	"Of the undiscovered country"		5:22
Total length:			67:03

== Personnel ==
Credits adapted from Film Music Reporter:

- Music composer and producer: Max Richter
- Music editor: Katrina Schiller
- Orchestrators: Max Richter, Dave Foster
- Conductor: Hugh Brunt
- Studio: Richter Mahr
- Recording: Rupert Coulson, Tom Bailey
- Mixing: Rupert Coulson
- Score editor: Tom Bailey
- Session librarian: Dave Foster
- Orchestra leader: Everton Nelson
- Orchestra contractor: Isobel Griffiths Ltd.
- Choir contractor: Ben Parry
- Choirmaster: Emily Dickens
- Choirs: London Voices, Tenebrae
- Musical assistance: Rob Ashbridge
- Music consultant and arrangements: William Lyons
- Percussion: Sam Wilson
- Piano: Max Richter
- Soprano vocalist: Grace Davidson
- Harp: Vicky Lester
- Studio manager: Rebecca Drake-Brockman

== Charts ==
=== Weekly charts ===
Weekly chart performance for Hamnet (Original Motion Picture Soundtrack)
Chart (2026)	Peak position
Australian Classical Albums (ARIA)	2
Australian Classical/Crossover Albums (ARIA)	3
Scottish Albums (Official Charts)	65
UK Albums Sales (OCC)	31
UK Classical Albums (OCC)	1
UK Soundtrack Albums (Official Charts)	3
US Top Classical Albums (Billboard)	6
US Top Classical Crossover Albums (Billboard)	5

=== Monthly charts ===
Monthly chart performance for Hamnet (Original Motion Picture Soundtrack)
Chart (2026)	Peak position
German Classical Albums (Offizielle Top 100)	9

== Accolades ==
Award	Date of ceremony	Category	Nominee(s)	Result	Ref.
Astra Film Awards	December 11, 2025	Best Original Score	Max Richter	Pending	
Hollywood Music in Media Awards	November 19, 2025	Best Original Score in a Feature Film	Max Richter	Nominated	
