= Russian Anti-Doping Agency =

National anti-doping organization

- РУСАДА
- Formation: January 2008
- Purpose: Anti-doping in sport
- Region served: Russia
- Director-General: Veronika Loginova
- Affiliations: Russian Olympic Committee; World Anti-Doping Agency (currently suspended)
- Website: rusada.ru

The Russian Anti-Doping Agency (RUSADA; Russian: Российское антидопинговое агентство, РУСАДА), established in January 2008, is the Russian National Anti-Doping Organisation (NADO), affiliated with (but suspended from, since 2015) the World Anti-Doping Agency (WADA).

== History ==
It was established under the rules of the UNESCO International Convention against Doping in Sport approved at the 33rd UNESCO General Conference on 19 October 2005, and ratified by the Russian Federation on 26 December 2006. As the Russian NADO, the organization operates the anti-doping programs for Russian Olympic and Paralympic sport.

The organization's WADA accreditation, which under normal circumstances would have been valid until 2017, is currently suspended due to compliance issues discussed below.

The agency website claims they are an organization independent from the Russian government.

The Acting Director-General of RUSADA, since at least October 2020, is Mikhail Bukhanov.

=== ARAF doping allegations ===
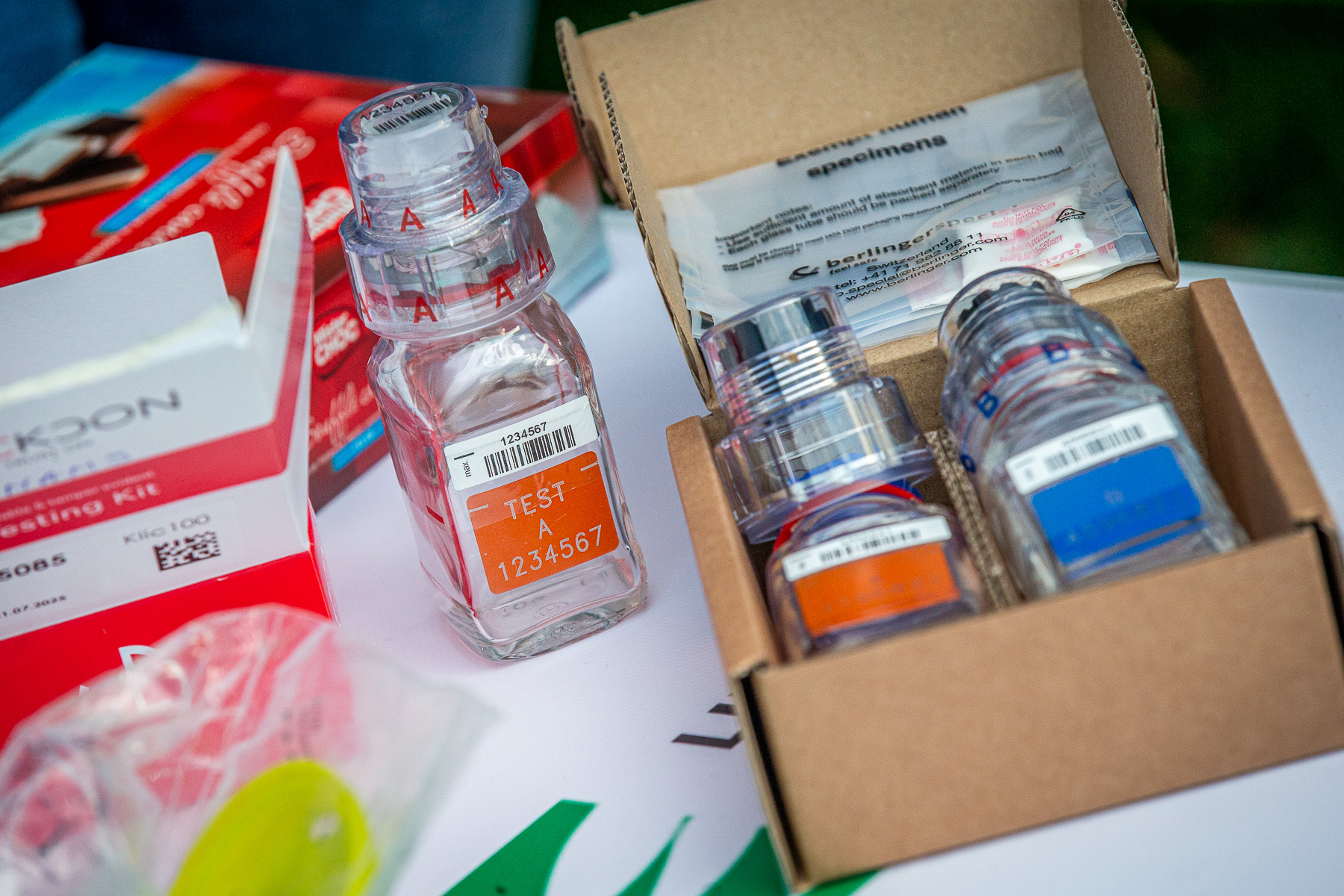
Doping sample collecting kit

Following allegations made by German broadcaster ARD in 2014, WADA commissioned a report into doping and associated corruption in Russian athletics. The report, published in November 2015, was highly critical of RUSADA and the All-Russia Athletic Federation (ARAF), as well as singling out several individuals for doping offences. It concluded that RUSADA was under improper influence from the Russian Ministry of Sport. They further alleged that the agency and its employees athletes gave advance notice of tests to athletes and "routinely" took bribes to cover up doping.

On 18 November 2015, WADA suspended the Moscow Anti-Doping Laboratory, a laboratory of RUSADA; however the organization was not dissolved and tests are to be done by other independent labs.

In February 2016, two high-ranking directors of the organisation—Vyacheslav Sinyev and Nikita Kamayev—died. According to The Sunday Times, Kamayev approached the news agency shortly before his death planning to publish a book on "the true story of sport pharmacology and doping in Russia since 1987".

=== 2016 McLaren Report ===
On 18 July 2016, Richard McLaren, a WADA-appointed investigator, published a 97-page report covering significant state-sponsored doping in Russia. It concluded that it was shown "beyond a reasonable doubt" that the RUSADA, the Ministry of Sport, the Federal Security Service (FSB) and the Centre of Sports Preparation of the National Teams of Russia had "operated for the protection of doped Russian athletes" within a "state-directed failsafe system" using "the disappearing positive [test] methodology." According to the McLaren report, the Disappearing Positive Methodology operated from "at least late 2011 to August 2015." It was used on 643 positive samples, a number that the authors consider "only a minimum" due to limited access to Russian records.

In response to these findings, WADA announced that RUSADA should be regarded as non-compliant with respect to the World Anti-Doping Code and recommended that Russian athletes be banned from competing at the 2016 Summer Olympics.

On 18 May 2018, WADA said that the RUSADA suspension will remain in place until they make progress towards full compliance. Four months later, on 20 September 2018, the suspension was lifted by WADA.
