= Quadruple jump =

Jump with four full revolutions

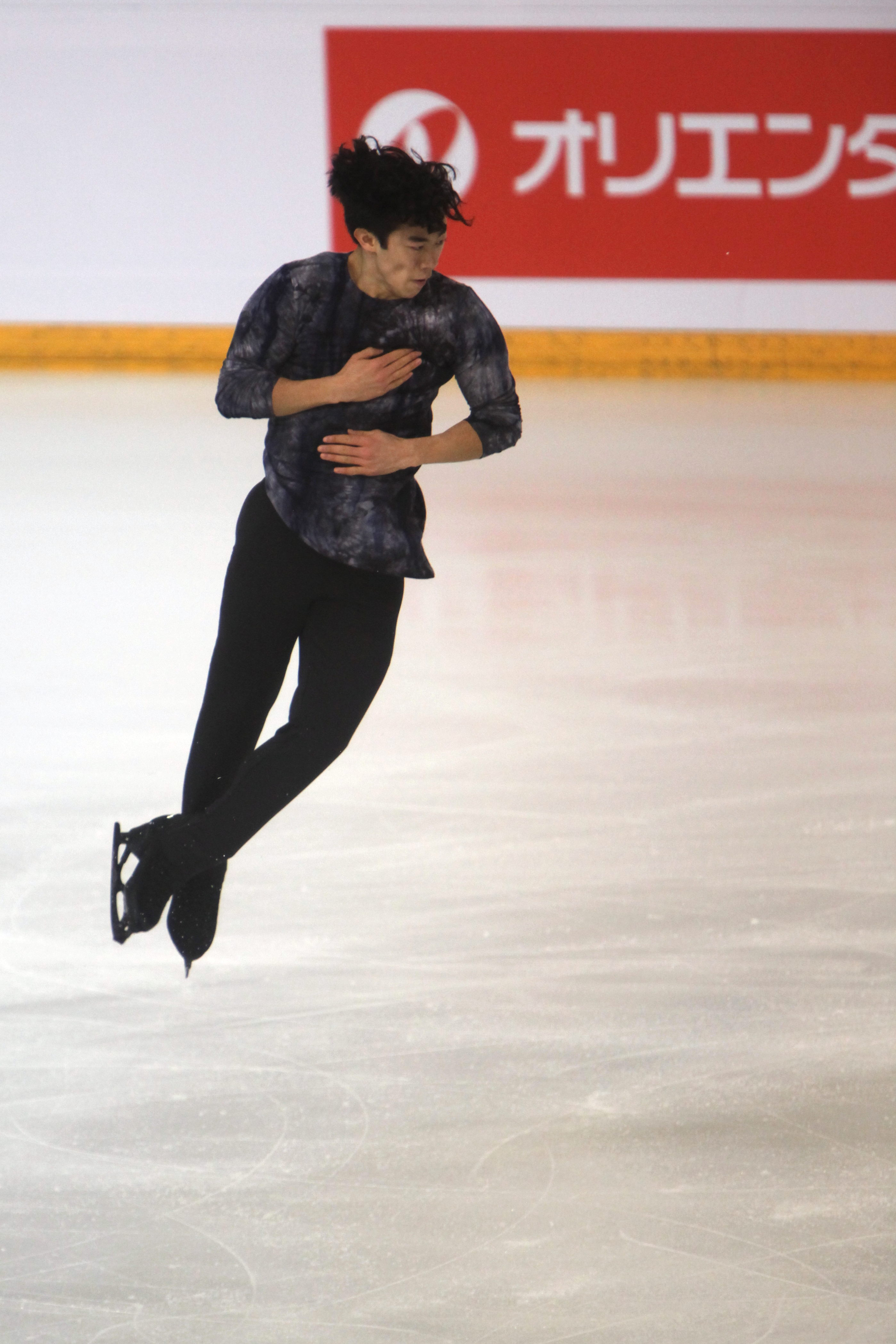
American skater Nathan Chen performing a quad jump during his free skate at the 2018 Internationaux de France.

A quadruple jump or quad is a figure skating jump with at least four (but fewer than five) revolutions. All quadruple jumps have four revolutions, except for the quadruple Axel, which has four and a half revolutions. The quadruple toe loop and quadruple Salchow are the two most commonly performed quads.

Quadruple jumps have become increasingly common among World and Olympic level men's single skaters, to the point that not performing a quad in a program has come to be seen as a severe disadvantage. This phenomenon is often referred to as the "quad revolution". Since 2018, quadruple jumps have also become an increasingly common feature of women's skating, although they are not allowed under the International Skating Union ("ISU") rules in the women's short program. The first person to land a ratified quadruple jump in competition was Canadian Kurt Browning in 1988. Japanese skater Miki Ando became the first woman to do so, in 2002.

== History of firsts ==
=== Men ===
The following table lists the first recorded quadruple jumps by male skaters in men's singles competition. Only successfully ratified jumps landed in an ISU sanctioned event, or officially recognized by the ISU count toward these records.

Abbr.	Jump	Skater	Nation	Event	Ref.
4T	Quadruple Toeloop	Kurt Browning	Canada	1988 World Championships	
4S	Quadruple Salchow	Timothy Goebel	United States	1998 Junior Grand Prix Final	
4Lo	Quadruple Loop	Yuzuru Hanyu	Japan	2016 Autumn Classic International	
4F	Quadruple Flip	Shoma Uno	Japan	2016 Team Challenge Cup	
4Lz	Quadruple Lutz	Brandon Mroz	United States	2011 Colorado Springs Invitational	
4A	Quadruple Axel	Ilia Malinin	United States	2022 CS U.S. International Classic	

Soviet skater Alexandre Fadeev was the first skater to attempt a quadruple jump (a quadruple toe loop) in competition, at the 1984 Winter Olympics in Sarajevo, but it was not officially recognized by the ISU because of a flawed landing. Jozef Sabovčík's attempted quadruple toe loop at the 1986 European Championships was better and it helped him to win gold medal, but it was not recognized either, although it is regularly mentioned as the inventor of a quadruple jump in Czech or Slovak language media.

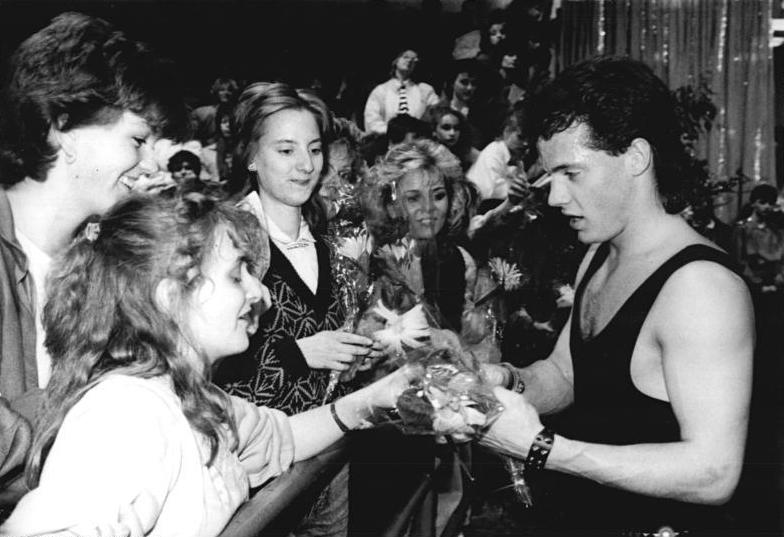
Canadian skater Kurt Browning (right), the first skater to land a quadruple jump in competition, pictured in 1989.

On March 25, 1988, at the 1988 World Championships in Budapest, Hungary, Canadian skater Kurt Browning landed the first ratified quadruple jump (a quadruple toe loop) in competition (with three turns on the landing). Browning said: "I remember that there were a few people landing the jump (in practice) long before I did, and by watching them I was inspired to try it myself. After landing it, I certainly expected more skaters to start doing it in competition. I was surprised in the next few years when that really did not happen."

At the 1994 Winter Olympics in Lillehammer, Norway, Chinese skater Zhang Min landed the first clean quadruple (a quadruple toe loop) in Olympic competition.

On March 7, 1998, at the 1997–98 Junior Grand Prix Final in Lausanne, Switzerland, American skater Timothy Goebel landed the first ratified quadruple Salchow in combination with a double toe loop.

On September 16, 2011, in the short program at the Colorado Springs Invitational, American skater Brandon Mroz landed the first ratified quadruple Lutz in a sanctioned competition. On November 12, he landed a ratified quadruple Lutz at the NHK Trophy, becoming the first skater to successfully land a quadruple Lutz in international competition.

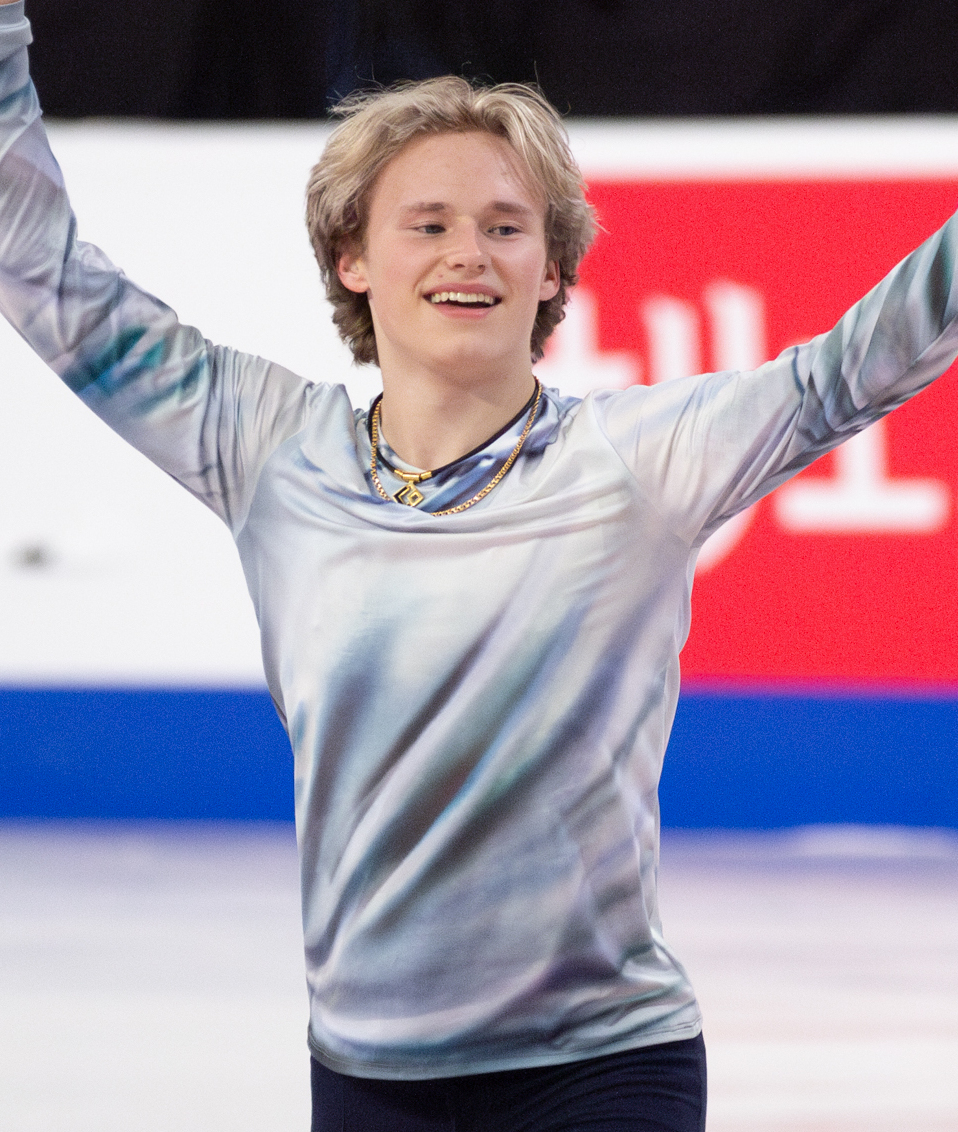
Ilia Malinin remains the only skater to have ever landed a quad axel in competition.

On April 22, 2016, in the short program at the Team Challenge Cup in Spokane, United States, Japanese skater Shoma Uno landed the first ratified quadruple flip in competition.

On September 30, 2016, in the short program at the Autumn Classic International in Montreal, Canada, Japanese skater Yuzuru Hanyu landed the first ratified quadruple loop in competition.

The first quadruple Axel attempt was by Russian skater Artur Dmitriev Jr. at the 2018 Rostelecom Cup. He landed forward and fell, receiving both a downgrade and fall deduction. Yuzuru Hanyu also attempted a quadruple Axel during the 2021–22 Japan Figure Skating Championships, although it was downgraded to a triple Axel with a two-footed landing. At the 2022 Winter Olympics, Hanyu’s quadruple Axel attempt received deductions for an under-rotation and a fall but was the first attempt in competition that was not downgraded to a triple Axel. On September 14, 2022, in the free skate at the 2022 CS U.S. International Figure Skating Classic, American skater Ilia Malinin landed the first successful quadruple Axel in competition. As of April 2026, he is the only skater to successfully land the jump in competition.

Malinin is also the first skater to have successfully landed all six types of quadruple jumps in international competition, as well as the first skater to land six quadruple jumps with positive grades of execution in a single free skate at an international competition. This feat was accomplished at the 2024 World Figure Skating Championships in Montreal. Although not all received positive grades of execution, during his free skate program at the 2025 World Figure Skating Championships in Boston, Ilia Malinin landed all six types of quadruple jumps. At the 2025 Grand Prix Final in Nagoya, Malinin became the first skater to successfully perform seven quadruple jumps in a single program and the first skater to land all six types of quadruple jumps with positive grades of execution in a single free skate at an international competition.

No quadruple-quadruple combination (quadruple jumps followed by quadruple loop or toe loop) or sequences (quadruple jumps followed by any quadruple jumps except for quadruple loop or toe loop) have yet been ratified. However, other quadruple combinations have been performed. Canada's Elvis Stojko landed the first quadruple jump in combination (a quadruple toe loop-double toe loop) at the 1991 World Championships. Stojko also landed the first quadruple-triple combination (a quadruple toe loop-triple toe loop) at the 1997–98 Champions Series Final in December 1997. Russian skater Evgeni Plushenko performed the world's first quadruple-triple-double combination (a quadruple toe loop-triple toe loop-double loop) at the 1999 NHK Trophy. Plushenko also landed the first quadruple-triple-triple combination (a quadruple toe loop-triple toe loop-triple loop) in competition at the 2002 Cup of Russia. Yuzuru Hanyu landed the first quadruple-triple sequence (a quadruple toe loop-triple Axel) at the 2018 Grand Prix of Helsinki. Kazakhstan's Mikhail Shaidorov successfully landed the first triple axel-quad toe loop at the 2024 Grand Prix de France, becoming the first skater to land a combination in which a quad is the second jump in competition. Shaidorov also became the first skater to attempt a quadruple-quadruple combination in an ISU competition when he included a quadruple toe loop-euler-quadruple Salchow combination in the second half of his 2026 Cup of China free skate, which received a negative grade of execution.

=== Women ===
The following table lists the first recorded quadruple jumps by female skaters in women's singles competition. Only successfully ratified jumps landed in an ISU sanctioned event or officially recognized by the ISU count towards these records.

Abbr.	Jump	Skater	Nation	Event	Ref.
4T	Quadruple Toeloop	Alexandra Trusova	Russia	2018 World Junior Championships	
4S	Quadruple Salchow	Miki Ando	Japan	2002 Junior Grand Prix Final	
4Lo	Quadruple Loop	None internationally ratified			
4F	Quadruple Flip	Alexandra Trusova	Russia	2019 Grand Prix of Figure Skating Final	
4Lz	Quadruple Lutz	Alexandra Trusova	Russia	2018 JGP Armenia	
4A	Quadruple Axel	None performed			

French skater Surya Bonaly was the first female skater to attempt a quadruple jump in competition. She attempted a quad toe loop and a quad Salchow at the 1990 European Championships, however the jumps were not ratified. She attempted quad jumps at four more competitions (including the 1992 Winter Olympics), the final being the 1996 World Championships, but all were unsuccessful.

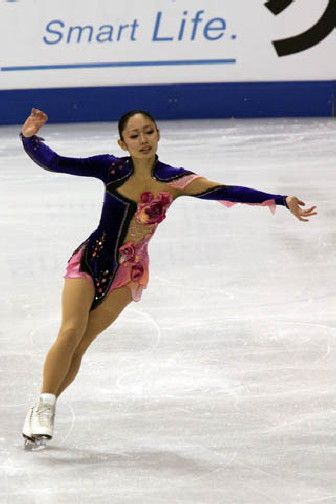
Japanese skater Miki Ando, first female skater to land a quad in competition, pictured at the 2009 World Championships.

On December 14, 2002, Japanese skater Miki Ando became the first female skater to land a ratified quadruple jump (a Salchow) in her free skate at the 2002 Junior Grand Prix Final in The Hague, Netherlands.

On March 10, 2018, in the free skate at the World Junior Figure Skating Championships in Sofia, Bulgaria, Russian skater Alexandra Trusova became the first female skater to land a ratified quadruple toe loop in competition. She also became the first female skater to successfully land two quads in one free skate.

Russian skater Alexandra Trusova was the first female skater to land a quadruple jump in combination (a quad toe loop-triple toe loop), at the ISU Junior Grand Prix in Lithuania in September 2018.

On October 12, 2018, in the free skate at the Junior Grand Prix in Yerevan, Armenia, Alexandra Trusova landed the first ratified quadruple Lutz in international competition, becoming the first woman to land the jump.

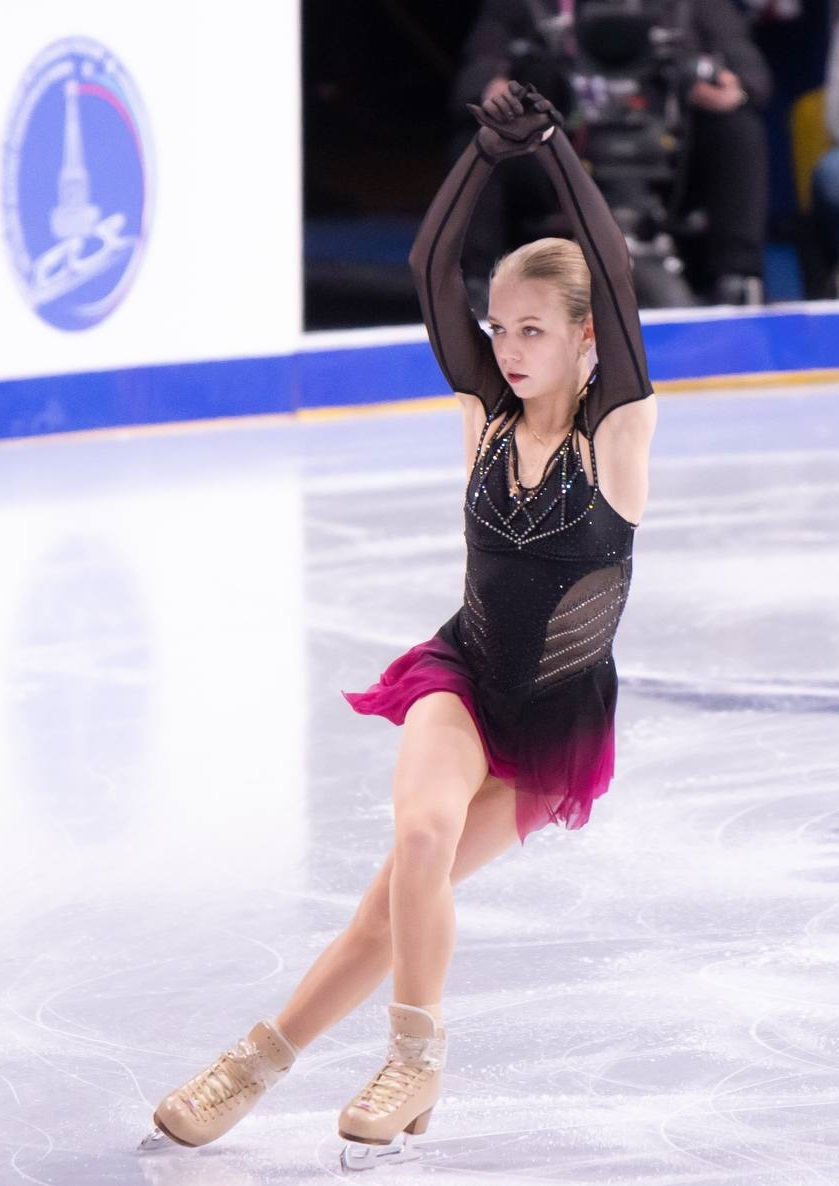
Alexandra Trusova was the first woman to land both the quad lutz and quad flip in competition.

On December 7, 2019, in the free skate at the Grand Prix Final in Torino, Italy, Alexandra Trusova landed the first ratified quadruple flip in competition.

At the 2021 Russian Grand Prix V, Perm, Adeliia Petrosian attempted two quadruple loops, landing one in combination. Though this achievement is not internationally ratified, she is the first woman to land a quadruple loop in a domestic competition.

The first female skater to land a quadruple jump in Olympic competition was during the 2022 Winter Olympics, this achievement, originally, went to Kamila Valieva of the Russian Olympic Committee in the team event women’s free skate. However, she was later disqualified following a doping violation from earlier in the season, thus her achievement nullified. The achievement then was given to Alexandra Trusova of the Russian Olympic Committee where she jumped 5 quadruple jumps during the women’s free skate.

As of 2026, no female skater has attempted a quadruple Axel in competition.

=== Pairs ===
Abbr.	Jump	Skaters	Nation	Event	Ref.
4Tw	Quad Twist	Marina Cherkasova and Sergei Shakrai	Russia	1977 European Championships	
4TTh	Throw Quad Toeloop	None ratified			
4STh	Throw Quad Salchow	Tiffany Vise and Derek Trent	United States	2007 Trophée Eric Bompard	
4LoTh	Throw Quad Loop	None ratified			
4FTh	Throw Quad Flip	None performed			
4LzTh	Throw Quad Lutz	None ratified			
4AxTh	Throw Quad Axel	None performed			

In pair skating competition, Russian skaters Marina Cherkasova and Sergei Shakrai performed the first ever quadruple twist lift in competition during their free skate at the 1977 European Championships.

At the 2002 Winter Olympics in Salt Lake City, Utah, United States, Chinese pairs skaters Shen Xue and Zhao Hongbo became the first skaters to attempt a throw quadruple jump (a throw quad Salchow). She landed, then fell, and the jump was not ratified. On November 17, 2007, in the free skate at the Trophée Eric Bompard competition in Paris, France, American pairs skaters Tiffany Vise and Derek Trent landed the first ratified throw quadruple jump (a quad Salchow). At the 2018 Winter Olympics in Pyeongchang, South Korea, Canadian pairs skaters Meagan Duhamel and Eric Radford completed the first throw quadruple Salchow in Olympic competition.

In 2004, Chinese pairs skaters Ding Yang and Ren Zhongfei attempted a throw quadruple toe loop at the Four Continents Championships; the landing was two-footed.

In 2015, Russian pairs skaters Yuko Kavaguti and Alexander Smirnov, at a domestic competition (1st stage of 2015 SPB Cup) became the first skaters to attempt a throw quadruple loop. The landing was two-footed, then she fell. Later in 2015, Kavaguti and Smirnov performed a throw quadruple loop at the 2015 Cup of China, although the landing was two-footed.

Also in 2015, Canadian pairs skaters Meagan Duhamel and Eric Radford, at a domestic competition (2015 Souvenir Georges-Ethier), attempted the first throw quadruple Lutz, but she fell on the landing.

== Scoring ==
The quad jump is currently the highest scoring single element in the skater's program short of performing combinations. The higher scoring for more difficult elements was put in place by the introduction of the ISU Judging System in 2004. Before then, the technical scores for each skater were capped at 6.0. The current ISU scoring for quad jumps in base values is listed below.

Base values for quad jumps
Abbr.	Jump	Base value
4T	Quad Toeloop	9.5
4S	Quad Salchow	9.7
4Lo	Quad Loop	10.5
4F	Quad Flip	11
4Lz	Quad Lutz	11.5
4A	Quad Axel	12.5

== Execution ==
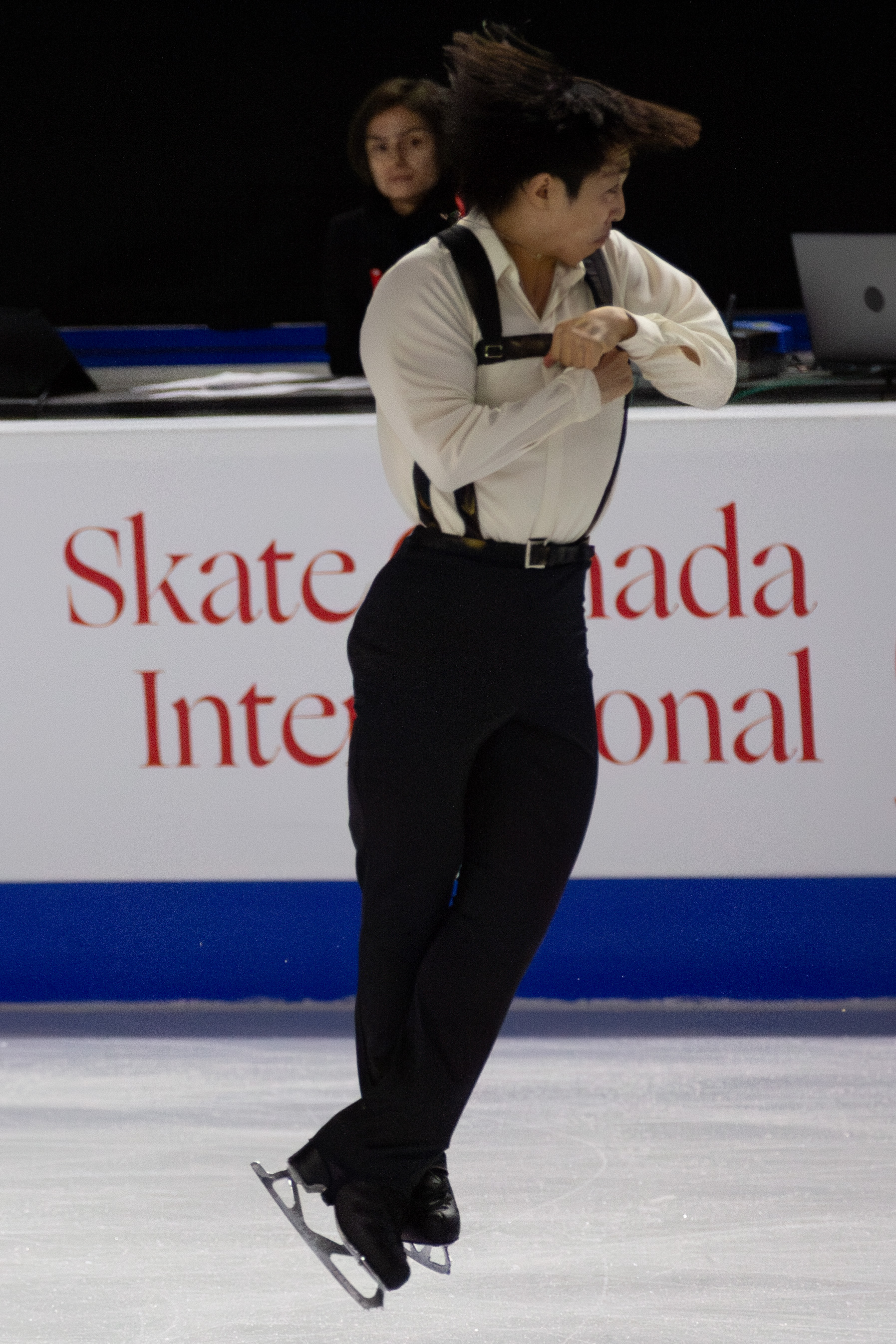
Kao Miura of Japan performing a quad jump.

All quadruple jumps have four revolutions, except for the quadruple Axel, which has four and a half revolutions.

A jump harness is often employed in training quads. Quads require an average rotational frequency of around 340 rpm, with the peak rotational frequency usually exceeding 400 rpm. The optimum height is estimated to be around 51 cm (20 in); however, most skaters rarely go above 46 cm (18 in). This is partly because of the heaviness of the skates and partly because skaters have to maintain the balance between the energy put into the jump versus the energy put into the rotation. The height of a quad can be between five percent and eight percent higher than a triple jump. If skaters cannot achieve the necessary height, they must spin faster to compensate. Efficient body contraction is also important due to conservation of angular momentum. According to Deborah King, a professor of exercise and sports sciences at Ithaca College, quads have a slightly higher angular momentum than lower difficulty jumps, but the major difference is in how skaters control the moment of inertia.

Skaters usually begin rotating the jump as soon as they leave the ice, but generally have less than two-thirds of a second to complete their rotation. However, some skaters begin rotating their jumps before they leave the ice, which is known as pre-rotation. This technique is reliant on the skater being physically small and puts added strain on the back, thereby increasing the risk of injury. It is particularly favoured by Russian women skaters but usually fails post-puberty. Despite being considered an example of flawed technique, it is not currently penalised by the technical panel.

Greater understanding of successful jump technique has developed over time. Kurt Browning, the first skater to land a ratified quad in competition, has said that when training the jump, "we really just jumped as high as we could and pulled in as hard as we could and hoped for the best." The smallest error may make the difference in the success of a quad attempt. Max Aaron has stated that "The minute your left arm is behind you, or your three-turn is too fast, if your hips don't turn in time, if your foot isn't in the right place, anything will throw you off." Research indicates that changes in arm position of even three or four degrees can significantly affect the rotational speed. According to Ross Miner, the quality of the ice can also affect the success of the jump, especially for the quad Salchow.

== Controversy ==
Performing quads, whether in practice or competition, increases the risk of injury as well as the level of wear and tear on a skater's body. According to Aaron, "the force of a quadruple is huge", and practicing them means "you're going to fall a lot and take a beating". There is a lack of research into the impact of quads on the joints, but the repetitive nature of jump training and the fact that skaters always land on the same foot means that skaters are at risk of developing microfractures that can become more serious with time. Because of this, some coaches try to limit the number of jump repetitions skaters do in practice.

Concerns have been raised about the long-term impact of quads on the bodies of young skaters, especially girls. As of 2026, Elizabet Tursynbaeva of Kazakhstan, Rion Sumiyoshi of Japan, and Alexandra Trusova of Russia are the only female skaters over the age of 18 to ever land a quad in international competition. The figure skating community remains divided about the sustainability of such jumps for women past puberty. Rafael Arutyunyan, coach of skaters such as Nathan Chen and Ashley Wagner, has questioned, "Will they still land these jumps at age 18 or 19? They are doing these jumps with bodies that have not developed yet, with bones that are still growing. What will they be at age 40? Will they all need new hips?" His concern has been echoed by fellow coach Linda Leaver, who predicts that "it will be extremely rare for a female skater to be able to do multiple quadruple jumps past puberty". She added, "I also think careers for men will be shorter because of the stress on backs, knees, and ankles, and the body type will be more of a determinate in who can dominate the sport."

The observation that pre-pubescent girls, especially, have an advantage when it comes to quads was one of the stated reasons for the original introduction in 2018 of the proposal to increase the senior category age limit in figure skating to 17. "Younger skaters are able to show more difficult elements until they are fully matured. Therefore we are currently losing Seniors [sic] skaters who are afraid they cannot compete with these younger skaters in Senior Events." This reason was also given by some who responded to the survey conducted by the ISU asking whether the minimum age should be increased, and was listed as a reason for the increase in the ISU FAQ on the subject.

== See also ==
- Quadruple jump controversy
