= Short program (figure skating) =

Segment in a figure skating competition

The short program of figure skating is the first of two segments of competitions, skated before the free skating program. It lasts, for both senior and junior singles and pair skaters, 2 minutes and 40 seconds. In synchronized skating, for both juniors and seniors, the short program lasts 2 minutes and 50 seconds. Vocal music with lyrics is allowed for all disciplines since the 2014–2015 season. The short program for single skaters and for pair skaters consists of seven required elements, and there are six required elements for synchronized skaters.

== Overview ==
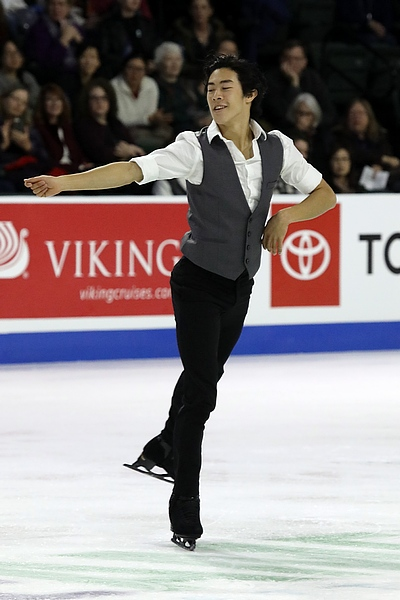
Nathan Chen during his short program at the 2018 Skate America.

The short program, along with the free skating program, is a segment of single skating, pair skating, and synchronized skating in all ISU championships, the Olympic Winter Games, the Winter Youth Olympic Games, and for junior and senior level skaters, all ISU Grand Prix events and finals. It has been previously called the "original" or "technical" program. The short program was added to single skating in 1973, creating a three-part competition until compulsory figures were eliminated in 1990. The short program for pair skating was introduced at the 1963 European Championships, the 1964 World Championships, and the 1968 Olympics; previously, pair skaters only had to perform the free skating program in competitions. Synchronized skating has traditionally consisted of two competition segments: the short program and the free skating program.

The short program must be skated before the free skate. It lasts, for both senior and junior singles and pairs, 2 minutes and 40 seconds. The ISU states that the time a program begins "must be reckoned" from the moment the skater begins to move or skate until they come to a complete stop at the end of their program. In synchronized skating, for both juniors and seniors, the short program lasts 2 minutes and 50 seconds, "but may be less". Vocal music with lyrics is allowed in all disciplines since the 2014–2015 season. The first time vocal music was allowed at the Olympics was in 2018. (Note: The ISU has allowed vocals in the music used in ice dance since the 1997–1998 season.)

Pair skating, which has never included a compulsory phase like the other figure skating disciplines, did not require a short program until the early 1960s, when the ISU "instituted a short program of required moves" as the first part of pair competitions. The short program for pair skating first appeared at the European Championships in 1963, the World Championships in 1964, and the Olympics in 1968. The arrangement of the specific moves, also unlike compulsory figures for single skaters and the compulsory dance for ice dancers, was up to each pair team. According to writer Ellyn Kestnbaum, the short programs introduced in single men and women competitions in 1973 were modeled after the pair skating short program, and the structure of competitions in both single and pair competitions has been identical since the elimination of compulsory figures in 1990.

Skaters' and teams' entire performance is evaluated by three program components: composition, presentation, and skating skills. Both pair skating partners must demonstrate the criteria equally. Unity, connections between and within elements, choreography reflecting the skaters' musical phrase and form, multidimensional movements and use of space, and pattern and ice coverage are considered when judges evaluate skaters' composition. The ISU defines composition as "the intentional, developed and/or original arrangement of the repertoire of all types of movements into a meaningful whole according to the principles of proportion, unity, space, pattern, and musical structure". Judges also evaluate skaters' presentation, which is defined as "the demonstration of engagement, commitment and involvement based on an understanding of the music and composition". Judges must consider skaters' expressiveness and projection, the variety and contrast of their energy and movements, their musical sensitivity and timing, and, for pair skaters, "oneness and awareness of space". The following must be considered when judging skaters' skating skills, which is defined as "the ability of the Skater to execute the skating repertoire of steps, turns, and skating movement, with blade and body control": variety of edges, steps, turns, movements and directions; clarity of edges, steps, turns, movements and body control; balance and glide; power and speed; flow; and for pair skaters, unison.

Nathan Chen from the United States holds the highest recorded single men's short program score at 113.97, which he scored at the 2022 Beijing Olympics. Russian skater Kamila Valieva holds the highest single women's short program score of 87.42, which she earned at the 2021 Rostelecom Cup in Sochi, Russia. Valieva also previously held the world record with a score of 90.45 at the 2022 European Figure Skating Championships, from which she was disqualified due to doping. Chinese pairs team Sui Wenjing and Han Cong hold the highest pair skating short program score of 84.41, which they earned at 2022 Beijing Olympics. Wenjing and Cong also hold the two highest short program scores. (Note: After the 2018-2019 season, due to the change in grade of execution scores from -3 to +3 to -5 to +5, all statistics started from zero and all previous scores were listed as "historical".)

== Requirements ==
=== Single skating ===
The short program for senior single skaters consists of seven required elements. The sequence of the elements is optional. Skaters can choose their own music, but their programs must be skated in harmony with it. If a skater executes an extra jump or jumps, "only the individual jump(s) which is not according to requirements will have no value". Jumps are judged in the order of their execution.

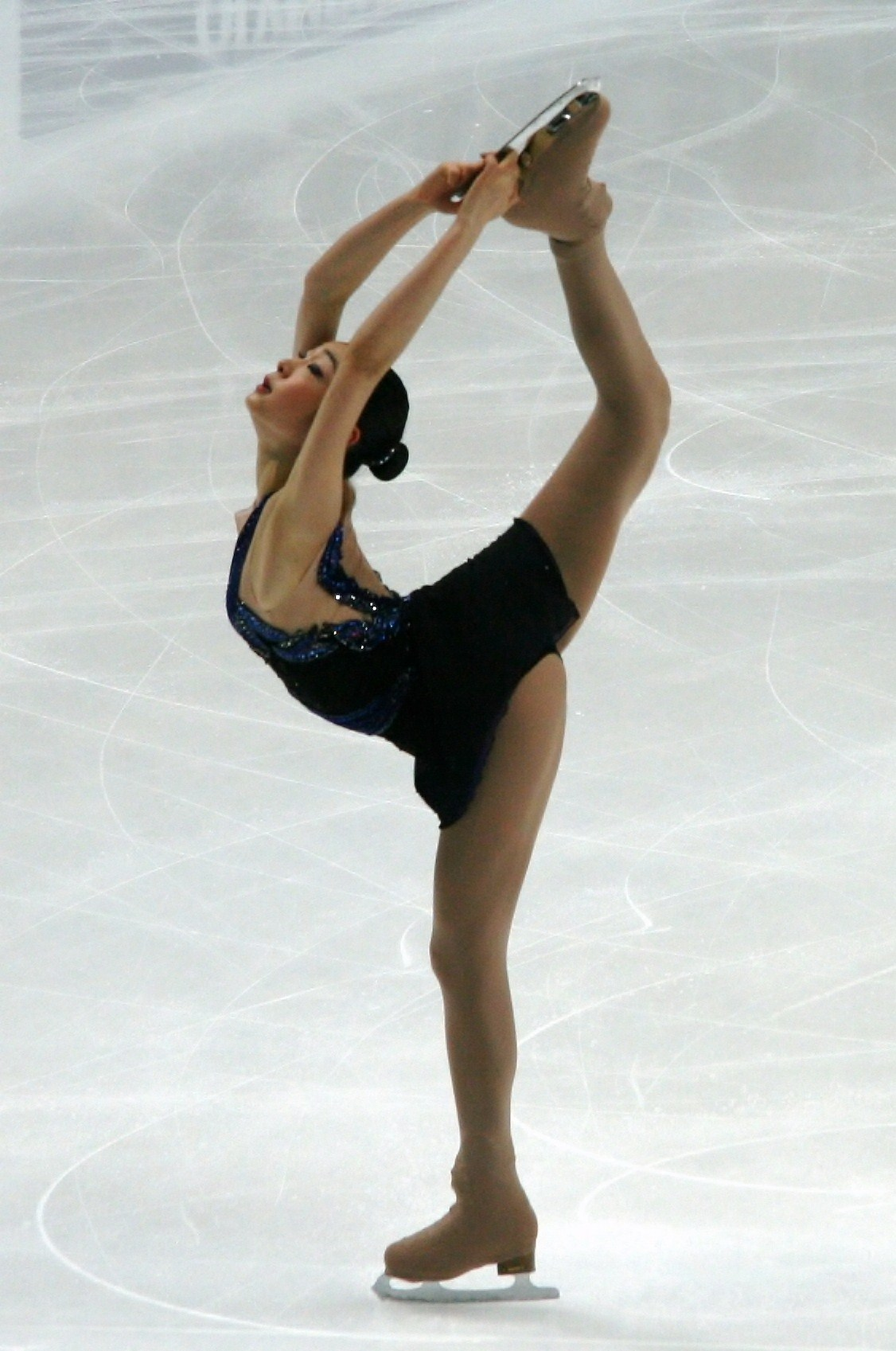
Yu-Na Kim performs a Bielmann spin during her short program at the 2011 World Figure Skating Championships

Men single senior skaters must have the following elements in their short program:

1. A double or triple Axel
2. One triple or quadruple jump
3. A jump combination consisting of a double jump and a triple jump, two triple jumps, or a quadruple jump and a double or triple jump
4. One flying spin
5. A camel spin or sit spin with just one change of foot
6. A spin combination with just one change of foot
7. A step sequence using the entire ice surface

Women single senior skaters must have the following elements in their short program:

1. A double or triple Axel
2. One triple jump
3. A jump combination consisting of a double jump and a triple jump or two triple jumps
4. One flying spin
5. Either a layback/sideways leaning spin or a sit or camel spin without a change of foot
6. A spin combination with just one change of foot
7. A step sequence using the entire ice surface

Junior single skaters also have seven required elements, which can be performed in any sequence, and comprise three groups that last over three seasons. (Note: See ISU's "2024 S&P/ID Regulations" for the lists of the groups for the 2024-2025, 2025-2026, 2026-2027 seasons.)

Senior male single skaters can execute any triple or quadruple jump they like, although when a quadruple jump is executed in a jump combination, a different quadruple jump can be included as a solo jump. Senior men and women and junior men cannot execute an additional Axel jump to fulfill the second requirement of a triple or quadruple jump, and it cannot be repeated as a solo jump or jump combination. Senior women can choose any triple jump to meet the second requirement, but junior men and women are limited to executing the prescribed double or triple jump. Quintuple jumps are not allowed in the short program.

All levels of skaters must execute different jumps in their jump combinations than the jump they choose to fulfill their solo jump requirement. However, senior men can choose the same jump or a different double, triple, or quadruple jump. When they execute a quadruple jump to fulfill their quadruple or triple jump requirement (#2), they can include a different quadruple jump in their jump combination. Senior women and junior men and women can include either the same jump or a different double or triple jump in their combination jump. An Euler jump is not allowed in the jump combination in the short program.

A skater will not get any credit for spins "if there is no spin position before and/or after the change of foot" and if it does not have at least three revolutions. Only flying spins can begin with a jump. Seniors can choose to execute any type of flying spin with a landing position different from the spin in one position, but juniors can only execute the prescribed type of flying spin. When awarding the grade of execution for a flying spin, judges must ascertain whether skaters performed a step-over while executing it. Only eight revolutions in the landing position can be different from the flying position. No previous rotation can be done before the skater takes off for the flying spin, and the "required eight revolutions can be executed in any variation of the landing position".

Both senior and junior men can execute their spins with only one change of foot, but senior men must choose to execute either the sit position or camel position of their chosen spin, and this position must be different from the landing position of their flying spin.The ISU also requires that "[t]he spin must consist of only one change of foot, which may be executed in the form of a step over or a jump with not less than six revolutions on each foot in the chosen basic position". Junior men can only perform the prescribed camel or sit position, and the spin must have only one change of foot, which can be done in either the form of a jump with no fewer than six revolutions on each foot in the basic position they have chosen or in the form of a step-over.

When women single skaters execute a layback- or sideways-leaning spin, they can assume any position they like, but only if "the basic layback or sideways leaning position is maintained for eight revolutions without rising to an upright position". They can execute a Biellmann position after they have completed the required eight revolutions and can spin in one position without a change of foot for a minimum of eight revolutions in this position and with any variation and/or variations in the chosen position. For both men and women, "[i]f the landing position of the Flying spin is the same that in the Spin in one position, the last performed of these two spins will not be counted", but will be marked by the judges as complete.

Spin combinations must include just one change of foot, which may be executed in the form of a jump or a step-over, with no fewer than six revolutions on each foot. Skaters can execute their change of position or change of foot either at the same time or separately.

Step sequences can include unlisted jumps with any number of revolutions and listed jumps with just one revolution. If the skater includes listed jumps with over one revolution, the step sequence will not be counted.

=== Pair skating ===
Keauna McLaughlin and Rockne Brubaker perform a death spiral in their short program at the 2008 U.S. Figure Skating Championships

Both junior and senior pair skaters have seven required elements that form three groups spanning over three seasons. For example, seniors during the 2025–2026 season had to perform the following:

1. Any Lasso lift take-off
2. Either a double or triple twist lift
3. Either a double or triple throw jump
4. Either a double or triple solo jump
5. A solo spin combination with just one change of foot
6. A backward-inside death spiral
7. A step sequence using the entire ice surface

Junior pair skaters also had three groups of required elements. In 2024–2025, they had the same requirements as senior teams, although with two differences: they had to perform either a double or triple Salchow throw jump, and a double flip jump or double Axel solo jump. (Note: As of the 2026-2027 season, the solo spin combination will be replaced by the pair spin combination for both junior and senior pair skating teams.120) The sequence of the elements is optional, and their short programs must be skated in harmony with the music they choose.

Only the prescribed overhead lift take-off and death spiral are allowed. Both junior and senior pair skaters can only perform either a Lutz or a flip take-off by the woman, but women can only perform two or three free rotations in the air. Seniors can perform any double or triple jump and throw jump, but juniors can only perform what has been prescribed. Seniors can perform any double or triple solo jump, but juniors can only perform the prescribed jump.

The solo spin combination can commence with a jump. It "must have a minimum of two different basic positions with two revolutions in each of these positions by both partners anywhere within the spin". Both partners must perform all three basic positions to earn their full value.

For spin combinations, pair skaters "must include only one change of foot with not less than five revolutions on each foot by both partners". The change of foot may be done in the form of either a jump or a step-over, and the change of foot and change of positions must be made either at the same time or separately. After the 2026–2027 season, however, the pair spin combination must include a minimum of one change of foot by both partners, although not necessarily completed by both partners at the same time.

Also after 2026, at least two different basic positions had to include two revolutions in each position by both partners, and both partners must include at least one change of position.Additionally, pair spin combinations must have at least eight revolutions; if not, the team would lose points for the element. If a spin had fewer than three revolutions, it was not counted as a spin but was counted as a skating movement. Finally, the method judges used to count the number of revolutions was changed, starting from the entry of the spin until its exit.

For step sequences, they have to be performed together or close together, and can include any unlisted jumps. Pair skaters may also perform short stops, if done "in accordance with the music".

=== Synchronized skating ===
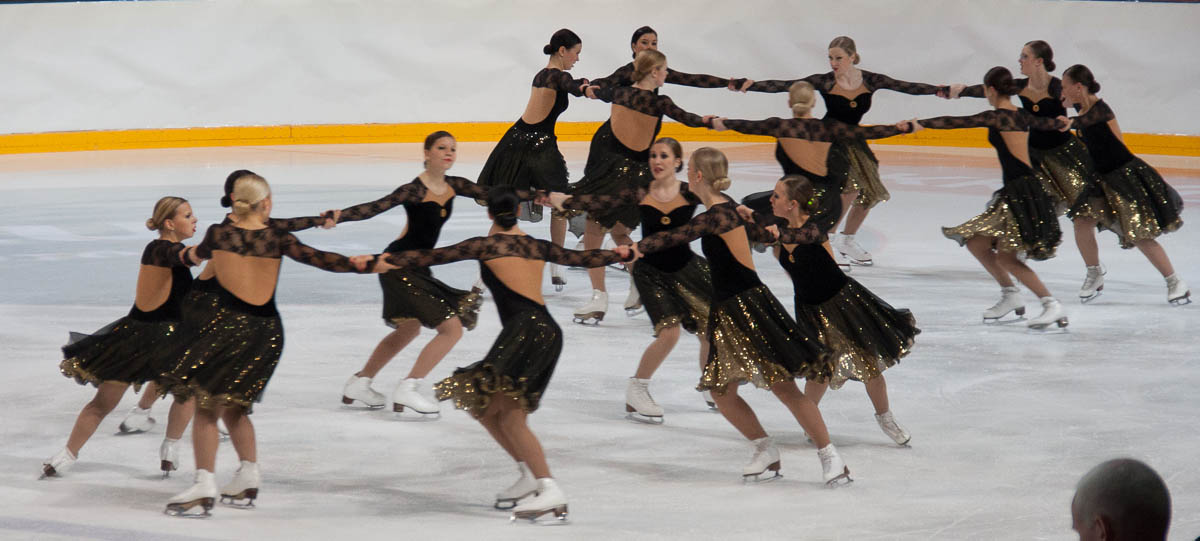
Team Golden Blades performs a circle rotating element during their short program at the qualifiers for the 2010 Finnish Synchronized Skating Championships

In synchronized skating, both juniors and seniors must perform a maximum of six required elements. The sequence of the elements is optional. The ISU, out of the following 14 elements, chooses and publicizes the required elements for the junior and senior short program yearly. They include:

1. One artistic element
2. One creative element
3. An intersection element
4. A group lift element (but only for senior teams, when required)
5. A block or line linear element
6. A move element
7. A mixed element
8. one no-hold element
9. A pair element
10. A block or line pivoting element
11. A circle or wheel rotating element
12. A synchronized spin element
13. A circle or wheel traveling element
14. A twizzle element

== See also ==
- History of figure skating

== Works cited ==
- Hines, James R. (2011). Historical Dictionary of Figure Skating. Lanham, Maryland: Scarecrow Press. ISBN 978-0-8108-6859-5.
- Kestnbaum, Ellyn (2003). Culture on Ice: Figure Skating and Cultural Meaning. Middletown, Connecticut: Wesleyan University Press. ISBN 0819566411.
- "Special Regulations & Technical Rules – Single & Pair Skating and Ice Dance 2024" (PDF). International Skating Union. Archived (PDF) from the original on 9 November 2024.
- "Special Regulations & Technical Rules Synchronized Skating 2024" (PDF). International Skating Union. Archived (PDF) from the original on 18 October 2025.
