= Toe loop jump =

Element in figure skating

Figure skating element
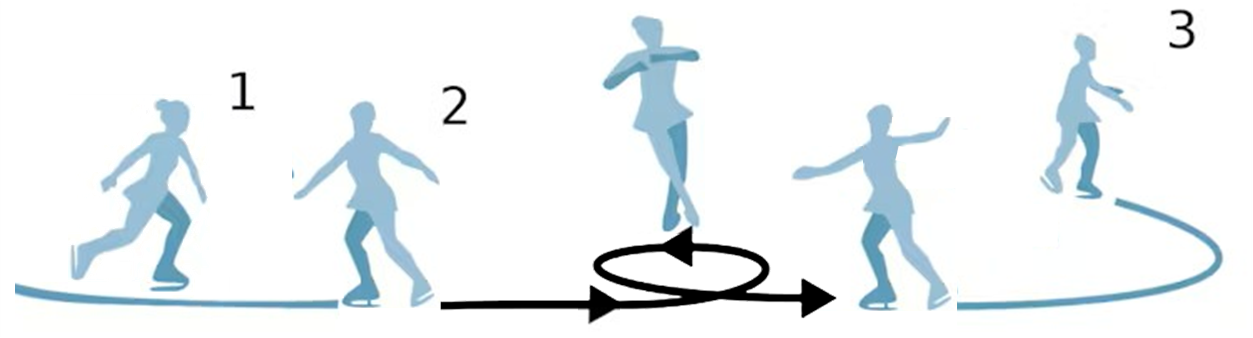
- Illustration of a single toe loop jump
- Element name: Toe loop jump
- Scoring abbreviation: T
- Element type: Jump
- Take-off edge: Back outside
- Landing edge: Back outside
- Inventor: Bruce Mapes

The toe loop jump is the simplest of the six jumps in the sport of figure skating. It was invented in the 1920s by American professional figure skater Bruce Mapes, who may have also invented the flip jump.

The skater skates forward on the inside edge of the blade, switches to a backward-facing position, and takes off from a back outside edge with help from the other foot's toe pick. The skater lands on the same back outside edge.

In competition, the toe loop is the most commonly performed jump and the most common second jump of a combination. The base value of a single toe loop is 0.40; the base value of a double toe loop is 1.30; the base value of a triple toe loop is 4.20; the base value of a quadruple toe loop is 9.50, and the base value for a quintuple toe loop is 14.

== Firsts ==
Abbr.	Jump element	Skater	Nation	Event	Ref.
3T	Triple toe loop	Thomas Litz	United States	1964 World Championships	(Note: The triple toe loop is "not definitely established" in the women's discipline.)
4T	Quadruple toe loop (men's)	Kurt Browning	Canada	1988 World Championships	(Note: Jozef Sabovcik of Czechoslovakia landed a quadruple toe loop at the 1986 European Championships, which was recognized at the event but then ruled invalid three weeks later due to a touchdown with his free foot.)
4T	Quadruple toe loop (women's)	Alexandra Trusova	Russia	2018 World Junior Championships	
4T+2T	Quad toe loop-double toe loop	Elvis Stojko	Canada	1991 World Championships	
4T+3T	Quad toe loop-triple toe loop (men's)	Elvis Stojko	Canada	1991 World Championships	
4T+3T	Quad toe loop-triple toe loop (women's)	Alexandra Trusova	Russia	2018 Junior Grand Prix Lithuania	
4T+3T+2Lo	Quad toe loop-triple toe loop-double loop	Evgeni Plushenko	Russia	1999 NHK Trophy	
4T+3T+3Lo	Quad toe loop-triple toe loop-triple loop	Evgeni Plushenko	Russia	2002 Cup of Russia	
4T+3T+3T	Quad toe loop-triple toe loop-triple toe loop	Kevin van der Perren	Belgium	2010 World Championships	
4T+1Eu+3S	Quad toe loop-Euler-triple Salchow	Alexei Yagudin	Russia	2001 Skate Canada International	
4T+1Eu+3F	Quad toe loop-Euler-triple flip	Yuzuru Hanyu	Japan	2019 Skate Canada International	
4T+3A+SEQ	Quad toe loop-triple Axel	Yuzuru Hanyu	Japan	2018 Grand Prix of Helsinki	
4S+3T	Quad Salchow-triple toe loop	Timothy Goebel	United States	1999 Skate America	
4Lz+3T	Quad lutz-triple toe loop	Jin Boyang	China	2015 Cup of China	
3A+4T	Triple Axel-quad toe loop	Mikhail Shaidorov	Kazakhstan	2024 Grand Prix de France	

== Technique ==
The toe loop is considered the simplest jump because not only do skaters use their toe-picks to execute it, but their hips are already facing the direction in which they will rotate. The toe loop is the easier jump to add multiple rotations to because the toe-assisted takeoff adds power to the jump, and because a skater can turn their body toward the assisting foot at takeoff, which slightly reduces the rotation required in the air. It is often added to more difficult jumps during combinations and is the most common second jump performed in combinations. It is also the most commonly attempted jump, as well as "the most commonly cheated on take off jump", or a jump in which the first rotation starts on the ice rather than in the air.

According to figure skating researcher Deborah King and her colleagues, the toe loop jump can be divided into four key events and three phases. The key events are: the toe-pick, or the moment the skater places their toepick into the ice; the take-off, or the last contact they make with the ice; the jump's maximum height; and the landing, or the moment the skater returns to the ice. The three phases are: the approach, which begins when the skater initiates the three turn entry into the jump and ends when they initiate the toe-pick; propulsion, which begins at the toe-pick and ends at take-off; and flight, which begins at take-off and ends at landing.

A skater initiates a toe loop done in isolation with a forward approach on the inside edge of the blade, then switches to a backward-facing position before its takeoff. The takeoff is accomplished from a back outside edge and with assistance from the toepick of the other foot. The jump is exited from the back outside edge of the same foot.

The skater may arrive on the back outside edge either as the back outside edge exiting from a forward three turn initiated on the inside edge, or from a forward three turn initiated on the outside edge and exited on the inside edge, followed by a change of foot. When the toe loop is done in combination, the back outside edge is the landing of the previous jump. After completing the three turn or previous jump, the skater reaches their free leg behind them and slightly outside the direction they are traveling, much like a pole-vaulter; this is the opposite foot they will use to land. Then they place the toepick in the ice with the free leg, and jump while pulling the take-off leg back and around and reaching forward and around with the arm and shoulder on the same side as the take-off leg, thus achieving the rotation. They draw their arms into the body for the desired number of rotations. At the time of take-off, the skater should face forward, with their free leg approximately parallel to their take-off foot and with their arms as close to their body as possible, which results in keeping their arms and legs close to their bodies and remaining in tight rotating positions at the moment of take-off. This helps attain faster rotational velocities in the air.

King and her colleagues, when they studied quadruple toe loop jumps at the 2002 Winter Olympics in Salt Lake City, Utah, counted 71 attempted quadruple toe loop jumps or quadruple toe-loop combination jumps. Of those, there were 33 quadruple toe loops performed not in combination with other jumps, 13 of which were landed cleanly, without a fall, without the skater touching a hand down on the ice, or without stepping out of the landing onto the other foot. They also found that "the most significant aspect" for completing toe loop jumps was the ability to increase rotational velocity while in the air. King also found that skaters who performed quadruple toe loops began to rotate their shoulders earlier than in triples, so that by the time they completed their toe-pick, their hips and shoulders were more aligned about their longitudinal axes. As a result, their hips and shoulders turned more uniformly during the propulsion phase of the jump. Vertical take-off velocity, however, was higher for both quadruple and triple toe loops, resulting in "higher jumps and more time in the air to complete the extra revolution for the quadruple toe-loop".

== Gallery ==
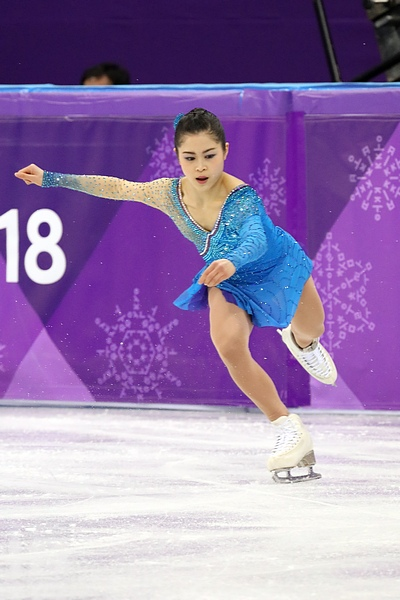
Satoko Miyahara begins a toe loop

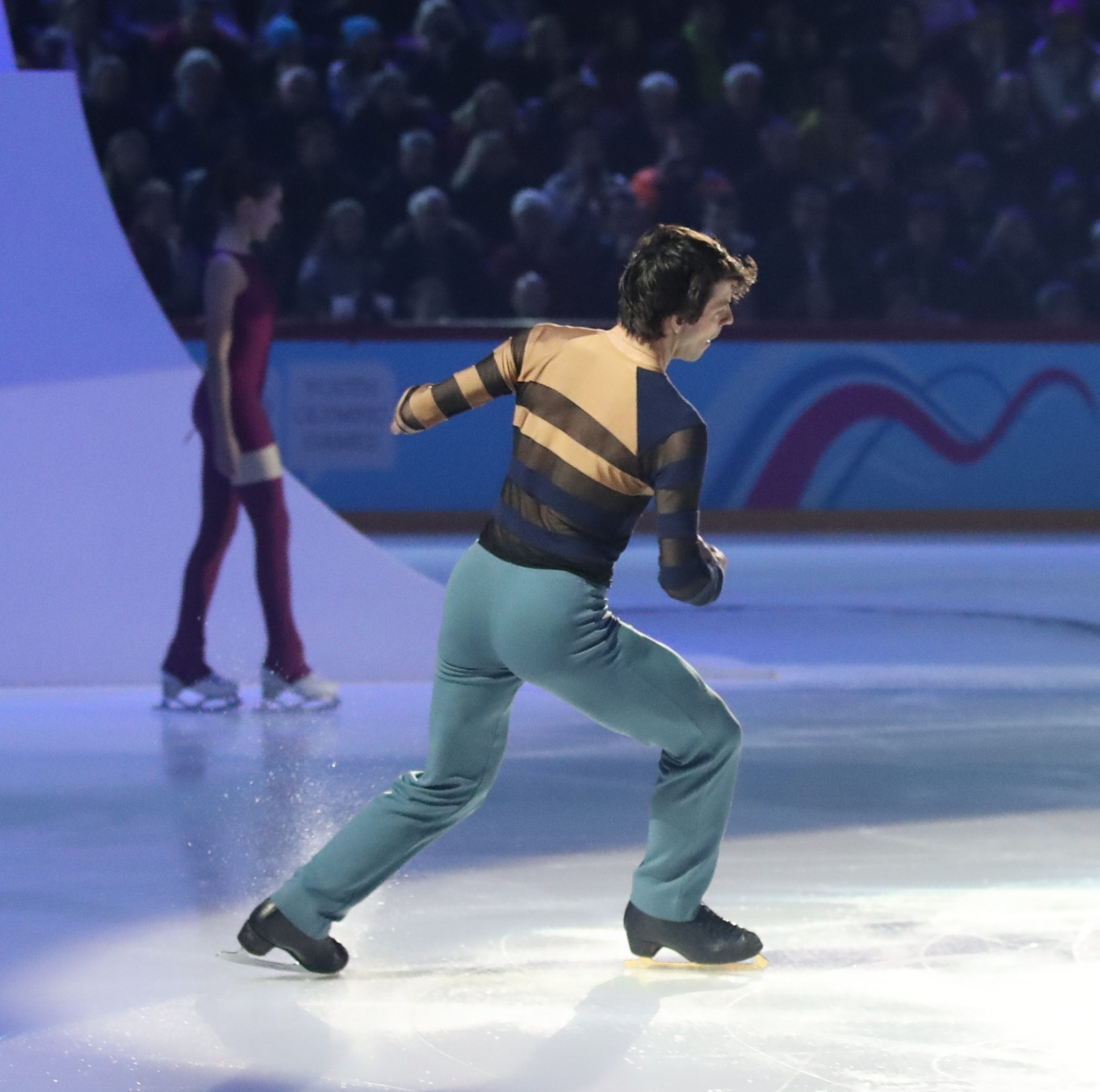
Stéphane Lambiel begins to take off by hitting the ice with his left toe pick

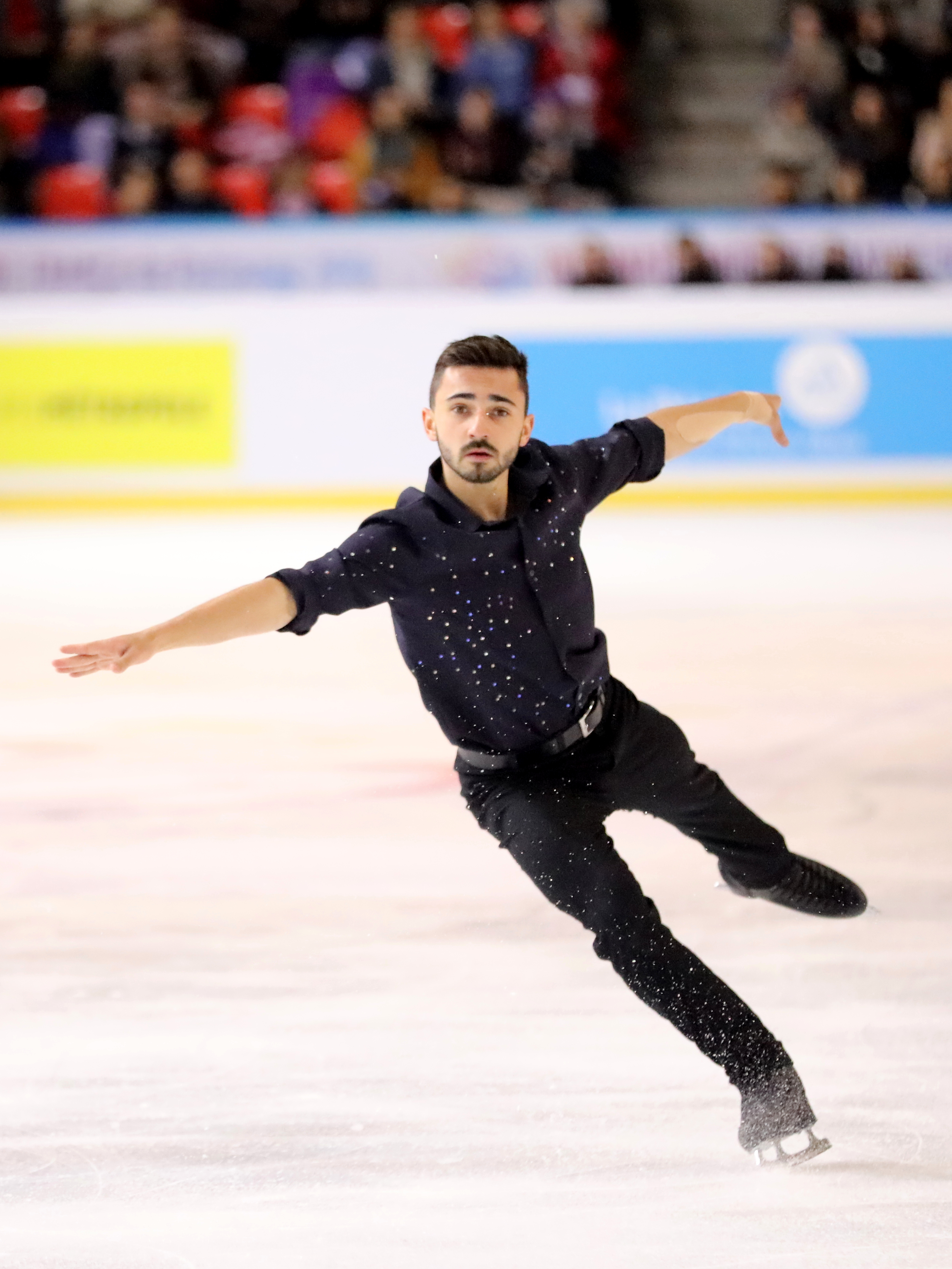
Kévin Aymoz landing

== Videos ==
Kazuki Tomono performing a quadruple toe loop - triple toe loop combination (real-time and slow motion)

Starr Andrews performing a triple toe loop (real-time and slow motion)

Adam Siao Him Fa performing a quadruple toe loop jump

== Works cited ==
- "ISU Figure Skating Media Guide 2025/26" (PDF). Lausanne, Switzerland: International Skating Union. 21 August 2025. Archived (PDF) from the original on 14 September 2025.
- Kestnbaum, Ellyn (2003). Culture on Ice: Figure Skating and Cultural Meaning. Middletown, Connecticut: Wesleyan University Press. ISBN 0819566411.
- King, Deborah; Smith, Sarah; Higginson, Brian; Muncasy, Barry; Scheirman, Gary (2004). "Characteristics of Triple and Quadruple Toe-Loops Performed during The Salt Lake City 2002 Winter Olympics". Sports Biomechanics. 3 (1): 109–123. doi:10.1080/14763140408522833.
