= Figure skating jumps =

ISU abbreviations
Eu	Euler
T	Toe loop
S	Salchow
Lo	Loop
F	Flip
Lz	Lutz
A	Axel

Figure skating jumps are an element of three competitive figure skating disciplines: men's singles, women's singles, and pair skating – but not ice dancing. (Note: Women were referred to as ladies in ISU regulations and communications until the 2021–22 season.) Jumping in figure skating is "relatively recent". They were originally individual compulsory figures, and sometimes special figures; many jumps were named after the skaters who invented them or from the figures from which they were developed. Jumps may be performed individually or in combination with each other.

It was not until the early part of the 20th century, well after the establishment of organized skating competitions, that jumps with the potential of being completed with multiple revolutions were invented, and when jumps were formally categorized. In the 1920s, Austrian skaters began to perform the first double jumps in practice. Skaters experimented with jumps, and by the end of the period, the modern repertoire of jumps had been developed. Jumps did not have a major role in free skating programs during international competitions until the 1930s. During the post-war period and into the 1950s and early 1960s, triple jumps became more common for both male and female skaters, and a full repertoire of two-revolution jumps had been fully developed. In the 1980s, men were expected to complete four or five difficult triple jumps, and women had to perform the easier triples. By the 1990s, after compulsory figures were removed from competitions, multi-revolution jumps became more important in figure skating.

The six most common jumps can be divided into two groups: toe jumps (the toe loop, the flip, and the Lutz) and edge jumps (the Salchow, the loop, and the Axel). The Euler jump, which was known as a half-loop before 2018, is an edge jump. Jumps are also classified by the number of revolutions. Pair skaters perform two types of jumps: side-by-side jumps, in which jumps are accomplished side by side and in unison, and throw jumps, in which the woman performs the jump when assisted and propelled by her partner.

According to the International Skating Union (ISU), jumps must have the following characteristics to earn the most points: they must have "very good height and very good length"; they must be executed effortlessly, including the rhythm demonstrated during jump combinations; and they must have good takeoffs and landings. The following are not required, but also taken into consideration: there must be steps executed before the beginning of the jump, or it must have either a creative or unexpected entry; the jump must match the music; and the skater must have, from the jump's takeoff to its landing, a "very good body position". A jump combination is executed when a skater's landing foot of the first jump is also the takeoff foot of the following jump. All jumps are considered in the order they are completed. Pair teams, both juniors and seniors, must perform one solo jump during their short programs.

The execution of a jump is divided into eight parts: the set-up, load, transition, pivot, takeoff, flight, landing, and exit. All jumps except the Axel and waltz jumps are taken off while skating backward; Axels and waltz jumps are entered into by skating forward. A skater's body absorbs up to 13–14 g-forces on landing a jump, which may contribute to overuse injuries and stress fractures. Factors such as angular momentum, the moment of inertia, angular acceleration, and the skater's center of mass determine if a jump is successfully completed. Skaters add variations or unusual entries and exits to jumps to increase difficulty.

== History ==
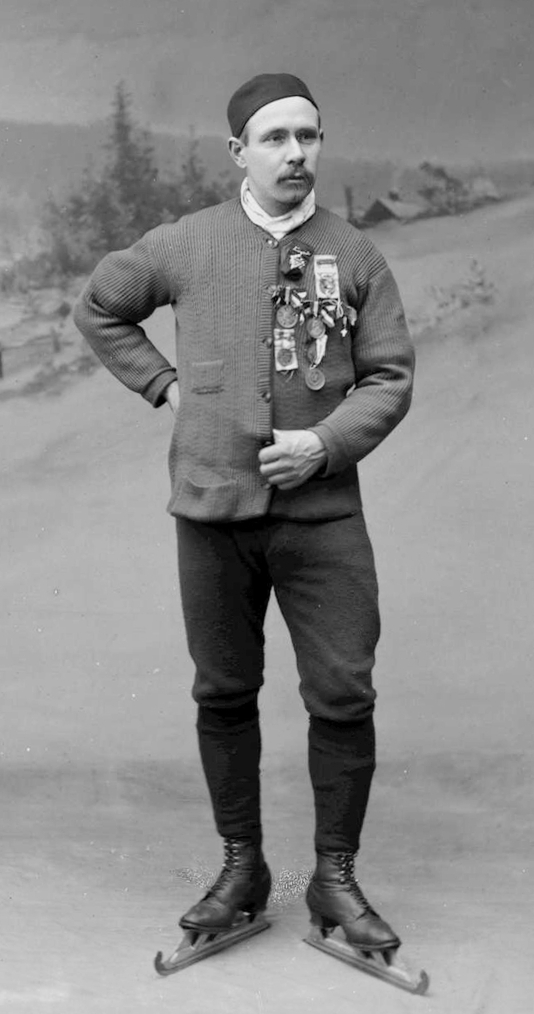
Norwegian figure skater Axel Paulsen created the Axel jump c. 1895.

According to figure skating historian James R. Hines, jumping in figure skating is "relatively recent". Jumps were viewed as "acrobatic tricks, not as a part of a skater's art" and "had no place" in the skating practices in England during the 19th century, although skaters experimented with jumps from the ice during the last 25 years of the 1800s. Hops, or jumps without rotations, were done for safety reasons, to avoid obstacles, such as hats, barrels, and tree logs, on natural ice. In 1881, Spuren Auf Dem Eise ("Tracing on the Ice"), "a monumental publication describing the state of skating in Vienna", briefly mentioned jumps, describing three jumps in two pages. Jumping on skates was a part of the athletic side of free skating and was considered inappropriate for female skaters.

Hines says free skating movements such as spirals, spread eagles, spins, and jumps were originally individual compulsory figures, and sometimes special figures. For example, Norwegian skater Axel Paulsen, whom Hines calls "progressive", performed the first jump in competition, the Axel, which was named after him, at the first international competition in 1882, as a special figure. Jumps were also related to their corresponding figure; for example, the loop jump. Other jumps, such as the Salchow and the Lutz, were named after the skaters who invented them.

It was not until the early part of the 20th century, well after the establishment of organized skating competitions, when jumps with the potential of being completed with multiple revolutions were invented and when jumps were formally categorized. These jumps became elements in athletic free skating programs, but they were not worth more points than no-revolution jumps and half-jumps. In the 1920s, Austrian skaters began to perform the first double jumps in practice and refine rotations in the Axel. Skaters experimented with jumps, and by the end of the period, the modern repertoire of jumps had been developed.

Jumps did not have a major role in free skating programs during international competitions until the 1930s. Athleticism in the sport increased between the world wars, especially by women like Norwegian world and Olympic champion Sonia Henie, who popularized short skirts which allowed female skaters to maneuver and perform jumps. When international competitions were interrupted by World War II, double jumps by both men and women had become commonplace, and all jumps, except for the Axel, were being doubled. According to writer Ellyn Kestnbaum the development of rotational technique required for Axels and double jumps continued, especially in the United States and Czechoslovakia. Post-war skaters, according to Hines, "pushed the envelope of jumping to extremes that skaters of the 1930s would not have thought possible". For example, world champion Felix Kasper from Austria was well known for his athletic jumps, which were the longest and highest in the history of figure skating. Hines reported that his Axel measured four feet high and 25 feet from takeoff to landing. Both men and women, including women skaters from Great Britain, were doubling Salchows and loops in their competition programs.

During the post-war period, American skater Dick Button, who "intentionally tried to bring a greater athleticism to men's skating", performed the first double Axel in competition in 1948 and the first triple jump, a triple loop, in 1952. Triple jumps, especially triple Salchows, became more common for male skaters during the 1950s and early 1960s, and female skaters, especially in North America, included a full repertoire of two-revolution jumps. By the late 1960s and early 1970s, men commonly performed triple Salchows and women regularly performed double Axels in competitions. Men would also include more difficult multi-revolution jumps like triple flips, Lutzes, and loops; women included triple Salchows and toe loops. In the 1980s men were expected to complete four or five difficult triple jumps, and women had to perform the easier triples such as the loop jump. By the 1990s, after compulsory figures were removed from competitions, multi-revolution jumps became more important in figure skating. According to Kestnbaum, jumps like the triple Lutz became more important during women's skating competitions. The last time a woman won a gold medal at the Olympics without a triple jump was Dorothy Hamill at the 1976 Olympics.

Progress in women's single skating in the 2010s is associated with the rapid increase in the technical complexity of programs. Alina Zagitova, representing Eteri Tutberidze's team from Russia, claimed victory at the 2018 Winter Olympics with a performance that approached the theoretical limit of a program without triple axels and quadruple jumps. Following this, the next generation of figure skaters, such as Rika Kihira from Japan and Alena Kostornaia (Tutberidze team), began setting records by incorporating the triple Axel into their programs. According to sports reporter Dvora Meyers, the "quad revolution in women's figure skating" began in 2018, when Kostornaia's teammate Alexandra Trusova began performing a quadruple Salchow when she was still competing as a junior. She became the first female skater to successfully land a quadruple Lutz, a quadruple flip, and a quadruple toe loop.

Figure skating edges

American skater Ilia Malinin is the first and only person to successfully land a fully rotated quadruple Axel in international competition, a jump widely regarded as the most difficult achieved in figure skating competition.

== Types of jumps ==
All listed figure skating jumps are landed backwards.

Classification and distinction of figure skating jumps
Abbr.	Jump	Toe assist	Change of foot	Change of edge	Change of curve	Change of direction	Takeoff edge	Landing edge
A	Axel	—	✓	—	—	✓	Forward outside	Outside (opposite foot)
Lz	Lutz	✓	✓	—	✓	—	Backward outside	Outside (opposite foot)
F	Flip	✓	✓	✓	—	—	Backward inside	Outside (opposite foot)
Lo	Loop	—	—	—	—	—	Backward outside	Outside (same foot)
S	Salchow	—	✓	✓	—	—	Backward inside	Outside (opposite foot)
T	Toe loop	✓	—	—	—	—	Backward outside	Outside (same foot)
Eu	Euler	—	✓	✓	—	—	Backward outside	Inside (opposite foot)

The six most common jumps can be divided into two groups: toe jumps (the toe loop, the flip, and the Lutz) and edge jumps (the Salchow, the loop, and the Axel). The ISU classifies jumps in order of their difficulty: the toe loop, the Salchow, the loop, the flip, the Lutz, and the Axel; and by the number of revolutions. All single jumps, except for the Axel, include one revolution; double jumps include two revolutions, and so on. More revolutions earn skaters more points. Jumps with more revolutions have increased in importance "as a measure of technical and athletic ability, with attention paid to clean takeoffs and landings". Pair skaters perform two types of jumps: side-by-side jumps, in which jumps are accomplished side by side and in unison, and throw jumps, in which the woman performs the jump when assisted and propelled by her partner. Quintuple jumps are not allowed in the short program.

Toe jumps tend to be higher than edge jumps because skaters press the toe pick of their skate into the ice on takeoff. Both feet are on the ice at the time of takeoff, and the toe-pick in the ice at takeoff acts as a pole vault. It is impossible to add a half-revolution to toe jumps. Skaters accomplish edge jumps by leaving the ice from any of their skates' four possible edges; lift is "achieved from the spring gained by straightening of a bent knee in combination with a swing of the free leg". They require precise rotational control of the skater's upper body, arms, and free leg, and of how well they lean into the takeoff edge. The preparation going into the jump and its takeoff, as well as controlling the rotation of the preparation and takeoff, must be precisely timed. When a skater executes an edge jump, they must extend their leg and use their arms more than when they execute toe jumps.

=== Euler ===
The Euler is an edge jump. It was known as the half-loop jump in International Skating Union (ISU) regulations prior to the 2018–2019 season, when the name was changed. Its invention has been attributed to both Carl and Gustav Euler, two Austrian brothers, as well as Swedish figure skater Per Thorén, after whom it is sometimes called the Thorén jump in Europe. The Euler is executed when a skater takes off from the back outside edge of one skate and lands on the opposite foot and edge. It serves as a way to put a skater on the correct edge in order to attempt a Salchow jump or a flip jump. It is permitted only in free skate and can be used once.

=== Toe loop ===
The toe loop jump is the simplest jump in figure skating. It was invented in the 1920s by American professional figure skater Bruce Mapes. In competition, the base value of a single toe loop is 0.40; the base value of a double toe loop is 1.30; the base value of a triple toe loop is 4.20; the base value of a quadruple toe loop is 9.50; and the base value of the quintuple toe loop is 14.00.

The toe loop is considered the simplest jump because not only do skaters use their toe-picks to execute it, but their hips are already facing the direction in which they will rotate. The toe loop is the easiest jump to add multiple rotations to because the toe-assisted takeoff adds power to the jump and because a skater can turn their body towards the assisting foot at takeoff, which slightly reduces the rotation needed in the air. It is often added to more difficult jumps during combinations, and is the most common second jump performed in combinations. It is also the most commonly attempted jump, as well as "the most commonly cheated on take off jump", or a jump in which the first rotation starts on the ice rather than in the air.

=== Salchow ===
The Salchow jump is an edge jump. It was named after its inventor, Ulrich Salchow, in 1909. The Salchow is accomplished with a takeoff from the back inside edge of one foot and a landing on the back outside edge of the opposite foot. It is "usually the first jump that skaters learn to double, and the first or second to triple". Timing is critical when performing the Salchow because both the takeoff and the landing must be on the backward edge. A Salchow is deemed cheated if the skate blade starts to turn forward before the takeoff, or if it has not turned completely backward when the skater lands back on the ice.

In competition, the base value of a single Salchow is 0.40; the base value of a double Salchow is 1.30; the base value of a triple Salchow is 4.30; the base value of a quadruple Salchow is 9.70; and the value of a quintuple Salchow is 14.00.

=== Loop ===
The loop jump is an edge jump. It was believed to be created by German figure skater Werner Rittberger, and is known as the Rittberger in Russian and German. It also gets its name from the shape the blade would leave on the ice if the skater performed the rotation without leaving the ice. According to U.S. Figure Skating, the loop jump is "the most fundamental of all the jumps". The skater executes it by taking off from the back outside edge of the skating foot, turning one rotation in the air, and landing on the back outside edge of the same foot. It is often performed as the second jump in a combination.

In competition, the base value of the single loop jump is 0.50; the base value of a double loop is 1.70; the base value of a triple loop is 4.90; the base value of a quadruple loop is 10.50; and the value of a quintuple loop jump is 14.00.

=== Flip ===
The ISU defines a flip jump as "a toe jump that takes off from a back inside edge and lands on the back outside edge of the opposite foot". It is executed with assistance from the toe of the free foot. In competition, the base value of a single flip is 0.50; the base value of a double flip is 1.80; the base value of a triple flip is 5.30; the base value of a quadruple flip is 11.00; and the base value of a quintuple flip is 14.00.

=== Lutz ===
The ISU defines the Lutz jump as "a toe-pick assisted jump with an entrance from a back outside edge and landing on the back outside edge of the opposite foot". It is the second-most difficult jump in figure skating and "probably the second-most famous jump after the Axel". It is named after figure skater Alois Lutz from Vienna, Austria, who is said to have first performed it in 1913, though historian Matthias Hampe did not find contemporary sources that referenced the jump before the 1920s, after Lutz's death. In competition, the base value of a single Lutz is 0.60; the base value of a double Lutz is 2.10; the base value of a triple Lutz is 5.90; the base value of a quadruple Lutz is 11.50; and the value of a quintuple Lutz is 14.00. A "cheated" Lutz jump without an outside edge is commonly called a "flutz".

=== Axel ===
The Axel jump, also called the Axel Paulsen jump for its creator, Norwegian figure skater Axel Paulsen, is an edge jump. It is figure skating's oldest and most difficult jump. The Axel jump is the most studied jump in figure skating. It is the only jump that begins with a forward takeoff, which makes it the easiest jump to identify. A double or triple Axel is required in the short program for both senior and junior men, and for senior women. An Axel-type jump is required in the free skating program for all levels of single skating. Junior pair skaters have the choice of performing either a double Axel or double loop in the short programs. Pair skaters can also choose, in their free skating program, a double Axel for one of their jumps in the jump combination or jump sequence.

The Axel has an extra half-rotation, which, as figure skating expert Hannah Robbins says, makes a triple Axel "more a quadruple jump than a triple". Sports reporter Nora Princiotti says, about the triple Axel, "It takes incredible strength and body control for a skater to get enough height and to get into the jump fast enough to complete all the rotations before landing with a strong enough base to absorb the force generated". According to American skater Mirai Nagasu, "Falling on the triple Axel is really brutal."

In competition, the base value of a single Axel is 1.10; the base value of a double Axel is 3.30; the base value of a triple Axel is 8.00; the base value of a quadruple Axel is 12.50. According to The New York Times, the triple Axel has become more common for male skaters to perform; as of 2026, Ilia Malinin from the U.S. is the only skater to successfully complete a quadruple Axel.

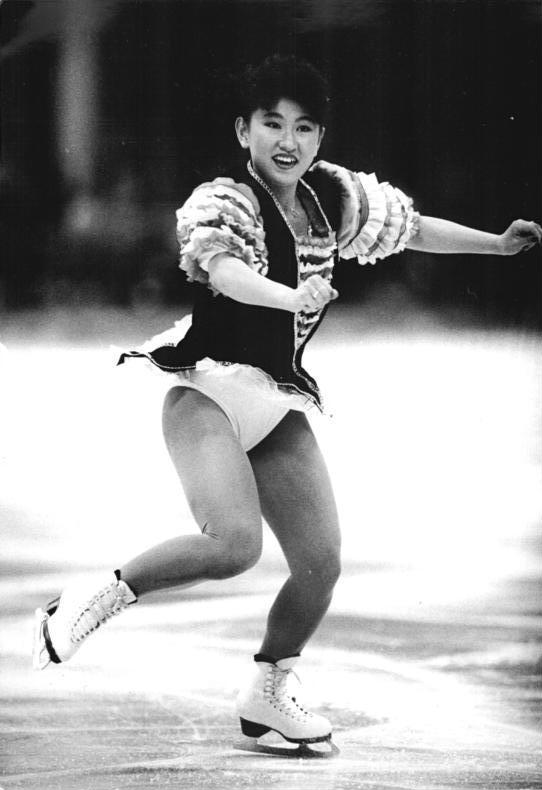
Japanese figure skater Midori Ito, first female skater to land a triple Axel, in 1989

== Rules and regulations ==
The ISU defines a jump element for both single skating and pair skating disciplines as "an individual jump, a jump combination or a jump sequence". Jumps are not allowed in ice dance.

Also according to the ISU, jumps must have the following characteristics to earn the most points: they must have "very good height and very good length"; they must be executed effortlessly, including the rhythm demonstrated during jump combinations; and they must have good takeoffs and landings. The following are not required, but also taken into consideration: there must be steps executed before the beginning of the jump, or it must have either a creative or unexpected entry; the jump must match the music; and the skater must have, from the jump's takeoff to its landing, a "very good body position".

A jump combination consists of "two jumps performed in an immediate and consecutive order". In a jump combination, the landing foot of the first jump must be the take-off foot of the second jump. The skater can also execute one full revolution on the ice between the jumps, meaning that their free foot can touch the ice with no weight transfer. An Euler jump can be included in a jump combination, although not during the short program, and only once during the free skating program.

A jump sequence consists of "two or three jumps in Single Skating or two jumps in Pair Skating of any number of revolutions in which the second and/or the third jump is an Axel type jump with a direct step from the landing curve of the first/second jump into the take-off curve of the Axel jump". The free foot can touch the ice, but there must be no weight transfer on it, and if the skater makes one full revolution between the jumps, the element continues to be deemed a jump sequence and receives its full value. Prior to the 2022-23 season, the skater received only 80% of the base value of the jumps executed in a jump sequence.

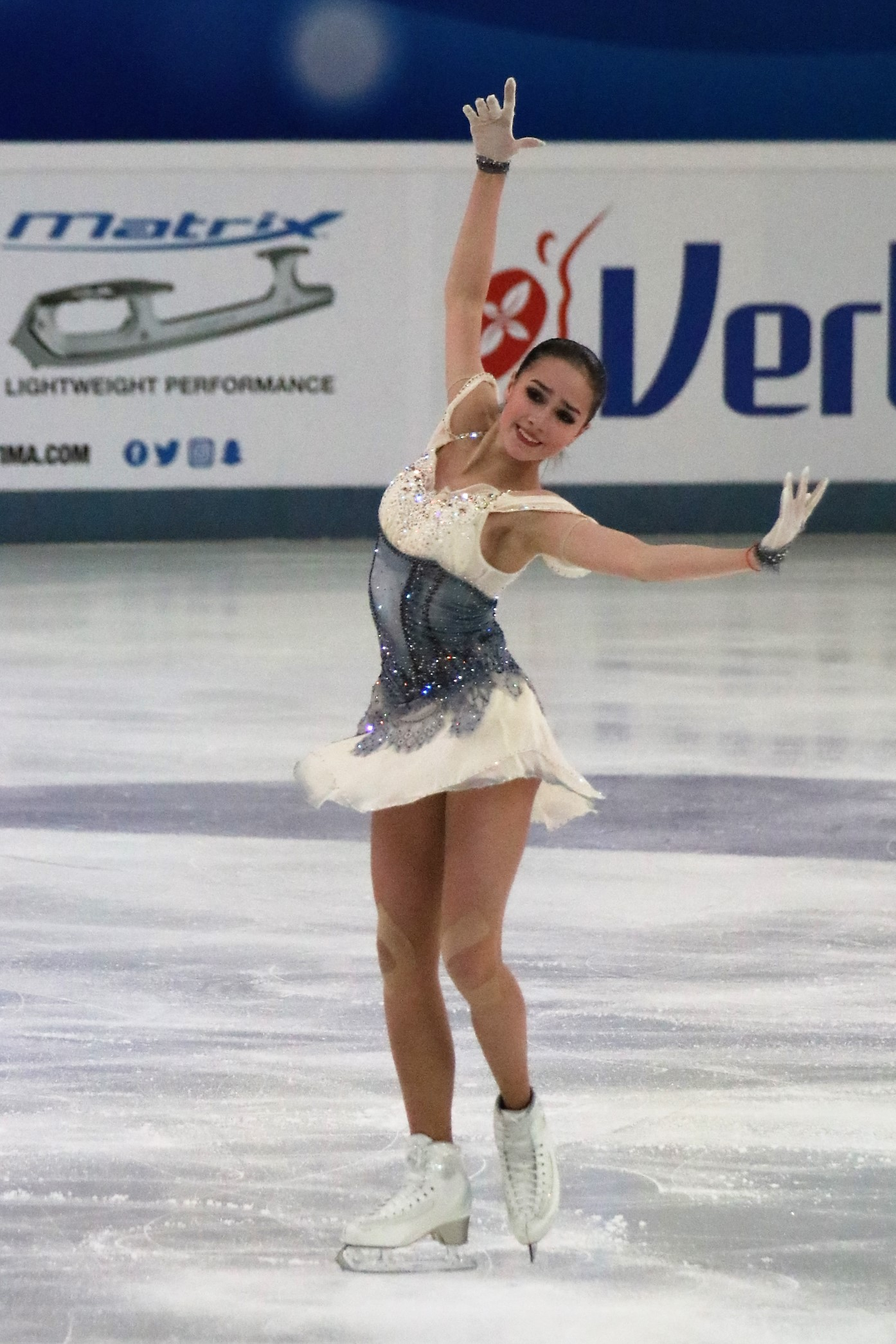
Russian figure skater Alina Zagitova, namesake of the "Zagitova Rule", in 2019

All jumps are considered in the order they are completed. If an extra jump or jumps are executed, the extra jump(s) not in accordance with requirements will have no value. The limitation on the number of jumps skaters can perform in their programs, called the "Zayak Rule" after American skater Elaine Zayak, has been in effect since 1983, after Zayak performed six triple jumps, four toe loop jumps, and two Salchows in her free skating program at the 1982 World Championships. Writer Ellyn Kestnbaum says the ISU established the rule "in order to encourage variety and balance rather than allowing a skater to rack up credit for demonstrating the same skill over and over". Kestnbaum also says that as rotations in jumps for both men and women have increased skaters have increased the difficulty of jumps by adding more difficult combinations and by adding difficult steps immediately before or after their jumps, resulting in "integrating the jumps more seamlessly into the flow of the program".

=== Single skating ===
Skaters earn extra points for executing jumps in the second half of their programs. In their short programs, they receive a bonus on their final jumping pass executed in the second half of the program. In their free skating programs, the bonus applies to the final three jumping passes, also if they execute the jumps during the second half of the program. This limitation has been called the "Zagitova Rule", named for Alina Zagitova from Russia, who won the gold medal at the 2018 Winter Olympics by "backloading" her free skating program, or placing all her jumps in the second half of the program in order to take advantage of the rule in place at the time that awarded a ten percent bonus to jumps performed during the second half of the program. Also starting in 2018, single skaters could repeat the same two triple or quadruple jumps only in their free skating programs. They could repeat four-revolution jumps only once, and the base value of the triple Axel and quadruple jumps were "reduced dramatically". As of 2022, jump sequences consisted of two or three jumps, but the second or third jump had to be an Axel. Jump sequences began to be counted for their full value and skaters could include single jumps in their step sequences as choreographic elements without incurring a penalty.

Junior men and women single skaters are not allowed to perform quadruple jumps in their short programs. In their short programs, both junior and senior skaters have to perform either a double or triple Axel jump, one triple or quadruple jump, and a jump combination. In their free-skating programs, both junior and senior skaters have to complete seven jump elements, one of which has to be an Axel-type jump.

=== Pair skating ===
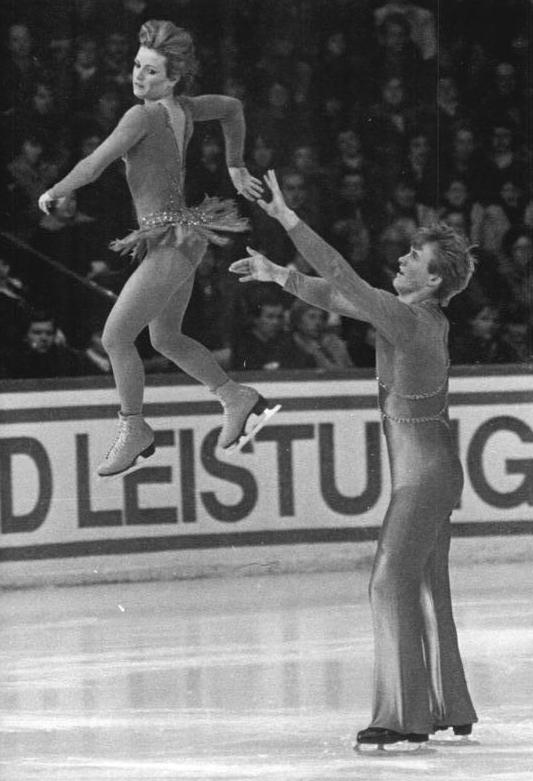
Canadian pair skaters Barbara Underhill and Paul Martini performing a throw jump in 1983

Pair teams, both juniors and seniors, must perform one solo jump during their short programs; it can include a double loop or double Axel for juniors, or any kind of double or triple jump for seniors. In the free skating program, for both juniors and seniors, skaters are limited to a maximum of one jump combination or sequence. A jump sequence consists of two or three jumps of any number of revolutions, in which the second and/or the third jump is an Axel type jump. Jumps during the short program that do not satisfy the requirements (including the wrong number of revolutions) will have no value. In the free skating program, when the partners perform an unequal number of revolutions as a solo jump, or as part of a jump combination or jump sequence, the jump with the smaller number of revolutions is counted. When they "definitely perform" different types of jumps, they receive no credit. In the free skating program, repeated jumps executed with over two revolutions "of the same name and number of revolutions" are not counted, although the two jumps may be the same within the same jump combination or jump sequence. The ISU also states, "Jumps are considered in the order of their combination".

Throw jumps are "partner-assisted jumps in which the Woman is thrown into the air by the Man on the takeoff and lands without assistance from her partner on a backward outside edge". Skate Canada says, "The male partner assists the female into flight." The types of throw jumps include: the throw Axel, the throw Salchow, the throw toe loop, the throw loop, the throw flip, and the throw Lutz. The throw triple Axel is a difficult throw to accomplish because the woman must perform three-and-one-half revolutions after being thrown by the man, a half-revolution more than other triple jumps, and because it requires a forward takeoff. The speed of the team's entry into the throw jump and the number of rotations performed increases its difficulty, as well as the height and/or distance they create. Pair teams must perform one throw jump during their short programs; senior teams can perform any double or triple throw jump, and junior teams must perform a double or triple toe loop, or a double or triple flip or Lutz. If a throw jump in the short program is not done correctly, including if it has the wrong number of revolutions, it receives no value. Both juniors and seniors must complete a maximum of two different throw jumps in their free skating programs.

== Execution ==
According to Kestbaum, jumps are divided into eight parts: the set-up, load, transition, pivot, takeoff, flight, landing, and exit. All jumps, except for the Axel, are taken off while skating backward; Axels are entered into by skating forward. Skaters travel in three directions simultaneously while executing a jump: vertically (up off the ice and back down); horizontally (continuing along the direction of travel before leaving the ice); and around. They travel in an up and across, arc-like path while executing a jump, much like the projectile motion of a pole-vaulter. A jump's height is determined by vertical velocity and its length is determined by vertical and horizontal velocity. The trajectory of the jump is established during takeoff, so the shape of the arc cannot be changed once a skater is in the air. Their body absorbs up to 13–14 g-forces each time they land from a jump, which sports researchers Lee Cabell and Erica Bateman say contributes to overuse injuries and stress fractures.

Skaters add variations or unusual entries and exits to jumps to increase difficulty. For example, they will perform a jump with one or both arms overhead or extended at the hips, demonstrating their ability to generate rotation from the takeoff edge and their entire body, rather than relying solely on their arms. It also demonstrates their back strength and technical ability to complete the rotation without relying on their arms. Unusual entries into jumps demonstrate that skaters are able to control both the jump and, with little preparation, the transition from the previous move to the jump. Skaters rotate more quickly when their arms are pulled in tightly to their bodies, which requires strength to keep their arms from being pulled away from their bodies as they rotate.

According to Deborah King and her colleagues from Ithaca College, there are basic physics common to all jumps, regardless of the skating techniques required to execute them. Factors such as angular momentum, the moment of inertia, angular acceleration, and the skater's center of mass determine if a jump is successfully completed. Unlike jumping from dry land, which is fundamentally a linear movement, jumping on the ice is more complicated because of angular momentum. For example, most jumps involve rotation. Scientist James Richards from the University of Delaware says successful jumps depend upon "how much angular momentum do you leave the ice with, how small can you make your moment of inertia in the air, and how much time you can spend in the air". Richards found that a skater tends to spend the same amount of time in the air when performing triple and quadruple jumps, but their angular momentum at the start of triples and quadruples is slightly higher than it is for double jumps. The key to completing higher-rotation jumps is controlling the moment of inertia. Richards also found that many skaters, although they were able to gain the necessary angular momentum for takeoff, had difficulty gaining enough rotational speed to complete the jump. King and her colleagues agree that skaters must be in the air long enough, have enough jump height to complete the required revolutions, and gain enough vertical velocity as they jump off the ice. However, different jumps require different patterns of movement. Skaters performing quadruple jumps tend to be in the air longer and have more rotational speed. King also found that most skaters "actually tended to skate slower into their quads as compared to their triples", although the differences in the speed at which they approached triples and quadruples were small. King conjectured that slowing their approach into the jumps was due to skaters' "confidence and a feeling of control and timing for the jump", rather than any difference in how they executed them. Vertical takeoff velocity, however, was higher for both quadruple and triple toe loops, resulting in "higher jumps and more time in the air to complete the extra revolution for the quadruple toe-loop". As Tanya Lewis of Scientific American puts it, executing quadruple jumps, which as of 2022, has become more common in both male and female single skating competitions, requires "exquisite strength, speed and grace".

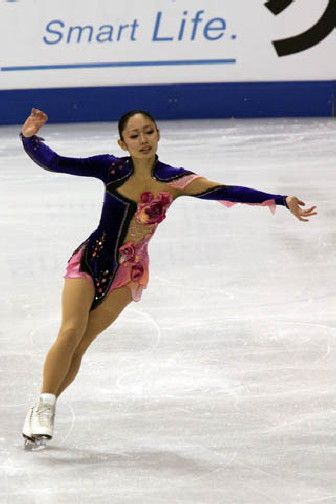
Japanese figure skater Miki Ando, first female skater to land a quadruple jump, in 2009

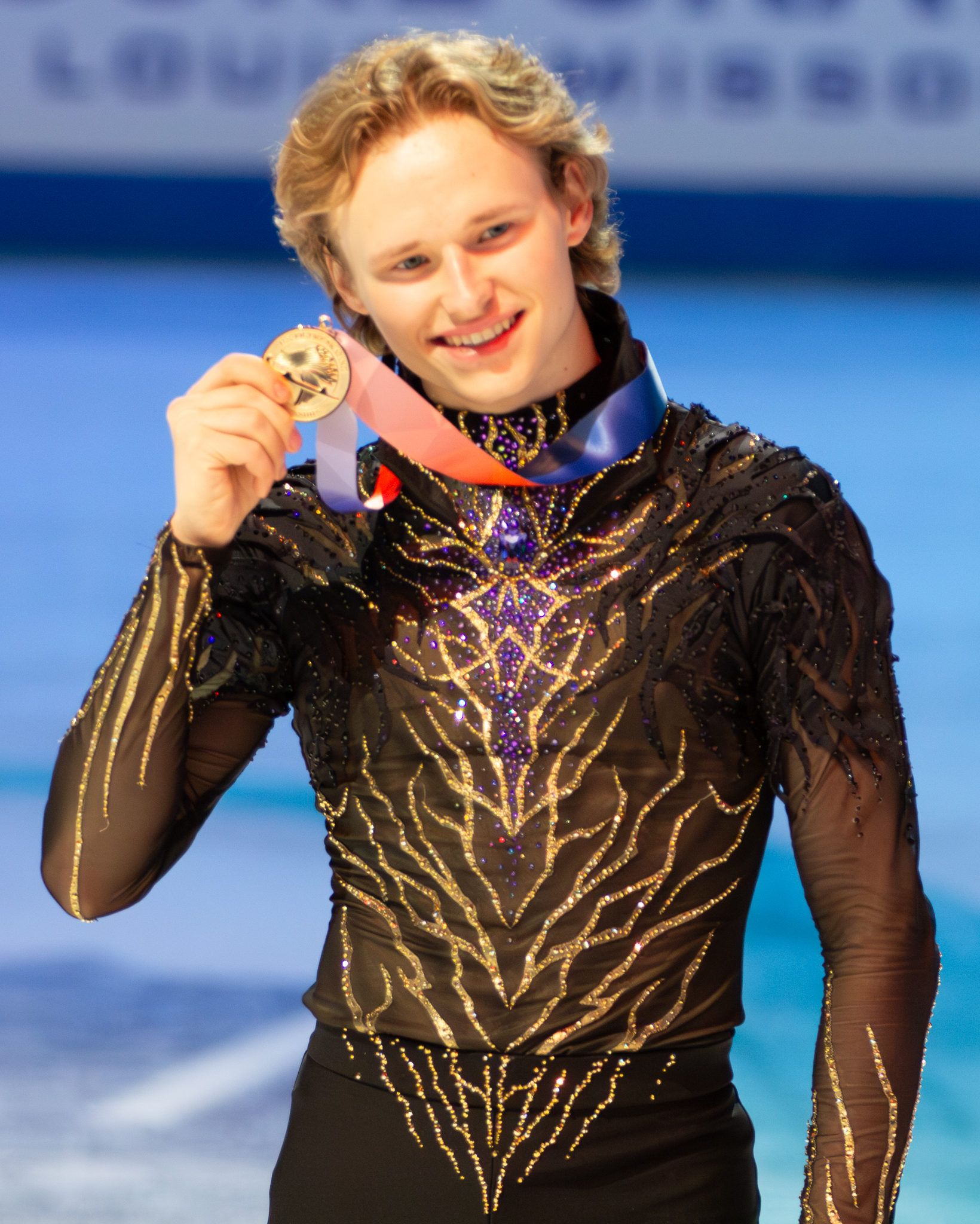
American Ilia Malinin, the first skater to successfully complete a quad Axel in competition, in 2026

For example, a skater could successfully complete a jump by making small changes to their arm position partway through the rotation, and a small bend in the hips and knees allows a skater "to land with a lower center of mass than they started with, perhaps seeking out a few precious degrees of rotation and a better body position for landing". When they execute a toe jump, they must use their skate's toe pick to complete a pole-vaulting-type motion off the ice, which along with extra horizontal speed, helps them store more energy in their leg. As they rotate over their leg, their horizontal motion converts into tangential velocity. King, who believes quintuple jumps are mathematically possible, says that in order to execute more rotations, they could improve their rotational momentum as they execute their footwork or approach into their takeoff, creating torque about the rotating axis as they come off the ice. She also says that if skaters can increase their rotational momentum while "still exploding upward" they can rotate faster and increase the number of revolutions they perform. Sports writer Dvora Meyers, reporting on Russian coaching techniques, says female skaters executing more quadruple jumps in competition use what experts call pre-rotation, or the practice of twisting their upper bodies before they take off from the ice, which allows them to complete four revolutions before landing. Meyers also says the technique depends on the skater's being small, light, and young, and that it puts more strain on the back because they do not use as much leg strength. As a skater ages and goes through puberty, however, they tend not to be able to execute quadruple jumps because "the technique wasn't sound to start with". They also tend to retire before the age of 18 due to the increase in back injuries.

Since the tendency of an edge is toward the center of the circle created by that edge, a skater's upper body, arms, and free leg also have a tendency to be pulled along by the force of the edge. If the upper body, arms, and free leg are allowed to follow passively, they will eventually overtake the edge's rotational edge and will rotate faster, a principle that is also used to create faster spins. The inherent force of the edge and the force generated by a skater's upper body, arms, and free leg tend to increase rotation, so successful jumping requires precise control of these forces. Leaning into the curvature of the edge is how skaters regulate the edge's inherent angular momentum. Their upper body, arms, and free leg are controlled by what happens at the time of preparation for the jump and its takeoff, which are designed to produce the correct amount of rotation on the takeoff. If they do not have enough rotation, they will not be at the correct position at the takeoff; if they rotate too much, their upper body will not be high enough in the air. Skaters must keep track of the many different movements and body positions, as well as the timing of those movements relative to each other and to the jump itself, which requires hours of practice but once mastered, becomes natural.

The number of possible combinations jumps is limitless; if a turn or change of feet is permitted between combination jumps, any number of sequences is possible, although if the landing of one jump is the takeoff of the next, as is the case in loop combinations, how the skater lands will dictate the possibilities going into subsequent jumps. Rotational momentum tends to increase during combination jumps, so skaters should control rotation at the landing of each jump; if a skater does not control rotation, they will over-rotate on subsequent jumps and probably fall. The way skaters control rotation differs depending on the nature of the landing and takeoff edges, and the way they use their arms, which regulate their shoulders and upper body position, and their free leg, which dictates the positioning of their hips. If the landing on one jump leads directly into the takeoff of the jump that follows it, the bend on the landing leg of the first jump serves as preparation for the spring of the takeoff of the subsequent jump. If some time elapses between the completion of the first jump and the takeoff of the subsequent one, or if a series of movements serves as preparation for the subsequent jump, the leg bend for the spring can be separated from the bend of the landing leg.

== History of first jumps ==
The following table lists first recorded jumps in competition for which there is secure information.

Jump	Abbr.	Men	Year	Women	Year	Ref.
Single toe loop	1T	(United States) Bruce Mapes	1920s	n/a		
Single Salchow	1S	(Sweden) Ulrich Salchow	1909	(Germany) Margarete Klebe	1917	
Single loop	1Lo	(Germany) Werner Rittberger	1910	n/a		
Single Lutz	1Lz	(Austria) Alois Lutz	1913	n/a		
Single Axel	1A	(Norway) Axel Paulsen (Note: Outside of competition)	1882	(Norway) Sonja Henie	1920s	
Double Salchow	2S	n/a	1920s	(United Kingdom) Cecilia Colledge	1930s	
Double Lutz	2Lz	n/a		(Czech Republic) Alena Vrzáňová (Note: According to https://olympics.com/en/athletes/jacqueline-du-bief, Jacqueline du Bief, in 1952, was the first woman to do a double Lutz in international competition, but it was a controversial win, and that she later wrote in her book Thin Ice, that American Sonya Klopfer deserved the title.)	1949	
Double Axel	2A	(United States) Dick Button	1948	(United States) Carol Heiss	1953	
Triple toe loop	3T	(United States) Thomas Litz	1964	n/a		
Triple Salchow	3S	(United States) Ronnie Robertson	1955	(Canada) Petra Burka (Note: According to the 2025–26 ISU Media Guide, Petra Burka can be credited as the first woman to do a triple Salchow, but a report from the 1961 European Championships noted that Helli Sengstschmid (AUT) and Jana Mrazkova (CZE) landed a triple Salchow then.)	1962	
Triple loop	3Lo	(United States) Dick Button	1952	(East Germany) Gabriele Seyfert	1968	
Triple flip	3F	n/a		(East Germany) Katarina Witt (West Germany) Manuela Ruben	1981	
Triple Lutz	3Lz	(Canada) Donald Jackson	1962	(Switzerland) Denise Biellmann	1978	
Triple Axel	3A	(Canada) Vern Taylor	1978	(Japan) Midori Ito	1988	
Quadruple toe loop	4T	(Canada) Kurt Browning	1988	(Russia) Alexandra Trusova	2018	
Quadruple Salchow	4S	(United States) Timothy Goebel	1998	(Japan) Miki Ando	2002	
Quadruple loop	4Lo	(Japan) Yuzuru Hanyu	2016	(Russia) Adelia Petrosian (Note: Domestic competition.)	2022	
Quadruple flip	4F	(Japan) Shoma Uno	2016	(Russia) Alexandra Trusova	2019	
Quadruple Lutz	4Lz	(United States) Brandon Mroz	2011	(Russia) Alexandra Trusova	2018	
Quadruple Axel	4A	(United States) Ilia Malinin	2022	none ratified		

== See also ==
- Quadruple jump

== Works cited ==
- Cabell, Lee; Bateman, Erica (2018). "Biomechanics in Figure Skating". In Vescovi, Jason D.; VanHeest, Jaci L. (eds.). The Science of Figure Skating. New York: Routledge. pp. 13–34. ISBN 978-1-138-22986-0.
- "Communication No. 2707: Single & Pair Skating Scale of Values" (PDF). International Skating Union. 16 May 2025. Archived from the original (PDF) on 16 May 2025.
- Hines, James R. (2006). Figure Skating: A History. Urbana, Illinois: University of Illinois Press. ISBN 978-0-252-07286-4.
- Hines, James R. (2011). Historical Dictionary of Figure Skating. Lanham, Maryland: Scarecrow Press. ISBN 978-0-8108-6859-5.
- "Identifying Jumps" (PDF). U.S. Figure Skating. n.d. Archived from the original (PDF) on 12 July 2017.
- "ISU Figure Skating Media Guide 2025/26" (PDF). International Skating Union. Lausanne, Switzerland. 21 August 2025. Archived (PDF) from the original on 14 September 2025.
- "ISU Technical Panel Handbook Pair Skating 2025-2026" (PDF). International Skating Union. 25 July 2025. Archived (PDF) from the original on 12 August 2025.
- "ISU Technical Panel Handbook Single Skating 2025-2026" (PDF). International Skating Union. 25 July 2025. Archived (PDF) from the original on 12 August 2025.
- Kestnbaum, Ellyn (2003). Culture on Ice: Figure Skating and Cultural Meaning. Middletown, Connecticut: Wesleyan University Press. ISBN 0819566411.
- King, Deborah; Smith, Sarah; Higginson, Brian; Muncasy, Barry; Scheirman, Gary (2004). "Characteristics of Triple and Quadruple Toe-Loops Performed during The Salt Lake City 2002 Winter Olympics". Sports Biomechanics. 3 (1): 109–123. doi:10.1080/14763140408522833.
- Petkevich, John Misha (1988). Sports Illustrated Figure Skating: Championship Techniques (1st ed.). New York: Sports Illustrated. ISBN 978-1-4616-6440-6. OCLC 815289537.
- "Special Regulations & Technical Rules – Single & Pair Skating and Ice Dance 2024" (PDF). International Skating Union. June 2024. Archived (PDF) from the original on 9 November 2024.
- Stevens, Ryan (2023). Technical Merit: A History of Figure Skating Jumps. Halifax, Nova Scotia: Independently published. ISBN 979-8374044348.
