= Euler jump =

Figure skating jump, used as transition in a jump sequence

Figure skating element
- Element name: Euler jump
- Scoring abbreviation: Eu
- Element type: Jump
- Take-off edge: Back outside
- Landing edge: Back inside

The Euler is an edge jump in figure skating. The Euler jump was known as the half loop jump in International Skating Union (ISU) regulations prior to the 2018/19 season when the name was changed. Its invention has been attributed to both Carl and Gustav Euler, two Austrian brothers who won the men's pairs competition at the 1900 European Championships, as well as to Swedish figure skater Per Thorén, who won a bronze medal at the 1908 Olympics in London. It is thus also called the Thorén jump in Europe. It is also a jump used in artistic roller skating.

Lara Naki Gutmann performing a triple Lutz jump – Euler – triple Salchow jump combination (real-time and slow motion)

According to U.S. Figure Skating, two benefits of the name change are that it simplifies the notation system for judges and makes it easier for skaters to attempt three-jump combinations, even if single loop jumps are already a planned part of their programs or if they accidentally pop out of a previous loop jump. An Euler is considered a non-listed jump, has no value when used during both a jump combination and a jump sequence between two jumps, and is not counted in the number of jumps allowed during a jump combination. It is allowed to be excuted only once during the free skating program, and cannot be included in both the jump combination and the jump sequence during the short program. According to the ISU, "After the execution of an Euler, no change of foot before the next jump is allowed".

== Works cited ==
- "Special Regulations & Technical Rules – Single & Pair Skating and Ice Dance 2024" (PDF). International Skating Union. June 2024. Archived (PDF) from the original on 9 November 2024.
