= Bruce Mapes =

American figure skater

Bruce Mapes (August 16, 1901 – February 18, 1961) was an American figure skater from the early 1900s. In 1913, the jump now known today as the flip became known by his last name, but it is not known for certain if he was the inventor. In 1920, Mapes invented the toe loop, which is now called a Mapes in artistic roller skating. Later he was a lighting director for NBC in New York City and resided in Fair Haven, New Jersey at the time of his death.
