= Flip jump =

Figure skating jump

Figure skating element
- Element name: Flip jump
- Scoring abbreviation: F
- Element type: Jump
- Take-off edge: Back inside
- Landing edge: Back outside

The flip jump (also called the flip, and formerly the toe salchow) is a figure skating jump. The International Skating Union (ISU) defines a flip jump as "a toe jump that takes off from a back inside edge and lands on the back outside edge of the opposite foot". It is executed with assistance from the toe of the free foot.

== History ==
The origin of the flip jump is unknown, although American professional figure skater Bruce Mapes might have created it. Writer Ellyn Kestnbaum calls the jump "somewhat trickier than the loop for most skaters. considerably more so than the salchow or toe loop", because of its unstable inside edge and the precision required to align and time the jump's vault from the toepick. As a consequence, quadruple flip jumps are, as ESPN puts it, "rare". Kestnbaum also states that it is crucial that the skater's edge not be too deep, but instead almost forms a straight line.

Variations of the flip jump include the half flip and the split flip. The half flip is often used as a simple transitional movement during a step sequence and as a takeoff for other half jumps. A split flip is a single flip jump with a split position at the peak of the skater's position in the air. There is no record of the first male skater to perform the triple flip.

In competitions, the base value of a single flip is 0.50; the base value of a double flip is 1.80; the base value of a triple flip is 5.30; the base value of a quadruple flip is 11.00; and the base value of a quintuple flip is 14.

=== Firsts ===
Abbr.	Jump element	Skater	Nation	Event	Ref.
3F	Triple flip (women's)	Katarina Witt	East Germany	1981 European Championships	
3F	Triple flip (women's)	Manuela Ruben	Germany	1981 European Championships	
4F	Quadruple flip (men's)	Shoma Uno	Japan	2016 Team Challenge Cup	
4F	Quadruple flip (women's)	Alexandra Trusova	Russia	2019–20 Grand Prix of Figure Skating Final	

== Gallery ==
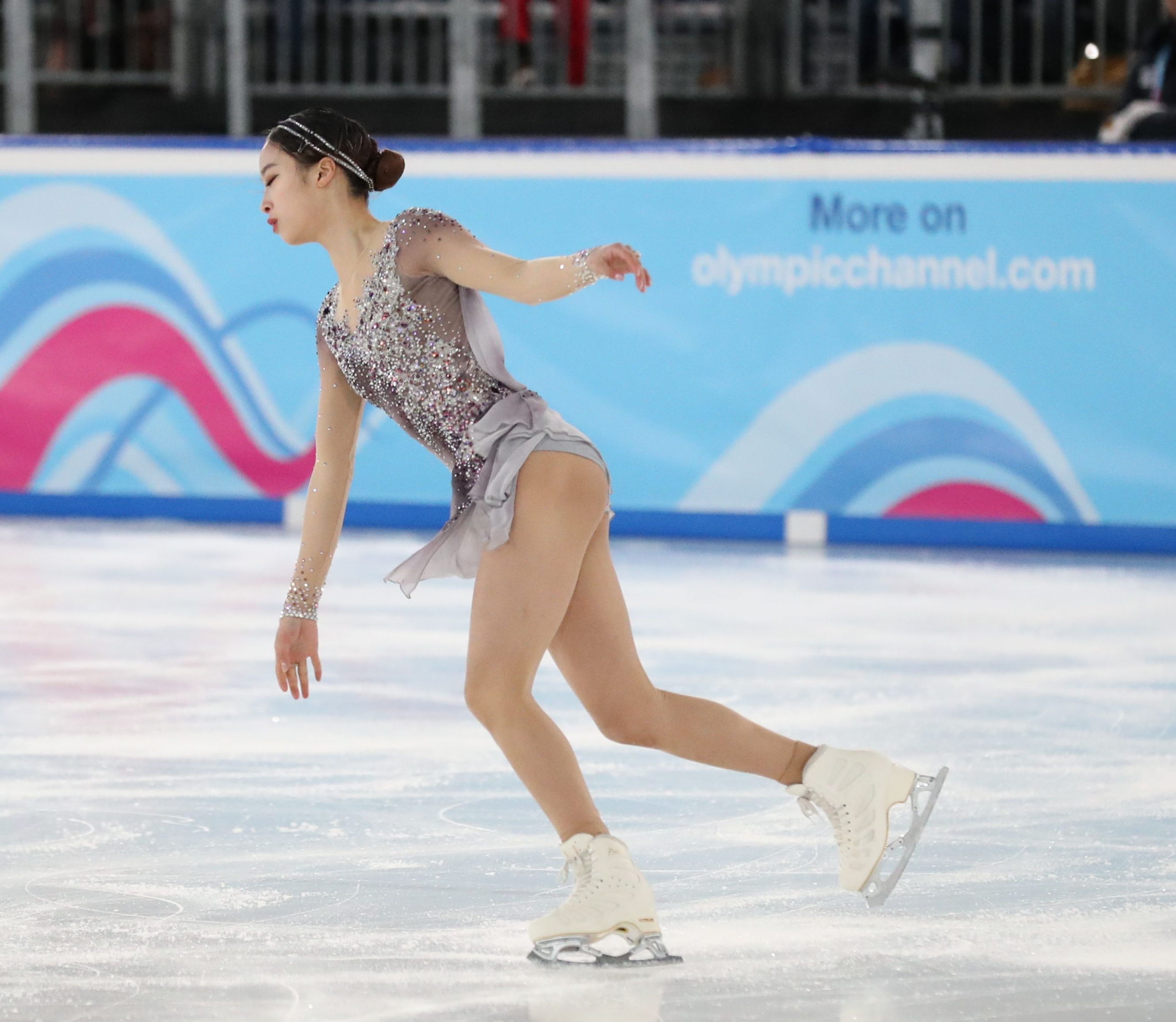
You Young begins the flip jump with her left foot on the inside edge and her right toe pick about to hit the ice

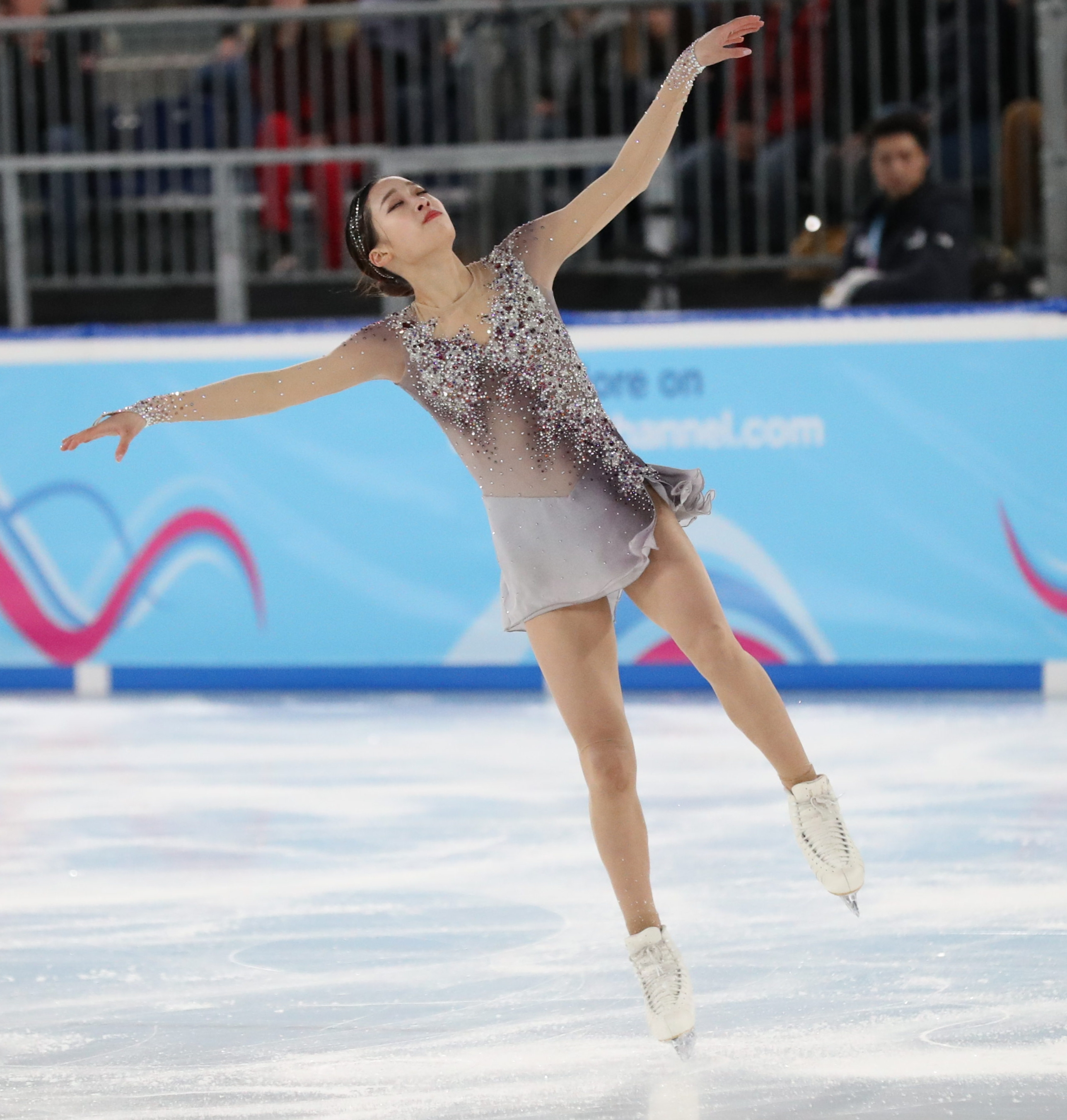
You Young begins to take off the ice

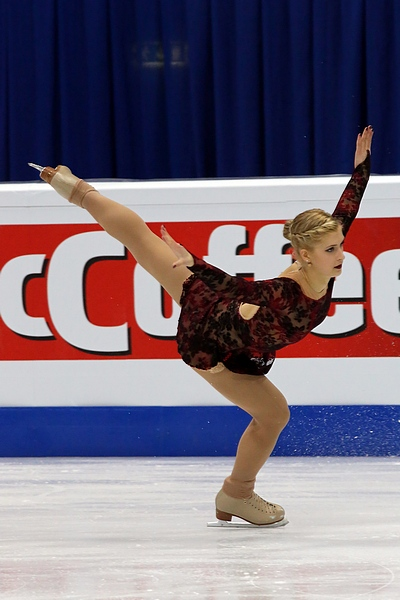
Eliška Březinová landing

== Videos ==
Liam Kapeikis performing a triple flip jump (real-time and slow motion)

Corey Circelli performing a triple flip jump (real-time and slow motion)

Kim Chae-yeon performing a triple flip - double toe loop jump - double loop jump combination (real-time and slow motion)

Jason Brown performing a triple flip jump

== Works cited ==
- "ISU Figure Skating Media Guide 2025/26" (PDF). Lausanne, Switzerland: International Skating Union. 21 August 2025. Archived (PDF) from the original on 14 September 2025.
- Kestnbaum, Ellyn (2003). Culture on Ice: Figure Skating and Cultural Meaning. Middletown, Connecticut: Wesleyan University Press. ISBN 0819566411.
