= Loop jump =

Figure skating jump

Figure skating element
- Element name: Loop Jump
- Alternative name: Rittberger Jump
- Scoring abbreviation: Lo
- Element type: Jump
- Take-off edge: Back Outside
- Landing edge: Back Outside
- Inventor: Werner Rittberger

The loop jump is an edge jump in the sport of figure skating. The skater executes it by taking off from the back outside edge of the skating foot, turning one or more rotations in the air, and landing on the back outside edge of the same foot. It is often performed as the second jump in a combination.

== History ==
The loop jump was created by German figure skater Werner Rittberger, and is often called the Rittberger in Europe. According to U.S. Figure Skating, the loop jump is "the most fundamental of all the jumps". According to writer Ellyn Kestnbaum, the jump also gets its name from the shape the blade would leave on the ice if the skater performed the rotation without leaving the ice. In competitions, the base value of the single loop jump is 0.50; the base value of a double loop is 1.70; the base value of a triple loop is 4.90; the base value of a quadruple loop is 10.50, and the base value of a quintuple loop is 14.

=== Firsts ===
Abbr.	Jump element	Skater	Nation	Event	Ref.
3Lo	Triple loop (men's)	Dick Button	United States	1952 Winter Olympics	
3Lo	Triple loop (women's)	Gabriele Seyfert	East Germany	1968 skating competition	
4Lo	Quadruple loop (men's)	Yuzuru Hanyu	Japan	2016 CS Autumn Classic International	

Adeliia Petrosian remains the only woman to land/attempt a quadruple loop in a competition, but as she landed it in a domestic competition is not counted as ratified attempt by the ISU.

== Execution ==
The loop jump is an edge jump. The skater executes it by taking off from the back outside edge of the skating foot, turning one or more rotations in the air, and landing on the back outside edge of the same foot. Atlantic Monthly, in its description of all jumps, states, "An easy way to remember this jump is that it's basically a toe loop without the assist of the toe pick". The jump is usually approached directly from back crossovers, which allows the skater to establish their upper body position while gliding backwards on their right outside edge before springing into the air. The loop is more difficult than the toe loop and Salchow because the free leg is already crossed at takeoff, so the rotation begins from the edge of the skating foot and the upper body. The coordination and weight shift do not need to be exact while performing the loop, so many skaters consider it an easier jump than the flip and Lutz. It is often performed as the second jump in a combination because it takes off from the same edge as "the standard jump landing". Kestnbaum states, "The fact that the free leg remains in front makes both controlling the landing of the first jump and generating the lift and rotation for the second more difficult than when a toe loop is used as the second jump". A loop jump is considered incorrectly done if the takeoff is two-footed, meaning that the free foot does not leave the ice before the takeoff.

== Gallery ==
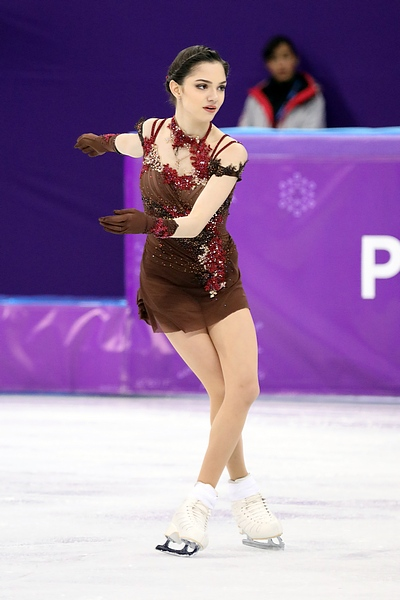
Evgenia Medvedeva begins to set up a loop jump

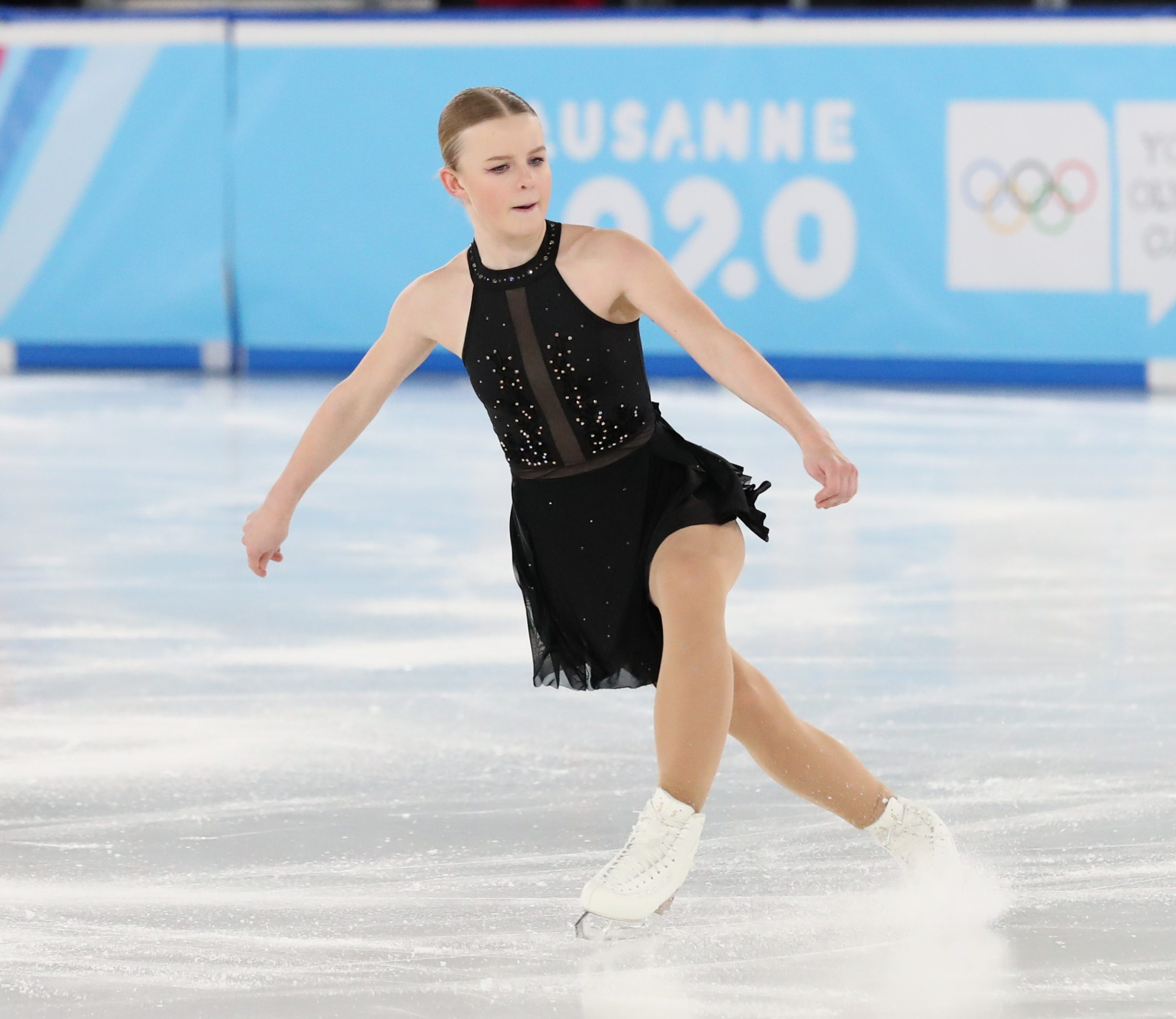
Nella Pelkonen bends her knees in preparation to jump

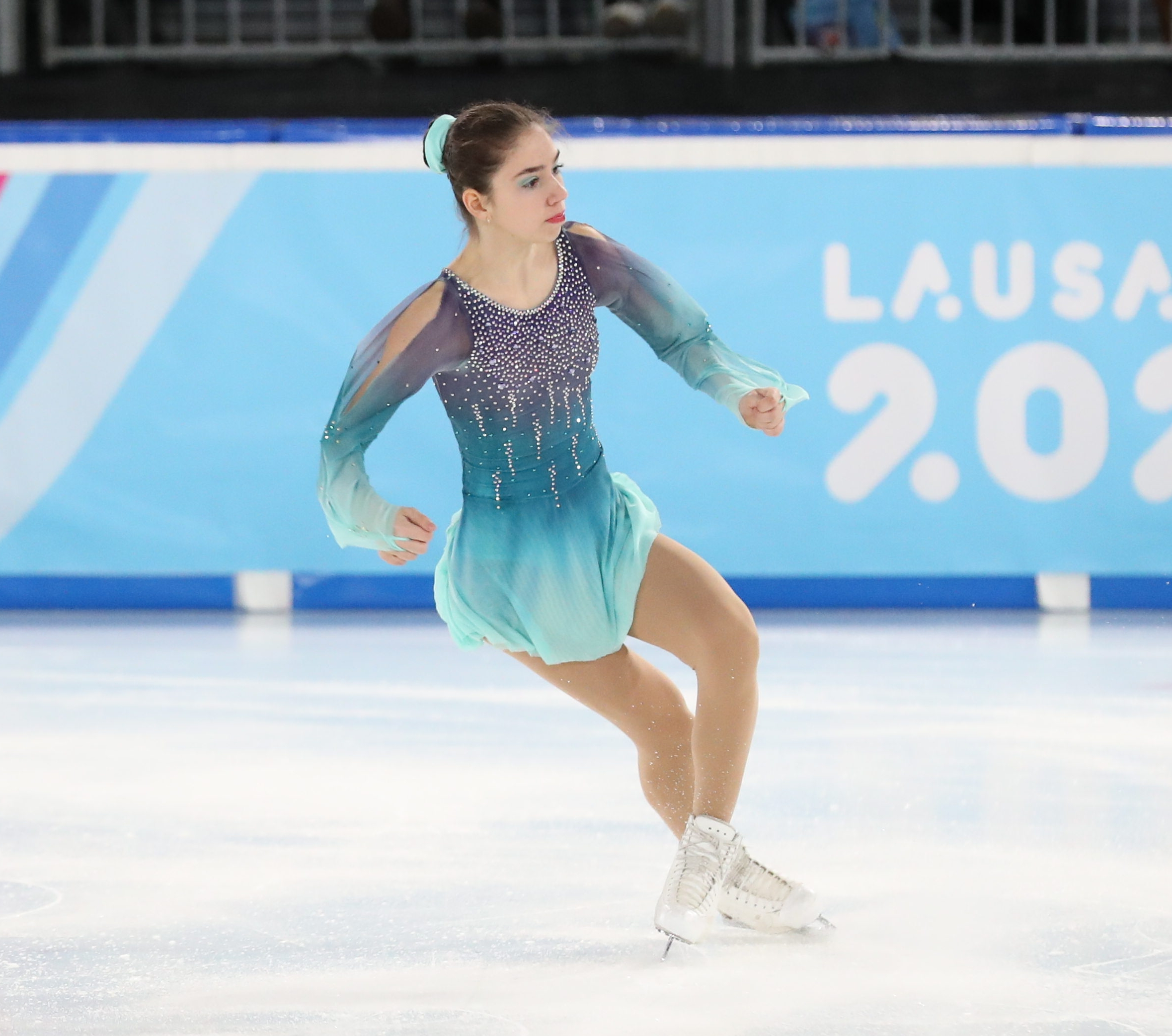
Regina Schermann begins to take off from the ice

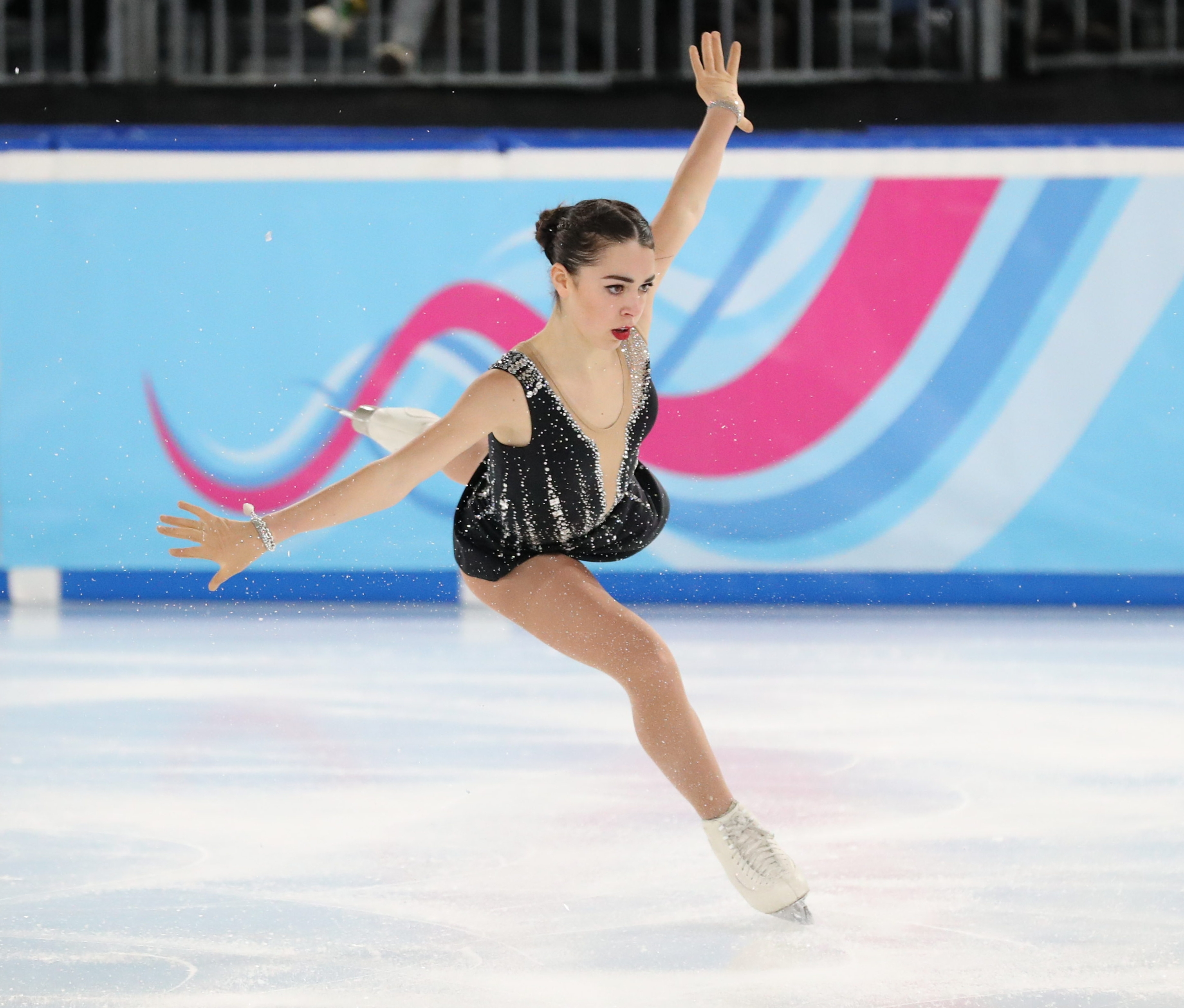
Alessia Tornaghi landing

Video of Amber Glenn performing a series of three-turns followed by a triple loop jump

== Works cited ==
- "ISU Figure Skating Media Guide 2025/26" (PDF). Lausanne, Switzerland: International Skating Union. 21 August 2025. Archived (PDF) from the original on 14 September 2025.
- Kestnbaum, Ellyn (2003). Culture on Ice: Figure Skating and Cultural Meaning. Middletown, Connecticut: Wesleyan University Press. ISBN 0819566411.
