= Salchow jump =

Figure skating jump

Figure skating element
- Element name: Salchow jump
- Scoring abbreviation: S
- Element type: Jump
- Take-off edge: Back inside
- Landing edge: Back outside
- Inventor: Ulrich Salchow

The Salchow jump is an edge jump in figure skating. It was named after its inventor, Ulrich Salchow, in 1909. The Salchow is accomplished with a takeoff from the back inside edge of one foot and a landing on the back outside edge of the opposite foot. It is "usually the first jump that skaters learn to double, and the first or second to triple". Timing is critical because both the takeoff and landing must be on the backward edge. A Salchow is deemed cheated if the skate blade starts to turn forward before the takeoff, or if it has not turned completely backward when the skater lands back on the ice.

In competitions, the base value of a single Salchow is 0.40, for a double Salchow it is 1.30, for a triple 4.30, 9.70 for a quadruple, and 14 for a quintuple.

== History ==
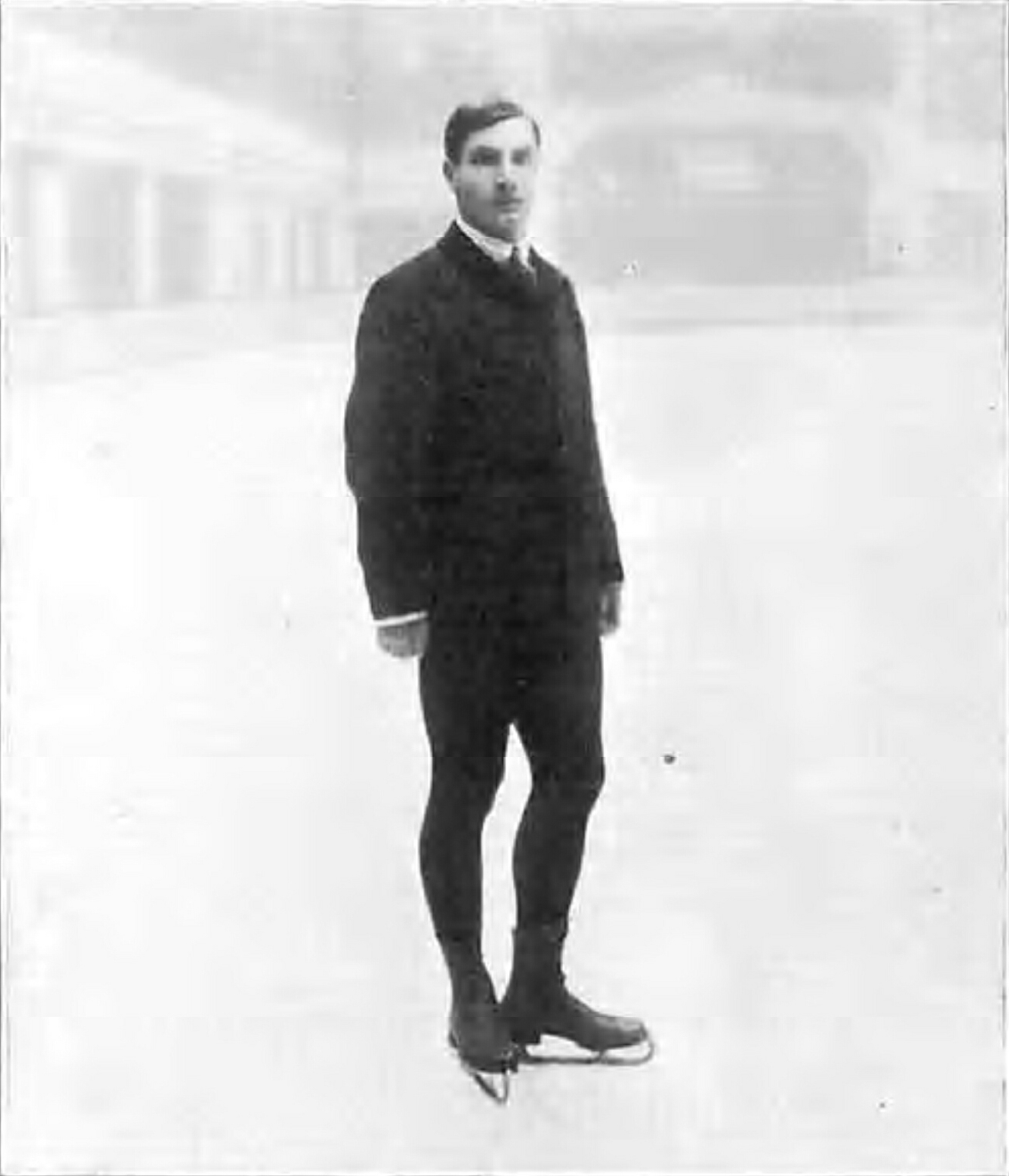
Ulrich Salchow, inventor of the Salchow jump

The Salchow jump was named after its inventor, Swedish world champion Ulrich Salchow in 1909. American skater Theresa Weld "received reprimands" at the 1920 Olympics "for performing a single Salchow jump because her skirt would fly up to her knees, creating an image deemed too risque".

=== Firsts ===
Abbr.	Jump element	Skater	Nation	Event	Ref.
2S	Double Salchow (women's)	Cecilia Colledge	Great Britain	1936 European Championships	
3S	Triple Salchow (men's)	Ronald Robertson	United States	1955 World Championships	
3S	Triple Salchow (women's)	Petra Burka	Canada	1962 Canadian Championships 1965 World Championships	(Note: Not definitely established. A report from the 1961 European Championships stated that Helli Sengstschmid from Austria and Jana Mrazkova from Czechoslovakia had already successfully landed a triple Salchow.)
3S	Triple Salchow (women's)	Helli Sengstschmid	Austria	1961 European Championships	
3S	Triple Salchow (women's)	Jana Mrázková	Czech Republic	1961 European Championships	
4S	Quadruple Salchow (men's)	Timothy Goebel	United States	1997–98 Junior Grand Prix Final	
4S	Quadruple Salchow (women's)	Miki Ando	Japan	2002–03 Junior Grand Prix Final	

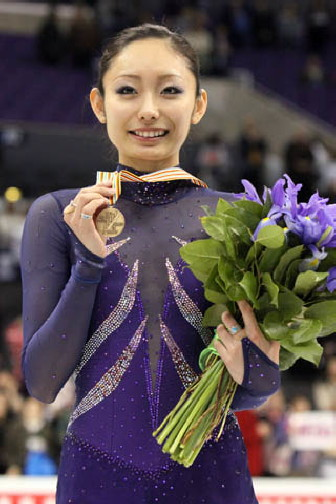
Japanese figure skater Miki Ando (2009)

== Execution ==
As defined by the ISU, the Salchow jump is an edge jump. Its takeoff is made from the back inside edge of one foot, and its landing is made on the back outside edge of the opposite foot. The skater enters into the jump with a backward approach, launches it using their inside edge, and lands on the opposite outside edge. The free leg is extended behind the skater and swings toward the front as they spring into the air while, at the same time, drawing their arms in. Skaters do not have to draw in their arms or free leg close to their bodies while performing the single Salchow because bringing the free side of their bodies forward and around the opposite side of their bodies after they turn towards the back is enough to produce the necessary rotation.

The rotation in the air, with respect to a fixed point, is slightly less than 360 degrees because the takeoff edge curves in the same direction as the rotation in the air. When a skater pulls the arms into their body and/or brings their free leg inward, more rotations can be performed; for this reason, the Salchow is "usually the first jump that skaters learn to double, and the first or second to triple". As U.S. Figure Skating states, however, "timing is critical" with the execution of the Salchow because both the takeoff and landing must be on the backward edge.

== Gallery ==
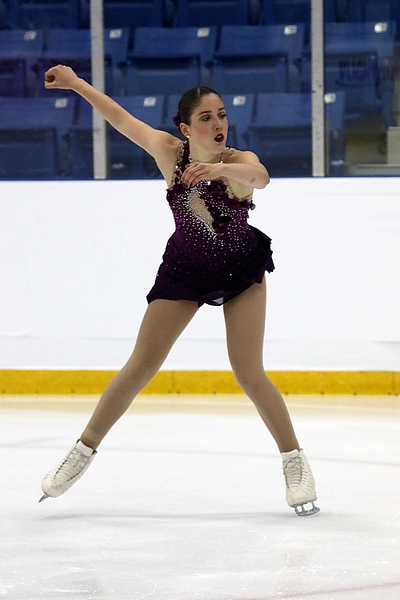
Sarah Isabella Bardua begins the take-off of a Salchow

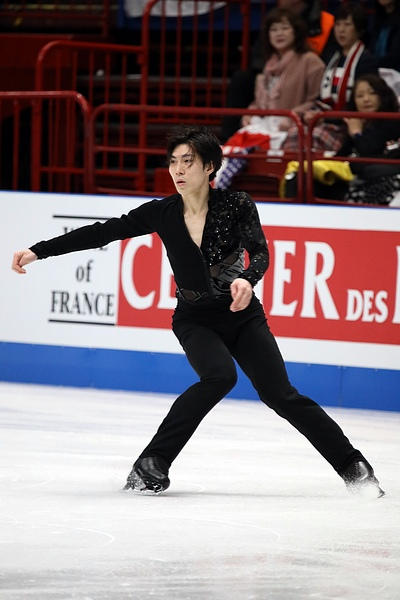
Keiji Tanaka begins the take-off of a Salchow

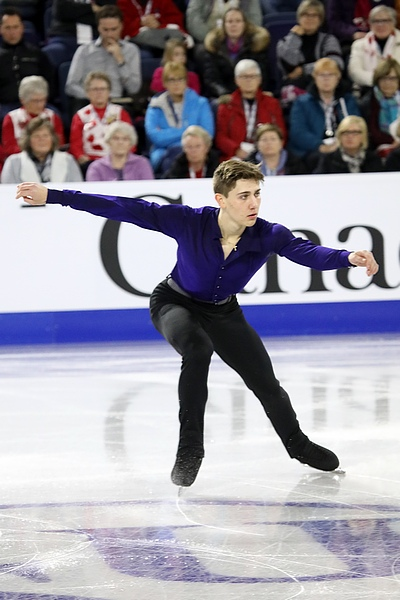
Roman Sadovsky begins the take-off of a Salchow

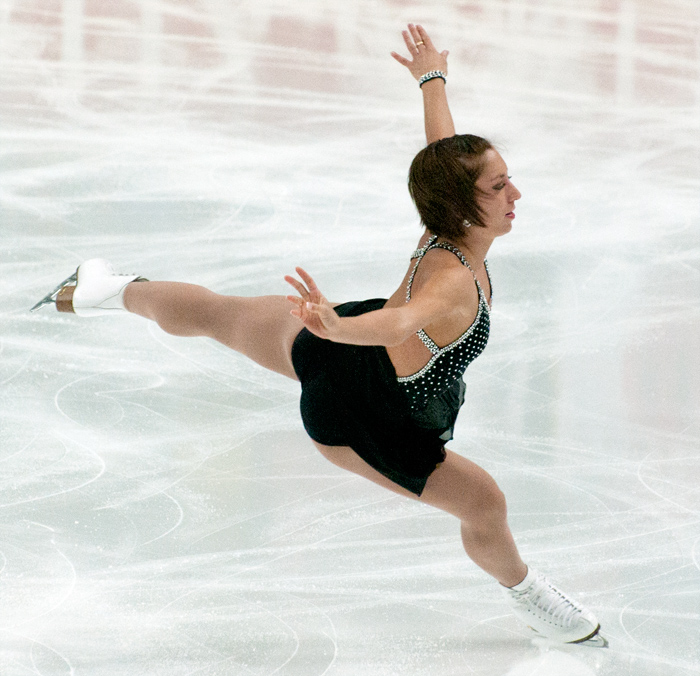
Amélie Lacoste landing

== Videos ==
Kim Chae-yeon performing a triple Salchow jump (real-time and slow motion)

Kazuki Tomono performing a quadruple Salchow jump (real-time and slow motion)

Lara Naki Gutmann performing a triple Lutz jump - Euler jump- triple Salchow combination (real-time and slow motion)

== Works cited ==
- Hines, James R. (2011). Historical Dictionary of Figure Skating. Lanham, Maryland: Scarecrow Press. ISBN 978-0-8108-6859-5.
- "ISU Figure Skating Media Guide 2025/26" (PDF). Lausanne, Switzerland: International Skating Union. 21 August 2025. Archived (PDF) from the original on 14 September 2025.
- Kestnbaum, Ellyn (2003). Culture on Ice: Figure Skating and Cultural Meaning. Middletown, Connecticut: Wesleyan University Press. ISBN 0819566411.
