= List of eponyms (L–Z) =

An eponym is a person (real or fictitious) whose name has become identified with a particular object or activity.

Here is a list of eponyms:

== L ==
- Rudolf Laban, Slovak choreographer – labanotation.
- René Lacoste, French tennis player – Lacoste.
- Lady Windermere, Irish theatrical character - Lady Windermere syndrome.
- Joseph-Louis Lagrange, Italian-French mathematician and astronomer - Lagrange point.
- Ferruccio Lamborghini, Italian car builder – Lamborghini.
- Vincenzo Lancia, Italian car builder – Lancia.
- Francesco Landini, Italian composer – Landini cadence, might be described in its most characteristic form as a variation on the harmonic progression in which an unstable sixth (usually major) expands to a stable octave.
- Edwin Henry Landseer, British painter and sculptor – Landseer (dog).
- Paul Langerhans, German biologist – Islets of Langerhans, Langerhans cell, Langerhans cell histiocytosis.
- Samuel Pierpont Langley, American astronomer and physicist – langley a measurement of solar radiation.
- Lev Davidovich Landau, Azerbaijani-Russian physicist – Landau pole, Landau damping.
- Chris Langton, American computer scientist – Langton's ant.
- A. C. Larrieu, French Moon observer - Larrieu's dam (a clair-obscur effect on the Moon's surface during local sunset conditions, appearing like a rectilinear scarp-like feature at crater Polybius K)
- Bent Larsen, Danish chess player – Larsen's Opening.
- Giovanni Paolo Lascaris, Italian nobleman – Lascaris towers, Lascaris Battery.
- Saint Lawrence of Rome, Italian Christian saint – Saint Lawrence River, San Lawrenz, and numerous other localities, churches and cathedrals.
- Ernest Lawrence, American physicist – lawrencium.
- Lazarus of Bethany, Biblical character – Lazarus sign, Lazarus syndrome, Lazarus taxon.
- Lech, Slavic mythological character – Lechites (Poles).
- Bruce Lee, American-Chinese actor – Bruceploitation.
- Peter Lee, English miner – Peterlee, a town in County Durham.
- Ernst Leitz, German businessman and photographer – Leica Camera.
- Alfredo di Lelio, Italian cook – Alfredo sauce.
- Vladimir Ilyich Lenin, Russian head of state – Leninism, Lenin's Testament, for various places see Lenino and List of places named after Lenin.
- John Lennard-Jones, British mathematician – Lennard-Jones potential
- John Lennon, British rock musician - Lennon glasses
- Leopold I of Belgium, Belgian king – Leopoldsburg, Leopold I, Kings Gallery, Leopold Quarter, Order of Leopold.
- Leopold II of Belgium, Belgian king – King Leopold Ranges, Prince Gallery, Villa La Léopolda, Order of Leopold II, Leopold II Tunnel, Léopoldville.
- Leopold III of Belgium, Belgian king – Leopold dtella, Pterophyllum leopoldi, Potamotrygon leopoldi, Leopoldism, Leopold and Astrid Coast
- Jules Léotard, French acrobat – leotard.
- Donald Leslie, American inventor - Leslie speaker.
- Winford Lee Lewis, American chemist – lewisite.
- Lars Levi Læstadius, Swedish religious leader – Laestadianism.
- Georg Christoph Lichtenberg, German physicist, satirist, and Anglophile - Lichtenberg figure.
- Alice Liddell, British child – Alice in Wonderland syndrome
- Liechtenstein dynasty, Liechtensteinian royal family – Liechtenstein.
- Alphonsus Liguori, Italian theologian – Liguorists (another name for Redemptorists).
- Gösta Hjalmar Liljequist, Swedish meteorologist - Liljequist parhelion
- Abraham Lincoln, American president – Lincoln Records; ships USS Abraham Lincoln (SSBN-602), USS Abraham Lincoln (CVN-72); Lincoln is a slang term for the United States five-dollar bill.
- Charles Lindbergh, American pilot – Lindbergh Law.
- Teunis van der Linden, Dutch chemist – Lindane.
- Jules Antoine Lissajous, French physicist - Lissajous curve, Lissajous orbit.
- Joseph Lister, British physician – Listerine mouthwash.
- Little Goody Two-Shoes, British literary character – The English derogatory term "goody two-shoes" for someone who is irritatingly bland and nice.
- William Howard Livens, British military officer and inventor - Livens projector.
- David Livingstone, Scottish explorer – Livingstone daisy, Livingstone, Zambia.
- Ignacio de la Llave, Mexican general and governor – Veracruz-Llave.
- Matthias de l'Obel (sometimes spelled as Lobel), Flemish physician and botanist – Lobelia.
- Sanford Lockwood Cluett, American businessman – Sanforization.
- Veronica Lodge, American comics character – the Veronica search engine.
- James Harvey Logan, American judge and horticulturist – loganberry.
- Fritz London, German physicist – London force.
- Ruy López de Segura, Spanish monk – Ruy Lopez opening in chess.
- Carl Lorenz, German businessman - Lorenz cipher.
- Hendrik Lorentz, Dutch physicist – Lorentz force, Lorentz transformation.
- Lothar, German-French emperor – Lorraine, French province.
- Allan Haines Loughead, American aviator – Lockheed Corporation later to become Lockheed Martin in 1995.
- Louis IX of France, French king – St. Louis, Missouri and dozens of other places named Saint Louis
- Louis XIV, French king – Louisiana, Louis XIV furniture, Louis XIV style
- Pierre Charles Alexandre Louis, French physician – Angle of Louis.
- Princess Louise Caroline Alberta, fourth daughter of Queen Victoria – Alberta
- H. P. Lovecraft, American novelist – Lovecraftian horror
- Johann Tobias Lowitz, German-born Russian apothecary and experimental chemist - Lowitz arc
- Georg Luger, Austrian inventor - Luger pistol.
- Hubert von Luschka, German anatomist – foramina of Luschka (outlets for cerebrospinal fluid in the brain); Luschka's crypts; Luschka's joints.
- Saint Lucy of Syracuse, Italian Christian saint – Saint Lucia.
- Rosa Luxemburg, German politician – Luxemburgism
- Martin Luther, German religious leader – Lutheranism
- Alois Lutz, Austrian figure skater – Lutz jump
- Willem Jacob Luyten, Dutch-American astronomer - Luyten's star, Luyten's flare star (L 726–8)
- Charles Lynch, American politician – lynching, lynch law.
- David Lynch, American film director - Lynchian (films made in his characteristic style)
- Trofim Lysenko, Ukrainian-Russian biologist – Lysenkoism.

== M ==
- John Macadam, Scottish-Australian chemist – Macadamia.
- Ernst Mach, Czech-Austrian physicist – Mach number.
- Karel Hynek Mácha, Czech novelist and poet – Lake Mácha (Czech: Máchovo jezero), in the Czech Republic
- Niccolò Machiavelli, Italian politician and writer – Machiavellianism.
- John Macdonald, New Zealand psychologist – Macdonald triad.
- Charles Macintosh, Scottish inventor – Mackintosh raincoat
- Alexander Mackenzie, American explorer – Mackenzie River, Mackenzie Bay
- Colin Maclaurin, Scottish mathematician – Maclaurin series, Maclaurin's inequality, Sectrix of Maclaurin, Trisectrix of Maclaurin.
- Rowland Hussey Macy, American businessman – Macy's.
- Johann Heinrich von Mädler, German astronomer - the Mädler phenomenon (comet-tail like arcs near the observed image of bright planet Venus, the same entoptic phenomenon as Purkyne's blue arcs near an unsteady red-colored pointlike lightsource), Mädler's square (a more-or-less rectangle shaped formation near crater Fontenelle on the moon's surface)
- George Maduro, Dutch resistance fighter – Madurodam.
- Gaius Maecenas, Roman patron of literature and the arts – maecenas (arts patron)
- Ferdinand Magellan, Portuguese explorer – Strait of Magellan, Large Magellanic Cloud, Small Magellanic Cloud
- François Magendie, French physiologist – foramen of Magendie.
- Pierre Magnol, French botanist – magnolia.
- Heinrich Gustav Magnus, German chemist – Magnus effect, Magnus's green salt.
- Jules Germain François Maisonneuve, French surgeon – Maisonneuve fracture.
- Nestor Makhno, Ukrainian revolutionary leader – Makhnovism.
- Mrs. Malaprop, a character in The Rivals, a play by Richard Brinsley Sheridan – malapropism.
- La Malinche, Aztec translator – Malinchism, Malinche (volcano).
- G. Kenneth Mallory American physician, and Soma Weiss, Hungarian physician – Mallory–Weiss syndrome.
- Marcello Malpighi, Italian surgeon – Malpighian corpuscles, Malpighian tubule system, Malpighian pyramids, Malpighiaceae
- Thomas Malthus, British economist – Malthusian, Malthusianism, Malthusian Growth Model, Malthusian catastrophe
- Giorgio and Gregorio Mamo, Maltese land owners – Mamo Tower
- Nelson Mandela, South African activist and president – Mandela effect, Nelson Mandela Day, Madiba shirt ("Madiba" was Mandela's nickname, derived from his tribe).
- Benoît Mandelbrot, Polish mathematician – Mandelbrot set.
- Mani, Mesopotamian religious leader – Manichaeism.
- Russ Manning, American comics artist – Russ Manning Award
- Manolete, Spanish bullfighter – "Manoletina technique".
- Antoine Marfan, French physician – Marfan syndrome.
- Margherita of Savoy, Italian queen – pizza margherita. although it probably was not called "Margherita". In 1830, in the book Napoli, contorni e dintorni, written by Riccio, it was described as a pizza with tomato, mozzarella and basil.
- Henrietta Maria of France, French-born English queen – Maryland
- Queen Mariana of Austria or Marie-Anne of Austria, Austrian-born Spanish queen – Mariana Islands, Mariana Trench
- Pierre Marie, French neurologist – Charcot–Marie–Tooth disease
- Mariko Aoki, Japanese essayist – Mariko Aoki phenomenon.
- Giambattista Marino, Italian poet – Marinism.
- Saint Marinus, Christian saint – San Marino
- Mark the Evangelist, Christian saint – Saint Mark's Tower
- Benjamin Markarian, Armenian astrophysicist – Markarian galaxies
- Michael Marks and Thomas Spencer, British businessmen – Marks and Spencer
- Géza Maróczy, Hungarian chess player – Maróczy Bind
- Mars, Greek-Roman mythological character – Martius (month), Mars (planet)
- Frank Mars, American businessman – Mars (chocolate bar)
- James Marsh, British chemist and inventor - Marsh test.
- Frank Marshall, American chess player – Marshall Defense
- George C. Marshall, American general – Marshall Plan.
- John Marshall, British explorer – Marshall Islands
- Maurice Martenot, French inventor – Ondes Martenot
- Henry Martin, American businessman – Martinizing Dry Cleaning
- Lionel Martin, British businessman – Aston Martin
- Glenn Luther Martin, American businessman – Glenn L. Martin Company (later Lockheed Martin).
- Jean Martinet, French militarian – martinet (a disciplinarian).
- Alessandro Martini, Italian businessman – Martini (cocktail), Martini (vermouth).
- Groucho Marx, American comedian and film actor – Groucho glasses, Grouchoesque.
- Karl Marx, German philosopher and economist – Marxism.
- Mary, mother of Jesus – numerous communities and geographic features (either named St. Mary or having the word Lady in them) like the Marists, a large number of cathedrals, churches, and religious orders, the ladybird
- Mary the Jewess, ancient alchemist – Bain-marie to warm substances such as Elixir to germinate precious metals.
- Alfieri Maserati, Italian businessman – Maserati.
- Perry Mason, American TV character - Perry Mason syndrome
- Abraham Maslow, American psychologist – Maslow's hammer, Maslow's hierarchy of needs, Maslow-Toffler School of Futuristic Education, and Maslowian portfolio theory.
- Charles Mason and Jeremiah Dixon, British astronomers – Mason–Dixon line.
- John L. Mason, American inventor – Mason jar.
- Alonzo C. Mather, American businessman – Mather Stock Car Company.
- Matilda Joslyn Gage, suffragist and abolitionist — Matilda effect.
- Matthew the Apostle, Biblical prophet – Matthew effect.
- Harold Matson and Elliot Handler, American businessmen – Mattel.
- Jujiro Matsuda, Japanese businessman – Mazda (also possibly inspired by Zoroastrian god Ahura Mazda)
- Queen Maud of Norway, Norwegian queen – Queen Maud Gulf (Canada), Queen Maud Land in Antarctica, Queen Maud fromage.
- Maurice of Nassau, Dutch politician – Mauritius
- Paul Mauser and Wilhelm Mauser, German businessmen – Mauser gun
- Maussollus, Carian king – mausoleum.
- Max und Moritz, German comics/literary characters – Max & Moritz Prize
- Hiram Maxim, American gun inventor – Maxim gun
- James Clerk Maxwell, British physicist – maxwell, Maxwell equations, Maxwell's spot (a bright magenta colored spot at the center of vision, when looking at a deep purple or violet background or through a violet color filter)
- Louis B. Mayer, American film producer – Louis B. Mayer Pictures which later merged into Metro–Goldwyn–Mayer (or MGM).
- Walther Mayer and Leopold Vietoris, Austrian mathematicians – Mayer–Vietoris axiom, Mayer–Vietoris theorem.
- Thabo Mbeki, South-African president – Mbekite.
- John Loudon McAdam, Scottish engineer – macadam process of road construction, tarmac (tar+macadam) road surface
- Charles McBurney, American surgeon – McBurney's point (aka McBurney's sign), a sign of acute appendicitis.
- Joseph McCarthy, American politician – McCarthyism.
- Richard and Maurice McDonald, American businesspeople – McDonald's
- James Smith McDonnell, American businessman – McDonnell Aircraft, later to become McDonnell Douglas.
- Giuseppe Meazza, Italian association football player and manager – Stadio Giuseppe Meazza.
- Medusa, Greek mythological character – Medusa (biology), Medusa piercing, Medusa pepper, Medusaceratops.
- Heinrich Meibome, German physician – Meibomian gland
- Henri Meige, French neurologist – Meige's syndrome
- Georg Meissner, German anatomist – Meissner's corpuscles
- Walther Meissner and Robert Ochsenfeld, German physicists – Meissner effect (or Meissner–Ochsenfeld effect)
- Lise Meitner, Austrian-Swedish physicist – meitnerium.
- Meiji, Japanese emperor – Meiji Shrine.
- Nellie Melba, Australian opera singer – Melba toast, Peach Melba, Melba (a suburb of Canberra, Australia)
- William Lamb, 2nd Viscount Melbourne, British Prime Minister – Melbourne.
- Gregor Mendel, Czech botanist – Mendelian inheritance, Mendel Polar Station.
- Dmitri Mendeleev, Russian chemist – mendelevium, periodic table of Mendeleev
- Prosper Ménière, French physician – Ménière's disease
- Mentor, Greek mythological character – mentor (a trusted friend, counselor or teacher, usually a more experienced person), mentoring programs.
- Giuseppe Mercalli, Italian seismologist – Mercalli intensity scale of an earthquake
- Gerard Mercator, Flemish cartographer – Mercator projection.
- Nicholas Mercator, German mathematician – Mercator series.
- John Mercer, British chemist – mercerised cotton.
- Ismail Merchant, British film producer, and James Ivory, American film director – Merchant Ivory Productions.
- Mercury Greek-Roman mythological character – Mercury (planet), Mercury (element) and Mercury poisoning.
- Robert Mertens, Russian-German biologist – Mertensian mimicry, Robert Mertens's day gecko, Mertens' water monitor.
- Charles Merrill, American businessman – Merrill Lynch.
- Marin Mersenne, French mathematician – Mersenne prime, Mersenne's laws, Mersenne twister.
- Franz Anton Mesmer, German hypnotist – Mesmerism, "to mesmerize".
- Messalina, Roman empress – a messalina (debaucherous woman), messaline.
- Wilhelm Messerschmitt, German engineer – Messerschmitt.
- Charles Messier, French astronomer – Messier object.
- Ioannis Metaxas, Greek Prime Minister – Metaxism.
- Robert Metcalfe, American electrical engineer – Metcalfe's law
- Methuselah, Biblical character – A Methuselah (nickname for a very old person), Methuselah (6-litre wine bottle see Wine bottle#Sizes)
- Saint Michael, Biblical character – Order of Saint Michael and Saint George, Arkhangelsk, and numerous other places with St Michael or Archangel in them.
- André Michelin, French businessman – Michelin, Michelin guide.
- Giovanni Michelotti, Italian businessman – Michelotti.
- Carl Miele, German businessman – Miele
- Jacques Mieses, German chessplayer – Mieses Opening
- Caspar Milquetoast, American comics character – Milquetoast (a weak, ineffectual or bland person.)
- Hermann Minkowski, German mathematician – Minkowski addition, Minkowski inequality, Minkowski space, Minkowski diagram, Minkowski's theorem.
- Minos, mythological king of Crete, for whom the Minoan civilization is named.
- Marcel Minnaert, Belgian-Dutch astronomer – Minnaert resonance, Minnaert function.
- Minthe, Greek mythological character – Mentha
- Ernesto Miranda, American criminal – Miranda Warning
- Miriam, Biblical character – bain-Marie
- Mithridates VI of Pontus, king – mithridatium, mithridatism.
- Walter Mitty, American literary character – a "Walter Mitty" (a hopeless dreamer).
- Sakuzo Miyamori, Japanese observer of the moon's surface - Miyamori valley (a so-called valley between craters Lohrmann and Riccioli, near the western limb of the moon's Earth-faced hemisphere).
- Mobutu, Zaïrese president – Mobutism.
- August Ferdinand Moebius, German astronomer and mathematician – Moebius strip
- Paul Julius Möbius, German neurologist – Möbius syndrome.
- Moctezuma II, Aztec emperor – Montezuma's revenge.
- Morgan le Fay, British mythological character – Fata Morgana.
- Andrija Mohorovičić, Croatian seismologist – Mohorovičić discontinuity
- Jarmo Moilanen - Moilanen arc (a rare V-shaped halo phenomenon)
- Gert Molière, German mathematician – Molière radius.
- Luis de Molina, Spanish religious leader – Molinism.
- Jacob Anton Moll, Dutch physician – Moll's gland
- Vyacheslav Molotov, Russian politician – Molotov cocktail
- James Monroe, American president – Monroe Doctrine, Monrovia
- Marilyn Monroe, American film actress – Monroe piercing
- Montanus, Christian religious leader – Montanism
- Moses Montefiore, British banker – Montefiore Medical Center.
- Maria Montessori, Italian educator – Montessori education.
- Ambroise Monell, American businessman – Monel metal.
- Louis de Montfort, French religious leader – Montfortians.
- Giuseppe Monti, Italian botanist – Montia.
- The Montgolfier Brothers, French inventors – Montgolfier balloon.
- Bernard Montgomery, British general – monty coat, nickname for a Duffel coat., Montgomery cocktail.
- William Fetherstone Montgomery, Irish obstetrician – Glands of Montgomery.
- Monty Python, British comedy collective – Pythonesque.
- Robert Moog, American inventor – Moog synthesizer.
- Sun Myung Moon, South-Korean religious leader – Moonie.
- Gordon Moore, American businessman – Moore's law.
- Jean Moreau de Sechelles, French politician – Seychelles
- José María Morelos, Mexican revolutionary – Morelos, Morelia.
- Prince Morgan the Old of Gwent, Welsh king – Glamorgan.
- Mormon, American mythological prophet – Mormonism.
- Ernst Moro, Austrian physician – Moro reflex.
- Samuel Morse, British inventor – Morse code.
- Morpheus, Greek mythological character – morphine.
- Ennio Morricone, Italian composer - Morricone-eque (music, especially film soundtracks composed in his characteristic style).
- John Morton, English archbishop of Canterbury – Morton's Fork (a choice between two equally unpleasant alternatives), Morton's fork coup.
- Jerry Moss and Herb Alpert, American musicians – A&M Records.
- Rudolf Mössbauer, German physicist – Mössbauer effect.
- Lord Louis Mountbatten, British naval officer – Mountbatten pink.
- Mickey Mouse, American cartoon character – Mickey Mousing, Mickey Mouse degrees
- Mowgli, British-Indian literary character – Mowgli syndrome.
- Wolfgang Amadeus Mozart, German-Austrian composer – Mozartkugel, Mozart effect, Mozart Medal, the word 'Mozart' became synonymous for '(musical) child prodigy' and 'virtuoso'
- Erasto B. Mpemba, Tanzanian physicist – Mpemba effect
- Antonín Mrkos, Czech astronomer – The comets 18D/Perrine-Mrkos, 45P/Honda-Mrkos-Pajdusakova, 124P/Mrkos and 143P/Kowal-Mrkos.
- Muhammad, Saudi Arabian religious leader – Muhammadanism
- Fritz Müller, German biologist – Müllerian mimicry
- Walther Müller, German physicist – Geiger–Müller tube
- Franz Carl Müller-Lyer, German psychologist and sociologist — Müller-Lyer illusion.
- David Mulligan, American hotel manager – Mulligan.
- Baron Munchausen, German baron – Munchausen syndrome, Munchausen syndrome by proxy
- Hugo Münsterberg, German-American psychologist, Münsterberg illusion
- Ian Murdock, American software engineer, and Debra Murdock, his wife. – Debian project for free software, made after combining Ian's and his wife's name Debra.
- Edward A. Murphy Jr., American engineer – Murphy's law.
- William Lawrence Murphy, American inventor – Murphy bed.
- The Muses, Greek mythological characters – a muse, musaeum, museum.
- Mytyl and Tytltyl, Belgian theatrical characters – Mytyl school and Tyltyl school.

== N ==
- Oskar Naegeli, Swiss chess player – Naegeli–Franceschetti–Jadassohn syndrome
- Miguel Najdorf, Polish-Argentine chess player – Sicilian Defence, Najdorf Variation
- Fridtjof Nansen, Norwegian explorer – Nansen passport
- John Napier, Scottish mathematician – neper, unit of relative power level, Napier's bones, method for performing multiplication.
- Napoleon I, Corsican-French general and emperor – Napoleonic Code, Napoleonic Wars, Napoleon complex, Napoleon Opening, Napoleon cake.
- Narcissus, Greek mythological character – narcissism.
- John Forbes Nash, British mathematician – Nash equilibrium, Nash embedding theorem.
- Francis Nash, American general – Nashville, Tennessee and all other cities named Nashville in the United States.
- Joachim Neander, German poet – Neanderthal (valley) was named after him, and thus the Neandertal fossil found there.
- Nebuchadnezzar, Babylonian king – nebuchadnezzar, 15-litre wine bottle.
- Francis Negus, British military officer – negus.
- Jawaharlal Nehru, Indian politician – Nehru jacket, Nehru Planetarium.
- Horatio Nelson, 1st Viscount Nelson, British admiral – Nelson (New Zealand), Nelson hold.
- Nemesis, Greek-Roman mythological character – a nemesis (arch enemy).
- Neptunus, Roman mythological character – neptunium.
- Walther Nernst, German chemist – Nernst effect, Nernst lamp.
- Nero, Roman emperor – Nero Decree, Nero Burning ROM.
- Henri Nestlé, German-Swiss businessman – Nestlé.
- Nestorius, Patriarch of Constantinople – Nestorianism
- John von Neumann, Hungarian-American mathematician and computer programmer – Von Neumann machine, Von Neumann probe, Von Neumann architecture, John von Neumann Theory Prize, IEEE John von Neumann Medal
- Rolf Nevanlinna, Finnish mathematician – Nevanlinna theory.
- Isaac Newton, British mathematician and physicist – newton – unit of force, Newton's law of cooling, Newton's law of gravitation, Newton's laws of motion, Newton's rings, Newtonian reflecting telescope.
- Martin Newell, British-American computer scientist and coder - Newell teapot.
- Nicarao, Nahua ruler – Nicaragua.
- William Nicol, Scottish geologist and physicist - Nicol prism.
- Jean Nicot, French explorer – nicotine.
- Arthur Nielsen, American market analyst – Nielsen ratings, Nielsen Media Research.
- Florence Nightingale, British nurse – Nightingale Pledge, Florence Nightingale effect.
- Niobe, Greek-Roman mythological character – niobium.
- Aron Nimzowitsch, Latvian-Russian-Danish chessplayer – Nimzo–Indian Defence.
- Peter Norman Nissen, Canadian-American-British engineer – Nissen hut.
- Richard Nixon, American president – Nixonomics, Nixon mask.
- Alfred Nobel, Swedish inventor and activist – Nobel Prizes, nobelium.
- Emmy Noether, German mathematician – Noether's theorem, Noetherian rings.
- Norbert of Xanten, German bishop – The Norbertines.
- Ian Norman and Gerry Harvey, Australian businessmen – Harvey Norman.
- Edward Lawry Norton, American engineer – Norton's theorem.
- Peter Norton, American businessman – Norton AntiVirus.
- Pedro Nunes, Portuguese mathematician and inventor – nonius
- Nyctimene, Greek mythological character – Nyctimene, a genus of bats

== O ==
- Barack Obama, American President – Obamacare, Obamanomics.
- Obsius, discoverer (in Pliny) of an obsidian-like stone – obsidian.
- Oceanus, Greek-Roman mythological character – ocean.
- Robert Ochsenfeld and Walter Meissner, German physicists – Meissner–Ochsenfeld effect (Meissner effect).
- William of Ockham, British philosopher – Occam's Razor.
- Odysseus, Greek mythological character – odyssey.
- Oedipus, Greek mythological character – Oedipus complex.
- Oengus I of the Picts, Pictian king – Angus.
- Yuri Oganessian, Russian-Armenian nuclear physicist - oganesson.
- Georg Ohm, German physicist – ohm, Ohm's law, Ohm's acoustic law.
- Nobuo Okishio, Japanese economist – Okishio's theorem.
- Ransom E. Olds, American businessman and automobile designer - Oldsmobile.
- Onan, Biblical character – onanism.
- Eugene Onegin, Russian literary character – Onegin stanza.
- John Joseph O'Neill, American journalist - O'Neill's bridge (a so-called artificial bridge on the moon's surface, between Promontorium Lavinium and Promontorium Olivium at the western part of Mare Crisium's rim).
- Jan Oort, Dutch astronomer – Oort cloud.
- Adam Opel, German businessman – Opel.
- Daphne Oram, British composer and electronic musician - Oramics.
- William of Orange, Dutch politician – Orangism.
- Leonard Ornstein, Dutch physicist – Ornstein–Zernike equation, Ornstein–Uhlenbeck process.
- Orpheus, Greek mythological character – orphism (religion), orphism (art), Orphean warbler.
- Charles Boyle, 4th Earl of Orrery, British nobleman – the orrery.
- Hans Christian Ørsted, Danish physicist and chemist – oersted, unit of magnetic field strength.
- Joe Orton, British playwright - Ortonesque (works reminiscent of his style).
- George Orwell, British novelist – Orwellian.
- Robert Bayley Osgood, American physician and Carl B. Schlatter, Swiss physician – Osgood–Schlatter disease.
- Osman I, Turkish sultan – Ottoman Empire.
- Wilhelm Ostwald, Latvian-German chemist – Ostwald process.
- Nicolaus Otto, German engineer and inventor – Otto engine.
- John Owen, British chess player – Owen's Defence.
- Robert Owen, Welsh social reformer and activist – Owenism.

== P ==
- Giuseppe Pace, Maltese bishop – Paceville
- David Packard and William Hewlett, American business people – Hewlett-Packard
- Larry Page, American businessman – PageRank algorithm.
- Reza Shah Pahlavi, Iranian shah – Pahlavi hat.
- František Palacký, Czech historian and politician – Palacký University, Olomouc.
- Andrea Palladio, Italian architect – Palladian architecture, Palladian villas, palazzo.
- Peter Simon Pallas, Russian biologist and botanist – pallasite.
- Arnold Palmer, British golfer – Arnold Palmer.
- Pamela, British literary character – Pamela hat.
- Pamphilus, Italian theatrical character – pamphlet.
- Pan, Greek mythological character – panflute, the word panic, Peter Pan
- Peter Pan, British theatrical character – Peter Pan syndrome, Peter Pan collar.
- Panacea, Greek mythological character – panacea.
- Pandora, Greek mythological character – Pandora's box.
- Pantalone, Italian theatrical character – pantalone, pants.
- Paparazzo, a press photographer in Federico Fellini's film La Dolce Vita – paparazzi.
- Denis Papin, French inventor – papinian cooking pot, Papin's digester
- Vilfredo Pareto, Italian economist – Pareto principle, Pareto efficiency, Pareto distribution, Pareto index
- Bernard Parham, American chess player – Parham Attack.
- C. Northcote Parkinson, British historian – Parkinson's law.
- James Parkinson, British physician – Parkinson's disease.
- Rosa Parks, American activist – Rosa Parks Highway.
- Antoine-Augustin Parmentier, French agronome – Hachis Parmentier.
- Sir William Edward Parry, Anglo-Welsh explorer of the Arctic - Parry arc.
- Blaise Pascal, French mathematician – pascal, Pascal's triangle, Pascal's Wager or Pascal's Gambit, Pascal programming language, Pascal's theorem.
- Louis Pasteur, French chemist – Pasteurization.
- Saint Paul – Saint Paul (Minnesota), São Paulo, St Paul's Island, St. Paul's Bay, St. Paul's Bay Tower, and numerous other localities, churches and cathedrals.
- Vincent de Paul, French humanitarian activist and priest – Society of Saint Vincent de Paul.
- Antoine de Paule, Maltese knight – Paola, Malta.
- Wolfgang Pauli, Austrian-Swiss physicist – Pauli exclusion principle.
- Axel Paulsen, Norwegian figure skater – Axel jump.
- Ivan Petrovich Pavlov, Russian biologist – Pavlovian conditioning.
- Anna Pavlova, Russian ballet dancer – Pavlova dessert.
- John Pazmino, American amateur astronomer — Pazmino's cluster (Stock 23: an open star cluster between the constellations Camelopardalis and Cassiopeia, containing the double star Σ 362).
- Giuseppe Peano, Italian mathematician – Peano axioms.
- Mr. Pecksniff, British literary character – Pecksniffian
- Pelagius, British theologian – pelagianism.
- Pelé, Brazilian football player – Pelé Law.
- Jean Charles Athanase Peltier, French physicist – Peltier effect, Peltier coefficient, Peltier plate.
- William Penn, British-American politician and explorer – Pennsylvania.
- James Cash Penney, American business man – J. C. Penney.
- Roger Penrose, British mathematician – Penrose diagram, Penrose tiling, Penrose triangle, Penrose stairs, Penrose chickens
- Ramon Perellos y Roccaful, Maltese knight – Perellos Redoubt, Perellos Tower.
- Dom Pérignon, French monk – Dom Pérignon.
- Juan Perón, Argentine president – Peronism.
- Louis Perrier, French physician and business man – Perrier.
- Louis-Jérôme Perrot, French civil engineer – perrotine printing.
- Antoinette Perry, American actress and theatre director – Tony Award
- Fred Perry, British tennis player – Fred Perry shirt.
- John J. Pershing, American general – Pershing boot.
- Philippe Pétain, French general and politician – Petainisme.
- Philipp Lenard, Hungarian-born German physicist – Lenard effect.
- Saints Peter and Fevronia, Russian Christian saints – Peter and Fevronia Day.
- Saint Peter, apostle of Jesus Christ – Saint-Pierre and Miquelon, Saint Petersburg, Peterborough, and numerous other localities, churches and cathedrals.
- Laurence J. Peter, Canadian pedagogue – Peter principle.
- Arno Peters, German historian – Gall–Peters projection.
- Alexander Petrov, Russian chess player – Petrov's Defence
- Armand Peugeot, French car builder and business man – Peugeot.
- Phaeton, Greek mythological character – Phaeton (carriage).
- François-André Danican Philidor, French composer and chess player – Philidor Defence.
- Dallas B. Phemister, surgeon – Phemister graft
- Philip II of Macedon, Macedonian king – Philippic.
- Philip II of Spain, Spanish king – Philippines.
- Gerard Philips, Dutch businessman – Philips.
- Émile Picard, French mathematician – Picard horn.
- Mary Pickford, American film actress – Mary Pickford cocktail.
- Samuel Pickwick, British literary character – Pickwickian syndrome.
- Anton Pieck - Dutch illustrator - Pieckian (artwork made in his characteristic style, or reminiscent of 19th-century scenes or fairy tales.)
- Lester Piggott, British horse race jockey – Lester Award.
- Joseph Pilates, German physical trainer – the Pilates Method.
- Józef Piłsudski, Polish general and president – Piłsudskiite.
- James Pimm, British businessman – Pimm's.
- Christopher Pinchbeck, British clockmaker – Pinchbeck. The term "pinchbeck" has entered the English language to signify the alloy Pinchbeck created. Because the alloy could be used to replace gold, the word is also used to signify something less than genuine; a counterfeit; a fake; a sham or fraud.
- Pinocchio, Italian literary character – Pinocchio Syndrome, Pinocchio paradox.
- Harold Pinter, British playwright – Pinteresque.
- Vasja Pirc, Slovenian chess player – Pirc Defence.
- Giovanni Battista Pirelli, Italian businessman and engineer – Pirelli, Pirelli Calendar.
- François Gayot de Pitaval, French lawyer – pitaval.
- William Pitt the Elder, British Prime Minister – Pittsburgh.
- Pius IX, Italian pope – pionono.
- Max Planck, German physicist – Planck constant, Planck's law of black body radiation
- Joseph Plateau, Belgian physicist – Plateau's laws, Plateau's problem.
- Plato, Greek philosopher – Platonic solids, Platonic love, Neoplatonism.
- Samuel Plimsoll, English politician – Plimsoll line, Plimsoll shoe.
- Henry Stanley Plummer, American physician – Plummer's disease, Plummer–Vinson syndrome, Plummer's nail.
- Friedrich Carl Alwin Pockels, German physicist – Pockels effect, Pockels cell.
- Joel Roberts Poinsett, American politician and botanist – poinsettia
- Jean Léonard Marie Poiseuille, French physicist – poise, Poiseuille's Law.
- Joseph Polchinski, American physicist – Polchinski's paradox.
- Marco Polo, Italian explorer – Marco Polo sheep, Marco Polo (game).
- Madame de Pompadour, official chief mistress of King Louis XV - Pompadour (hairstyle).
- Charles Ponzi, Italian criminal – Ponzi scheme.
- Domenico Lorenzo Ponziani, Italian chess player – Ponziani Opening.
- Eugène Poubelle, French lawyer, administrator and diplomat – poubelle, French word for "dustbin".
- Pierre Poujade, French politician – Poujadism.
- Ferdinand Porsche, Italian car designer – Porsche.
- Richard Porson, British scholar - Porson's law or Porson's bridge.
- Grigori Aleksandrovich Potemkin, Russian general – Potemkin village.
- Percivall Pott, British surgeon – Pott's disease, Pott's fracture.
- Pierre Poujade, French politician – Poujadism.
- Enoch Powell, British politician – Powellism.
- Elvis Presley, American rock 'n' roll singer – Elvis impersonator, Elvis taxon, Elvis quiff.
- Priapus, Greek mythological character – priapism.
- Prince Edward, Duke of Kent and Strathearn, British prince – Prince Edward Island.
- Prince Rupert of the Rhine, German prince and inventor – Rupert's Land, Prince Rupert's drop, Prince metal or Prince Rupert metal.
- Procrustes, Greek mythological character – Procrustean bed, Procrustean measures (situations where different lengths or sizes or properties are fitted to an arbitrary standard, often with ruthless disregard of individual differences or special circumstances), Procrustes analysis, Generalized Procrustes analysis, Orthogonal Procrustes problem.
- William Procter and James Gamble, British businesspeople – Procter & Gamble.
- Prometheus, Greek mythological character – Prometheism, Promethium.
- William Prout, British chemist – Prout's hypothesis.
- Joseph Proust, French chemist – Proust's law, Proustite.
- Marcel Proust, French writer – Proustian, Proust Questionnaire.
- Proteus, Greek mythological character – the adjective "protean" (versatile, mutable, capable of assuming many forms), Proteus syndrome, Proteus effect.
- Karl Prusik, Austrian mountaineer – Prusik climbing technique of going up or down a rope using knots.
- Nikolay Przhevalsky, Russisch biologist – Przewalski's horse
- James Puckle, British inventor – Puckle gun.
- Hermann, Fürst von Pückler-Muskau, German prince – Fürst-Pückler-Eis (Prince Pückler ice-cream).
- Carl P. Pulfrich, German physicist - Pulfrich effect.
- Joseph Pulitzer, Hungarian businessman – Pulitzer Prize.
- George Pullman, American businessman and engineer – Pullman sleeping cars.
- Simon Pure, British theatrical character - A simon pure (a pure person, or a superficial, hypocritical person: there are two characters named Simon Pure in the original play A Bold Stroke for a Wife, hence the different definitions).
- Jan Evangelista Purkyně, Czech anatomist and physiologist – Purkinje cell, Purkinje effect, Purkinje shift, Purkinje images, Purkinje fibres.
- Pygmy, Greek mythological characters – Pygmy.
- Pyrene, Greek mythological character – Pyrenees.
- Pyrrho, Greek philosopher – Pyrrhonism.
- Pyrrhus of Epirus, Greek general – Pyrrhic victory
- Pythagoras, Greek mathematician – Pythagorean theorem, Pythagorean triple, Pythagorean tuning, Pythagorean expectation, Pythagorean hammers, Pythagorean trigonometric identity, Pythagoreanism, Neopythagoreanism.
- Python, Greek mythological character – python.

== Q ==
- Graman Quassi, Surinamese botanist – quassia.
- Adolphe Quetelet, Belgian astronomer, mathematician, statistician, sociologist - Quetelet rings, Quetelet Index, Queteleta, Quetelet professor, Quetelet, Queteletia.
- Antoine Quinquet, French pharmacist and inventor – Quinquet lamp.
- Vidkun Quisling, Norwegian war criminal – the term "quisling" became a synonym in many European languages for traitor.

== R ==
- Raël, French religious leader – Raëlism.
- Thomas Stamford Raffles, British governor – Rafflesia.
- FitzRoy Somerset, 1st Baron Raglan, British nobleman and military officer – Raglan sleeve.
- Friedrich Wilhelm Raiffeisen, German businessman – Raiffeisenbank.
- C. V. Raman, Indian physicist – Raman spectroscopy, Raman effect.
- Srinivasa Ramanujan, Indian mathematician – Ramanujan prime, Ramanujan theta function, Ramanujan's sum, Ramanujan's master theorem, Landau–Ramanujan constant, Ramanujan–Soldner constant, Ramanujan–Petersson conjecture, Rogers–Ramanujan identities, Hardy–Ramanujan number.
- John Rambo, American literary and film character – a "Rambo" (a reckless person who disregards orders and uses violence to solve problems), "Rambo strategy", "Rambo lawyer" (one who habitually engages in "all manners of adversarial excess, including personal attacks on other lawyers, hostility, boorish and insulting behavior, rudeness and obstructionist conduct" or embraces "a 'take no prisoners' attitude.",) "Rambo knife" (nickname for a Bowie knife in several languages).
- William John Macquorn Rankine, Scottish engineer, physicist and mathematician – Rankine scale, Rankine cycle.
- Aleksandar Ranković, Yugoslav politician – Rankovićism.
- Raphael, Italian painter – Pre-Raphaelite Brotherhood.
- John William Strutt, 3rd Baron Rayleigh, British physicist and mathematician – Rayleigh criterion, Rayleigh scattering.
- Maurice Raynaud, French physician – Raynaud's disease.
- Ronald Reagan, American film actor and president – Reagan Era, Reaganomics, Reagan Doctrine, Ronald Reagan Washington National Airport, USS Ronald Reagan (CVN-76), Ronald Reagan Trail.
- René Antoine Ferchault de Réaumur, French biologist – degree Réaumur.
- Martin de Redin, Spanish military and politician – De Redin towers.
- Orville Redenbacher, American businessman – Orville Redenbacher.
- Dorothy Reed Mendenhall, American physician, and Carl Sternberg, Austrian pathologist – Reed–Sternberg cell.
- Rehoboam, Hebrew king – 4.5-litre wine bottle (see Wine bottle#Sizes).
- Eliphalet Remington, American businessman – Remington Arms, Remington Products.
- André Renard, Belgian politician – Renardism.
- Louis Renault, French industrialist – Renault.
- Alfréd Rényi, Hungarian mathematician – Rényi entropy.
- Ernst Renz, German circus owner – Circus Renz.
- Richard Réti, Czechoslovak chess player – Réti Opening.
- Nicolas-Edme Rétif, French novelist – retifism.
- Paul Reuter, German-British journalist and businessman – Reuters news agency.
- Douglas Reye, Australian physician – Reye syndrome.
- R. J. Reynolds, American businessman – R. J. Reynolds Tobacco Company.
- Rhea, Greek mythological character – Rhea (a type of bird genus).
- Rhesus of Thrace, Thracian mythological character – rhesus macaque.
- Cecil Rhodes, British explorer and industrialist – Northern Rhodesia (Now Zambia), Southern Rhodesia (Now Zimbabwe), Rhodes Scholarship.
- Giovanni Francesco Ricasoli, Italian knight – Fort Ricasoli.
- Isaac Rice, German-American businessman and chess player – Rice Gambit.
- Nina Ricci, Italian fashion designer – Nina Ricci (brand).
- Charles Richter, American seismologist – Richter magnitude scale.
- Howard Taylor Ricketts, American pathologist – rickettsia.
- Gerrit Rietveld, Dutch architect and furniture designer – Rietveld chair, Gerrit (software), Rietveld (software).
- Sydney Ringer, British pharmacologist – Ringer's solution and Ringer's lactate solution given via the IV route to patients.
- Heinrich Adolf Rinne, German physician – Rinne test.
- Robert L. Ripley, American comics artist – Ripley's Believe It or Not!.
- Eliyahu Rips, Latvian-Israeli mathematician – Rips machine.
- César Ritz, Swiss hotel owner – Ritz Hotel, Hôtel Ritz, "ritzy" (term for something luxurious).
- Ron Rivest, American computer scientist – the first letter of the name RSA (the "R" in this asymmetric algorithm for public key cryptography is taken from Rivest).
- Hal Roach, American film producer – Hal Roach Comedies.
- Jean Robin, French botanist – Robinia.
- Paul Robert, French novelist – Petit Robert.
- Oral Roberts, American evangelist – Oral Roberts University.
- Rocambole, French literary character - rocambolesque (a fantastic adventure reminiscent of the Rocambole novels)
- Yves Rocher, French businessman – Yves Rocher (company).
- John D. Rockefeller, American businessman – Oysters Rockefeller, Rockefeller Foundation.
- John D. Rockefeller Jr., American businessman – Rockefeller Center.
- Nelson Rockefeller, American politician – Rockefeller Republican.
- Norman Rockwell, American painter and illustrator – Rockwellesque.
- Diogo Rodrigues, Portuguese explorer – Rodrigues Island
- Alvah Roebuck and Richard Sears, American businesspeople – Sears, Roebuck, now Sears.
- Francis Rogallo, American aeronautical engineer/inventor - Rogallo wing.
- Leonard James Rogers, British mathematician – Rogers–Ramanujan identity.
- Carl Rogers, American psychologist – Rogerian therapy, or Person-centered therapy
- Roy Rogers, American film actor and singer – Roy Rogers (cocktail).
- Will Rogers, American comedian and actor – Will Rogers phenomenon.
- Otto Röhm and Otto Haas, German businessmen – Rohm & Haas.
- Roland, French knight – "to give a Roland for an Oliver" (offering to give as good as one gets).
- Charles Rolls and Henry Royce, British businesspeople – Rolls-Royce.
- Moritz Heinrich Romberg, German physician – Romberg's test, Parry–Romberg syndrome, Howship–Romberg sign.
- Nicola Romeo, Italian businessman – Alfa Romeo.
- Romulus, Roman mythological character – Rome.
- Vasco Ronchi, Italian physicist – Ronchi test, Ronchi ruling.
- Pierre de Ronsard, French poet – Rosa 'Eden'.
- Wilhelm Röntgen, German inventor – röntgen, unit of dosage of X-rays or gamma radiation.
- Andrés Quintana Roo, Mexican politician – Quintana Roo.
- Alice Roosevelt, American presidential daughter – Alice blue.
- Theodore Roosevelt, American president – Teddy bear.
- Hermann Rorschach, Swiss psychiatrist and psychoanalyst – Rorschach test.
- Gioacchino Rossini, Italian composer – Tournedos Rossini.
- Eugène Rousseau, French chess player – Rousseau Gambit.
- Henry Isaac Rowntree, British businessman – Rowntree's.
- Henry Royce and Charles Rolls, British businesspeople – Rolls–Royce.
- Ruaidhrí mac Raghnaill, Hebridean magnate, Clann Ruaidhrí.
- Peter Paul Rubens, Flemish painter – Rubenesque (term used to describe chubby, obese women).
- Ernő Rubik, Hungarian inventor – Rubik's Cube, Rubik's Clock, Rubik's Magic, Rubik's Revenge.
- Heinrich Daniel Ruhmkorff, German inventor – Ruhmkorff commutator, Ruhmkorff coil.
- Rumpelstiltskin, German fairy tale character – Rumpelstiltskin principle.
- Johan Ludwig Runeberg, Finnish poet – Runeberg torte.
- Carle David Tolmé Runge, German mathematician and physicist – Runge's phenomenon.
- Damon Runyon, American journalist and writer – Runyonesque, Damon Runyon Stakes, Damon Runyon character
- Bertrand Russell, British philosopher – Russell's paradox, Russell's teapot.
- Jim Russell, Australian cartoonist – Jim Russell Award.
- Reverend John Russell, British reverend and businessman – Jack Russell Terrier.
- Henry Norris Russell, American astronomer, and Ejnar Hertzsprung, Danish astronomer – Hertzsprung–Russell diagram
- Lord Rutherford, New Zealand physicist – rutherfordium.
- Johannes Rydberg, Swedish physicist – Rydberg constant, Rydberg formula, Rydberg unit, Rydberg atoms.
- Herbert John Ryser, American mathematician – Ryser's formula.

== S ==
- Sabellius, Christian theologist – Sabellianism
- Franz Sacher, Austrian confectioner – Sachertorte
- Leopold von Sacher-Masoch, German novelist – masochism
- Marquis de Sade, French novelist – sadism
- Sheikh Safi-ad-din Ardabili, Persian sheikh – Safavid dynasty, Safavids
- Charles Frederick Morris Saint, British surgeon – Saint's triad, a medical counterexample to Ockham's razor
- Claude Henri de Saint-Simon, French philosopher – Saint-Simonianism.
- Ulrich Salchow, Swedish figure skater – Salchow, figure skating jump
- Daniel Elmer Salmon, American pathologist – salmonella.
- Raimondo di Sangro, Prince of Sanseviero, Italian nobleman and alchemist – sanseveria.
- Shalmaneser V, Biblical king – 9-litre wine bottle (see Wine bottle#Sizes)
- Vasili Samarsky-Bykhovets, a Russian mine official – samarskite, the mineral after which the chemical element samarium has been named.
- Augusto Sandino, Nicaraguan president – Sandinism.
- John Montagu, 4th Earl of Sandwich, British earl – sandwiches and South Sandwich Islands.
- Thomas Sankara, Burkinabé president – Sankarism.
- Matthew Henry Phineas Riall Sankey, Irish civil engineer – Sankey diagram.
- Rick Santorum, American politician – spreading santorum
- Edward Sapir, American anthropologist – Sapir-Whorf hypothesis
- Sappho, Greek poet – sapphism (lesbianism), Sapphic stanza.
- Pierre-Auguste Sarrus, French inventor – Sarrusophone.
- Satan, Biblical character – Satanism, Satan's bolete
- Satyr, Greek mythological characters – satire.
- Muhammad bin Saud, Saudi royal – Saudi Arabia.
- Thomas Savery, British inventor and engineer - Savery engine.
- Sigurd Johannes Savonius, Finnish inventor and architect – Savonius wind turbine
- Adolphe Sax, Belgian inventor – saxophone.
- Bartolus de Saxoferrato, Spanish jurist – Bartolism.
- Gerald G. Schaber, American geologist - Schaber hill (also known as the North Complex, north of the landing site of Apollo 15).
- Wilhelm Schlenk, German chemist – Schlenk flask, Schlenk line.
- Alfred von Schlieffen, German general – Schlieffen Plan
- Schmendrick, Russian theatrical character - schmendrick (a pathethic or stupid person).
- Bernhard Schmidt, German optician and inventor – Schmidt camera, aka "Schmidt telescope".
- Walter H. Schottky, German physicist – Schottky diode.
- Johann Schrammel and Josef Schrammel, Austrian violinists – Schrammelmusik.
- Erwin Schrödinger, Austrian physicist – Schrödinger equation, Schrödinger's cat, Schrödinger's Kittens – a book.
- Giovanni Antonio Scopoli, Italian botanist and biologist – scopolamine.
- Edward W. Scott, American businessman – The second letter of the company name BEA Systems, is taken from his first name.
- Robert Scott, British explorer – Amundsen–Scott South Pole Station
- Ebenezer Scrooge, British literary character – scrooge (a stingy miser)
- Glenn T. Seaborg, American physicist and chemist – seaborgium.
- Ronald Searle, British cartoonist and illustrator - Searle-esque (artwork reminiscent of his characteristic graphic style)
- Richard Sears and Alvah Roebuck, American businessmen – Sears, Roebuck; stores bear only the Sears name
- Chief Seattle, Native American tribal leader – City of Seattle
- Laura Secord, Canadian national heroine – Laura Secord Chocolates
- Thomas Johann Seebeck, German physicist – Seebeck effect
- Josef Sekanina, Czech mineralogist – mineral Sekaninaite.
- Haile Selassie, Ethiopian emperor – Rastafari (which is derived from his real name: Ras Tafari Makonnen).
- Harry Gordon Selfridge, American business man – Selfridges
- Edgar Selwyn and Archibald Selwyn, American film producers who used the last three letters of their name along with the first four of Samuel Goldfish to create Goldwyn Picture Corporation, which later merged into Metro–Goldwyn–Mayer (or MGM)
- Ignaz Semmelweis, Hungarian physician – Semmelweis reflex.
- Claude de la Sengle, Maltese knight – Senglea
- The Serendip princes, Indian fairy tale characters – serendipity
- Sequoyah, American–Cherokee silversmith – Sequoia (genus), Sequoyah County, Oklahoma.
- Dr. Seuss, American children's writer and poet - Seussian (a narrative reminiscent of his writing style).
- Carl Keenan Seyfert, American astronomer - Seyfert's Sextet.
- Max Shachtman, American politician – Shachtmanism.
- William Shakespeare, British playwright – Shakespearean, Shakespearean actor, Shakespearean age, Shakespeare quadrangle, Shakespeare (programming language),
- Adi Shamir, Israeli computer scientist – the second letter of the name RSA, an asymmetric algorithm for public key cryptography, is taken from Shamir.
- Shem, Biblical character – semitism.
- Roger Shepard, American cognitive scientist – Shepard tone.
- Reginald V. Shepherd and Harold Turpin, American inventors – sten gun (derived from their last names).
- William Tecumseh Sherman, American general – Sherman necktie, Shermanesque statement, Sherman tank.
- Beatrice Shilling, aviation engineering researcher – Miss Shilling's orifice, a device to ensure fuel flow in aero-engines when in a dive.
- Shiva, Indian mythological character – Shaivism
- Shmoo, American comics character – Shmoo plot
- Henry S. Shrapnel, British general and inventor – shrapnel.
- Henry Miller Shreve, American inventor and steamboat captain – Shreveport, Louisiana.
- Jean Sibelius, Finnish composer – Sibelius notation program, Sibelius Software Ltd
- Werner von Siemens, German business man – siemens, Siemens.
- Rolf Sievert, Swedish physicist – sievert (unit of radiation dose equivalent).
- Norodom Sihanouk, Cambodian king – Sihanoukism.
- Etienne de Silhouette, French politician – silhouette
- Leon "Lee" Silver, American geologist - Silver spur (a lunar mountain east of Mons Hadley Delta, south of the landing site of Apollo 15)
- Simon Magus or "Simon the Magician", Biblical character – simony
- Issac Merritt Singer, American inventor – Singer Corporation
- Sisyphus, Greek mythological character – Sisyphus beetle, Sisyphus effect, Sisyphism.
- Sixtus IV, Italian pope – Sistine Chapel.
- Henrik Sjögren, Swedish physician – Sjögren's syndrome
- Alexander Skene, Scottish gynaecologist – Skene's gland
- BF Skinner, American psychologist – Skinner box
- Emil Škoda, Czech car designer – Škoda
- Delia Smith, British cook – Delia effect
- Horace Smith and Daniel B. Wesson, American gun inventors – Smith & Wesson
- Maria Ann Smith, British-Australian businesswoman – Granny Smith
- William Smith, English geologist – Smith's laws
- Edward Smith-Stanley, 12th Earl of Derby, British nobleman – Derby (horse race), particularly The Derby
- Oliver R. Smoot, American student – smoot.
- The Smurfs, Belgian comics characters – Smurf (Smurf language), Smurf attack, Smurfing.
- Hermann Snellen, Dutch ophthmalmologist – Snellen chart
- Willebrord Snellius, Dutch astronomer and mathematician – Snell's law
- Socrates, Greek philosopher – Socratic Method, Socratic dialogue.
- Alexey Sokolsky, Ukrainian-Belarusian chess player – Sokolsky Opening
- Sól, Norse mythological character – Sunday.
- Daniel Solander, Swedish botanist – Solander box
- Solomon, Biblical character – Judgement of Solomon, Solomon Islands.
- Ernest Solvay, Belgian chemist, industrialist, philanthropist and politician – Solvay process, Solvay, Solvay Institute of Sociology, Solvay Brussels School of Economics and Management, Solvay Process Company, Solvay Conference, Solvay Hut, Solvay, Solvay, Rosignano Solvay.
- Somhairle mac Giolla Brighde, King of the Isles, Clann Somhairle
- Sondermann, German comics character – Sondermann Award.
- John Sotheby, British businessman – Sotheby's.
- John Philip Sousa, American composer – sousaphone
- Edwin Southern, British biologist – Southern blot.
- Paul-Henri Spaak, Belgian politician and diplomat – Spaak method.
- Spartacus, Thracian resistance leader – Spartacus League.
- George Spencer, 2nd Earl Spencer, British politician – Spencer (clothing)
- Thomas Spencer, British business people – Marks and Spencer
- Edmund Spenser, British playwright – Spenserian stanza.
- Steven Spielberg, American film director - Spielbergian, Spielberg-esque.
- Baruch Spinoza, Dutch philosopher – Spinozism.
- William Archibald Spooner, British teacher – spoonerism.
- Alexsei Grigoryevich Stakhanov, Soviet miner – Stakhanovite.
- Konstantin Stanislavski, Russian playwright – Stanislavski's system.
- Frederick Trent Stanley, American inventor – Stanley knife.
- Joseph Stalin, Russian head of state – Stalinism and neo-Stalinism (also see De-Stalinization), see List of places named after Joseph Stalin, Joseph Stalin Museum, Stalinist architecture, Stalin Society, Stalin Prize, Stalin Peace Prize, Iosif Stalin tank
- Johannes Stark, German physicist – Stark spectroscopy, Stark effect
- Howard Staunton, British chess player – Staunton Gambit.
- Jozef Stefan and Ludwig Boltzmann, Austrian physicists – Stefan–Boltzmann constant.
- Stendhal, French novelist – Stendhal syndrome.
- Édouard Stephan, French astronomer - Stephan's Quintet.
- George Stephenson, British inventor – Geordie lamp.
- Charles Stent, British dentist – a "stent" (tooth filling)
- Stentor, Greek mythological character – stentorian (being loud-voiced)
- John B. Stetson, American inventor – Stetson hat.
- John K. Stewart and Arthur P. Warner, American business people – Stewart–Warner
- Helmut Stief, German inventor – Stiefografie.
- Thomas Joannes Stieltjes, Dutch mathematician Riemann–Stieltjes integral.
- Robert Stirling, Scottish inventor – Stirling engine.
- James Cyril Stobie, South Australian engineer - Stobie pole.
- George Gabriel Stokes, Irish physicist and mathematician – stokes, unit of viscosity
- Marshall Harvey Stone, American mathematician – Stone–von Neumann theorem, Stone–Čech compactification, Stone's representation theorem for Boolean algebras, Stone space, Stone–Weierstrass theorem, Stone's representation theorem for distributive lattices, Stone duality, Stone's theorem on one-parameter unitary groups, Banach–Stone theorem
- Antonio Stradivari, Italian violin builder – Stradivari.
- Gregor Strasser, German politician – Strasserism.
- Leo Strauss, German-American philosopher – Straussianism.
- Levi Strauss, American business man – Levi Strauss & Co.
- William Strauss, American historian – Strauss-Howe generational theory
- Barbra Streisand, American actress and singer – Streisand effect (censorship that has the unintended consequence of publicizing the information more widely.)
- Count Stroganov (possibly Alexander Stroganov or Count Grigory Stroganov), Russian aristocrat – Stroganoff
- John McDouall Stuart, Scottish explorer – Stuart Highway, Central Mount Stuart
- Rashid Sunyaev and Yakov B. Zel'dovich, Russian physicists – Sunyaev–Zel'dovich effect
- Michio Suzuki, Japanese business man – Suzuki.
- Shinichi Suzuki, Japanese musicologist and violinist – Suzuki method.
- Sage Kambu Swayambhuva, Indian mythological character – Cambodia
- Theodor Svedberg, Swedish chemist – svedberg (unit of sedimentation rate)
- Svengali, British literary character – a svengali (one who manipulates or controls somebody), Svegali defense.
- Gordon Swann, American geologist — Swann range (a section of the Montes Apenninus on the moon, east of the landing site of Apollo 15)
- Daniel Swarovski, Bohemian-born Austrian glass cutter and jeweler - Swarovski
- Thomas Townshend, viscount of Sydney, British politician – Sydney, Nova Scotia, Canada and Sydney, Australia.
- Sylvester I, Italian pope – Saint Sylvester's Day.
- Syphilus, character in Girolamo Fracastoro's poem Syphilis sive morbus gallicus – syphilis.
- Syrinx, Greek mythological character – syringe, "syrinx" (singing organ of songbirds).

== T ==
- Tages, Etruscan prophet – tagetes.
- William Henry Fox Talbot, British inventor – Talbotype, Talbot effect.
- Chairul Tanjung, Indonesian businessman – CT Corp
- James Mourilyan Tanner, British paediatrician – Tanner stage.
- Quentin Tarantino, American film director - Tarantino-esque (films reminiscent of his characteristic style)
- Tarik-ibn-Ziyad (from Arabic djebl al-Tarik or "mountain of Tarik"), Muslim commander – Gibraltar.
- Siegbert Tarrasch, German chess player – Tarrasch Defense, Tarrasch Trap, Tarrasch rule.
- Tarzan, British literary character – Tarzanesque, Tarzan yell, Tarzan pants (loin cloth in leopard motif).
- Abel Tasman, Dutch explorer – Tasmania, Tasman Sea, Tasman Region, Abel Tasman National Park, Tasman Bay.
- J. R. D. Tata, French-Indian aviator and businessman – Tata.
- Jacques Tati, French film director and comedian - Tati-esque (comedy films reminiscent of his trademark style).
- Saint Tatiana, Roman Christian saint – Tatiana Day.
- Stéphanie Tatin and Caroline Tatin, French restaurant owners – Tarte Tatin.
- Frederick Winslow Taylor, American engineer – Taylorism.
- Shirley Temple, American film actress – Shirley Temple Soda.
- Terry-Thomas, British actor and comedian – Terry Thomas sign.
- Nikola Tesla, Serbian-Croatian inventor – Tesla coil, tesla – unit of magnetic flux density.
- Luisa Tetrazzini, Italian operatic soprano – Chicken Tetrazzini
- Osamu Tezuka, Japanese manga (comics) artist – Tezuka Osamu Cultural Prize, Tezuka Award.
- Thanatos, Greek mythological character – thanatophobia, thanatology, thanatophoric dysplasia, euthanasia, thanatosensitivity, thanatosis.
- Margaret Thatcher, British Prime Minister – Thatcherism, Thatcher illusion.
- Theia, Greek mythological character – Theia, a hypothesized ancient planet.
- Leon Theremin, Russian inventor – Theremin, Theremin cello.
- Thespis, Greek actor – thespian, thespis (plant), thespis (mantis), thespis wagon.
- Lou Thesz, American wrestler – Lou Thesz press.
- W. I. Thomas and Dorothy Swaine Thomas, American sociologists – Thomas theorem.
- Thor, Norse mythological character – thorium.
- August Thyssen, German businessman – Thyssen, ThyssenKrupp.
- Ting Hai, Hong Kong film character – Ting Hai effect.
- Tinker Bell, British literary character – Tinkerbell effect.
- Tintin, Belgian comics character – Tintin trousers
- Titan, Greek mythological character – RMS Titanic, titanium.
- Christopher Titus – Titus, an Emmy nominated TV series broadcast on FOX from 2000 to 2002.
- Johann Daniel Titius and Johann Elert Bode, German astronomers – Titius–Bode Law.
- Josip Broz Tito, Yugoslav president – titoism, Titovka (cap).
- Saint Thomas, Biblical character – a "disbelieving/doubting Thomas" (someone who lacks faith), São Tomé and Príncipe, Saint Thomas Tower.
- John T. Thompson, American inventor – Thompson submachine gun, aka the "Tommy gun".
- James Tobin, American economist – Tobin tax.
- J.R.R. Tolkien, South-African/British novelist – Tolkienology.
- Lorenzo de Tonti, Italian businessman – tontine.
- Marten Toonder - Dutch comic writer and artist - Toonderian (language reminiscent of his trademark style)
- Howard Henry Tooth, British neurologist – Charcot–Marie–Tooth disease.
- Carlos Torre Repetto – Torre Attack.
- Evangelista Torricelli, Italian mathematician and inventor – torr (unit of pressure), Torricelli's Law, Torricelli's equation.
- Linus Torvalds, Finnish computer programmer – Linus's law, Linux operating system (from Linus' Minix), Tux – mascot of Linux (from Torvald's Unix).
- Charles Townshend, British politician – Townshend Acts.
- Arnold Toynbee, British economist – Toynbee Hall.
- Sakichi Toyoda, Japanese businessman – Toyota.
- Trajan, Roman emperor – Trajan's Column, Trajan's Wall.
- Friedrich Trautwein, German inventor - Trautonium.
- Trillian, British literary character – Trillian (software), Project Trillian.
- Octavio Trompowsky, Brazilian chess player – Trompowsky Attack.
- Leon Trotsky, Russian politician and writer – Trotskyism
- Harry S. Truman, American president – Truman Doctrine
- Donald Trump, American businessman and politician – Trumpism, Trump Tower, the Trump International Hotel and Tower, Trump Plaza etc.
- Mikhail Tugan-Baranovsky, Russian economist – Tugan-Baranovskii theory of business cycles
- Túpac Amaru II, Peruvian resistance leader – Tupamaros.
- Alan Turing, British mathematician and inventor – Turing machine, Turing-complete, Turing tarpit, Turing test, Church–Turing thesis, Church–Turing–Deutsch principle.
- J. M. W. Turner, English painter – Turner Prize
- Ted Turner, American business man – Turner Entertainment, Turner Classic Movies, Turner Broadcasting System or TBS, TBS Superstation, WTBS, Turner Network Television or TNT, Turner Tomorrow Fellowship Award.
- Mr Turveydrop, a character in Charles Dickens's Bleak House - a Turveydrop (a person posing as a model of deportment).
- Marie Tussaud, French sculptor – Madame Tussauds.
- Maurice Tweedie, physicist and statistician – Tweedie distribution.

== U ==
- Antonio de Ulloa, Spanish naval officer, scientist, and administrator - Ulloa's circle (also known as Bouguer's halo and the Fog bow)
- Uranus, Greek-Roman mythological character – uranium, the planet Uranus, Uranian (sexuality), Uranians.
- Urhunden, Swedish comics character – Urhunden Prize
- Saint Ursula, Christian martyr – Ursulines

== V ==
- Saint Valentine, Roman martyr – Valentine's Day.
- Rudolph Valentino, Italian-American actor – Valentino's syndrome.
- Jean Parisot de Valette, French nobleman – Valletta.
- Antonio Maria Valsalva, Italian physician – Valsalva maneuver, Valsalva device.
- Vanadis, synonym for the Norse mythological character Freyja – vanadium.
- James Van Allen, American astronomer – Van Allen radiation belt.
- George Vancouver, British explorer – Vancouver, British Columbia, Vancouver, Washington, Vancouver Island.
- Constant Vanden Stock, Belgian association football player and manager – Constant Vanden Stock Stadium.
- Johannes Diderik van der Waals, Dutch physicist – Van der Waals force.
- Robert J. Van de Graaff, American physicist – Van de Graaff generator.
- Adriaan van Maanen, Dutch-American astronomer - van Maanen's star.
- Dolly Varden, British literary character (from Charles Dickens' Barnaby Rudge) – Dolly Varden (costume).
- Harry Vardon, British golfer – Vardon grip.
- Publius Quinctilius Varus, Roman general – Varian disaster (The Battle of the Teutoburg Forest).
- Rip Van Winkle, American literary character – a "rip van winkle" (someone who sleeps too much.)
- Philippe de Vendôme, French nobleman – Place Vendôme, Vendôme Tower, Vendôme Battery, Vendôme Redoubt
- Saint Venera, Italian Christian martyr. – Santa Venera, Santa Venerina, Santa Verna.
- Eleftherios Venizelos, Greek politician – Venizelism.
- John Venn, British mathematician – Venn diagram.
- Giovanni Battista Venturi, Italian physicist - Venturi effect.
- Venus, Greek-Roman mythological character – Venus (planet), mons veneris or mons Venus, venereal disease, Venus flytrap, Venus symbol, Belt of Venus.
- Hugues Loubenx de Verdalle, Maltese bishop – Verdala Palace.
- Pierre-Théodore Verhaegen, Belgian lawyer and politician – Saint Verhaegen
- Jules Verne, French novelist – Verneshot.
- Pierre Vernier, French mathematician – Vernier scale.
- Edward Vernon, British naval officer, whose nickname was "Old Grog" – "groggy", Mount Vernon
- Vespasian, Roman emperor – vespasienne.
- Amerigo Vespucci, Italian explorer – America.
- Vesta, Roman mythological character – Vestalia, Vestal virgin, Vesta case.
- Victoria, Roman mythological character – victory.
- Queen Victoria, British queen – Queensland, Victoria, Australia, Victoria, British Columbia, Victoria Island, Victoria Strait, Great Victoria Desert, Lake Victoria, Victoria, Gozo, Victoria Harbour, London Victoria station, Victoria line, Victorian era, Queen Victoria Street, London, Victoria Cross, Victoria Land, Victoria Tower, Royal Victoria Dock, Victoria and Albert Museum, Victorian architecture, Victorian house, Victoria, Seychelles, Victoria Lines, Victoria plum, Victoria sponge cake
- António Manoel de Vilhena, Portuguese nobleman – Fort Manoel, Manoel Island, Manoel Theatre.
- Saint Vincent, Christian martyr – Saint Vincent and the Grenadines.
- Leonardo da Vinci, Italian artist and scientist – Leonardeschi, Davinciite, Davincia, Da Vinci Machine.
- Virgil, Roman poet – Sortes Vergilianae, Virgilian.
- Artturi Ilmari Virtanen, Finnish chemist – AIV fodder.
- Andrew Viterbi, Italian-American engineer – Viterbi algorithm, Viterbi decoder.
- Vitruvius, Roman architect – Vitruvian Man.
- Vishnu, Hindu deity – Vaishnavism.
- Alessandro Volta, Italian physicist – the volt, a unit of electromotive force, voltage, the Volta Prize.
- Vulcan, Greek–Roman mythological character – volcano.
- Vulcans, American television characters – Vulcan salute.

== W ==
- Barnes Wallis, British inventor – Barnes Wallis Moth Machine (not invented by him, but named after him.)
- Robert Wade, New Zealand-British chess player – Wade Defence
- Richard Wagner, German composer – Wagnerian, Wagner tuba
- Muhammad ibn Abd al-Wahhab, Saudi Arabian theologist – Wahhabi movement
- Alfred Russel Wallace, Welsh biologist – Wallace Line, Wallace's flying frog, Operation Wallacea, Wallacea
- Peter Waldo, French religious leader – Waldensians
- Samuel Wallis, British explorer– Wallis and Futuna
- Egide Walschaerts, Belgian engineer – Walschaerts valve gear
- Walpurga, English missionary – Walpurgis Night
- Adam Walsh, American rape and murder victim – Code Adam
- Sam Walton, American businessman – Walmart and Sam's Club
- Preston Ware, American chess player – Ware Opening
- Albert Warner, Harold Warner, Jack L. Warner and Sam Warner, American film producers – Warner Bros.
- Arthur P. Warner and John K. Stewart, American businesspeople – Stewart–Warner
- Earl Warren, American chief of justice – Warren Commission
- George Washington, American general and president – Washington and Washington, D.C.
- Karlman Wasserman, American physiologist — Wasserman 9-Panel Plot
- James Watt, Scottish inventor – watt
- Thomas William Webb, British astronomer - Webb's wreath (a telescopic asterism in the constellation Hercules, called Webb's wreath by amateur astronomers)
- Ernst Heinrich Weber, German psychologist – Weber's law, Weber test, Weberian apparatus
- Wilhelm Eduard Weber, German physicist – weber
- Friedrich Wegener, German pathologist – Wegener's granulomatosis (not discovered by him, now known as granulomatosis with polyangiitis)
- Peter J. Weinberger – the second letter of the name awk, a computer pattern/action language, is taken from Weinberger
- August Weismann, German biologist – Weismannism
- Sam Weller, British literary character – wellerism
- Duke of Wellington, British general and Prime Minister – Beef Wellington, Wellington boot, Wellington (New Zealand), Wellingtonia (tree)
- H. G. Wells, British novelist – Wellsian (science fiction stories reminiscent of his style)
- Eudora Welty, American novelist – Eudora, an e-mail client.
- Carl Wernicke, German neurologist – Wernicke's aphasia, Wernicke's area, Wernicke encephalopathy, Wernicke–Korsakoff syndrome.
- Werther, German literary character – Werther effect.
- Mae West, American actress – Mae West jacket
- Thomas West, 3rd Baron De La Warr, British politician – Delaware
- Thomas Aldridge Weston, American inventor – Weston differential pulley
- George Whipple, American physician – Whipple's disease
- Joseph Whitworth, British engineer – Whitworth rifle
- Frederick Methvan Whyte, American engineer – Whyte notation
- Knut Wicksell, Swedish economist – Wicksell effect, Wicksell's theory of capital
- Wilhelm Wien, Russian mathematician – Wien's displacement law
- Alof de Wignacourt, French-Maltese nobleman – Wignacourt Aqueduct, Wignacourt towers, Wignacourt Tower
- Eugene Wigner, Hungarian-American mathematician – Wigner's friend
- Paul Wild, British-born Australian scientist - Wild's Triplet
- Private Wilhelm, American film character from the film The Charge at Feather River (1953) – Wilhelm scream
- Erik Adolf von Willebrand, Finnish physician – Von Willebrand disease, Von Willebrand factor
- Jan Frans Willems, Belgian writer and activist – Willemsfonds
- Max Wilms, German physician – Wilms' tumor
- Charles Thomson Rees Wilson, Scottish physician – Wilson cloud chamber, Wilson condensation cloud
- Samuel Alexander Kinnier Wilson, American-British physician – Wilson's disease, Wilson disease protein
- Oliver Winchester, American inventor – Winchester rifle
- Winnie-the-Pooh, British literary character - poohsticks.
- Caspar Wistar, American physicist – Wisteria
- William Withering, British botanist – witherite
- Georg Wittig, German chemist – Wittig reaction
- Władysław II Jagiełło, Polish king – Jagiellonian University
- Max Wolf, Knut Lundmark, Philibert Jacques Melotte, astronomers - Wolf-Lundmark-Melotte (WLM) system, a barred irregular galaxy at the outer edges of the Local Group
- Caspar Friedrich Wolff, German physiologist – Wolffian duct
- Robert W. Wood, American physicist - Wood's Spot, a yellowish colored area on the moon (northwest of crater Aristarchus).
- Frank Winfield Woolworth, American businessman – Woolworth Building.
- Woozle, British literary character - Woozle effect.
- Ferdinand von Wrangel, German explorer – Wrangel Island
- Doug Wright, Canadian cartoonist – Doug Wright Award
- Josef Wronski, Polish mathematician – Wronskian
- Charles Adolphe Wurtz, French chemist – Wurtz reaction, Wurtzite

== X ==
- Xanthippe, wife of Greek philosopher Socrates – xanthippe (dominant, difficult female partner), Xanthippe's shrew
- Anthony Xerri, Maltese man who discovered a cave – Xerri's Grotto
- Francisco Ximénez de Tejada, Maltese religious leader – Ximenes Redoubt

== Y ==
- The Yellow Kid, American comics character – yellow journalism, Yellow Kid Award.
- Pops Yoshimura, Japanese businessman – Yoshimura motorcycle tuning company
- Thomas Young, British scientist – Young's modulus and Young's slits

== Z ==
- Walter J. Zable, American businessman and football player – Zable Stadium for college football
- Frank J. Zamboni, Italian-American inventor – Zamboni ice resurfacer
- Emiliano Zapata, Mexican revolutionary – zapatista
- Frank Zappa, American rock artist and composer – Zappaesque
- Mao Zedong, Chinese head of state – maoism
- Pieter Zeeman, Dutch physicist – Zeeman effect
- Eduard Zeis, German physician – glands of Zeis
- Helmut Zeisel, German mathematician – Zeisel number
- Martin Zelder, American economist – Zelder paradox
- Zeno of Elea, Greek philosopher – Paradox of Zeno
- Zephyr, Greek mythological character – zephyr
- Ferdinand von Zeppelin, German inventor – zeppelin
- Zog I of Albania, Albanian king – Zogist salute.
- Zoroaster, Persian religious leader – Zoroastrianism
- Fritz Zwicky, Swiss astronomer - Zwicky's Triplet
- Huldrich Zwingli, Swiss religious leader – Zwinglianism

== See also ==
- Lists of etymologies
