= Torsion dystonia =

Hereditary disease

- Other names: Dystonia musculorum deformans
- Specialty: Neurology

Torsion dystonia, also known as dystonia musculorum deformans, is a disease characterized by painful muscle contractions resulting in uncontrollable distortions. This specific type of dystonia is frequently found in children, with symptoms starting around the ages of 11 or 12. It commonly begins with contractions in one general area such as an arm or a leg that continue to progress throughout the rest of the body. It takes roughly 5 years for the symptoms to completely progress to a debilitating state.

== Causes ==
The disease is caused by a genetic disorder which results in a defect in a protein called Torsin A. A mutation in the DYT1 gene causes the loss of an amino acid, glutamic acid, in the Torsin A protein. Torsin A is an evolutionarily conserved AAA+ ATPase. The defective protein disrupts communication in neurons that control muscle movement and muscle control. This mutation is most usually inherited from a parent but can occur spontaneously. The disease is caused by a dominant allele, meaning that the person affected needs only one copy of the mutated DYT1 gene to have symptoms. However, only 30 to 40 percent of those that do have the gene actually have symptoms, leading researchers to believe that there are other factors involved.

== Diagnosis ==
=== Classification ===
Several types of torsion dystonia affect different areas of the body. However, it is unknown if the gene that causes Early-onset torsion dystonia is responsible for the other dystonias as well.

- Cervical dystonia (spasmodic torticollis): A type of dystonia that affects the head, neck and spine. It can create problems by the characteristic turning of the head and neck from side to side.
- Blepharospasm: This type of dystonia causes involuntary contraction of the eyelids. The main concern for this dystonia is that it can cause the eyelids to close involuntarily and for indefinite periods of time.
- Oromandibular dystonia: A dystonia of the jaw, lips, and/or the tongue. It can make eating and swallowing very complicated due to the jaw being held open or shut for periods of time.
- Spasmodic dysphonia: A dystonia of the vocal cords. The complications surrounding this form of dystonia are speech-related and can cause symptoms such as speech that wavers, speech that sounds like a whisper, or speech that is hesitant.
- Writer's cramp (occupational dystonia): A dystonia that affects the muscles of the hand and forearm. It is triggered by attempting to write or execute other fine-motor hand functions.
- Orofacial-Buccal dystonia (Meige's or Brueghal's Syndrome): A combination of blepharospasm and oromandibular dystonia.
- Early-onset torsion dystonia: The most severe type of dystonia, it begins in an arm or leg and progresses to the rest of the body until the person — in most cases, a child — is reliant on a wheelchair.

== Treatment ==
There is no cure for torsion dystonia. However, there are several medical approaches that can lessen the symptoms of the disease. The treatment must be patient-specific, taking into consideration all of the previous and current health complications. The doctor who creates the treatment must have intimate knowledge of the patient's health and create a treatment plan that covers all of the symptoms, focusing on the most chronic areas.

The first step for most with the disorder is some form of physical therapy in order for the patient to gain more control over the affected areas. The therapy can help patients with their posture and gain control over the areas of their body that they have the most problems with.

The second step in the treatment process is medication. The medications focus on neurotransmitters that control muscle movement. The medications on the market today are anticholinergics, benzodiazepines, baclofen, dopaminergic agents/dopamine-depleting agents, and tetrabenazine. Each medication is started on a low dosage and gradually increased to higher doses as the disease progresses and the side effects are known for the individual.

A more site-specific treatment is the injection of botulinum toxin. It is injected directly into the muscle and works by preventing the release of acetylcholine, resulting in flaccid paralysis of the muscle. The injections are not a treatment for the disease but are a means to control its symptoms.

Surgery may be considered for patients who do not respond to oral medications or injections. The type of surgery performed is specific to the type of dystonia that the patient has. A systematic review found that some patients benefit from deep brain stimulation (DBS) surgery, but the studies may have been subject to financial bias.

== Prevalence ==
The disease is more commonly found amongst Ashkenazi Jews. The occurrence of torsion dystonia in the Ashkenazi Jewish population as stated by the Department of Epidemiology and Public Health of Yale University School of Medicine in New Haven, Connecticut; "Reports dating to the beginning of this century describe Ashkenazi Jewish (AJ) families with multiple cases of ITD either in siblings (Schwalbe 1908; Bernstein 1912; Abrahamson 1920) or in parents and offspring (Wechsler and Brock 1922; Mankowsky and Czerny 1929; Regensberg 1930). The first comprehensive evaluation of the mode of inheritance of ITD in Jewish and non-Jewish families was described by Zeman and Dyken (1967), who concluded that the disorder was inherited as an autosomal dominant with incomplete penetrance in both populations. Although they concluded that the gene frequency was higher in the AJ population than in non-Jews, no difference in the mode of inheritance or disease mechanism was construed."

== Research ==
A 1969 study of torsion dystonia patients found an average IQ 10 points higher than controls matched for age, sex, and ethnic background.
