= Guo Musical Instrument Company =

Guo Musical Instrument Company (GMIC) is a Taiwan-based musical instrument manufacturer, specializing in flutes, piccolos, flute head joints, and saxophone necks and head joints. Founded by Geoffrey Guo in 1988, GMIC offers its products for sale online and through various retailers all over the world. Some of its instruments include a tenor flute, a G soprano flute, grenaditte flutes, and a new C flute design called a Tocco flute. Many of these models of flutes and piccolos come in many different colors.

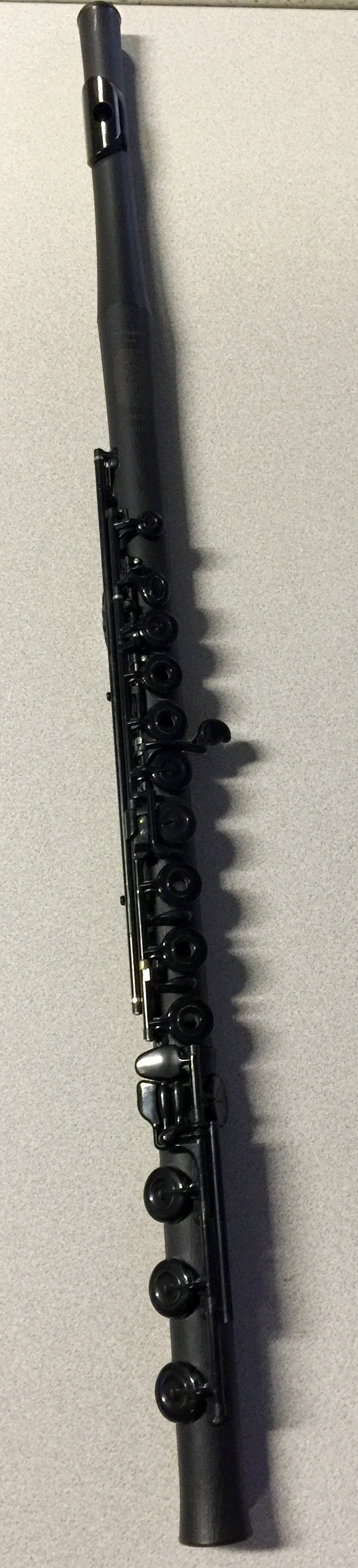
Guo Grenaditte Flute in the key of C.

In 2004, Geoffrey Guo and flute professor Mark Dannenbring developed the grenaditte flute. This lightweight, plastic flute enabled Dannenbring, who suffered from focal dystonia, to return to the concert setting. GMIC also claims that the grenaditte flute is impervious to weather, environmentally friendly, and easy to maintain. The grenaditte flute is also ideal for those who experience shoulder pains or RSI with a metal flute.

In 2009 GMIC introduced the New Voice flute, which is smaller and lighter than the grenaditte flute, and offered in a wide array of colors, as opposed to the grenaditte's black/gray color.

In 2012 they released the Tocco flute, which has received a reddot Award 2014 Honourable Mention for New Design.

== Models ==
- AME Standard Flute
- FiFe+
- Grenaditte Flute
- Grenaditte G Flute
- Grenaditte Tenor Flute
- Grenaditte Alto Flute
- New Voice Alto Flute
- New Voice D’Amore Flute
- Grenaditte Alto Flute
- Grenaditte D’Amore Flute
- Grenaditte Piccolo Flute
- New Voice G Flute
- New Voice Piccolo Flute
- New Voice Tenor Flute
- New Voice Flute
- Tocco Flute
- Tocco Plus Flute

== Head Joints and Accessories ==
- Dynalance Head Joint
- Executor Head Joint
- New Voice Head Joint
- Grenaditte Head Joint
- Saxophone Neck
- Saxophone End-Plug
