= Focal dystonia =

Nerve disorder affecting certain muscle(s) during specific activities

A person with medication-induced dystonia

Focal dystonia, also called focal task-specific dystonia, a form of dystonia, is a neurological condition that affects a muscle or group of muscles in a specific part of the body during specific activities, causing involuntary muscular contractions (spasms) and abnormal postures. There are many different types of focal dystonia, each affecting a different region of the body. For example, in focal hand dystonia, or writer's cramp, the fingers either curl into the palm or extend outward without control. In musicians, the condition is called musician's focal dystonia, or simply, musician's dystonia. In sports, it may be involved in what is commonly referred to as the yips. The condition appears to be associated with over-training, and individualized treatment strategies may involve medications, retraining techniques, and procedures.

== Signs and symptoms ==
People with dystonia experience tightness, cramping, fatigue, involuntary sustained or repetitive muscle contractions that can be painless or painful and resulting in abnormal posturing, twisting motions, and even tremors. Focal dystonia typically presents in adults, more commonly in women ranging from ages 30 through 40. Major types of focal dystonia affect the limbs, face, mouth, neck, and larynx. These focal dystonias can be exclusive to specific tasks, like writing or playing an instrument. Focal dystonia will typically have a subtle and slow onset before slowly worsening over years. During the beginning stages, symptoms can be intermittent and without clear associations and provocation. The progression of this disease can vary from person to person. During the first couple years of onset, symptoms can partially or completely disappear for days to months, but return in other parts of the body.

== Causes ==
Current medical science does not precisely describe the causes of dystonia, but genetic and environmental factors may play a large role. Misfiring of neurons in the sensorimotor cortex, a thin layer of neural tissue that covers the brain, is thought to cause contractions. This misfiring may result from impaired inhibitory mechanisms during muscle contraction. When the brain tells a given muscle to contract, it simultaneously silences muscles that would oppose the intended movement. It appears that dystonia interferes with the brain's ability to inhibit those surrounding muscles, leading to loss of selectivity.

The sensorimotor cortex is organized as discrete "maps" of the human body. Under normal conditions, each body part (such as individual fingers) occupies a distinct area on these cortical maps. In dystonia, these maps lose their distinct borders and overlap occurs. Exploration of this initially involved over-training particular finger movements in non-human primates, which resulted in the development of focal hand dystonia. Examination of the primary somatosensory cortex in the trained animals showed grossly distorted representations of the maps pertaining to the fingers when compared to the untrained animals. Additionally, these maps in the dystonic animals had lost the distinct borders that were noted in the untrained animals.

Imaging studies in humans with focal dystonia have confirmed this finding. Also, synchronous afferent stimulation of peripheral muscles induces organizational changes in motor representations, characterized both by an increase in map size of stimulated muscles and a reduction in map separation, as assessed using transcranial magnetic stimulation.

The cross-connectivity between areas that are normally segregated in the sensory cortex may prevent normal sensorimotor feedback and so contribute to the observed co-contraction of antagonist muscle groups, and inappropriately timed and sequenced movements that underlie the symptoms of focal dystonia. It is hypothesized that a deficit in inhibition caused by a genetically mediated loss of inhibitory interneurons may be the underlying cause of the deficits observed in dystonia.

While usually painless, in some instances the sustained contraction and abnormal posturing in dystonia cause pain. Focal dystonia most typically affects people who rely on fine motor skills—musicians, writers, surgeons, etc. It is thought that the excessive motor training those skills require may contribute to the development of dystonia as their cortical maps become enlarged and begin to overlap. Focal dystonia is generally "task-specific," meaning that it is only problematic during certain activities.

== Diagnosis ==
The diagnosis of focal dystonia is highly dependent on the history of the patient and ruling out other causes of movement disorder, as physical exam is typically normal. The main types of are blepharospasm, oromandibular dystonia, spasmodic dysphonia, spasmodic torticollis, and limb dystonia, all affecting a different region of the body. Labs and imaging may be ordered as workup to evaluate for other causes of dystonia. A provider can rule in or out dopamine-responsive dystonia with a levodopa trial.

== Treatment ==
Treatment options would be based on the type of focal dystonia the patient has. If possible, incorporating rest earlier to symptom onset has shown to have greater improvement in symptoms for writer's cramp.

=== Physical therapy ===
Physical therapy is commonly used as an adjunct or main form of treatment for focal dystonia, however more studies for its benefit are needed. Bass guitarist and instructor Scott Devine said that he wears a glove while playing bass guitar because of the condition. He finds that the glove stops the involuntary finger movements. He says it works for him but does not suggest that it may work for everyone with the condition.

=== Medications ===
Anticholinergics such as Artane can be prescribed for off-label use, as some patients have had success. Benzodiazepines, such as Clonazepam, can be used as a muscle relaxant. Other oral medications have been studied for different types of focal dystonia, such as baclofen, tetrabenazine, amantadine, antipsychotics, and amphetamine.

=== Procedures ===
This condition is often treated with injections of botulinum neurotoxin type A (BoNT/A). BoNT/A reduces the symptoms of the disorder but it is not a cure for dystonia. Since the root of the problem is neurological, doctors have explored sensorimotor retraining activities to enable the brain to "rewire" itself and eliminate dystonic movements. For some dystonias, Deep brain stimulation may be considered where BoNT treatment fails. If the dystonia is caused by an underlying nerve entrapment, surgical decompression has shown to have improvement in some cases.

== Prognosis ==
Recovery from focal dystonia has varying results, ranging from minimal improvement in function to complete recovery and ranging from weeks to years.

== Prevention ==
Though studies on prevention of focal dystonia is limited, it is believed for musician's dystonia that mindfulness of muscle use and proper rest can help prevent focal dystonia and injury.

== Performing arts medicine ==
=== Musician's dystonia ===
Musician's dystonia treatment studies have yielded varying results. This condition can often be misdiagnosed as psychogenic, as this was previously thought to be its cause. In this population, men are affected more than women from 20 to 60 years of age. Evaluation of musician's dystonia should include history before and after symptom onset and observation of playing the instrument, as deficits can be subtle and considered minor to the general population. Treatment modalities available, such as BoNT/A, leave many musicians unsatisfied due to muscle weakness and lack of improvement in muscle control. In musicians, this is commonly associated with overuse or high volume of practicing. Though musician's dystonia presents initially as task-specific, one study found that the dystonia can progress outside of playing their instrument.

Treatments such as splinting and sensorimotor retraining for focal hand dystonia have shown to be beneficial with varying results. It is important to consider the mental health and social aspect of this condition as a musician's self-identity and career can be affected considerably. The approach to treating musician's dystonia requires an understanding and collaboration with the musician to obtain a complete history and tailor treatment and education effectively. The most successful treatment for musician's dystonia has been a multidisciplinary approach, involving physicians, physical therapists, physiotherapists, psychologists, and music instructors, focusing on rehabilitation that can involve retraining the brain to play their instrument again and even learning to play other instruments.

== Noted patients ==
- Daniel Adair, drummer for Nickelback
- Scott Adams, the writer of the Dilbert comics, had focal dystonia of the right hand, which impeded his artwork.
- Tom Adams, bluegrass banjo player, has focal dystonia in his right hand, and has switched to the guitar.
- Badi Assad, Brazilian singer-guitarist, was diagnosed with focal dystonia in 1999; she eventually recovered and resumed her career.
- Andy Billups, bass guitarist with British rock group, The Hamsters, has made a partial recovery; he plays by using modified guitar plectrums.
- Liona Boyd, Canadian classical guitarist, publicized as the "First Lady of the Guitar", retired from the concert stage for six years in 2003, due to focal dystonia that affected her right hand. She worked to retrain her right hand, and since 2009 has been performing again as a guitarist, singer, and songwriter.
- Berkley Breathed, American Pulitzer Prize winning comic strip artist and book writer/illustrator. Known for Bloom County, Opus, and others. His work was featured as that of the main character, as an adult, of the film Second Hand Lions.
- Stuart Cassells, founder of the bagpipe rock group Red Hot Chilli Pipers, announced focal dystonia in September 2011; he has left the band.
- Andrew Dawes, noted violinist and co-founder of the Orford String Quartet
- Scott Devine, bassist and founder of ScottsBassLessons SBL
- Keith Emerson, pianist and keyboard player
- Leon Fleisher, an international concert pianist, dealt with this condition in his right hand beginning in the 1960s and switched to only left hand playing. In the 2000s, he regained use of his right hand and recommenced performing and recording with two hands.
- Dominic Frasca, guitarist
- Reinhard Goebel, Baroque violinist, switched to playing left-handed.
- Kara Goucher, long distance runner, diagnosed with runner's dystonia in 2021. She had ended her competitive career a few years prior to the diagnosis.
- Gary Graffman, pianist, who changed to performing only with his left hand.
- Rustem Hayroudinoff, concert pianist
- Jang Jae-in, Korean singer-songwriter and guitarist diagnosed with dystonia in her left hand in 2012. In 2015, on You Hee-yeol's Sketchbook, she announced that she quit playing guitar.
- Alex Klein, principal oboist of the Chicago Symphony Orchestra
- Alfred Koffler, guitarist of rock band Pink Cream 69, diagnosed in early 2000s. To help him with live shows, Uwe Reitenauer was hired as a second guitarist. Koffler continues to write and perform live on stage with the band.
- Julian Lage, jazz guitarist
- David Leisner, classical guitarist, has recovered the full use of his hand after a decade of disability.
- Billy McLaughlin, guitarist, switched to playing left-handed when affected by dystonia.
- Christian Münzner, lead guitarist of progressive extreme metal band Obscura
- Apostolos Paraskevas, Greek-American classical guitarist-composer, was struck by focal dystonia to his right hand in 2009. He fully recovered in 2013.
- Charlie Parr, American country blues musician from Minnesota
- Satoyasu Shomura, Japanese drummer for rock band Alexandros, suspended live activities in 2019, before full retirement in 2020.
- Philip Smith, principal trumpet, New York Philharmonic, 1978–2014
- Alex Webster, bassist
- Victor Wooten, bassist, has it on both hands
- Satoshi Yamaguchi, drummer for the Japanese rock band RADWIMPS, developed focal dystonia in his right leg, which affected his bass drum pedaling. After stepping away from performing in 2015, he became a neuroscientific researcher studying the condition and co-developed a voice-activated drum system to return to performing.
