= Pen paralysis =

The term pen paralysis was historically used to refer to two distinct conditions:

- Writer's block
- Writer's cramp
