= Thespis (disambiguation) =

Thespis was a 6th-century BC Greek poet.

Thespis may also refer to:

- Thespis (opera), an opera by W. S. Gilbert and Arthur Sullivan
- Thespis (plant), a genus of flowering plants in the daisy family
- Thespis (mantis), a genus of mantis in the family Thespidae
