= Apostolos Paraskevas =

Greek composer and guitarist

Apostolos Paraskevas is a Grammy nominated composer and guitarist. He was born in Volos, Greece. Parents of Apostolos were Panayiotis Paraskevas (1925-1990) and Chrysoula Paraskevas (1929-2002).

== Career ==
Apostolos Paraskevas is a published recording artist and recently an award-winning Film Director/Producer. Gold Level Award at the 2010 California Film Awards, Silver Screen Award in the 2010 Nevada Film Festival.

Classical Guitar Magazine/London acknowledged him as the only guitarist ever to have a major orchestral piece performed at New York's Carnegie Hall and the international press as the only musician who performed at Carnegie Hall in a Grim Reaper's outfit (Classical Guitar Magazine 2001, January)

He has received five First Prizes in International Composition Competitions. "Lukas Foss" Composition Competition 2000/USA, "Pappaioanou Composition" 1997/Greece, as well as performing with Lukas Foss at Carnegie Hall, Paraskevas has performed at Weill Hall/New York, Wertheim Performing Arts Center/Miami, Jordan Hall/Boston, Capella Hall/Russia, and the Athens Concert Hall/Greece etc. His eclectic compositional style arises as an idiosyncratic integration of seemingly conflicting influences – from avant-garde approaches to harmonic structure, form, and timbre, to pop-folk modal and rhythmical concepts – amalgamated into a personal evocative musical language, characterized by rhythmic verve, melodic grace, dramatic (and sometimes unexpectedly humorous) gestures, and ritualistic or theatrical elements-Groves Dictionary of Music

Paraskevas' profile is included in the State of the Axe publication by photographer Ralph Gibson as one of 80 most innovative living guitarists.

He is a professor of music at Berklee College of Music and a composer in residence at Northeastern University in Boston. Paraskevas was the founder and the artistic director (1990–2007) of the International Guitar Congress/Corfu.

Paraskevas' compositions and performances are published by Centaur and Bridge Records/USA, Berben/Italy, Schott/Germany, Silver Sickle Productions and PaNas(Greece). His works include seven guitar concertos, one concerto for flute and violin, several orchestral works, vocal music, string quartets, film music, solo music, and hundreds of works for the classical guitar.

Apostolos Paraskevas was struck by Focal Dystonia to his right hand in 2009. He fully recovered in 2013 after 7,000 hours of work in re-constructing his technique. He decoded the condition as an unconscious behavioral habit and returned to performing professionally again. His article A Classical Guitarist's Story of Recovery from Focal Dystonia was published in London in the Classical Guitar Magazine His latest recording 'Phoenix' 2018 was received as 'the triumphant return to recording' by the Classical Guitar Magazine
