= Henry Meige =

French neurologist (1866–1940)

Henri Meige (11 February 1866 – 29 September 1940) was a French neurologist born in Moulins-sur-Allier. He characterized Meige's syndrome in 1910.

He studied medicine in Paris under Jean Charcot (1825–1893), earning his doctorate in 1893. Afterwards he worked at the Salpêtrière and the École des Beaux-Arts, where in the 1920s he was appointed professor.

With Édouard Brissaud (1852–1909) he researched skeletal changes in acromegaly, concluding that gigantism in adolescents is fundamentally the same disease as acromegaly in adults. During World War I he conducted studies of neuropathy with Pierre Marie (1853–1940).

Meige is best known for his work with extrapyramidal lesions. In 1902, with Eugene Feindel, he published an important work on motor disturbances, blepharospasms and tics. In contrast to Charcot, Meige asserted that disturbances of the extrapyramidal system were manifestations of pathological changes outside the pyramidal system.

He was editor of the journals Nouvelle iconographie de la Salpêtrière and Schriftleiter of the Revue Neurologique.

== Publications ==
- Etude sur certains névropathes Voyageurs. Paris, 1893.
- Leçons cliniques sur les maladies mentales et nerveuses : (Salpétriére, 1887-1894), 1895; (by Jules Séglas, collected and published by Henry Meige).
- Les tics Traitement et leur. Paris, 1902; (with Eugene Feindel)
- Tics. Paris, 1905.
