= Torsin-1A =

Protein-coding gene in the species Homo sapiens

TOR1A

Identifiers
- Aliases: TOR1A, DQ2, DYT1, Torsin A, torsin family 1 member A, AMC5
- External IDs: OMIM: 605204; MGI: 1353568; GeneCards: TOR1A

Gene location (Human)
Chr.	Chromosome 9 (human)
Band	9q34.11	Start	129,812,942 bp
Band	9q34.11	End	129,824,244 bp

Gene location (Mouse)
Chr.	Chromosome 2 (mouse)
Band	2|2 B	Start	30,850,639 bp
Band	2|2 B	End	30,857,945 bp
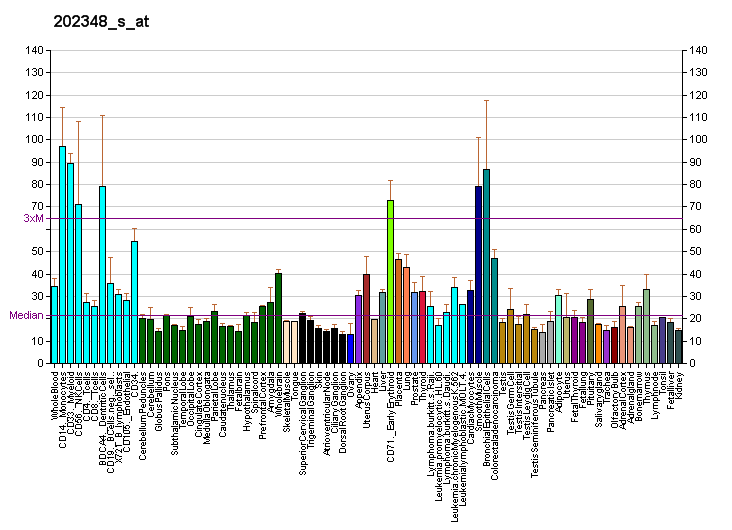

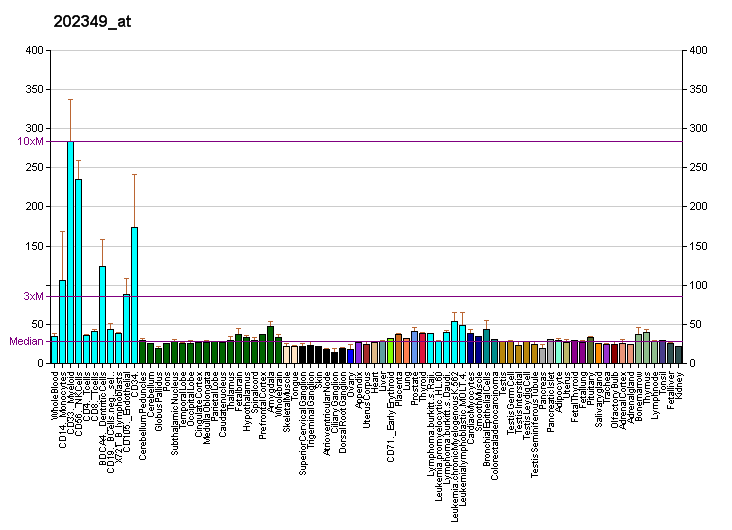
RNA expression pattern
Bgee	Human / Mouse (ortholog); Top expressed in: stromal cell of endometrium; secondary oocyte; monocyte; endothelial cell; granulocyte; smooth muscle tissue; blood; right adrenal cortex; left adrenal gland; gallbladder / Top expressed in: primary oocyte; secondary oocyte; zygote; granulocyte; renal corpuscle; otic vesicle; yolk sac; medullary collecting duct; proximal tubule; neural tube; More reference expression data
BioGPS	More reference expression data
Gene ontology
Molecular function	nucleotide binding; unfolded protein binding; misfolded protein binding; cytoskeletal protein binding; ATPase activity; protein binding; kinesin binding; hydrolase activity; ATP binding
Cellular component	cytoplasm; cell projection; endoplasmic reticulum lumen; nuclear envelope; membrane; synaptic vesicle; growth cone; synapse; secretory granule; transport vesicle; cell junction; extrinsic component of endoplasmic reticulum membrane; endoplasmic reticulum; neuron projection; cytoskeleton; cytoplasmic vesicle membrane; extracellular exosome; cytoplasmic vesicle; nucleus; cytosol; nuclear membrane; intracellular membrane-bounded organelle
Biological process	regulation of dopamine uptake involved in synaptic transmission; regulation of protein localization to cell surface; nuclear envelope organization; ER-associated misfolded protein catabolic process; response to oxidative stress; organelle organization; chaperone cofactor-dependent protein refolding; cell adhesion; nuclear membrane organization; positive regulation of synaptic vesicle endocytosis; intermediate filament cytoskeleton organization; protein localization to nucleus; synaptic vesicle transport; protein deneddylation; neuron projection development; protein homooligomerization; wound healing, spreading of cells; chaperone-mediated protein folding
Sources:Amigo / QuickGO
Orthologs
Databases	NCBI: entry; OMA: entry
Species	Human	Mouse
Entrez	1861	30931
Ensembl	ENSG00000136827	ENSMUSG00000026849
UniProt	O14656	Q9ER39
RefSeq (mRNA)	NM_000113	NM_144884
RefSeq (protein)	NP_000104	NP_659133
Location (UCSC)	Chr 9: 129.81 – 129.82 Mb	Chr 2: 30.85 – 30.86 Mb
PubMed search
- Wikidata
View/Edit Human	View/Edit Mouse

Torsin-1A (TorA) also known as dystonia 1 protein (DYT1) is a protein that in humans is encoded by the TOR1A gene (also known as DQ2 or DYT1). TorA localizes to the endoplasmic reticulum and contiguous perinuclear space, where its ATPase activity is activated by either LULL1 or LAP1, respectively.

== Function ==
The protein encoded by this gene is a member of the AAA family of adenosine triphosphatases (ATPases), is related to the Clp protease/heat shock family.

== Clinical significance ==
Mutations in this gene result in the autosomal dominant disorder, torsion dystonia 1.
