= Karlman Wasserman =

American physician, physiologist and professor (1927–2020)

Karlman Wasserman (12 March 1927 — 22 June 2020) was an American physiologist and professor. Wasserman worked extensively on pulmonary physiology, using exercise testing for the interaction of cardiovascular, ventilatory and metabolic responses. He is the founder of the Wasserman 9-Panel Plot.

== Biography ==
Wasserman was born in Brooklyn, New York. At the age of 17 he enrolled at Princeton University to study Engineering. His studies at Princeton University were cut short by service in the United States Army during the occupation of Japan from 1945-1946. Upon returning to the United States, Wasserman abandoned his study in engineering, graduating from Upsala College in 1947 with a degree in chemistry and a minor in biology. He then attended the Tulane University where he earned his PhD in Physiology in 1951. Wasserman was a professor at Tulane University Department of Physiology when he was admitted to the Tulane University School of Medicine in 1954. He continued to be on the faculty at Tulane University while completing his Medical Degree. He continued his medical training with an internship on the Osler Service at Johns Hopkins Hospital in Baltimore. He then had a fellowship at University of California, San Francisco. He was a member of the faculty at Stanford University from 1961 to 1967. In 1967, he accepted the position of Professor at the UCLA School of Medicine and Chief of the Division or Respiratory and Critical Care Physiology at Harbor-UCLA School of Medicine in Torrance, CA. At the time of his death he was Professor Emeritus at the UCLA School of Medicine.

Wasserman worked extensively on pulmonary physiology. He was one of the first persons who used exercise testing for the interaction of cardiovascular, ventilatory and metabolic responses. He is the founder of the Wasserman 9-Panel Plot, named after himself. This Nine-Panel Plot is a standard layout for the graphical representation of data produced by a cardiopulmonary exercise test. He also described the "gear wheel model" used for explaining results obtained from the exercise test in humans. He described how to determine the “anaerobic threshold” by using ventilatory and cardiovascular gas exchange responses during exercise testing. Dr. Wasserman defined the “anaerobic threshold” in 1964 as the exercise intensity beyond which the molecule, lactic acid, accumulates in the blood. He recognized the significance of this finding, as lactic acid accumulation may reflect health risk due to a deficit in oxygen supply. He showed that the anaerobic threshold can be used to determine a health risk due to inadequate oxygen availability. He defined the theory and practice of detecting the anaerobic threshold by analyzing changes in the composition of the expired air. The anaerobic threshold is now used in diagnosis of diseases and in the training of athletes internationally.

Dr. Wasserman was a mentor to numerous physicians and scientists in training. The Wasserman Visiting Professorship at Harbor-UCLA Medical Center was established in 1999 and is awarded annually to a leader in pulmonary medicine. This is an event when trainees, some from decades ago, reunite to visit and learn the latest in advancements in pulmonary medicine.

He was chief of the division of “Respiratory and Critical Care Physiology and Medicine” at the UCLA Harbor Hospital Medical Center in Torrance, CA between 1967 and 1997. After 1997 he continued doing research and teaching at this location. He was Professor Emeritus on Recall at the UCLA School of Medicine. He has written nearly 400 peer-reviewed articles, 5 books, several book chapters and scientific reviews in his career that spanned 70 years. Amongst the most noteworthy was his 1967 landmark paper entitled, Interaction of Physiological Mechanisms during Exercise. He is father of the physiologist Dr. David H. Wasserman of Vanderbilt University School of Medicine.

He died in Palos Verdes Estates, California on 22 June 2020, aged 93.
