= Alois Lutz =

Austrian figure skater

- Born: June 18, 1898; Hernals, Austria
- Died: February 15, 1918; Hernals, Austria

Figure skating career
- Country: Austria

Alois Lutz (1898–1918) was an Austrian figure skater credited with inventing the Lutz jump.

Lutz was born into a poor family in Hernals and worked as a mechanic's assistant after he finished school. This was an unusual background for figure skaters at the time, as it was an expensive sport. He was able to afford to skate due to his talent being discovered by Eduard Engelmann Jr., who financially supported his training.

Beginning in 1912, Lutz began to compete in club competitions. In 1913, he came third behind Ludwig Wrede and Georg Pamperl at a competition at Engelmann's rink. Reports from this competition in Neues Wiener Tagblatt and the sports newspaper Illustriertes Sportblatt praised his speed, originality, and difficult jumps, comparing him in style to Ivan Malinin. His only participation in international competition came at a small competition in 1914, where he placed fifth out of seven skaters. At this time, he also participated in bandy and speed skating, and he entered an ice waltz competition, although he did not compete.

His last competition came in 1917. Aged 19, he was drafted for military service, from which he returned with tuberculosis, and he died early the next year. He was buried in a shared grave in Hernals Cemetery.

Although the Lutz jump has been credited to Lutz, its exact origin is unclear, and various years for its first appearance have been given in different publications. He may have first performed it in 1913 at the competition at Engelmann's rink, based on the reports of his original and difficult jumps there, but no known primary sources specifically describe his Lutz jump. The earliest written reference to another skater performing a Lutz jump was not until 1928 with regards to Otto Preißecker, although other skaters had likely begun to jump it earlier; T. D. Richardson later mentioned having seen a Lutz performed by Paul Kreckow in the early 1920s.
