= Wasserman 9-Panel Plot =

Layout for representing data from a cardiopulmonary test

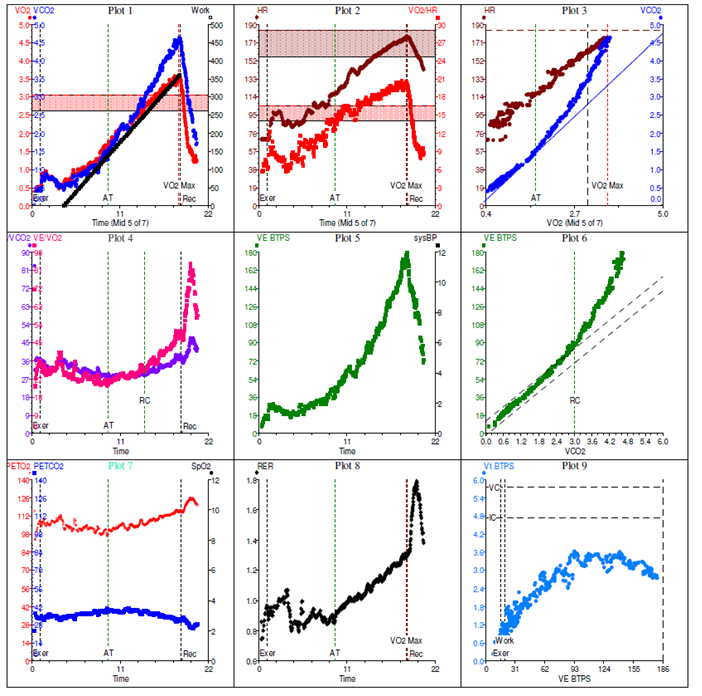
Wasserman 9 Panel-Plot for 36-year-old man.

The Wasserman 9-Panel Plot, often called a Nine-Panel Plot, is a standard layout for the graphical representation of data produced by a cardiopulmonary exercise test. The layout was updated in 2012. The graphs give an overview of cardiovascular, ventilatory, and gas exchange parameters.

== Eponym ==
The Wasserman 9-Panel Plot is named for American physiologist Professor Karlman Wasserman M.D. Ph.D., who first displayed the data in this manner. Professor Wasserman worked extensively on pulmonary physiology, and also described the "gear wheel model" used for explaining results obtained from the test.
