= Meige's syndrome =

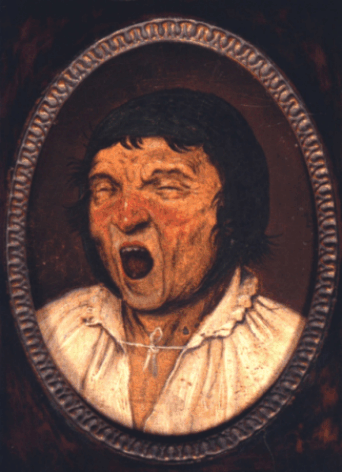
- This 16th-century painting by Flemish artist Pieter Bruegel the Elder is one of the oldest known depictions of the facial dystonia associated with this syndrome.
- Specialty: Neurology

Meige's syndrome is a type of dystonia. It is also known as Brueghel's syndrome and oral facial dystonia. It is actually a combination of two forms of dystonia, blepharospasm and oromandibular dystonia (OMD).

When OMD is combined with blepharospasm, it may be referred to as Meige's Syndrome named after Henri Meige, the French neurologist who first described the symptoms in detail in 1910. The symptoms usually begin between the ages of 30 and 70 years old and appear to be more common in women than in men (2:1 ratio). The combination of upper and lower dystonia is sometimes called cranial-cervical dystonia. The incidence is about one case in 20,000 people.

== Presentation ==
The main symptoms involve involuntary blinking and chin thrusting. Some patients may experience excessive tongue protrusion, squinting, light sensitivity, muddled speech, or uncontrollable contraction of the platysma muscle. Some Meige's patients also have "laryngeal dystonia" (spasms of the larynx). Blepharospasm may lead to embarrassment in social situations, and oromandibular dystonia can affect speech, making it difficult to carry on the simplest conversations. This can cause difficulty in both personal and professional contexts, and in some cases may cause patients to withdraw from social situations.

The condition tends to affect women more frequently than men.

=== Symptoms ===
Oromandibular Symptoms

- difficulty opening the mouth (trismus)
- clenching or grinding of the teeth (bruxism)
- spasms of jaw opening
- sideways deviation or protrusion of the jaw
- lip tightening and pursing
- drawing back (retraction) of the corners of the mouth
- deviation or protrusion of the tongue.
- jaw pain
- difficulties eating and drinking
- difficulties speaking (dysarthria)

Blepharospasm symptoms

- the first symptom to appear is an increased rate of blinking
- uncontrollable squinting/closing of eyes
- light sensitivity (photophobia)
- squinting/eyes closing during speech
- uncontrollable eyes closing shut (rare instances completely causing blindness)

In addition, in some patients, the dystonic spasms may sometimes be provoked by certain activities, such as talking, chewing, or biting. Particular activities or sensory tricks may sometimes temporarily alleviate OMD symptoms, including chewing gum, talking, placing a toothpick in the mouth, lightly touching the lips or chin, or applying pressure beneath the chin.

== Diagnosis ==
Meige's is commonly misdiagnosed and most doctors will not be familiar with this condition due to its rare incidence. Usually, a neurologist specializing in psychomotor disorders can detect Meige's. There are currently no technological diagnostic tools to detect Meige's, as it cannot be identified using blood chemistry analysis or radiological imaging, such as MRI or CT scans. A patient presenting with signs of OMD alone may be misdiagnosed with TMJD temporomandibular joint dysfunction.

Patients with idiopathic Meige's syndrome do not quickly respond to anticholinergic drug treatments, a diagnostic sign that can help differentiate it from acute dystonia, which does respond to anticholinergic drugs.

=== Upper and lower dystonia types ===
The Greek word blepharon means "eyelid". Spasm means "uncontrolled muscle contraction". The term blepharospasm ['blef-a-ro-spaz-m] can be applied to any abnormal blinking or eyelid tic or twitch resulting from any cause, ranging from dry eyes to Tourette's syndrome to tardive dyskinesia. The blepharospasm referred to here is officially called benign essential blepharospasm (BEB) to distinguish it from the less serious secondary blinking disorders. "Benign" indicates the condition is not life-threatening, and "essential" is a medical term meaning "of unknown cause". It is both a cranial and a focal dystonia. Cranial refers to the head and focal indicates confinement to one part. The word dystonia describes abnormal involuntary sustained muscle contractions and spasms. Patients with blepharospasm have normal eyes. The visual disturbance is due solely to the forced closure of the eyelids.

Oromandibular dystonia (OMD) is a form of focal dystonia that affects varying areas of the head and neck including the lower face, jaw, tongue and larynx. The spasms may cause the mouth to pull open, shut tight, or move repetitively. Speech and swallowing may be distorted. It is often associated with dystonia of the cervical muscles (Spasmodic Torticollis), eyelids (Blepharospasm), or larynx (Spasmodic Dysphonia).

In patients with OMD, involuntary contractions may involve the muscles used for chewing (masticatory muscles). These may include the thick muscle in the cheek that closes the jaw (masseter muscle) and the broad muscle that draws back the lower jaw and closes the mouth (temporalis muscle). Some patients may also experience involuntary contractions of the wide muscle at the side of the neck (platysmal muscle). This muscle draws down the corner of the mouth and lower lip or other muscle groups.

== Treatment ==
In some cases Meige's syndrome can be reversed when it is caused by medication. Botulinum toxin injections can be helpful for the blepharospasm and for masseter spasm.

== See also ==
- Mogigraphia
