= Vendôme Redoubt =

Vendôme Redoubt may refer to a number of redoubts in Malta:

- Baħar iċ-Ċagħaq Redoubt in Naxxar
- Dellia Battery in St. Paul's Bay
- Ramla Redoubt in Xagħra
- Vendôme Tower in Marsaxlokk
