= Mbekite =

Faction of the African National Congress that adheres to Thabo Mbeki's policies

Mbekite is a colloquial term for a faction of the African National Congress that adheres to the socio-political and economic policies of former South African president Thabo Mbeki. It is mostly a combination of social democracy and capitalist overtures, while laying a heavy emphasis upon the development of native "African solutions to African problems" (i.e., the rejection of European sanctions or an invasion force in favor of diplomatic negotiations on the issue of Zimbabwe), which was made known in Mbeki's foreign policy during his presidency.

The Mbekite faction in the ANC was almost entirely dumped from public office by the newly elected National Executive Committee in 2007–2008.

== See also ==
- Brownite
- Blairite
- 2008 proposed split from the African National Congress
