= Arthur P. Warner =

Arthur Pratt Warner
- Born: April 18, 1870; Jacksonville, Florida
- Died: March 22, 1957 (aged 86); Beloit, Wisconsin
- Occupations: Inventor, businessman, aviator
- Known for: Invented the first automobile speedometer; first to fly in Wisconsin

Warner Auto-Meter
- Warner Auto-Meter car during the 1908 Glidden Tour via the Detroit Public Library
- Man painting Warner Auto-Meter billboard on truck during 1909 New York automobile carnival parade via the Detroit Public Library
- Advertising card for the Warner Auto-Meter, a combined odometer, speedometer, and clock via the National Museum of American History

Arthur Pratt Warner (April 18, 1870, Jacksonville, Florida – March 22, 1957, Beloit, Wisconsin) was an American inventor, businessman and pioneer aviator. His inventions include the electric brake and, along with his brother, the automotive speedometer.

He was the first American private citizen to purchase an airplane, the "first commercially built airplane". He paid Glenn Curtiss $6000 (equal to $209,978 today) a disassembled one. Once he had assembled it (without instructions or manuals), he became the first person to fly in Wisconsin, at Beloit on November 4, 1909. He got 50 feet (15 m) off the ground and traveled a quarter mile (0.4 km). This also made him the eleventh American pilot.

A self-taught engineer, with his brother Charles he invented the first automobile speedometer, which made him rich. The Warner Instrument Co. was incorporated in 1903, with Warner as vice president and general manager. In 1912, he sold his speedometer company for $1.2 million, equal to $39,099,310 today. In 1917, the Warner Manufacturing Co. came into existence, with Warner as president, to make automobile and truck trailers. Inventions that he developed in connection with this business included the electric brake and power clutch. He retired in 1934.

== See also ==
- Odometer § Subsequent developments – for Warner's Auto-Meter
