= Lutz jump =

Figure skating jump

Figure skating element
- Element name: Lutz jump
- Scoring abbreviation: Lz
- Element type: Jump
- Take-off edge: Back outside
- Landing edge: Back outside
- Inventor: Alois Lutz

The Lutz is a figure skating jump named after Alois Lutz, an Austrian skater. It is a toe-pick assisted jump with an entrance from a back outside edge and landing on the back outside edge of the opposite foot. It is the second-most difficult jump in figure skating and "probably the second-most famous jump after the Axel".

== History ==
The Lutz jump is named after figure skater Alois Lutz from Vienna, Austria, who may have first performed it in 1913, though historian Matthias Hampe did not find contemporary sources that referenced the jump before the 1920s, after Lutz's death. Maribel Vinson wrote that it was rare in North America before 1930.

In competitions, points are awarded based on the number of rotations completed during the jump. The base value of a successful single Lutz is 0.6 points, a double Lutz is 2.1 points, a triple Lutz is 5.9 points, a quadruple Lutz is 11.5 points, and a quintuple Lutz is 14 points.

=== Firsts ===
Abbr.	Jump Element	Skater	Nation	Event	References
2Lz	Double Lutz (women's)	Jacqueline du Bief	France	1952 World Championships	
3Lz	Triple Lutz (men's)	Donald Jackson	Canada	1962 World Championships	
3Lz	Triple Lutz (women's)	Denise Biellmann	Switzerland	1978 European Championships	
4Lz	Quadruple Lutz (men's)	Brandon Mroz	United States	2011 Colorado Springs Invitational; 2011 NHK Trophy	
4Lz	Quadruple Lutz (women's)	Alexandra Trusova	Russia	2018 ISU Junior Grand Prix Armenia Cup	
3Lz	Side-by-side triple Lutz (pairs)	Meagan Duhamel and Ryan Arnold	Canada	2005 Canadian Championships	

== Execution ==
The International Skating Union (ISU) defines the Lutz jump as "a toe-pick assisted jump with an entrance from a back outside edge and landing on the back outside edge of the opposite foot". Skaters tend to go into it with a long, diagonal take-off into one of the corners of the rink. It is a difficult jump because it is counter-rotational: the skater sets it up by twisting in one way and jumping in the other. Many skaters "cheat" the jump because they are not strong enough to maintain the counter-rotational edge, resulting in taking off from the wrong edge. A "cheated" Lutz jump without an outside edge is called a "flutz".

== Gallery ==
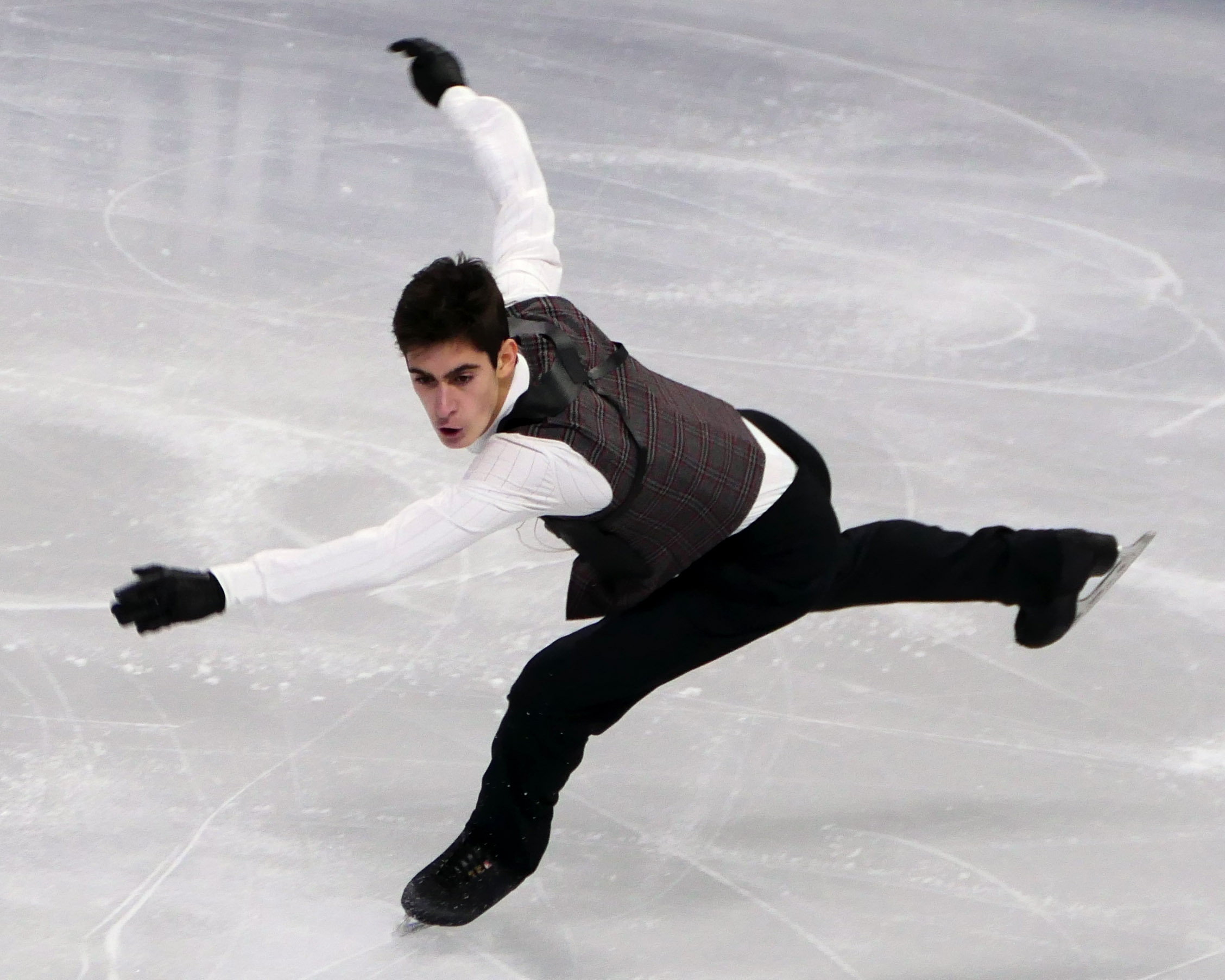
Semen Daniliants prepares a Lutz take-off

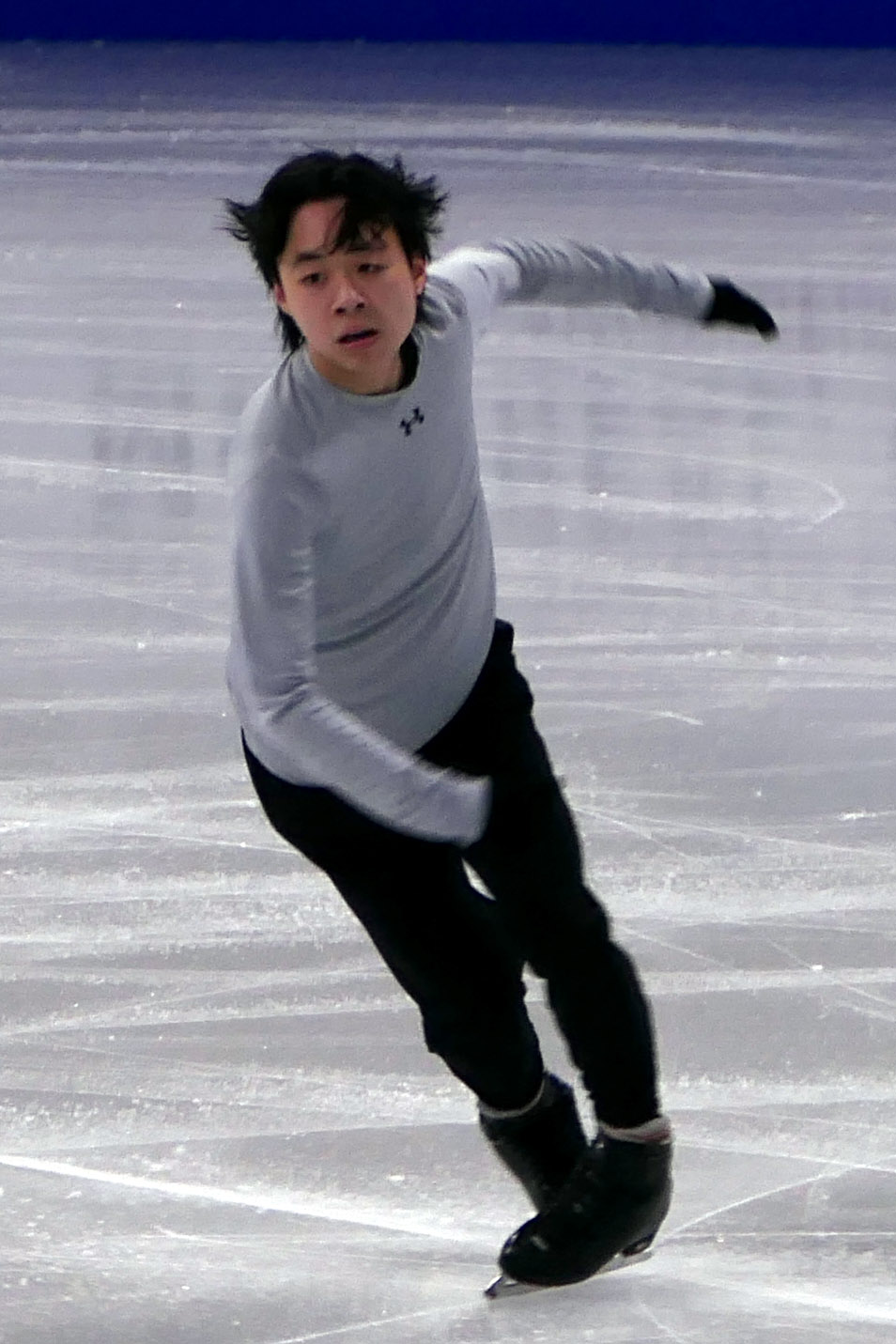
Wesley Chiu hits the ice with his right toe pick as his left blade remains on an outside edge

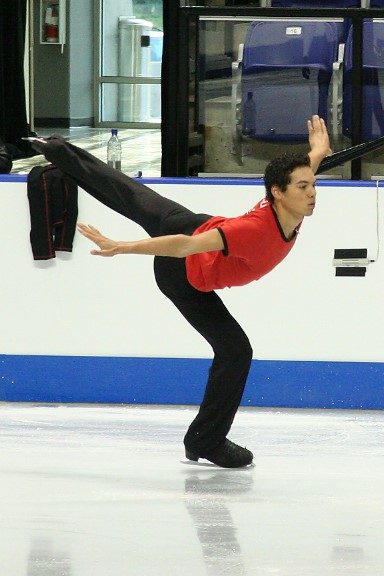
Jamal Othman landing

== Videos ==
Ekaterina Kurakova performing a triple Lutz jump (real-time and slow motion)

Kévin Aymoz performing a triple Lutz jump (real-time and slow motion)

Rinka Watanabe performing a triple Lutz jump (real-time and slow motion)

Adam Siao Him Fa performing a triple Lutz jump

== Works cited ==
- "ISU Figure Skating Media Guide 2025/26" (PDF). Lausanne, Switzerland: International Skating Union. 21 August 2025. Archived (PDF) from the original on 14 September 2025.
