= Rosa Parks Highway =

Rosa Parks Highway or Rosa Parks Freeway may refer to:

- A section of Interstate 55 in Missouri
- A section of Interstate 96 in Detroit, Michigan
- A section of Interstate 10 in Los Angeles, California
- A section of State Route 58 in Bakersfield, California
- Interstate 475 (Ohio)
