= Oromandibular dystonia =

- Other names: Orofaciomandibular dystonia, lingual dystonia, orofacial buccal dystonia, jaw dystonia, adult onset facial dystonia, and cranial dystonia.
- Specialty: Neurology

Oromandibular dystonia (OMD) is an uncommon focal neurological condition affecting the jaws, face, and mouth. Oromandibular dystonia is characterized by involuntary spasms of the tongue, jaw, and mouth muscles that result in bruxism, or grinding of the teeth, and jaw closure. These conditions frequently lead to secondary dental wear as well as temporomandibular joint syndrome. In addition, problems with chewing, speaking, and swallowing may result from jaw opening, involuntary tongue movements, or jaw deviation.

Meige's syndrome is the combination of upper facial dystonic movements, blepharospasm, and OMD.

While the use of oral appliances has been documented, effective management typically consists of a combination of physiotherapy, oral medications, and botulinum toxin injections.

== Signs and symptoms ==
Clinical manifestations vary depending on the muscles involved, the extent of OMD, and its distribution. Impaired mastication, dysphagia, dysphonia (alteration of speech), mandibular disorders (TMD) such as open locks, unconscious mandibular opening and closing, and pulling and twisting of the mandible forward or laterally are examples of dysfunctions.

Indications of dystonic spasms include platysma spasms, mouth corner retractions, tongue dyskinesia, bruxism, lip pursing or sucking, facial grimacing, and nasal contractions. Breathing issues or dysarthria are also infrequently reported.

The onset of symptoms is more common in women and typically occurs between the ages of 40 and 70. The symptoms only show up when speaking or masticating, for example. Typically, patients list stress, talking, chewing, praying, and chewing objects as triggers. Routine lab tests are typically normal. Most of the time, it is reported that poor oral function is linked to social embarrassment, a lower quality of life, depression, and weight loss.

== Causes ==
OMD can be acquired, inherited, or idiopathic. The clinical presentation of a more complicated degenerative movement disorder may include inherited OMD. Patients with inherited focal OMD have also been documented to have dystonia type 6, dystonia type 4, and dystonia type 16. Medication-induced OMD is the most prevalent type of acquired OMD. Although there have been several reports of OMD cases following dental work, it is still unknown whether these procedures are linked to the onset of dystonic symptoms. Similarly, it is unknown how much peripheral trauma contributes to OMD risk.

== Diagnosis ==
Because OMD can manifest in a variety of ways and to varying degrees, diagnosing it is a clinical and challenging process. Since there is no medical test that can diagnose it, the diagnosis is made based on the patient's medical history, physical examination, neurological examination, and intramuscular electromyography (EMG) confirmation.

Hemifacial spasm, psychological disorders, and TMJ disorders (such as bruxism or spontaneous condylar dislocation) are included in the differential diagnosis.

== Treatment ==
The effectiveness of the different medications currently used to treat dystonia is not well-documented. Nonetheless, lithium, levodopa, dopamine receptor antagonists, carbamazepine, anticonvulsants, antiparkinson drugs, benzodiazepines, baclofen, and anticholinergic are a few of the medications used to treat OMD.

It is believed that over time, physiotherapy will encourage brain rewiring, which will lessen dystonic movements. This response is widely recognized among musicians.

Injections of botulinum neurotoxins (BoNT), a potent neurotoxin that inhibits acetylcholine release at the presynaptic junction and causes transient chemical denervation of skeletal muscles, are a promising treatment for OMD.

== Epidemiology ==
OMD is thought to affect 68.9 cases per million people. OMD typically manifests itself during the sixth decade of life. Almost twice as many women as men are impacted.
