= Joaquin Farias =

Spanish-born Canadian writer (born 1973)

- Born: 1973 (age 52–53); Murcia, Spain
- Citizenship: Canada
- Occupation: Movement therapist
- Known for: Farias Technique

Joaquin Farias (born 1973) is a Spanish-born Canadian writer specializing in movement therapy for dystonia.

== Early life and education ==
Farias was born in 1973 in Murcia, Spain. He holds master's degrees in neuropsychological rehabilitation, psychosociology, and ergonomics and a doctorate in biomechanics.

== Career ==
At the age of 21, while training as a professional musician, Farias developed dystonia, which caused involuntary curling of his fingers and affected his ability to play the piano. Following his own experience with dystonia as a young musician, he began his research work on dystonia in 1996, which led him to create his own exercises to manage his condition.

After recovering, Farias created a training program based on principles of neuroplasticity. In 2018, he launched the Dystonia Recovery Online Program, which presents his movement-based exercises and approach for people with dystonia. Farias has worked as a coach for musicians, Olympic and Paralympic athletes, and dancers with focal dystonia and other practice-related movement disorders.

Previously, Farias served as an adjunct professor at the Music and Health Research Collaboratory of the University of Toronto.

== Research ==
Farias's work hypothesizes a link between dystonia and the insular cortex, which plays a role in controlling motion and emotion. Farias theorizes that repetitive activities might reinforce improper neural pathways, thereby exacerbating the condition.

His method, which he calls the Farias Technique, involves using movement-based exercises to help retrain brain functions related to motor and sensory processing. The core of his treatment approach is centered on relearning and normalizing repressed movements, through specific exercises. His approach has been described as using movement-based exercises to help re-balance what he characterises as an overtaxed nervous system in people with task-specific dystonia, and as interpreting their symptoms in terms of autonomic nervous system dysregulation. In a 2023 essay in Aeon, Farias was quoted as saying that dystonia involves non-motor symptoms and dysregulation of the autonomic nervous system, and that more research is needed in this area.

== Publications ==
=== Papers ===
- Farias, J.; Ordóñez, F. J.; Rosety-Rodriguez, M.; Carrasco, C.; Ribelles, A.; Rosety, M.; Rosety, J. M.; Gomez del Valle, M. (2002). "Anthropometrical analysis of the hand as a Repetitive Strain Injury (RSI) predictive method in pianists". Archivio Italiano di Anatomia ed Embriologia [Italian Journal of Anatomy and Embryology]. 107 (4): 225–231. ISSN 1122-6714. PMID 12611474.
- Rosety-Rodríguez, Manuel; Ordóñez Muñoz, Francisco Javier; Farias Martínez, Joaquín; Carrasco Molinillo, María del Carmen; Ribelles García, Antonio; Rosety Rodríguez, Jesús María; Gómez del Valle, Manuel (2003). "The influence of the active range of movement of pianists' wrists on repetitive strain injury". European Journal of Anatomy. 7 (2): 75–77. ISSN 1136-4890.
- Martín López, Tomás; Farías Martínez, Joaquín (June 2013). "Strategies to promote health and prevent musculoskeletal injuries in students from the high conservatory of music of Salamanca, Spain" (PDF). Medical Problems of Performing Artists. 28 (2): 100–106. doi:10.21091/mppa.2013.2018. ISSN 0885-1158. PMID 23752285.
- Ferrer, M.; Calatayúd, M. J.; Juste, J.; Farias, J.; Morello, P.; Iñigo, V. (January 2017). "Revisión del tratamiento rehabilitador en la distonía cervical: una puesta al día" [Review of rehabilitation treatment for cervical dystonia: An update]. Rehabilitación (in Spanish). 51 (1): 43–51. doi:10.1016/j.rh.2016.09.003.
