= Michelotti =

Michelotti is an Italian surname, derived from the given name Michele. Notable people with the surname include:

- Biordo Michelotti (1352–1398), Italian mercenary soldier leader
- Giovanni Michelotti (1921–1980), Italian automotive designer
- Giovanni Michelotti (naturalist) (1812–1898), Italian naturalist
- Maria Domenica Michelotti (born 1952), Captain Regent of San Marino
