= Writer's cramp =

Movement disorder of the hand or forearm

- Other names: Focal hand dystonia (FHD), Mogigraphia and Scrivener's palsy
- Specialty: Orthopedic surgery
- Usual onset: Mainly adult (30 to 50 years old)
- Causes: Overuse of writing; genetic
- Frequency: 7–69 per million population

Writer's cramp or focal hand dystonia (FHD), a form of focal dystonia, is an idiopathic movement disorder of adult onset, characterized by abnormal posturing and movement of the hand or forearm during tasks requiring skilled hand use, such as writing. Overcontraction of affected muscles, cocontraction of agonist and antagonist pairs, and activation of muscles inappropriate to a task all impair use of the affected hand.

Writer's cramp is a task-specific focal dystonia of the hand. "Focal" refers to the symptoms being limited to one location (the hand in this case), and "task-specific" means that symptoms first occur only when the individual engages in a particular activity. Writer's cramp first affects an individual by interfering with their ability to write, especially for prolonged periods of time.

Epidemiologic studies report a prevalence of 7–69 per million population, or 1 in 15,000–140,000 people, which explains its recognition as a rare disease, like all other forms of dystonia.

== Symptoms and signs ==
Onset usually occurs between the ages of 30 and 50 years and often starts with a feeling of tension in fingers and forearms that interferes with writing fluency.

More specifically, early symptoms may include loss of precision muscle coordination (sometimes first manifested in declining penmanship, frequent small injuries to the hands, dropped items and a noticeable increase in dropped or chipped dishes), cramping pain with sustained use and trembling. Significant muscle pain and cramping may result from very minor exertions like holding a book and turning pages. It may become difficult to find a comfortable position for arms and legs with even the minor exertions associated with holding arms crossed causing significant pain similar to restless leg syndrome. Affected persons may notice trembling in the diaphragm while breathing, or the need to place hands in pockets, under legs while sitting or under pillows while sleeping to keep them still and to reduce pain. Trembling in the jaw may be felt and heard while lying down, and the constant movement to avoid pain may result in the grinding and wearing down of teeth, or symptoms similar to TMD. The voice may crack frequently or become harsh, triggering frequent throat clearing. Swallowing can become difficult and accompanied by painful cramping. Patients may also present with varying degree of disability and symptoms, such as experiencing more difficulty writing down-stroke as compared to writing upstroke.

Electrical sensors (EMG) inserted into affected muscle groups, while painful, can provide a definitive diagnosis by showing pulsating nerve signals being transmitted to the muscles even when they are at rest. The brain appears to signal portions of fibers within the affected muscle groups at a firing speed of about 10 Hz causing them to pulsate, tremble and contort. When called upon to perform an intentional activity, the muscles fatigue very quickly and some portions of the muscle groups do not respond (causing weakness) while other portions over-respond or become rigid (causing micro-tears under load). The symptoms worsen significantly with use, especially in the case of focal dystonia, and a "mirror effect" is often observed in other body parts: use of the right hand may cause pain and cramping in that hand as well as in the other hand and legs that were not being used. Stress, anxiety, lack of sleep, sustained use and cold temperatures can worsen symptoms.

Direct symptoms may be accompanied by secondary effects of the continuous muscle and brain activity, including disturbed sleep patterns, exhaustion, mood swings, mental stress, difficulty concentrating, blurred vision, digestive problems and short temper. People with dystonia may also become depressed and find great difficulty adapting their activities and livelihood to a progressing disability. Side effects from treatment and medications can also present challenges in normal activities.

In some cases, symptoms may progress and then plateau for years, or stop progressing entirely. The progression may be delayed by treatment or adaptive lifestyle changes, while forced continued use may make symptoms progress more rapidly. In others, the symptoms may progress to total disability, making some of the more risky forms of treatment worth considering in the future.

== Causes ==
Although the cause of writer's cramp is not well known, it was historically believed to be the result of excessive fine motor activity, possibly complicated by a tense or otherwise inappropriate writing technique. More recently, Karin Rosenkranz et al. have suggested that this is not necessarily the case.

Recent studies point out that there appears to be a genetic component to focal hand dystonia (FHD). In fact, up to 20% of those with writer's cramp have a family member with some form of dystonia.

Musician's cramp (a similar focal dystonia which affects less than 1% of instrumentalists) has historically been grouped together with writer's cramp because of this and their common task-specificity. Rosenkranz et al. have more recently identified significant differences between the two populations, however. No matter exactly how it arises, researchers generally agree that these types of focal dystonia are the result of a basal ganglia or sensorimotor cortex malfunction in the brain.

== Treatment ==
Although dystonias may be induced by chemical exposure/ingestion, brain injury, or hereditary/genetic predisposition, the task-specific focal dystonias such as writer's cramp are a unique challenge to diagnose and treat. Some cases may respond to chemical injections - botulinum toxin (botox) is often cited, though it is not helpful in all cases. Behavioral retraining attempts may include writing devices, switching hands, occupational therapy, biofeedback, constraint-induced motion therapy, and others. Some writing instruments allow variations of pressure application for use. None of these are effective in all cases, however. The work of Dr. Joaquin Farias has shown that proprioceptive stimulation can induce neuroplasticity, making it possible for patients to recover substantial function that was lost from focal dystonia.

Anticholinergics such as Artane can be prescribed for off-label use, as some patients have had success.

== See also ==
- Carpal tunnel syndrome
- Dystonia
- Focal dystonia
- Stuttering
