= Thespis (plant) =

Scientific classification
- Kingdom: Plantae
- Clade: Embryophytes
- Clade: Tracheophytes
- Clade: Angiosperms
- Clade: Eudicots
- Clade: Asterids
- Order: Asterales
- Family: Asteraceae
- Subfamily: Asteroideae
- Tribe: Astereae
- Subtribe: Eschenbachiinae
- Genus: Thespis; DC.

Type species
- Thespis divaricata DC.

Genus of plants

Thespis is a genus of Asian plants in the tribe Astereae within the family Asteraceae.

Species

- Thespis divaricata DC. - China (Guangdong, Yunnan), Indian Subcontinent (Bangladesh, Nepal, Assam, Manipur, Meghalaya, Tripura, Tamil Nadu, West Bengal, Uttar Pradesh), Indochina
- Thespis erecta DC. - India, Laos, Myanmar, Vietnam
- Thespis integrifolia Gagnep. - Vietnam
- Thespis tonkinensis Gagnep. - Vietnam
