= Blepharospasm =

Abnormal contraction or twitch of the eyelid

- Other names: Eye dystonia, Eye twitching, Eye spasm
- Pronunciation: /ˌblɛfəroʊˈspæzəm/
- Specialty: Neurology, ophthalmology

Blepharospasm is a neurological disorder characterized by intermittent, involuntary spasms and contractions of the orbicularis oculi (eyelid) muscles around both eyes. These result in abnormal twitching or blinking, and in the extreme, sustained eyelid closure resulting in functional blindness.

The word blepharospasm is derived from the Greek: βλέφαρον / blepharon, eyelid, and σπασμός / spasmos, spasm, an uncontrolled muscle contraction. The condition should be distinguished from the more common, and milder, involuntary quivering of an eyelid, known as myokymia or fasciculation.

Blepharospasm is one form of a group of movement disorders called dystonia. It may be a primary or secondary disorder. The primary disorder is benign essential blepharospasm, in which term the qualifier essential indicates that the cause is unknown. Blepharospasm may occur as secondary to conditions including dry eyes and other specific ocular disease or conditions, Meige's syndrome and other forms of dystonia, and Parkinson's disease and other movement disorders.

Blepharospasm occurs in middle age and is more frequent among women than men. The most common treatments are medication and periodic injections of botulinum toxin into the eyelid muscles.

== Epidemiology ==
Blepharospasm is a fairly rare disease. Estimates of incidence and prevalence vary, tending to be higher in population studies than service studies, likely because of delays in diagnosis. In the United States, approximately 2,000 new cases of blepharospasm are diagnosed each year. Estimates of incidence per million persons-years range from 14.5 in Northern California to 100 in Taiwan. Estimates of prevalence per million range from 12 in Olmsted County, Minnesota to 133 in Puglia, Southern Italy.

The onset of blepharospasm tends to be during the ages 40–60. The condition is roughly more than twice as frequent among females than males, which may be related to menopause and hormone treatments. In Taiwan, the condition is more frequent among white- than blue-collar workers.

== Signs and symptoms ==
Blepharospasm usually begins with occasional twitches of both eyelids, which progress over time to forceful and frequent spasms and contractions of the eyelids. In severe episodes, the patient cannot open their eyelids (apraxia), which severely limits their daily activities. Prolonged closure of the eyelids may result in functional blindness.

Patients suffering from blepharospasm also report sensory symptoms including sensitivity to light, dry eyes, and burning sensation and grittiness in the eyes. Although such symptoms tend to precede the onset of the blepharospasm, they may both be due to a common third factor.

Typically, the symptoms—spasms and contractions of the eyelids—tend to worsen when the patient relaxes but abate during sleep. The symptoms may be temporarily alleviated by sensory tricks (geste antagoniste) including stretching or rubbing the eyebrows, eyelids, or forehead, and singing, talking, or humming. Blepharospasm is aggravated by fatigue, stress, and environmental factors such as wind or air pollution.

Although blepharospasm is defined as a bilaterally symmetric disorder that affects both eyes, some research has reported unilateral onset.

== Causes ==
Historically, it was believed that blepharospasm was due to the abnormal functioning of the brain's basal ganglia. The basal ganglia are structures in the brain that are involved in the regulation of motor and reward functions.

However, blepharospasm is now known to involve several regions of the brain and to be a multifactorial condition in which "one or several as yet unknown genes together with epigenetic and environmental factors combine to reach the threshold that induces the disease".

Blepharospasm is often associated with dry eyes, but the causal mechanism is still not clear. Research in New York and Italy suggests that increased blinking (which may be triggered by dry eyes) leads to blepharospasm. A case control study in China found that blepharospasm aggravated dry eyes.

Blepharospasm may be associated with dystonia in other parts of the body, particularly Meige's Syndrome. Blepharospasm may be associated with Parkinson's Disease, but the causal mechanism is still not clear. In rare cases, blepharospasm is associated with multiple sclerosis.

Some drugs can induce blepharospasm, including those used to treat depression and Parkinson's disease. Hormone replacement therapy for women going through menopause has been found to be associated with dry eyes, which in turn is associated with blepharospasm.

Blepharospasm can be caused by concussions in some rare cases, when a blow to the back of the head damages the basal ganglia.

Blepharospasm is associated with exposure to the sun.

== Diagnosis ==
No laboratory tests exist with which to definitively diagnose blepharospasm. Historically, the condition was frequently misdiagnosed, often as a psychiatric condition.

Diagnosis of blepharospasm has been enhanced by the proposal of objective diagnostic criteria that start from "stereotyped, bilateral and synchronous orbicularis oculi spasms" and proceed to the identification of a "sensory trick" or "increased blinking". The criteria have been validated across multiple ethnicities in multiple centers.

== Treatment ==
Standard first line treatments of blepharospasm are conservative therapies, oral medication, and periodic injections of botulinum toxin.

Particularly when associated with dry eyes, blepharospasm may be relieved with warm compresses, eye drops, and eye wipes. A Japanese study showed that warm compresses containing menthol were more effective in increasing tear film.

Drugs used to treat blepharospasm are anticholinergics, benzodiazepines, baclofen, and tetrabenazine. The proportion of patients who benefited from anticholinergics ranged from 1 in 9 in Oregon to 1 in 5 in England. Besides failing to resolve the blepharospasm, some drugs present the risk of side effects. In Japan, use of etizolam and benzodiazepine was associated with the development of blepharospasm. A case report from Sri Lanka suggests treatment with Mosapride.

The main first-line therapy is periodic injections of botulinum toxin type A to induce localized, partial paralysis of the eyelid muscles. Injections are generally administered at intervals of around 10 weeks, with variations based on patient response and usually give fairly quick relief from the muscle spasms. An English study reported that 118 (78%) of 151 patients experienced significant relief of symptoms for a mean duration of 9.2 weeks. However, in a minority of patients, the injections do not provide any symptomatic relief. Injections of botulinum toxin may diminish in effectiveness with prolonged use and require increased dosage. Injections of botulinum toxin increase the risk of visual complaints and ptosis (eyelid droop).

Patients who do not respond well to medication or botulinum toxin injections are candidates for surgical therapy. The most effective surgical treatment has been protractor myectomy, the removal of muscles responsible for eyelid closure. Myectomy is more effective than distal neurectomy.

A case report from California suggests the use of intense pulsed light therapy to relieve blepharospasm. Patients suffering from blepharospasm may get relief by wearing spectacles fitted to lift the upper eyelid. Among complementary therapies, two simulate sensory tricks: Attaching a device to spectacle frames to press on the patient's temple, and applying thin cosmetic tapes to the forehead and eyebrows. Another complementary therapy is retraining the brain to "rewire" itself and eliminate dystonic movements. Associated with Joaquin Farias, sensorimotor retraining activities and proprioceptive stimulation aim to induce neuroplasticity, making it possible for patients to recover substantial function that was lost due to blepharospasm. Complementary therapies lack evidence of the highest quality (Level 1).

== Research ==
The U.S. National Library of Medicine maintains a register of clinical trials of therapies to treat blepharospasm.

== Multimedia ==
Blepharospasm Research Foundation

- Victoria S. Pelak, Relationships of Blepharospasm to Ophthalmic Conditions such as Dry Eye, BEBRF Symposium, August 6, 2016.
- Charles N.S. Soparkar, Blepharospasm and dry eyes, BEBRF Symposium, September 9, 2017.
- Complementary/alternative therapies, Philadelphia, October 9, 2021

Neuroplasticity training

- Federico Bitti, "Dystonia. Rewiring the brain through movement and dance", TEDxNapoli
- Joaquin Farias, "How your movements can heal your brain", TEDxNapoli
