= 2002 NHK Trophy =

- Type: Grand Prix
- Date: November 28 – December 1
- Season: 2002–03
- Location: Kyoto
- Venue: Kyoto Aquarena

Champions
- Men's singles: (Russia) Ilia Klimkin
- Ladies' singles: (Japan) Yoshie Onda
- Pairs: (China) Shen Xue / Zhao Hongbo
- Ice dance: (Russia) Irina Lobacheva / Ilia Averbukh
- Previous: 2001 NHK Trophy
- Next: 2003 NHK Trophy
- Previous GP: 2002 Cup of Russia
- Next GP: 2002–03 Grand Prix Final

The 2002 NHK Trophy was the final event of six in the 2002–03 ISU Grand Prix of Figure Skating, a senior-level international invitational competition series. It was held at the Kyoto Aquarena in Kyoto on November 28 – December 1. Medals were awarded in the disciplines of men's singles, ladies' singles, pair skating, and ice dancing. Skaters earned points toward qualifying for the 2002–03 Grand Prix Final. The compulsory dance was the Tango Romantica.

== Results ==
=== Men ===
Rank	Name	Nation	TFP	SP	FS
1	Ilia Klimkin	Russia	2.0	2	1
2	Takeshi Honda	Japan	2.5	1	2
3	Li Chengjiang	China	4.5	3	3
4	Li Yunfei	China	6.5	5	4
5	Jeffrey Buttle	Canada	7.0	4	5
6	Vincent Restencourt	France	9.5	7	6
7	Yamato Tamura	Japan	11.0	6	8
8	Daisuke Takahashi	Japan	12.0	10	7
9	Hristo Turlakov	Bulgaria	13.0	8	9
10	Benjamin Miller	United States	14.5	9	10

=== Ladies ===
Rank	Name	Nation	TFP	SP	FS
1	Yoshie Onda	Japan	1.5	1	1
2	Irina Slutskaya	Russia	4.0	4	2
3	Shizuka Arakawa	Japan	4.0	2	3
4	Fumie Suguri	Japan	5.5	3	4
5	Galina Maniachenko	Ukraine	7.5	5	5
6	Elena Sokolova	Russia	9.0	6	6
7	Sarah Meier	Switzerland	11.5	9	7
8	Amber Corwin	United States	11.5	7	8
9	Marianne Dubuc	Canada	13.0	8	9
10	Fang Dan	China	15.0	10	10
11	Julia Lautowa	Austria	16.5	11	11

=== Pairs ===
Rank	Name	Nation	TFP	SP	FS
1	Shen Xue / Zhao Hongbo	China	1.5	1	1
2	Dorota Zagórska / Mariusz Siudek	Poland	3.0	2	2
3	Anabelle Langlois / Patrice Archetto	Canada	5.0	4	3
4	Maria Petrova / Alexei Tikhonov	Russia	5.5	3	4
5	Yuko Kawaguchi / Alexander Markuntsov	Japan	8.0	6	5
6	Kateřina Beránková / Otto Dlabola	Czech Republic	8.5	5	6
7	Kristen Roth / Michael McPherson	United States	10.5	7	7

=== Ice dancing ===
Rank	Name	Nation	TFP	CD	OD	FD
1	Irina Lobacheva / Ilia Averbukh	Russia	2.0	1	1	1
2	Kati Winkler / René Lohse	Germany	4.4	3	2	2
3	Galit Chait / Sergei Sakhnovski	Israel	5.6	2	3	3
4	Isabelle Delobel / Olivier Schoenfelder	France	8.0	4	4	4
5	Sylwia Nowak / Sebastian Kolasiński	Poland	10.0	5	5	5
6	Megan Wing / Aaron Lowe	Canada	12.0	6	6	6
7	Ekaterina Gvozdkova / Timur Alaskhanov	Russia	14.4	8	7	7
8	Kimberly Navarro / Robert Shmalo	United States	16.4	9	8	8
9	Zhang Weina / Cao Xianming	China	19.4	11	10	9
10	Nozomi Watanabe / Akiyuki Kido	Japan	19.4	10	9	10
11	Rie Arikawa / Kenji Miyamoto	Japan	22.4	12	11	11
WD	Marika Humphreys / Vitali Baranov	United Kingdom		7		
