= Slav Baboshin =

Russian ice dancer, coach and choreographer

Vyacheslav "Slav" Aleksandrovich Baboshin (also romanized Baboshyn) is a Russian ice dancer, coach and choreographer based in Australia.

== Career ==
Baboshin was coached by Aleksandr Treshov at the Spartak Club in Moscow. He competed in ice dancing partnered with Elena Volkova. They were the 1973-1975 Russian ice dance champions. Baboshin was awarded the rank of Master of Sports of the USSR under the Unified Sports Classification System of the USSR.

Baboshin studied at the Government Sports Institute of Moscow, Russia, where he graduated with a Diploma in Physical Education and a Diploma in Figure Skating Coaching.

From 1977 until 1987, Baboshin was a soloist with the Ukrainian Ballet on Ice based in Kiev, Ukraine, where he was also an assistant ballet master.

In 1988, Baboshin moved to Warsaw, Poland to coach figure skating. The following year he immigrated to Australia to coach at the Ice World Acacia Ridge rink in Brisbane. Baboshin later moved to Sydney to coach at the Blacktown Ice Arena, and since 1998 he has coached at Sydney's Macquarie Ice Rink. He is registered as a coach with the Australian Professional Skaters' Association.

Baboshin's notable students include the Polish national skating team, Tracey Damigella, Tamara Heggen, Chantal Loyer & Justin Bell. He has also choreographed the programs of numerous skaters, including Miriam Manzano and Nicholas Fernandez, as well as ice shows and exhibitions.

Baboshin is the coach and choreographer of the 'Ice Storm' Theatre on Ice team, which placed first at the 2007 and 2008 Australian Masters Cup & Adult Interpretive competitions.

Baboshin choreographed the opening and closing ceremonies of the 1995 World Junior Figure Skating Championships, held in Brisbane, Australia.
