= Yvars =

Yvars is a surname. Notable people with the surname include:

- Sal Yvars (1924–2008), American baseball player
- Stéphane Yvars (born c. 1970), Canadian figure skater
