= Ilia Klimkin =

Russian figure skater

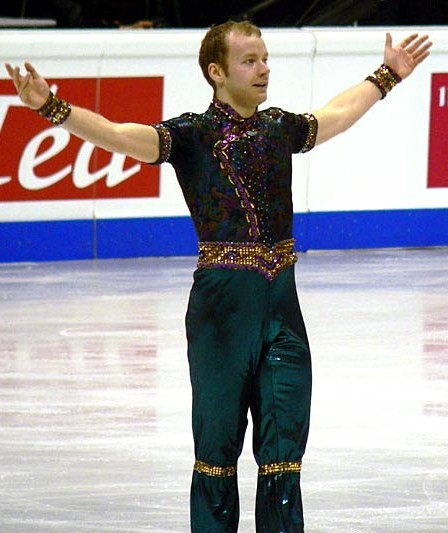
- Klimkin in 2006.

Personal information
- Native name: Илья Сергеевич Климкин
- Full name: Ilia Sergeyevich Klimkin
- Born: 15 August 1980 (age 46) Moscow, Russian SFSR, Soviet Union
- Height: 1.70 m (5 ft 7 in)

Figure skating career
- Country: Russia
- Skating club: SC Moskvich
- Retired: 19 April 2007
Medal record
Representing Russia
Figure skating: Men's singles
European Championships
Bronze medal – third place	2004 Budapest	Men's singles
Grand Prix Final
Silver medal – second place	2002–03 St. Petersburg	Men's singles
World Junior Championships
Gold medal – first place	1999 Zagreb	Men's singles
Junior Grand Prix Final
Silver medal – second place	1998–99 Detroit	Men's singles

Ilia Sergeyevich Klimkin (Russian: Илья Серге́евич Климкин, born 15 August 1980) is a Russian former competitive figure skater. He is the 2003 Grand Prix Final silver medalist, the 2004 European bronze medalist, the 1999 World Junior champion, and a three-time Russian national silver medalist.

== Personal life ==
Klimkin was born on 15 August 1980 in Moscow, Russian SFSR, Soviet Union.

== Career ==
Klimkin's grandmother introduced him to skating at the age of four because she felt it would be good for his health. He was coached by Igor Rusakov for thirteen years until Rusakov's sudden death in July 2003. He was then coached by Viktor Kudriavtsev.

At the 1999 Nebelhorn Trophy, Klimkin became the first skater to land two different quadruple jumps in one program, which he did by landing a quad salchow and a quad toe loop in the free skate. Klimkin spins in both directions, and is also known for his cantilever.

In the summer of 2003, Klimkin had a calf injury which became infected and required three surgeries; he returned to the ice in late September and won 2002 NHK Trophy two months later. In the fall of 2004, he underwent surgery on his Achilles tendon, keeping him off the ice for four months; after another three months, he was able to practice jumps. He did not compete in the 2004–05 season.

He announced his retirement from competitive skating on 19 April 2007.

== Programs ==
Season	Short program	Free skating	Exhibition
2006–07	Selection performed by Vanessa-Mae	The Mask by Jose Norman	
2005–06	1001 Nights	The Matrix Reloaded; The Matrix Revolutions	
2003–04	Swan Lake by Pyotr Tchaikovsky	Dr. Diesel by Hugues le Bars	Only Time by Enya
2002–03	X-Files by Hugues le Bars	Sunny Boy by René Aubry; Dr. Diesel by Hugues le Bars	Belle (from Notre-Dame de Paris)
2001–02	Notre-Dame de Paris by Riccardo Cocciante; Tu vas me détruire; Les sans-papiers	Petrushka by Alexander Berman	Your love will kill me (from Notre-Dame de Paris)

== Results ==
GP: Grand Prix; JGP: Junior Grand Prix

International
Event	97–98	98–99	99–00	00–01	01–02	02–03	03–04	05–06	06–07
Olympics								11th	
Worlds						9th	WD	10th	
Europeans					6th	4th	3rd	5th	
GP Final				4th		2nd			
GP Cup of China							6th		
GP Cup of Russia			8th	2nd	5th			9th	3rd
GP Lalique/Bompard						7th			4th
GP NHK Trophy			3rd	2nd		1st			
GP Skate America					5th				
Finlandia Trophy				6th	1st	3rd			
Golden Spin								3rd	
Nebelhorn Trophy			1st						
Top Jump				1st		8th			
International: Junior
Junior Worlds	4th	1st	4th						
JGP Final		2nd							
JGP Bulgaria	6th	1st							
JGP Hungary	5th	1st							
National
Russian Champ.		10th	5th	4th	3rd	2nd	2nd	2nd	4th
Russian Jr. Champ.			1st						
