= Luc Monéger =

French ice dancer

Personal information
- Born: 4 March 1974 (age 52) Angers, France
- Height: 1.66 m (5 ft 5 1/2 in)

Figure skating career
- Country: France

Luc Monéger (born 4 March 1974) is a French former ice dancer. With partner Bérangère Nau, he is the 1993 Penta Cup champion, 1993 Grand Prix International St. Gervais bronze medalist, 1993 World Junior bronze medalist, and 1994 French national bronze medalist. The duo represented France at the 1994 Winter Olympics, placing 14th.

== Results ==
With Nau

International
Event	91–92	92–93	93–94	94–95
Winter Olympics			14th	
International de Paris			4th	
International St. Gervais			3rd	
Penta Cup			1st	
Skate Canada				9th
International: Junior
World Junior Champ.	9th	3rd		
National
French Championships			3rd	4th
