= 2002–03 Grand Prix of Figure Skating Final =

Figure skating competition

2002–03 Grand Prix Final
- Type: Grand Prix
- Date: February 28 – March 2, 2003
- Season: 2002–03
- Location: Saint Petersburg, Russia
- Venue: Ice Palace

Champions
- Men's singles: (Russia) Evgeni Plushenko
- Ladies' singles: (United States) Sasha Cohen
- Pairs: (Russia) Tatiana Totmianina / Maxim Marinin
- Ice dance: (Russia) Irina Lobacheva / Ilia Averbukh
- Previous: 2001–02 Grand Prix Final
- Next: 2003–04 Grand Prix Final
- Previous GP: 2002 NHK Trophy

The 2002–03 Grand Prix of Figure Skating Final was an elite figure skating competition held from February 28 to March 2, 2003 in Saint Petersburg, Russia. Medals were awarded in men's singles, ladies' singles, pair skating, and ice dancing. Unlike most competitions that season, the compulsory dance was not part of the ice dancing competition at the Grand Prix Final.

The Grand Prix Final was the culminating event of the ISU Grand Prix of Figure Skating series, which at the time consisted of Skate America, Skate Canada International, Bofrost Cup on Ice, Trophée Lalique, Cup of Russia, and NHK Trophy competitions. The top six skaters from each discipline competed in the final.

In the 2002–03 season, competitors at the Grand Prix Final performed a short program, followed by two free skating or free dance programs. This was implemented because of television coverage. Ottavio Cinquanta envisioned that the skaters would perform two new free skating programs for the season at the final and this would appeal to and help attract viewers. Instead, most skaters went back to an old free skating program for one of the free skatings. Due to the failure of this plan, the second free skating/dance was eventually removed from the Grand Prix Final.

== Results ==
=== Men ===
Rank	Name	Nation	TFP	SP	FS1	FS2
1	Evgeni Plushenko	Russia	2.0	1	1	1
2	Ilia Klimkin	Russia	4.0	2	2	2
3	Brian Joubert	France	7.0	4	4	3
4	Alexander Abt	Russia	8.0	3	3	5
5	Li Chengjiang	China	9.4	6	5	4
6	Zhang Min	China	11.6	5	6	6

=== Ladies ===
Rank	Name	Nation	TFP	SP	FS1	FS2
1	Sasha Cohen	United States	2.6	1	2	1
2	Irina Slutskaya	Russia	3.4	2	1	2
3	Viktoria Volchkova	Russia	7.0	3	3	4
4	Shizuka Arakawa	Japan	7.8	6	4	3
5	Elena Liashenko	Ukraine	9.6	4	5	5
6	Fumie Suguri	Japan	11.6	5	6	6

=== Pairs ===
Rank	Name	Nation	TFP	SP	FS1	FS2
1	Tatiana Totmianina / Maxim Marinin	Russia	2.0	1	1	1
2	Shen Xue / Zhao Hongbo	China	4.0	2	2	2
3	Maria Petrova / Alexei Tikhonov	Russia	6.0	3	3	3
4	Julia Obertas / Alexei Sokolov	Russia	8.0	4	4	4
5	Dorota Zagórska / Mariusz Siudek	Poland	10.0	5	5	5
6	Anabelle Langlois / Patrice Archetto	Canada	12.0	6	6	6

=== Ice dancing ===
Rank	Name	Nation	TFP	OD	FD1	FD2
1	Irina Lobacheva / Ilia Averbukh	Russia	2.0	1	1	1
2	Tatiana Navka / Roman Kostomarov	Russia	4.0	2	2	2
3	Albena Denkova / Maxim Staviski	Bulgaria	6.0	3	3	3
4	Elena Grushina / Ruslan Goncharov	Ukraine	8.0	4	4	4
5	Galit Chait / Sergei Sakhnovski	Israel	10.0	5	5	5
6	Marie-France Dubreuil / Patrice Lauzon	Canada	12.0	6	6	6
