= Penta Cup =

The Penta Cup International (also known as the Novarat Trophy and Danubius Thermal Trophy) was an international figure skating competition in Hungary. It formed the Donaupokal (Danube Cup) along with Austria's Karl Schäfer Memorial. Medals were awarded in the disciplines of men's singles, ladies' singles, and ice dancing on the senior and junior levels. In 1987, the competition was held in November.

== Senior medalists ==
=== Men ===
Senior men
| Season | Title Location | Gold | Silver | Bronze | Details |
|---|---|---|---|---|---|
| 1985–86 | Danubius Thermal Trophy | (United States) Angelo D'Agostino | (Soviet Union) Yuri Bureiko | (France) Laurent Depouilly | |
| 1986–87 | Novarat Trophy | (Canada) Brian Orser | (United States) Doug Mattis | (United States) Mark Mitchell | |
| 1987–88 | Novarat Trophy | (United States) Brian Boitano | (Australia) Cameron Medhurst | (Canada) Neil Paterson | |
| 1988–89 | Novarat Trophy | (United States) Mark Mitchell | (Sweden) Peter Johansson | (Canada) Stephane Yvars | |
| 1989–90 | Novarat Trophy | (Soviet Union) Viacheslav Zagorodniuk | (United States) Daniel Doran | (East Germany) Ronny Winkler | |
| 1992–93 | Penta Cup; Budapest | (France) Thierry Cerez | (Romania) Marius Negrea | (Hungary) Szabolcs Vidrai | |
| 1993–94 | Penta Cup; Székesfehérvár | (Hungary) Zsolt Kerekes | (Canada) Matthew Hall | (Hungary) Szabolcs Vidrai | |

=== Ladies ===
Senior ladies
| Season | Title Location | Gold | Silver | Bronze | Details |
|---|---|---|---|---|---|
| 1985–86 | Danubius Thermal Trophy | (United States) Yvonne Gomez | (Japan) Izumi Aotani | (Japan) Sachie Yuki | |
| 1986–87 | Novarat Trophy | (United States) Cindy Bortz | (Canada) Charlene Wong | (United States) Tonia Kwiatkowski | |
| 1987–88 | Novarat Trophy | (United States) Tracey Damigella | (West Germany) Carola Wolff | (East Germany) Evelyn Grossmann | |
| 1988–89 | Novarat Trophy | (United States) Nancy Kerrigan | (Hungary) Tamara Teglassy | (Switzerland) K. Schroeter | |
| 1989–90 | Novarat Trophy | (Canada) Josée Chouinard | (East Germany) Tanja Krienke | (United States) Holly Cook | |
| 1992–93 | Penta Cup; Budapest | | | | |
| 1993–94 | Penta Cup; Székesfehérvár | (Hungary) Krisztina Czakó | (Germany) Astrid Hochstetter | (Switzerland) Nicole Skoda | |

=== Ice dancing ===
Senior ice dancing
| Season | Title Location | Gold | Silver | Bronze | Details |
|---|---|---|---|---|---|
| 1985–86 | Danubius Thermal Trophy | (Soviet Union) Maia Usova / Alexander Zhulin | (Hungary) Klara Engi / Attila Toth | (United States) Lois-Marie Luciani / Russ Witherby | |
| 1986–87 | Novarat Trophy | (Canada) Tracy Wilson / Rob McCall | (Hungary) Klara Engi / Attila Toth | (Soviet Union) Larisa Fedorinova / Evgeni Platov | |
| 1987–88 | Novarat Trophy | (Hungary) Klara Engi / Attila Toth | (Soviet Union) Ilona Melnichenko / Gennady Kaskov | (Italy) Stefania Calegari / Pasquale Camerlengo | |
| 1988–89 | Novarat Trophy | (Soviet Union) Larisa Fedorinova / Evgeni Platov | (United States) Jodie Balogh / Jerod Swallow | (Hungary) Krisztina Kerekes / Csaba Szentpéteri | |
| 1989–90 | Novarat Trophy | (Soviet Union) Ludmila Berezova / Vladimir Fedorov | (United States) Elizabeth McLean / Ari Lieb | (Czechoslovakia) Monika Mandikova / Oliver Pekar | |
| 1992–93 | Penta Cup; Budapest | | | | |
| 1993–94 | Penta Cup; Székesfehérvár | (France) Bérangère Nau / Luc Monéger | (Canada) Janet Emerson / Steve Kavanagh | (Italy) Laura Bonardi / Alessandro Reani | |

== Junior medalists ==
=== Men ===
Junior men
| Season | Title Location | Gold | Silver | Bronze | Details |
|---|---|---|---|---|---|
| 1995–96 | Penta Cup; Székesfehérvár | (France) Alexandre Boudjadi | (Italy) Edoardo De Bernadis | (Hungary) Zoltán Kőszegi | |

=== Ladies ===
Junior ladies
| Season | Title Location | Gold | Silver | Bronze | Details |
|---|---|---|---|---|---|
| 1995–96 | Penta Cup; Székesfehérvár | (Hungary) Júlia Sebestyén | (Hungary) Diána Póth | | |

=== Ice dancing ===
Junior ice dancing
| Season | Title Location | Gold | Silver | Bronze | Details |
|---|---|---|---|---|---|
| 1992–93 | Penta Cup; Budapest | | (France) Dominique Deniaud / Martial Jaffredo | (Italy) Francesca Fermi / Andrea Baldi | |
| 1995–96 | Penta Cup; Székesfehérvár | (Russia) Ekaterina Davydova / Roman Kostomarov | | | |
