= Steve Kavanagh =

Canadian ice dancer

Personal information
- Other names: Steven Kavanagh
- Born: Oakville, Ontario

Figure skating career
- Country: Canada
- Partner: Christine Fuller; Janet Emerson; Danielle Ballagh
- Retired: c. 1998

Steve Kavanagh (born in Oakville, Ontario) is a Canadian former competitive ice dancer. With Janet Emerson, he is the 1993 Penta Cup silver medalist and a two-time Canadian national bronze medalist (1995 and 1996). They competed together at two Champions Series (Grand Prix) events – 1995 Skate America and 1995 Trophée de France. Kavanagh also competed with Danielle Ballagh and Christine Fuller.

== Competitive highlights ==
GP: Champions Series (Grand Prix)

=== With Fuller ===
International
Event	1996–97	1997–98
Karl Schäfer Memorial		10th
National
Canadian Championships	5th	5th

=== With Emerson ===
International
Event	1993–94	1994–95	1995–96
GP Skate America			9th
GP Trophée de France			10th
Karl Schäfer Memorial	4th		
Nations Cup		5th	
Penta Cup	2nd		
National
Canadian Champ.		3rd	3rd

=== With Ballagh ===
International: Junior
Event	1988–89	1989–90
Autumn Trophy		4th
National
Canadian Championships	3rd N	
