= Ekaterina Gvozdkova =

Russian former competitive ice dancer (born 1981)

Personal information
- Native name: Екатерина Гвоздкова
- Born: 4 August 1981 (age 44) Moscow, Russian SFSR, Soviet Union
- Height: 1.71 m (5 ft 7 1/2 in)

Figure skating career
- Country: Russia
- Partner: Timur Alaskhanov; Nikolai Morozov
- Coach: Natalia Dubova; Larisa Fedorinova
- Skating club: Profsoyuzy, Moscow
- Began skating: 1986

Ekaterina Gvozdkova (Russian: Екатерина Гвоздкова; born 4 August 1981) is a Russian former competitive ice dancer. She won the bronze medal at the 1995 Lysiane Lauret Challenge with Nikolai Morozov. With Timur Alaskhanov, she competed at three Grand Prix events and at the 2001 Winter Universiade. In the 2001–02 season, Gvozdkova/Alaskhanov were coached by Larisa Fedorinova in Moscow. The following season, they trained under Natalia Dubova in Stamford, Connecticut. As of January 2014, Gvozdkova was working as a skating coach in Stamford.

== Programs ==
(with Alaskhanov)

Season	Original dance	Free dance
2002–03	Waltz: Roses from the South; Polka: Thunder and Lightning by Johann Strauss II	Quixote by Bond; Victory; Winter by Yoad Nevo performed by Bond
2001–02	Paso doble; Tango	Carmina Burana by Carl Orff; The Messenger: The Story of Joan of Arc by Éric Serra

== Competitive highlights ==
GP: Grand Prix

=== With Alaskhanov ===
International
Event	2000–01	2001–02	2002–03
GP Cup of Russia		11th	10th
GP NHK Trophy			7th
Nebelhorn Trophy		6th	
Winter Universiade	7th		
National
Russian Championships	5th	5th	4th

=== With Morozov ===
International
Event	1994–95	1995–96
Lysiane Lauret Challenge	3rd	
International St. Gervais		5th
Nations Cup	9th	
Nebelhorn Trophy		8th
National
Russian Championships		6th
