= Cantilever (figure skating) =

Figure skating

Figure skating element
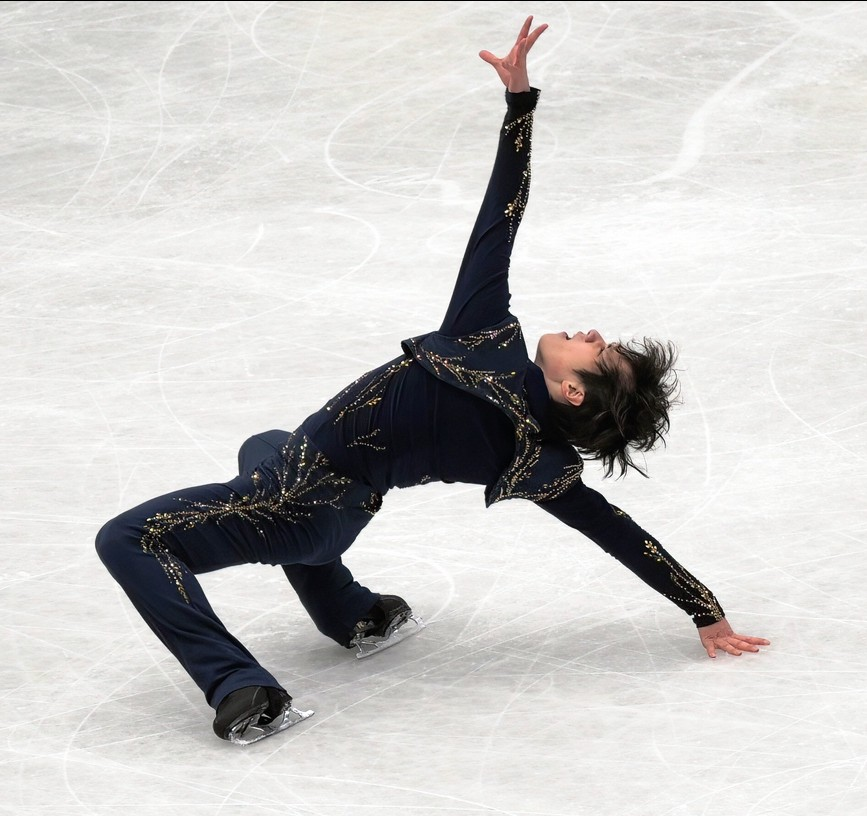
- Element name: Cantilever
- Inventor: Werner Groebli

The cantilever, also called layback spread eagle, is a figure skating element. Similar to the spread eagle, the skater travels along a deep edge. With knees bent, the skater bends their back backwards, parallel to the ice.

It was invented by Werner Groebli, better known as "Mr. Frick", a long-time show skater with Ice Follies. The first woman to perform it was Janet Lee in 1973 and was hired by as a principal skater by Ice Capades in 1986 because of it. More recently, it became a signature move of Joseph Klein, Ilia Klimkin, Elizaveta Tuktamysheva, Alexandra Trusova, and Shoma Uno. Shoma Uno also frequently uses the cantilever in exhibition performances.

== Gallery ==
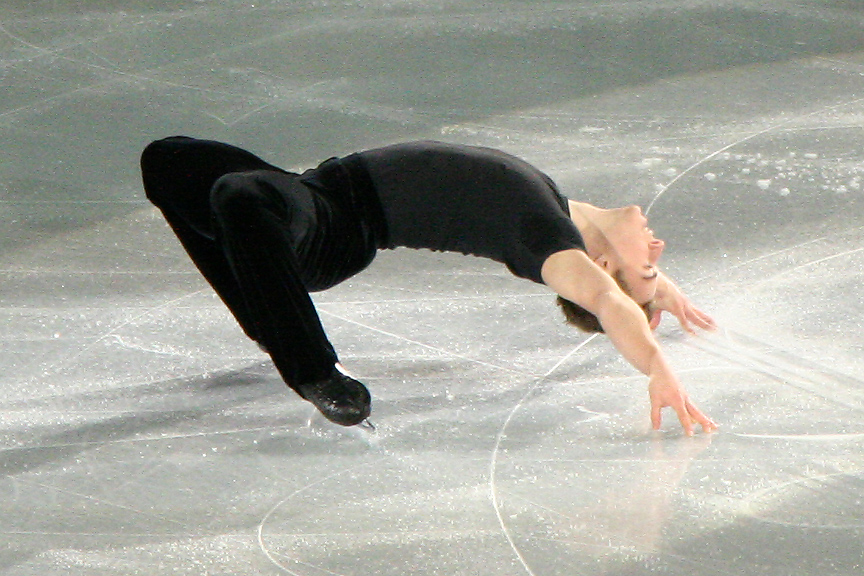
Solo cantilever with hands on ice (man)
(Shawn Sawyer)

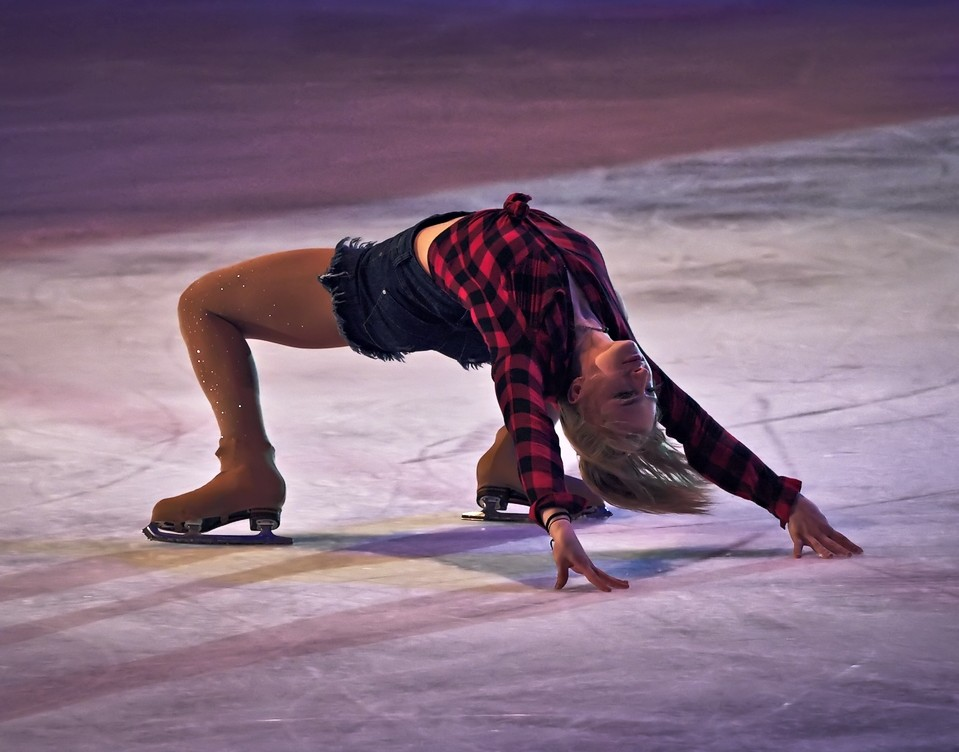
Solo cantilever with hands on ice (woman)
(Amber Glenn)

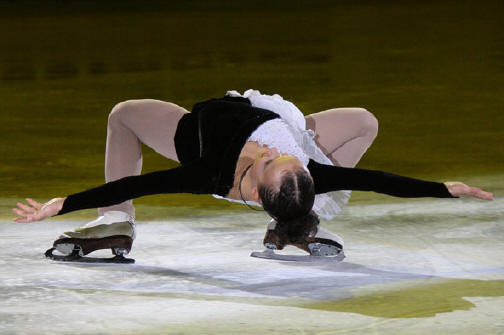
Solo cantilever without hands on ice
(Lubov Iliushechkina)

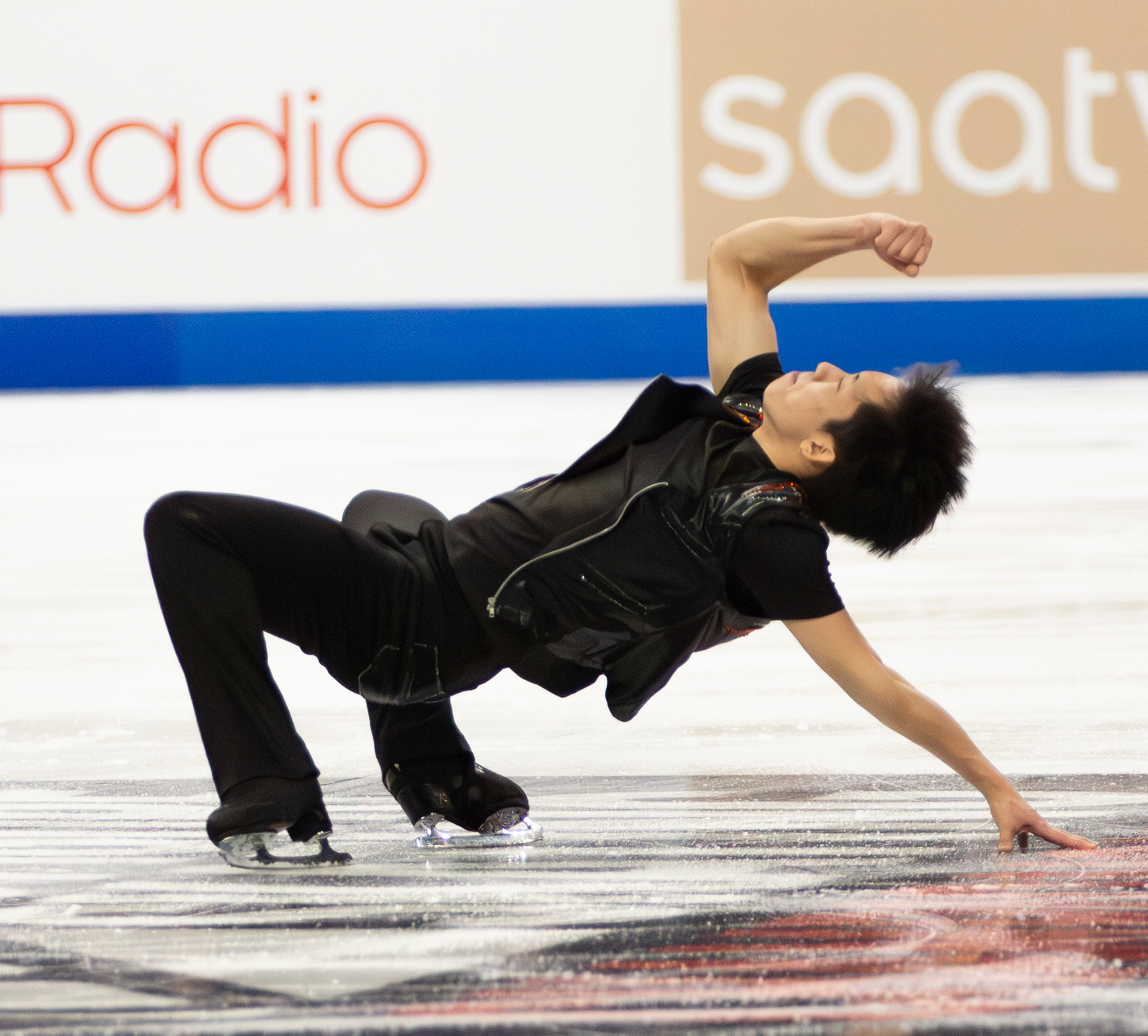
Solo cantilever
(Tomoki Hiwatashi)

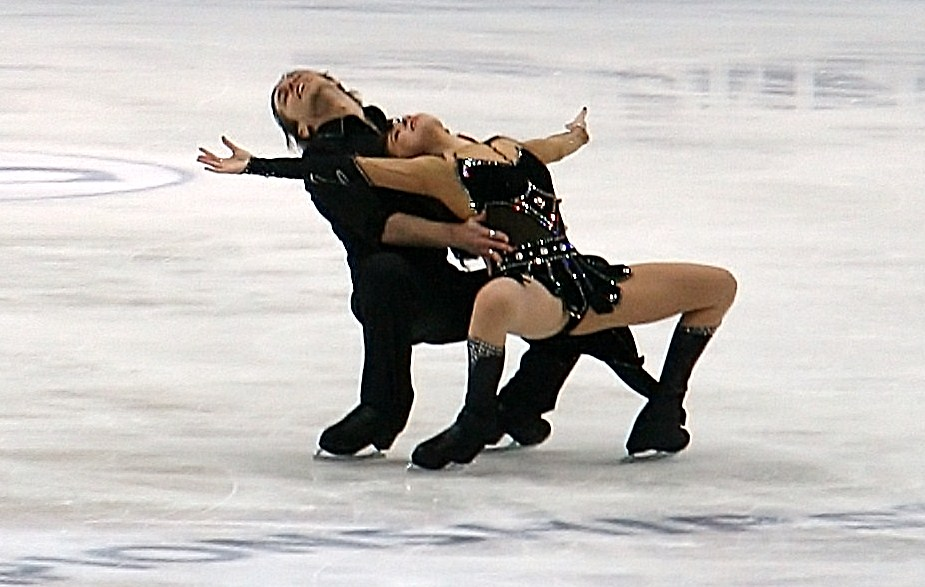
A cantilever as an ice dance element
(Allison Reed & Otar Japaridze)

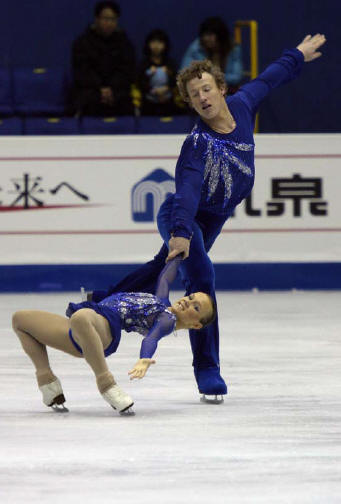
Assisted cantilever in pair skating
(Lubov Iliushechkina & Nodari Maisuradze)

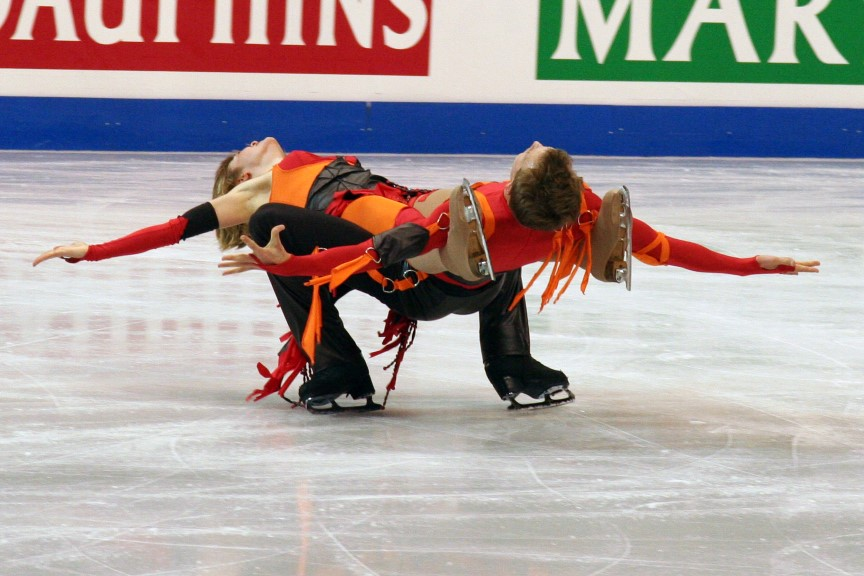
Cantilever as part of an ice dancing lift
(Zoé Blanc & Pierre-Loup Bouquet)
