= Attila Tóth =

Hungarian ice dancer (born 1965)

Personal information
- Full name: Attila Tóth
- Born: 12 April 1965 (age 61) Budapest, Hungary

Figure skating career
- Country: Hungary
- Partner: Klára Engi
- Retired: 1992

Attila Tóth (born 12 April 1965) is a retired Hungarian ice dancer. He competed with Klára Engi. Together, they placed 16th at the 1984 Winter Olympics, 7th at the 1988 Winter Olympics, and 7th at the 1992 Winter Olympics. Their highest placement at the World Figure Skating Championships was 4th, which they achieved in 1989. Their highest placement at the European Figure Skating Championships was 4th, which they achieved in 1989, 1990, and 1991. Tóth was born in Budapest.

== Results ==
(ice dance with Klára Engi)

International
Event	83–84	84–85	85–86	86–87	87–88	88–89	89–90	90–91	91–92
Olympics	16th				7th				7th
Worlds	18th	14th	11th	8th	7th	4th	WD	5th	
Europeans	17th	9th	6th	6th	6th	4th	4th	4th	5th
NHK Trophy				5th				2nd	
Skate America			4th						
Skate Canada		8th	5th						
Danse Grenoble					2nd	2nd	1st		
Danubius/Novarat			2nd	2nd	1st				
Prague Skate	7th								
St. Ivel			3rd						
National
Hungary		1st	1st	1st	1st	1st	1st	1st	1st
WD = Withdrew
