= Alexandra Ignatova =

Russian figure skater (born 2004)

- Alexandra Ignatova at the 2026 Russian Challenge

Personal information
- Native name: Александра Вячеславовна Игнатова (Russian)
- Full name: Alexandra Vyacheslavovna Ignatova
- Other names: Aleksandra Trusova
- Born: Alexandra Vyacheslavovna Trusova; 23 June 2004 (age 22) Ryazan, Russia
- Home town: Moscow, Russia
- Height: 1.65 m (5 ft 5 in)

Figure skating career
- Country: (Individual Neutral Athletes) Individual Neutral Athlete; Russia
- Coach: Eteri Tutberidze; Sergei Dudakov; Daniil Gleikhengauz
- Skating club: FS Sports Club of Eteri Tutberidze
- Began skating: 2008

Medal record
Event	Gold medal – first place	Silver medal – second place	Bronze medal – third place
Olympic Games	0	1	0
World Championships	0	0	1
European Championships	0	1	1
Grand Prix Final	0	0	1
Russian Championships	1	1	2
World Junior Championships	2	0	0
Junior Grand Prix Final	1	1	0
Medal list
Olympic Games
Silver medal – second place	2022 Beijing	Singles
World Championships
Bronze medal – third place	2021 Stockholm	Singles
European Championships
Bronze medal – third place	2020 Graz	Singles
Silver medal – second place	2022 Tallinn	Singles
Grand Prix Final
Gold medal – first place	2017–18 Nagoya	Singles
Silver medal – second place	2018–19 Vancouver	Singles
Bronze medal – third place	2019–20 Turin	Singles
Russian Championships
Gold medal – first place	2022 Saint Petersburg	Singles
Silver medal – second place	2019 Saransk	Singles
Bronze medal – third place	2020 Krasnoyarsk	Singles
Bronze medal – third place	2021 Chelyabinsk	Singles
World Junior Championships
Gold medal – first place	2018 Sofia	Singles
Gold medal – first place	2019 Zagreb	Singles

Alexandra "Sasha" Vyacheslavovna Ignatova (Russian: Александра Вячеславовна Игнатова; née Trusova [Трусова]; (Note: Russian pronunciation: [ɐlʲɪˈksandrə ˈtrusəvə].) born 23 June 2004) is a Russian figure skater who currently competes as an Individual Neutral Athlete. She is the 2022 Olympic silver medalist, the 2021 World bronze medalist, a European silver(2022) and bronze (2020) medalist, the 2019 Grand Prix Final bronze medalist and a four-time Grand Prix medalist.

Domestically, she is the 2022 Russian national champion, the 2019 silver medalist, and the 2020 and 2021 bronze medalist.

At the junior level, she has been a two-time Junior World Champion (2018 and 2019), the 2018 Junior Grand Prix Final champion, the 2019 Junior Grand Prix Final silver medalist, a four-time champion on the Junior Grand Prix series, and a two-time Russian Junior national champion.

Trusova is credited for leading the ladies' figure skating technical revolution and being the new face of women's figure skating by becoming the first female skater to land the quad Lutz, quad flip, and quad toe loop jumps; the second to land the quad salchow (after Miki Ando); and the first to land two and three ratified quads in a free skate, achieved at the 2018 Junior World Championships and the 2019 Nepela Trophy, respectively. She is also the first woman to land a quadruple jump at the Olympic Winter Games, and the first woman to land four and five quads in a free skate, achieved at the 2022 Winter Olympics. She currently holds four Guinness World Records, the fourth in recognition of her landed quadruple flip at the 2019 ISU Grand Prix Final. Her technical score of 92.35 points in the free skate at the 2018 Junior Worlds was the highest recorded in women's singles skating at the junior and senior level until the GOE (Grade of Execution) system was changed at the end of 2017–18 season.

Additionally, Trusova is recognized as the youngest woman to become a World Junior champion and a Junior Grand Prix Final champion following her wins at the 2018 World Junior Championship and the 2018 Junior Grand Prix Final at the age of 13. At the 2018 JGP Lithuania, she became the first female skater to land a quadruple jump in combination after performing a quad toe loop and triple toe loop. At the 2018 JGP Armenia, she became the first female skater to land a quad Lutz jump in international competition. She is also the first female skater to backload a quad in combination, which she accomplished at Skate Canada 2019, landing a quad Toe in combination with a triple salchow. Trusova currently has the second highest free skating score of any female skater, with 177.13. Trusova is the first and only female skater competing with four different quadruple jumps—toe loop, salchow, flip, and Lutz—and the first to score above 100 points in technical elements, with 100.20 in the free skate at 2019 Skate Canada and an Olympic record 106.16 at the 2022 Olympics. In 2026, at age 22 she became the oldest woman to land a ratified quadruple jump at the 2026 Kinoshita Group Cup.

== Personal life ==
Ignatova alongside her husband Makar Ignatov and their son, Mikhail

Alexandra Trusova was born on 23 June 2004 in Ryazan, to parents Vyacheslav and Svetlana into a sports family. She has two younger brothers, Egor and Ivan. A passionate dog lover, Trusova owns seven dogs: a chihuahua named Tina, who often accompanied her to competitions; a husky named Jack; a miniature royal poodle named Lana, which she received at the Rostelecom Cup in recognition of her victory at the 2019 World Junior Figure Skating Championships and for landing her first triple Axel in practice; a basenji named Alita; a second miniature poodle named Cruella (nicknamed Ella); a Bichon Frisé named Selma; a toy poodle named Smoke. Both Ella and Selma were gifts from fans in China. In August 2026, while participating in an ice show in China, Trusova and her husband adopted a dog named Tao-Tao from a local shelter.

A short biography detailing her career throughout her teenage years was published in Russian under the title Alexandra Trusova. The Girl Who Fights Gravity: And Changes the World of Women’s Figure Skating, with an English translation released in March 2021.

Trusova was in a relationship with Mark Kondratiuk, the 2022 Beijing Olympic Team Event bronze medalist, from May 2022 until the summer of 2023. In late 2023, she began a relationship with fellow Russian figure skater Makar Ignatov. On 17 June 2024, Trusova and Ignatov announced their engagement, and they were married on 17 August 2024, after which Trusova adopted the surname Ignatova.

On 22 March 2025, the couple publicly announced via Instagram that they were expecting their first child. On 6 August 2025, the couple welcomed their first child, a son, later revealing his name as Mikhail. Trusova started recovery shortly after giving birth and began regaining her jumps, working on triple and quadruple jumps in combinations.

In July 2026, Trusova graduated from the Faculty of Journalism at Moscow State University.

== Career ==
=== Early career ===
Trusova began learning to skate in 2008 at the age of four. She initially trained in Ryazan under the guidance of Olga Shevtsova before relocating to Moscow in 2015, where she was coached by Alexander Volkov. In 2016, she joined the Khrustalny (Crystal) rink, where she began training under Eteri Tutberidze and Sergei Dudakov.

Trusova placed fourth at the 2017 Russian Junior Championships, finishing sixth in the short program and fourth in the free skate.

=== 2017–2018 season: Junior international debut ===
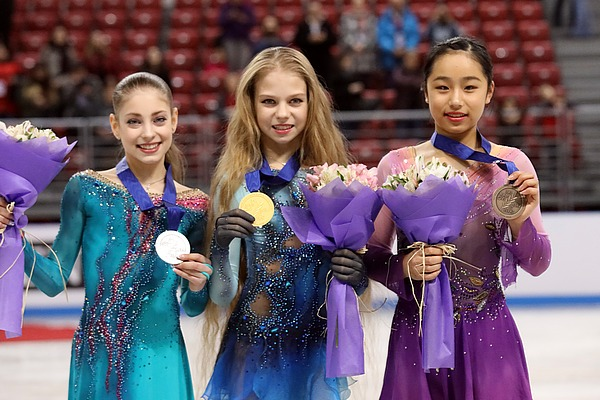
2018 World Junior Championships podium. Left to right: Alena Kostornaia, Trusova, Mako Yamashita.

Trusova debuted internationally in August 2017 at a 2017–18 ISU Junior Grand Prix (JGP) competition in Brisbane, Australia. Ranked first in both the short program and free skate, she won the gold medal ahead of teammate Anastasiia Gulyakova. She landed an underrotated quadruple salchow in her free program. Her total score of 197.69 points was the third highest ever achieved by a women's single skater on the junior level at the time, behind only Alina Zagitova and Marin Honda. She then finished first at JGP Belarus and qualified for the Junior Grand Prix Final.

At the 2017–18 Junior Grand Prix Final, Trusova scored 73.25 points, breaking the junior women's world record for the short program. In the free skate, she scored 132.36 points, approximately half a point less than what her teammate and training partner, Alena Kostornaia, scored. However, Trusova won the overall competition due to her 1.5 point-lead from the short program. In January 2018, Trusova won the gold medal at the 2018 Russian Junior Championships after placing first in the short program and third in the free skate. She again narrowly beat her training partner and silver medalist, Kostornaia, by a margin of 0.6 points.

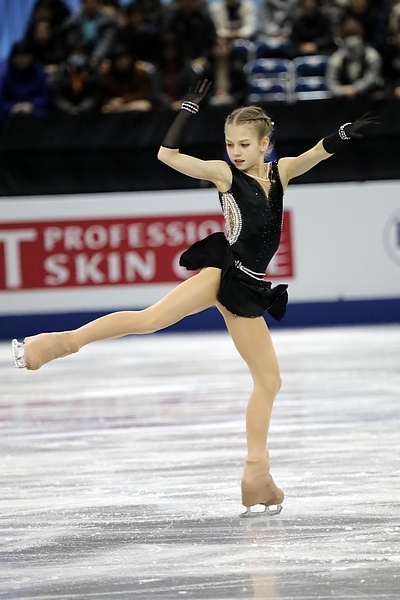
Trusova at the 2017–18 Junior Grand Prix Final

In March 2018, Trusova competed at the 2018 Junior Worlds, where she won the gold medal after placing first in both the short program and free skate. Her free skate score of 153.49 points set the new world record for the junior free program, and her total score of 225.52 points was also the new world record for the junior combined total score. At the competition, Trusova became the first female skater to land the quad toe loop, the second to land the quad salchow behind Miki Ando, and the first to land two ratified quads in a free skate. Her quadruple jump was the first ratified in 16 years since Ando's in 2002. Trusova's technical score of 92.35 points in the free skate at the 2018 Junior World was the highest recorded in women's figure skating at the time at both the junior and senior levels. Her total score of 225.52 would have placed her first in the senior women's World Championships that year as well, despite significantly lower program component scores and the absence of a choreographic sequence.

=== 2018–2019 season: Second Junior World title ===
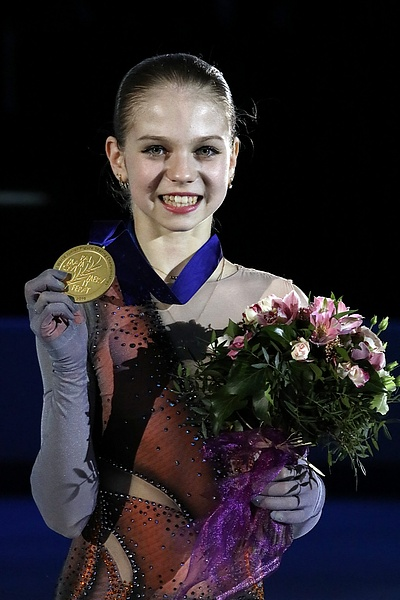
Trusova at the 2019 World Junior Championships

Trusova began the season by competing in the 2018 Junior Grand Prix (JGP) series. At her first Junior Grand Prix event of the season, she won the gold medal in Kaunas, Lithuania. She ranked first in both the short program and the free skate and won the gold medal by 30 points over silver medalist Kim Ye-lim. As of September 2018, her scores at the competition are the highest achieved in an international junior women's competition. There, Trusova became the first female skater to land a quad in combination—a quad toe loop and triple toe loop that received 16.14 points. She also became the first female skater to attempt a quad Lutz in a competition, which she landed but not ratified due to under rotation.

At her second Junior Grand Prix event of the season, she won another gold medal in Yerevan, Armenia. Again she placed first in both the short program and free skate, winning the gold medal by 33 points over silver medalist and teammate Alena Kanysheva. Trusova surpassed her own free skate world record score and became the first female skater to land a quadruple Lutz in international competition (teammate Anna Shcherbakova landed two quadruple Lutz jumps several days earlier in a domestic competition). With two Junior Grand Prix gold medals, Trusova qualified for the 2018–19 Junior Grand Prix Final.

At the JGP Final, she won the silver medal after placing second in both the short program and free skate. This time, she was outscored by Kostornaia by approximately 2.5 points. In the free skate, Trusova landed a clean quad toe loop but stepped out of her first quad Lutz and fell on a second, underrotated quad Lutz.

At the 2019 Russian Championships, Trusova placed second in the short program and second in the free skate, winning the silver medal overall. In the free skate, she landed a quad Lutz but fell on an under rotated quad toe loop, finishing behind Shcherbakova by 0.07 points. Trusova stated after the competition that she planned to work more on her quad jumps before the 2019 Junior World Championships.

Trusova successfully defended her Junior World title at the 2019 World Junior Championships, placing second in the short program to Shcherbakova and winning the free skate.

=== 2019–2020 season: Senior international debut ===
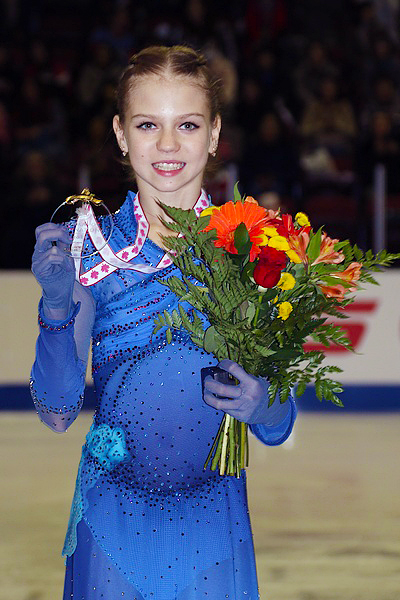
Trusova at the 2019 Skate Canada

Trusova made her international senior debut at the 2019 CS Ondrej Nepela Memorial, where she won the gold medal and set several new world records. In the free skate, she became the first woman ever to land three quadruple jumps when she landed a quad Lutz and two quad toe loops, the second of which was in combination. She set a new free skate record of 163.78 points and a new combined total record of 238.69 points. Her technical element score of 98.34 points in the free skate was also the new world record. She earned 14.72 points for her quadruple Lutz, a new record for the highest valued single jump by a female skater which was phenomenal.

On October 5, Trusova skated in the team competition at the Japan Open, where she won the event with four quads—a quad salchow, quad Lutz, quad toe-triple toe combination, and quad toe-Euler-triple salchow combination—scoring over 160 points. Since it was not an official ISU competition, her historic number of quads landed was not officially recognized as the first in international competition.

Trusova made her ISU Grand Prix debut at the 2019 Skate Canada International, where she won the gold medal after placing third in the short program and first in the free skate. At the competition, having performed quad toe loop-triple toe loop and quad toe loop-Euler-triple salchow combinations, she became the first woman to land two quad-triple jump combinations in one program at an ISU-sanctioned international competition. She also became the first woman to land a quad-triple jump combination in the second half of the free skate. At the same competition, she set the new free skating record of 166.62 points and a new combined total record of 241.02 points. Her technical score of 100.20 points in the free skate was also the new world record. At her second Grand Prix, the 2019 Rostelecom Cup, Trusova placed second in the short program behind Evgenia Medvedeva. She placed first in the free skate despite falling on her opening quad salchow attempt and another fall on a triple combination and won her second Grand Prix gold medal.

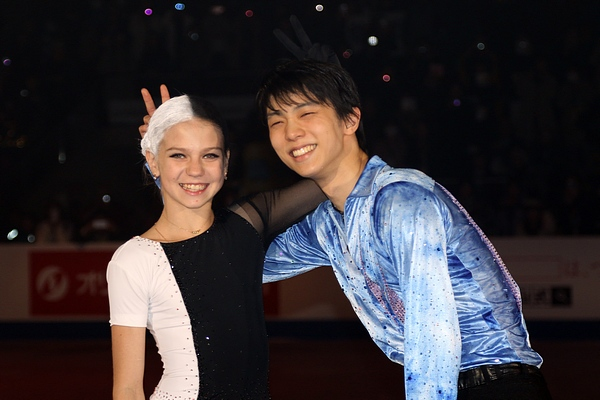
Trusova with Yuzuru Hanyu at the 2019 Skate Canada

Trusova's results qualified her for the Grand Prix Final in Turin. Skating in the short program, Trusova opted to attempt the triple Axel in competition for the first time but under rotated it and fell. Consequently, she placed fifth in the segment, 14 points behind first-place Kostornaia. Trusova said that the decision to introduce the triple axel had been taken in light of its being landed "more or less consistently" in practices in the preceding week and remarked, "I like to risk, and without risking, I wouldn't achieve what I have by this moment". In the free skate, Trusova attempted the quad flip in competition for the first time, landing it cleanly, alongside a quad Lutz and a quad toe loop, but doubled an intended quad salchow and fell on a second quad toe attempt. She became the first female skater to attempt five quads in a free skate and the first to attempt four different types of quads. Third in the free skate, she won the bronze medal behind Kostornaia and Shcherbakova.

At the 2020 Russian Championships, Trusova placed third in the short program, opting not to attempt the triple axel. The free skate proved a struggle, with two falls on her quad Lutz and quad flip attempts and doubling on her first attempted quad toe loop. She eventually landed her second quad toe attempt, as well as her remaining triple jumps, and remained in third place. She was "not pleased" with the performance and said she hoped to master the quad loop by the end of the season.

Competing at the 2020 European Championships, Trusova doubled and turned out of a planned triple Axel. She scored 74.95 points and placed third in that segment behind Kostornaia and Shcherbakova. In the free skate, she fell on two planned quads but landed her quad toe-triple toe combination successfully. She placed third overall behind her two teammates and won the bronze medal. Trusova was also assigned to compete at the 2020 World Championships in Montreal, which were cancelled as a result of the COVID-19 pandemic.

On May 6, 2020, it was announced by Russian media outlets Nevasport and Sport24 that Trusova had decided to part ways with coach Eteri Tutberidze in favor of joining Evgeni Plushenko's academy. Trusova was joined in the departure by coach Sergei Rozanov, as well as novice training-mates Veronika and Alyona Zhilina. According to Sport24, Trusova chose to leave the Tutberidze group due to lack of attention from Tutberidze herself during the months following the cancellation of the World Championships, as well as her overall dissatisfaction with her position in the training group.

=== 2020–2021 season: World bronze medal ===
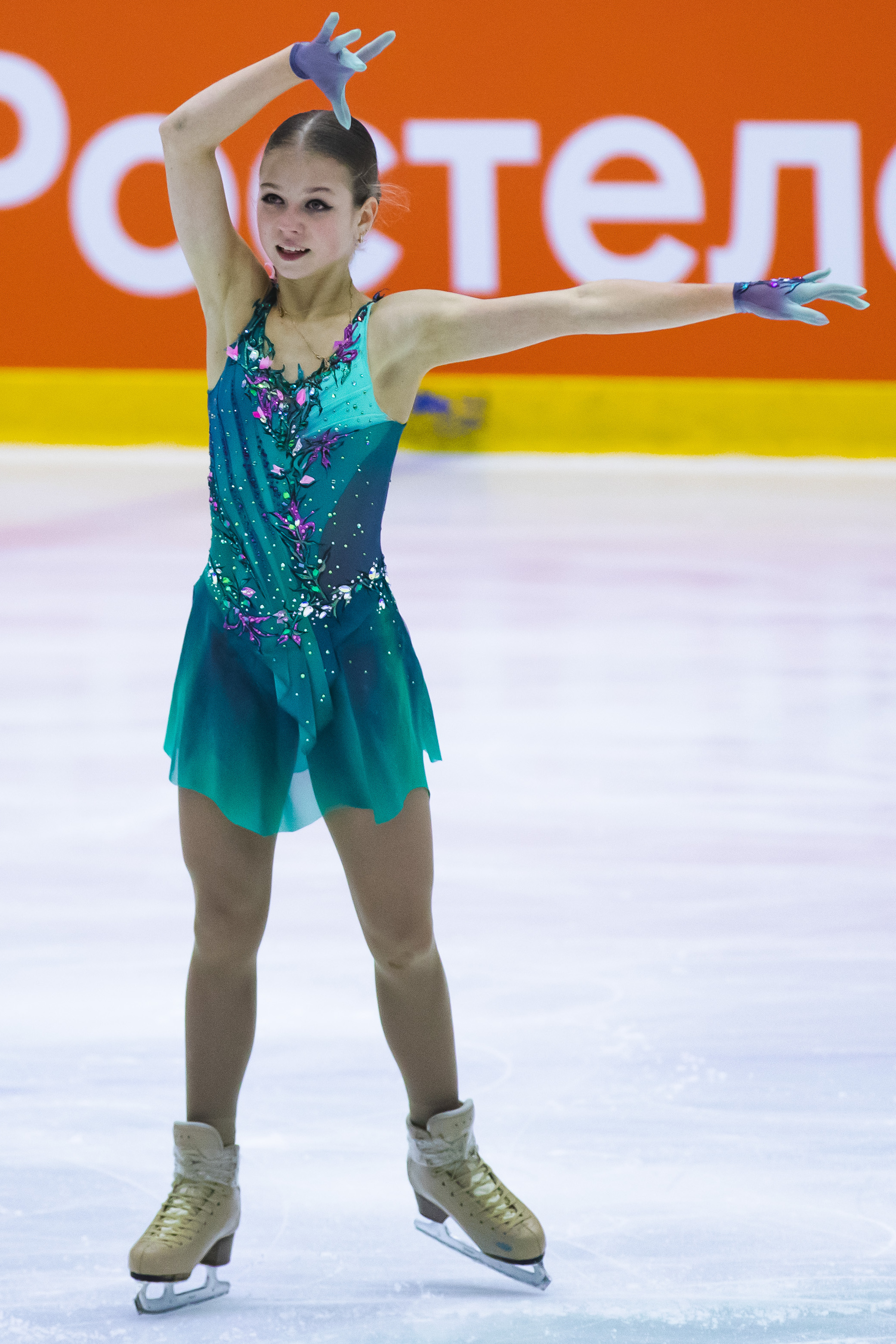
Trusova at the 2020 Rostelecom Cup

Trusova performed at the 2020 Russian Test Skates and successfully executed a quad toe in combination. At the second stage of the Russian Cup held in Moscow, Trusova made a mistake on her triple axel jump in the short program and placed third behind Kamila Valieva and Daria Usacheva. However, in the free skate, Trusova cleanly executed two quadruple toe-loops, one in combination, and won the free skate to win gold. At the fourth stage in Kazan, she stepped out on her opening triple axel in the short program and placed second behind Kostornaia. In the free skate, Trusova cleanly landed three quads but fell on a fourth, as well as on a triple jump. Despite these mistakes, she scored 171.21 points and won her second straight competition.

In the short program at the 2020 Rostelecom Cup, Trusova fell on a downgraded triple axel and, as a result, placed third behind Kostornaia and Elizaveta Tuktamysheva with a score of 70.81, which was her lowest international result since September 2017. She encountered similar problems in the free skate, falling four times and receiving negative grades of execution on two other jumping passes. Her final score of 198.93 saw her drop down to fourth place, unprecedented for Trusova in international competition, and her first off-podium finish since the 2017 Russian Junior Championships.

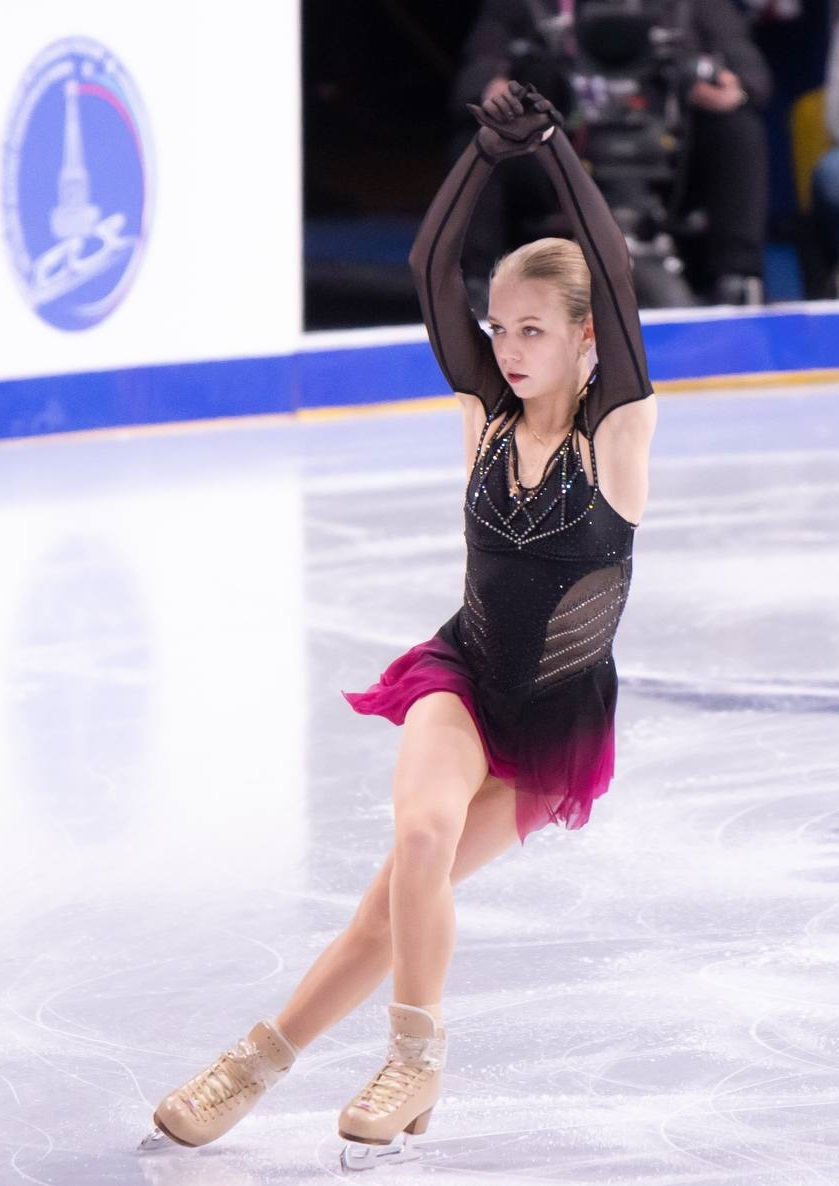
Trusova skating her free program at the 2021 Russian Figure Skating Championships

Competing at the 2021 Russian Championships, Trusova placed fourth in the short program behind Shcherbakova, Valieva, and Usacheva. She landed two quad Lutzes in the free skate, placing third in the segment and winning the bronze medal. Speaking afterward about dealing with injury, she said that "two quads in the long program is very little for me, and I'll try to do more, but for today, this was the maximum content that I was able to do".

With the European Championships cancelled, Trusova instead participated in the 2021 Channel One Trophy, a televised team event. Trusova was elected for the Time of Firsts team captained by Evgenia Medvedeva and placed fourth in the short program, the only woman on her team to skate cleanly. In the free skate, she made errors on both quad Lutz attempts, placing third in the segment, and her team finished in second place overall.

Trusova was selected to compete for the Russian Federation at the 2021 World Championships in March 2021 in Stockholm, where she was considered a favorite to make the podium. In the short program, Trusova placed twelfth after putting a hand down on her triple Lutz due to over rotation, consequently failing to execute the second part of her jump combination. In her free skate, she attempted five quads, falling on two of them; however, due to the high base value of her program, mistakes by other medal contenders, and her successful landing of three of her quads, Trusova was able to finish third overall for the bronze medal, 8.57 points ahead fourth-place skater Karen Chen. On the podium alongside Shcherbakova and Tuktamysheva, this was only the second time that a single country had swept the women's podium at the World Championships, after the United States in 1991. On May 1, it was announced that Trusova was returning to the Sambo-70 training center under previous coach Tutberidze.

=== 2021–2022 season: Olympic silver medal ===
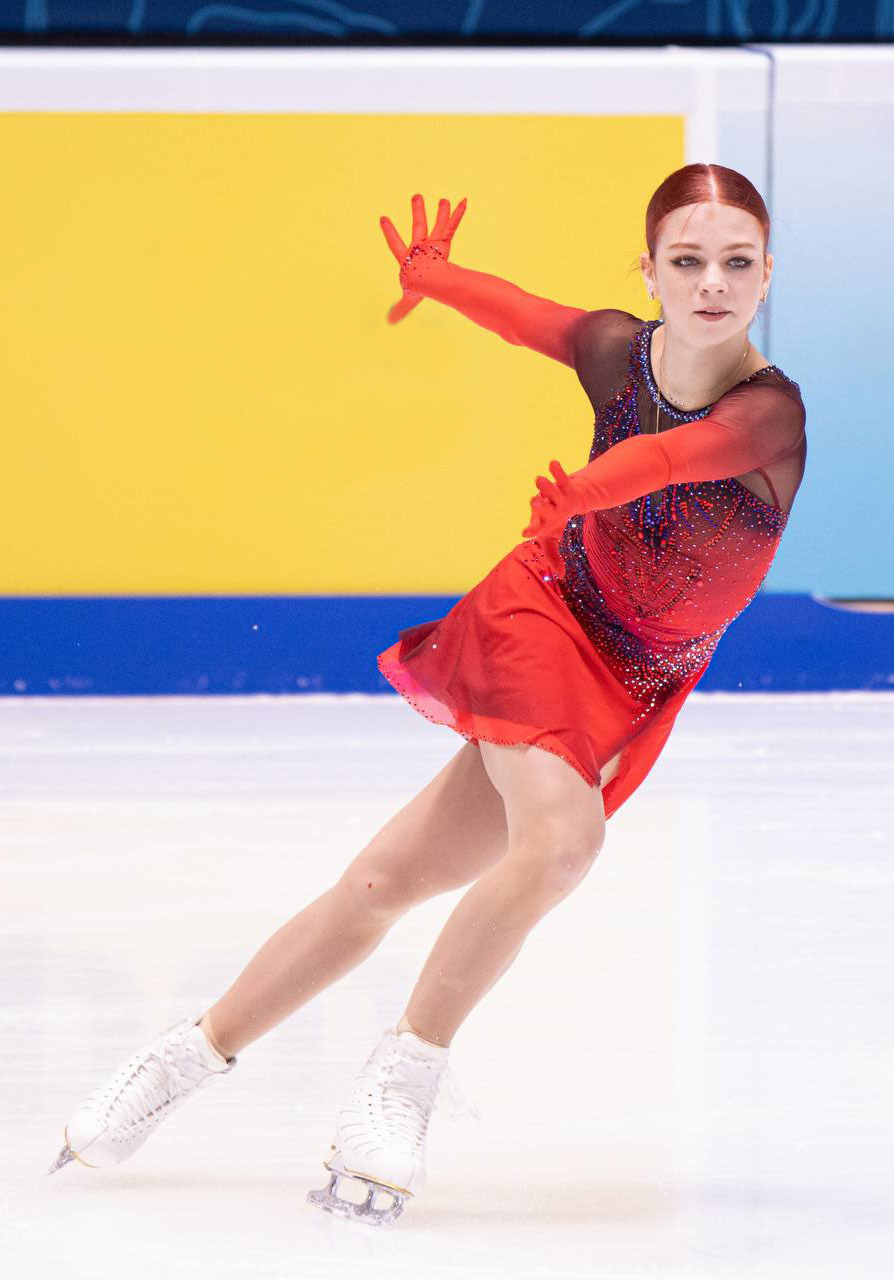
Trusova performing her short program at the 2022 Russian Figure Skating Championships

Trusova picked music from the American film Cruella for her free program, having watched it three times beforehand and persuading her coaches. She debuted her programs for the Olympic season at the 2021 Russian Test skates in September held in Chelyabinsk, where she cleanly executed a five-quad free program for the first time in a public event. However, she said afterward, "this is not a competition, so I'm not completely satisfied". The following week, Trusova competed at the 2021 U.S. Classic at the Skating Club of Boston, where she made mistakes on four out of five planned quads but narrowly took the gold medal over South Korean skater Park Yeon-jeong. In late October, it was reported that Trusova had suffered a leg injury shortly before the 2021 Skate America, which did not allow her to train at her maximum. Despite the injury, Trusova decided to compete and placed first in the short program with a personal best of 77.69 and won the free skate by opening with a quad Lutz. In early November, Trusova decided to withdraw from her second Grand Prix assignment, the 2021 NHK Trophy.

Returning to competition at the 2022 Russian Championships, Trusova placed fifth in the short program after botching her triple axel attempt. She rallied in the free skate despite two jump errors, placing second in the segment and winning the silver medal behind Kamila Valieva. Speaking afterward, she noted "the quad toe did not work" but was "still happy with the result". On 13 January 2023, Valieva was stripped of her gold medal for doping (trimetazidine) and Trusova was elevated to gold. At the European Championships in Tallinn, Trusova placed third in the short program despite falling on her triple axel attempt again. She landed two out of her four planned quads in the free skate, winning her second European bronze medal. Despite medalling, she said she was "not happy with the skate" due to the errors. On January 20, Trusova was officially named to the Russian Olympic team.

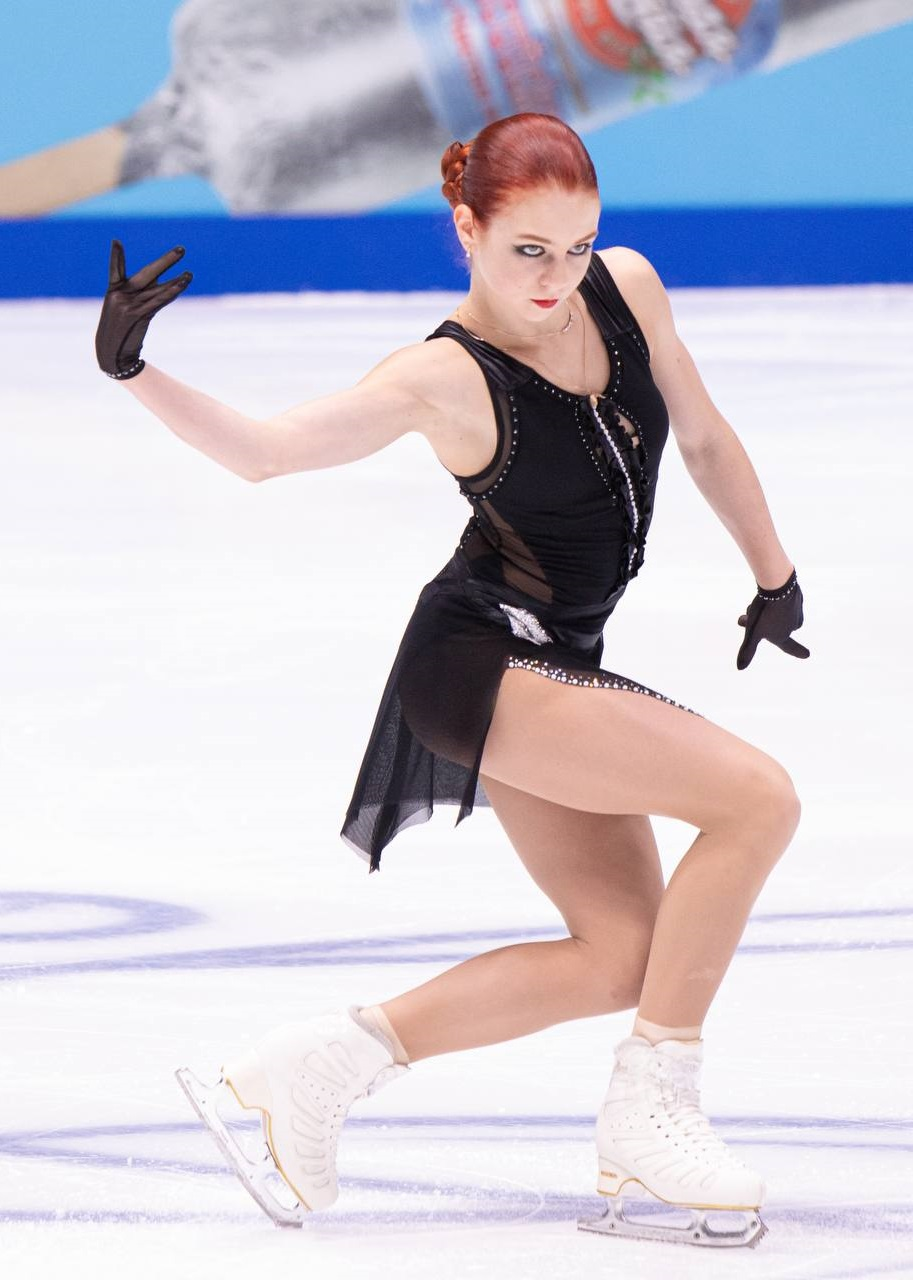
Trusova skating her free program at 2022 Russian Nationals

Competing in the women's event short program at the 2022 Winter Olympics, Trusova fell on an under rotated triple axel attempt and received an edge call on her triple flip but still placed fourth in the segment, 5.24 points behind third-place Kaori Sakamoto. In the free program, Trusova landed all five of the quads planned in her program, albeit receiving an edge call on her quad flip and negative grade of execution on her quad toe-loop and final solo quad Lutz. She placed first in the segment, setting Olympic scoring records of 106.16 for the technical component and 177.13 overall. However, she placed second overall behind teammate Shcherbakova, winning a silver medal in the event. Trusova became the first woman to land a quad flip and land a quad Lutz at the Olympics, the first woman to land four and five quads in competition, as well as the first woman to land four and five quads in one program at the Olympics.

After the results were announced, Trusova appeared visibly upset and was filmed crying and arguing with members of her coaching team. She reportedly said, "Everyone has a gold medal, everyone, but not me," and declared that she hated figure skating, adding that she would never skate again. She initially refused to participate in the flower ceremony but ultimately did attend. At the subsequent press conference, Trusova stated that she had expected her five-quad performance to secure the gold medal. She further explained that her emotional reaction was partly due to having spent three weeks away from her mother and dogs.

In a November 2023 interview, coach Eteri Tutberidze alleged that Trusova had pushed and shoved her after the Olympic results were announced, and had later thrown her skates at Tutberidze in the dressing room, which Tutberidze said she had to dodge.

In an October 2026 interview for the documentary series The Tutberidze Method, Trusova said she had rewatched her Olympic free skate many times and had soon become able to watch it calmly. She described the performance as the peak of her career.

In early March 2022, the ISU banned all figure skaters and officials from Russia and Belarus from attending the World Championships due to the Russia's full-scale invasion of Ukraine in late February, as a result of which Trusova was not allowed to participate in the competition at the end of March.

=== 2022–2023 season ===
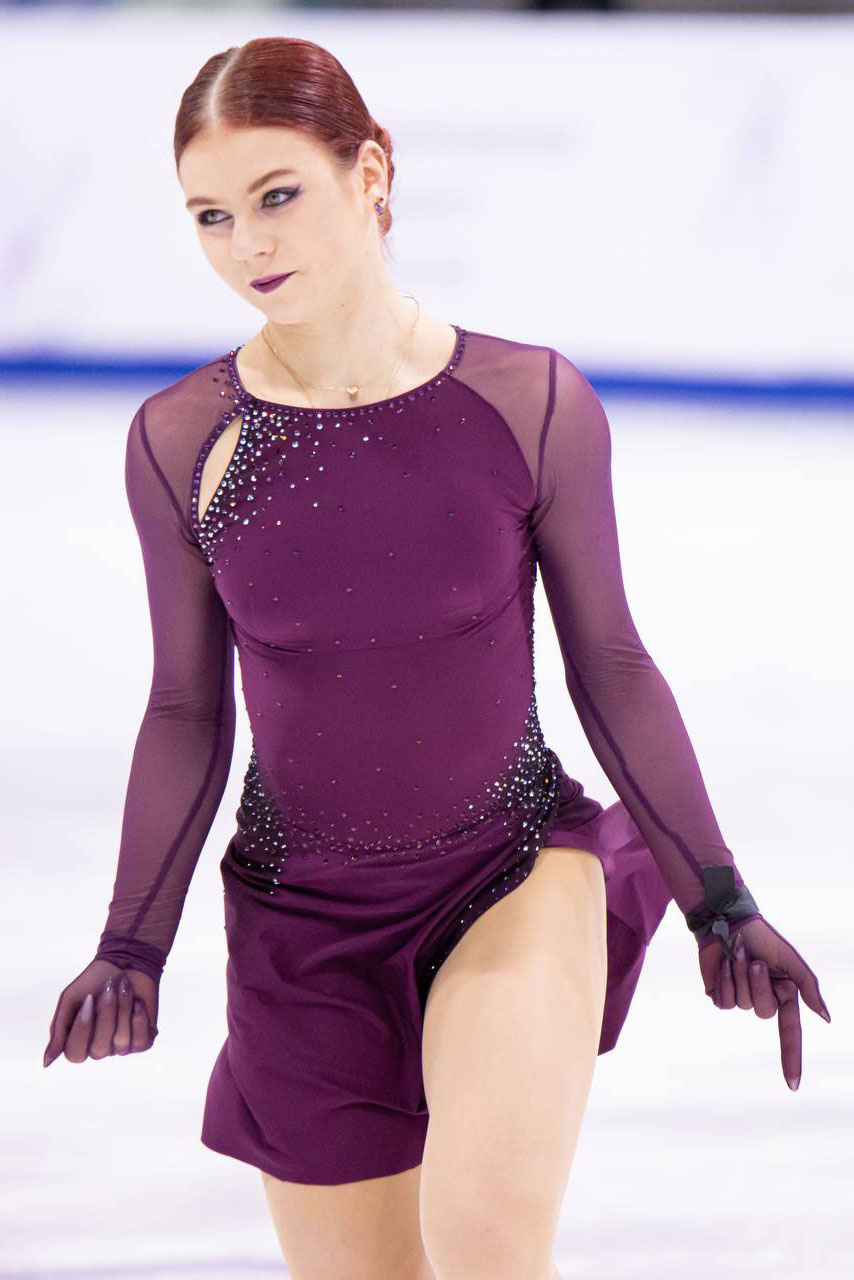
Trusova skating her short program (2022)

Trusova opened her fourth senior season at the September 2022 Russian test skate event held in Moscow. She skated the short program segment, debuting a new program to Annie Lennox's cover of "I Put a Spell on You" by Jay Hawkins, but withdrew from the free skate due to an ongoing back injury.

On 1 October, it was reported by TASS that Trusova had again decided to part ways with coaches Eteri Tutberidze, Daniil Gleikhengauz, and Sergei Dudakov, this time in favor of joining Svetlana Sokolovskaya's group at CSKA.

As Russia remained banned from international competition during the 2022-2023 season, Trusova opted to compete on the Russian Grand Prix Series (a series of all-Russian competitions in the same format as the international Grand Prix series). Trusova was assigned to the second and fifth stages of the series.

At the second stage of the Russian Grand Prix Series, Trusova debuted two new programs. She ranked second in the short program behind Adeliia Petrosian. In the free skate she attempted one quad Lutz, but fell on the attempt, ranking third in the free skate and third overall behind Petrosian and Sofia Samodelkina.

At the fifth stage of the Russian Grand Prix held in Samara, Trusova ranked third in the short program after downgrading what was intended to be a double axel. In the free skate she again attempted one quad Lutz, though it was unsuccessful. She ranked second in the free skate segment and second overall.

Trusova withdrew from both the 2023 Russian Championships and the 2023 Russian Grand Prix Final.

=== 2024–2025 season ===
It was announced that Trusova, now Ignatova, would partake in the 2024 Russian test skates, and that she had returned to training with Plushenko at his skating academy, Angels of Plushenko.

Trusova debuted two new programs at the 2024 Russian Test Skates, both of which were choreographed by Nikita Mikhailov. Her short program was set to the J2 and Ilza version of the song "Bésame Mucho". She cleanly landed a double axel and a triple flip, but struggled on the third jumping pass, doubling out of the second half of the intended triple-triple combination. In the free skate, Ignatova attempted one quad Lutz though the attempt was unsuccessful. She again struggled with her triple Lutz-triple toeloop combination, making similar errors to the short program. Speaking to press after her free skate, Ignatova said, "The performance was bad, definitely, but better than in training, it was really bad in training. But before going to Novogorsk I didn't make any mistakes in the short. These are trial runs for me, I haven't decided yet whether I'll come back."

It was announced in October 2024 that Ignatova would not make a comeback in the upcoming competitive season. An article written by RIA Novosti explained that although Ignatova would continue to train at the Angels of Plushenko, she did not intend to skate competitively during the 2024–2025 season.

Ignatova performing at an ice show in Kazan

=== 2025–2026 season: Return to competitive ice ===
On 19 January 2026, five months after giving birth to her son, Ignatova was listed as a participant alongside previous training mate Valieva, for the Russian Jumping Championship in February. The following day, Ignatova announced she had returned to training with Tutberidze. She shared in a YouTube video, "I decided to go to Eteri Georgievna because I trained with her for most of my career and it's more comfortable to practice and perform with her." She continues to say, "I want to comeback. I want to make my dream come true. Let's not say which one it is."

Ignatova participated in the Russian Jumping Championship. In the women's quarter-finals she finished in ninth place, unable to advance to the semi-finals. In the duets category she was paired with her husband Makar Ignatov; the pair finished in fifth place overall.

=== 2026–2027 season ===
During the off season, Ignatova collaborated with Benoît Richaud to create a new short program for the upcoming 2026–27 season.

On 30 June 2026, the International Skating Union announced that figure skaters from Russia and Belarus would be allowed to compete at international competitions as Individual Neutral Athletes (AINs). Each of these skaters are required to undergo an individual assessment conducted by the ISU Council to determine whether they meet the criteria for neutral status. Ignatova's application was approved, making her eligible to compete internationally as a neutral athlete.

Ignatova made her official return to international competition at the 2026 Kinoshita Group Cup. She placed fourth in the short program and second in the free skate, concluding the event in second place overall behind Japan's Mao Shimada. In the free skate, Ignatova landed her signature quadruple Lutz jump, making her the oldest women's skater to land a ratified quadruple jump at the age of 22. Subsequently, Ignatova competed at the 2026 CS Denis Ten Memorial Challenge where she won the title more than 15 points above Yujae Kim of Korea and Sofia Samodelkina of Kazakhstan. Her gold medal win named her to the top of the Grand Prix alternate list, and she was later assigned to the Cup of China and Skate America following Chaeyeon Kim and Mariia Seniuk's withdrawals.

Ignatova returned to the Grand Prix series for the first time in five years in China; placing third in the short program and first in the free skate, she placed second overall and won the silver medal behind Mone Chiba. “I’m very satisfied with the result,” she said. “Although I was a little nervous, I’m happy that I’m in good condition. I don’t feel any pressure from my popularity, and I’m really grateful for all the support from my fans. For me, just like before, only first place is important, but I’m happy that my performances are becoming more consistent, and I hope I can keep it that way.”

The following week, Ignatova took silver at 2026 Skate America behind Ami Nakai. "My goal is to improve with every single competition, both in the technical and the component part," she said. "I, for my part, I do everything that depends on me to make sure that both scores are high. Between China and Skate America, there was not really much time to work and to improve something because it's only four days. The most important thing was to keep my shape and not to get too tired. Overall, I'm really pleased with how I competed these two events back-to-back."

== Skating technique ==
A jump combination of a quadruple toe loop, euler and triple salchow at the Rostelecom Cup

Trusova's skating technique is distinguished by her ability to compete with a significant repertoire of quad jumps unrivaled by other female competitors as of 2022. Such ability has made her especially competitive in her free skate performances due to the higher scoring of quad jumps in women's competition. The ISU currently does not allow quads in the women's short program, leading Trusova to rely on the execution of her quads exclusively during her free skate programs. At the 2021 World Championships, she had planned five quad jumps in her free skate, managing to land three of them successfully and moving her from twelfth place after the short program to the bronze medal following her free skate.

At the 2018 JGP Lithuania, Trusova became the first female skater to land a quadruple jump in combination: a quad toe loop with a triple toe loop. A few weeks later, she was the first female skater to land a quadruple Lutz jump in international competition, ratified at the 2018 JGP Armenia. Trusova is the first and currently only female skater competing with four different types of quadruple jumps—toe loop, salchow, flip, and Lutz.

In May 2022, Trusova spoke in an interview of her desire to train to be the first person to do a quintuple jump in competition. When asked about the training, she stated that in 2021 she did train the quintuple jump using the 'fishing pole' harness apparatus used in Russia. She currently prefers to attempt the jumps without using any harnesses, which she describes as awkward and creating impediments to improving her ability to master the new jump. In the interview, Trusova stated that the quintuple jump might be approached as a priority over her trying the quad Axel (which men have already tried in competition) because she has not yet mastered the triple Axel for use in competition.

== Business and industry endorsements ==
Trusova has represented Adidas as a brand ambassador since 2018. She has appeared in numerous digital advertisements for the brand, including a 30-second advertisement for their "Impossible is Nothing" campaign in April 2021. She became a brand ambassador for the Japanese-produced Ajinomoto product Amino Vital in July 2020. In January 2021, Swiss luxury watch brand Maurice Lacroix announced Trusova as the latest Friend of the Brand to join their ML Crew. Trusova also became a spokesperson for the Russian-Belarusian brand of dairy products Verkhovye. She partnered with Canadian jewelry brand Brilliance & Melrose in October 2021. Trusova formerly used nude Risport Royal Pro boots, but as of late 2021 uses white Edea Piano boots with the same Jackson Ultima Matrix Supreme blades.

== Programs ==
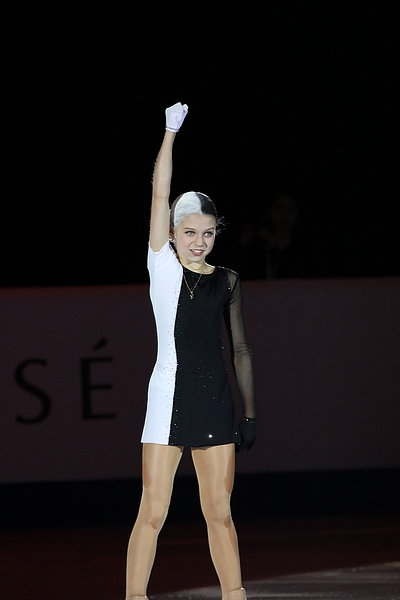
Trusova performing her exhibition at the 2019 World Junior Championships

Competition and exhibition programs by season
Season	Short program	Free skate program	Exhibition program
2014–15	"Mexican Hat Dance": Performed by Cincinnati Pops Orchestra	"Pan's Lullaby": From Pan's Labyrinth; Composed by Javier Navarrete	—N/a
2015–16	"Paint It Black": By The Rolling Stones; Performed by Vanessa Carlton	Lindsey Stirling Medley: Performed by Lindsey Stirling; Tracks used: 1. Crystallize; 2. My Immortal; 3. Spontaneous Me	—N/a
2016–17	"Your Heart Is As Black As Night: By Melody Gardot	Galicia Flamenca: By Gino D'Auri	—N/a
2017–18	"Big Spender": 1. "Big Spender"; From Sweet Charity; Performed by Peggy Lee; 2. "Jumpin' Jack"; Performed by Big Bad Voodoo Daddy; Choreo. by Daniil Gleikhengauz	The Four Seasons: Summer: Composed by Antonio Vivaldi; Arranged by Max Richter; Choreo. by Daniil Gleikhengauz	"Your Heart Is As Black As Night"
2018–19	Kill Bill Vol. 1: 1. "Bang Bang (My Baby Shot Me Down)"; Performed by Nancy Sinatra; 2. "Battle Without Honor or Humanity" (バトル･ウィズアウト･オナー・オア・ヒューマニティー); Composed by Tomoyasu Hotei; Choreo. by Daniil Gleikhengauz	The Fifth Element: 1. "Kill The Target"; 2. "Katana Groove"; Composed by Tomoyasu Hotei; 3. "Lucia di lammermoor" 4. "The Diva Dance"; Composed by Éric Serra; Choreo. by Daniil Gleikhengauz	"Unstoppable": By Sia
2018–19	Kill Bill Vol. 1: 1. "Bang Bang (My Baby Shot Me Down)"; Performed by Nancy Sinatra; 2. "Battle Without Honor or Humanity" (バトル･ウィズアウト･オナー・オア・ヒューマニティー); Composed by Tomoyasu Hotei; Choreo. by Daniil Gleikhengauz	The Fifth Element: 1. "Kill The Target"; 2. "Katana Groove"; Composed by Tomoyasu Hotei; 3. "Lucia di lammermoor" 4. "The Diva Dance"; Composed by Éric Serra; Choreo. by Daniil Gleikhengauz	"Big Spender"
2019–20 =	Peer Gynt: Solveig's Song; In the Hall of the Mountain King; Composed by Edvard Grieg; Choreo. by Daniil Gleikhengauz	Game of Thrones: 1. Pray (High Valyrian) - For the Throne; Performed by Matt Bellamy; 2. The Night King; Composed by Ramin Djawadi; Choreo. by Daniil Gleikhengauz, Eteri Tutberidze	"Ständchen": Composed by Franz Schubert; Arranged by Franz Liszt; Performed by Khatia Buniatishvili
2019–20 =	Peer Gynt: Solveig's Song; In the Hall of the Mountain King; Composed by Edvard Grieg; Choreo. by Daniil Gleikhengauz	Game of Thrones: 1. Pray (High Valyrian) - For the Throne; Performed by Matt Bellamy; 2. The Night King; Composed by Ramin Djawadi; Choreo. by Daniil Gleikhengauz, Eteri Tutberidze	"Unstoppable"
2020–21	Medley: 1. Love Story; Composed by Francis Lai; Performed by Lola Astanova and Stjepan Hauser; 2. Appassionata; Composed by Rolf Løvland; Choreo. by Sergei Rozanov, Evgeni Plushenko	Romeo and Juliet: 1. "Oh Verona"; Composed by Craig Armstrong; 2. "Come, Gentle Night"; Composed by Abel Korzeniowski; 3. "Dance of the Knights"; Choreo. by Sergei Rozanov, Evgeni Plushenko	"Game of Survival": By Ruelle
2021–22	Frida: Composed by Elliot Goldenthal; Choreo. by Daniil Gleikhengauz; Tracks used: 1. Benediction and Dream; 2. Alcoba Azul; Performed by Lila Downs; 3. Solo Tú	Cruella: 1. "Call Me Cruella"; Performed by Florence + the Machine; 2. "The True Story of Cruella's Birth'"; Composed by Nicholas Britell; 3. "I Wanna Be Your Dog"; Performed by John McCrea; Choreo. by Daniil Gleikhengauz	Wonder Woman: 1. "Wonder Woman, a Call to Stand"; Composed by Tom Holkenborg; 2. "Song to the Siren"; Performed by Rose Betts; From Zack Snyder's Justice League; Choreo. by Daniil Gleikhengauz
2021–22	Frida: Composed by Elliot Goldenthal; Choreo. by Daniil Gleikhengauz; Tracks used: 1. Benediction and Dream; 2. Alcoba Azul; Performed by Lila Downs; 3. Solo Tú	Cruella: 1. "Call Me Cruella"; Performed by Florence + the Machine; 2. "The True Story of Cruella's Birth'"; Composed by Nicholas Britell; 3. "I Wanna Be Your Dog"; Performed by John McCrea; Choreo. by Daniil Gleikhengauz	"I Won't Leave Halfway" (Не Брошу На Полпути): From Мастер; Performed by Yolka; Choreo. by Daniil Gleikhengauz
2022–23	"Ainsi bas la vida": By Indila; Choreo. by Nikita Mikhailov	Medley: 1. "I Believe I Can Fly (Epic Trailer Version)"; Performed by J2 ft. Casey Hensley; 2. "When You Are High"; Performed by enryoki; Choreo. by Nikita Mikhailov	"Fly": By Anton Belyaev
2022–23	"I Put a Spell on You": By Screamin' Jay Hawkins; Performed by Annie Lennox; Choreo. by Daniil Gleikhengauz	Medley: I Believe I Can Fly (Epic Trailer Version); When You Are High	Rhapsody on a Theme of Paganini: Composed by Sergei Rachmaninoff; Performed by Vladimir Ashkenazy; Choreo. by Sergei Filin
2023–24	—N/a	—N/a	"The Cuckoo": Composed by Viktor Tsoi; Performed by Polina Gagarina
2023–24	—N/a	—N/a	Rhapsody on a Theme of Paganini
2024–25	"Bésame Mucho": Composed by Consuelo Velázquez; Performed by J2 and Ilza; Choreo. by Nikita Mikhailov	Medley: 1. "Balder"; By Power-Haus, Christian Reindl, and Lucie Paradis; 2. "They Beat Us, We Fly"; By Jahan Polliyeva, Andrei Ktitarev, and Alla Pugacheva; Performed by Anastasiya Spiridonova; Choreo. by Nikita Mikhailov	—N/a
2026–27	"Lara": From Lara; By Arash Safaian ft. Alice Sara Ott; Choreo. by Benoît Richaud	"Running Up That Hill": From Stranger Things; By Kate Bush; Choreo. by Daniil Gleikhengauz & Eteri Tutberidze	"Zombie": By The Cranberries; Performed by Damned Anthem; Choreo. by Daniil Gleikhengauz
2026–27	"Lara": From Lara; By Arash Safaian ft. Alice Sara Ott; Choreo. by Benoît Richaud	"Running Up That Hill": From Stranger Things; By Kate Bush; Choreo. by Daniil Gleikhengauz & Eteri Tutberidze	"Всё на своих местах (Everything In Its Place)": By Mari Kraimbrery; Choreo. by Daniil Gleikhengauz

== Records and achievements ==
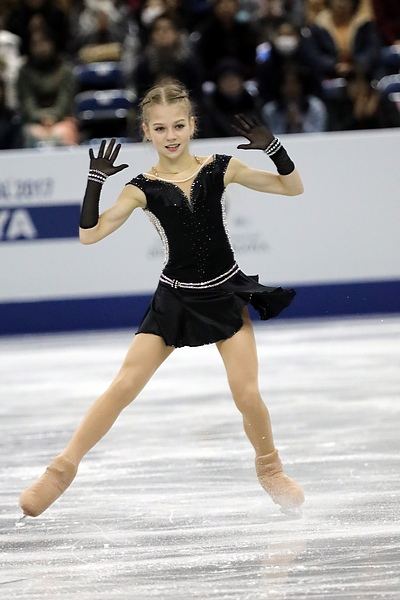
Trusova at the 2017–18 JGP Final

- At 13 years old, born on June 23, she is the youngest woman to win at the Junior World Championships and Junior Grand Prix Final, a distinction previously held by then 13-year-old Yulia Lipnitskaya, who was born on June 5.
- First woman to land a quad Lutz (Lz) jump in international competition.
- First woman to land a quad in combination (the quad toe loop + triple toe loop).
- First woman to land a quad toe loop (T).
- First woman to land two quads in the free skate.
- First woman to land two different types of quads.
- First woman to land three different triple jumping pass combinations in the free skate with the second jump ending in a triple salchow (S), triple loop, and triple toe loop (T).
- Second woman to land a clean quad salchow behind Miki Ando.
- She became the first woman to ever land three quads in an ISU sanctioned international competition when she landed 4Lz, 4T+3T and 4T at the 2019 CS Ondrej Nepela Memorial.
- She set the new free skating record of 163.78 points and also the new combined total record of 238.69 points. Her technical element score (TES) of 98.34 points in free skating was also the new world record at the 2019 CS Ondrej Nepela Memorial.
- She earned 14.72 points for her quadruple Lutz, which was the new record for the highest valued single jump at the 2019 CS Ondrej Nepela Memorial.
- She became the first woman to land four quads, and also the first woman to land three different quads, when she landed 4S, 4Lz, 4T+3T, and a 4T+1Eu+3S in the free skate at the 2019 Japan Open.
- She also became the first woman to land two quad jumps and a triple jump combination in one program at the 2019 Japan Open.
- She became the first woman to land a quad jump and a triple jump combination in the second half of the free skate at the 2019 Japan Open.
- She became the first woman ever to land two quad jumps and a triple jump combination in one program in ISU sanctioned international competition when she jumped 4T+3T and 4T+1Eu+3S at the 2019 Skate Canada.
- She became the first woman to land a quad jump and a triple jump combination in the second half of the free skate at the 2019 Skate Canada.
- She set the new free skating record of 166.62 points and also the new combined total record of 241.02 points. Her technical element score (TES) of 100.20 points in free skating was also the new world record at the 2019 Skate Canada.
- She became the first woman to attempt five quads in her free skate at the 2019–20 Grand Prix of Figure Skating Final.
- She became the first woman to land a quad flip (F) in a competition at the 2019–20 Grand Prix of Figure Skating Final.
- She held a technical score of 92.35 points in the free skate, the highest ever recorded in women's figure skating on both the junior and senior level until the GOE system was changed.
- She set a new record for the highest valued single jump when she scored a 15.71 on her quad flip European championships 2022.
- She became the first woman ever to land four and five quads in competition when she landed 4F, 4S, 4T, 4Lz+3T, and 4Lz at the Winter Olympics 2022. She is also currently the only woman to even attempt 4 and 5 quads due to her ability to land a variety of them.
- First and currently, the only woman to land three and four different types of quads, which she accomplished at the Winter Olympics 2022.
- First skater (among both men and women) to land a 4Lz+3T combination in the second half of free skating, which she accomplished at the Winter Olympics 2022. Scoring 19.90 (BV 17.27 + GOE 2.63), she also set the new record of highest valued combination jump by a woman.
- Oldest skater to land a ratified quad jump, first achieved at the Kinoshita Group Cup with a 4Lz
- First postpartum skater to land a ratified quad, achieved at the Kinoshita Group Cup with a 4Lz

=== Senior world record scores ===
Trusova has set four world record scores.

Women's combined total
Date	Score	Event	Note
26 October 2019	241.02	2019 Skate Canada	This record was later broken by Aliona Kostornaia at the 2019–20 Grand Prix Final
21 September 2019	238.69	2019 CS Nepela Memorial	She broke the previous record held by Alina Zagitova by 0.26 points.
Women's free skating
Date	Score	Event	Note
26 October 2019	166.62	2019 Skate Canada	She became the first woman ever to achieve a technical element score (TES) above 100 points (100.20 points). Broken by Kamila Valieva at the 2021 CS Finlandia Trophy.
21 September 2019	163.78	2019 CS Nepela Memorial	She broke the previous record held by Alina Zagitova by about 5 points.

=== Junior world record scores ===
Trusova has set six junior world record scores under the new +5/-5 GOE (Grade of Execution) system.

Junior women's combined total
Date	Score	Event	Note
9 March 2019	222.89	2019 World Junior Championships	Broken by Kamila Valieva the following year.
7 September 2018	221.44	2018 JGP Lithuania	She broke the previous record held by Anna Shcherbakova by more than 16 points.
Junior women's free skating
Date	Score	Event	Note
9 March 2019	150.40	2019 World Junior Championships	Broken by Kamila Valieva the following year.
12 October 2018	146.81	2018 JGP Armenia	At this competition, Trusova became the first woman to land a 4Lz jump.
7 September 2018	146.70	2018 JGP Lithuania	She broke the previous record held by Alena Kostornaia by more than 14 points. Trusova became the first woman to 4T+3T combo at this competition.
Junior women's short program
Date	Score	Event	Note
6 September 2018	74.74	2018 JGP Lithuania	She broke the previous record held by Anna Shcherbakova by about 1.6 points.

=== Historical junior world record scores ===
Trusova had set three junior world record scores before season 2018–19. However, because of the introduction of the new +5/-5 GOE (Grade of Execution) system to replace the previous +3/-3 GOE system, the ISU decided that all statistics would start from zero from the 2018–19 onward and that all previous statistics would be historical.

Junior women's combined total
Date	Score	Event	Note
10 March 2018	225.52	2018 World Junior Championships	Standing junior world record score until the GOE system was changed on 1 July 2018. Trusova became the first junior woman to score above 210 points and 220 points. She broke the previous record held by Alina Zagitova by about 17 points.
Junior women's short program
Date	Score	Event	Note
7 December 2017	73.25	2017–18 Junior Grand Prix Final	Standing junior world record score until the GOE system was changed on 1 July 2018. Trusova broke the previous record set by Alena Kostornaia, which was skated only ten minutes earlier.
Junior women's free skating
Date	Score	Event	Note
10 March 2018	153.49	2018 World Junior Championships	Standing junior world record score until the GOE system was changed on 1 July 2018. Trusova became the first junior woman to score above 140 points and 150 points in free skating. She broke the previous record held by Alina Zagitova by more than 15 points.

== Competitive highlights ==
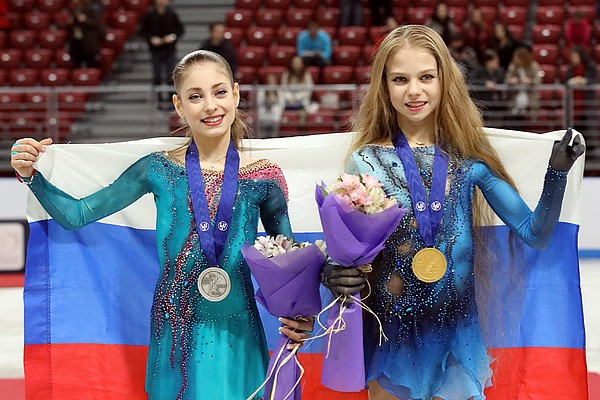
Trusova (right) with Alena Kostornaia (left) at the 2018 World Junior Championships

- GP – Event of the ISU Grand Prix Series
- JGP – Event of the ISU Junior Grand Prix Series
- CS – Event of the ISU Challenger Series
- C – Event was cancelled
- TBD – Assigned
- WD – Withdrew from competition

=== Skating as an Individual Neutral Athlete ===
Competition placements at senior level
Season	2026–27
Grand Prix Final	TBD
GP Skate America	2nd
GP Cup of China	2nd
CS Kinoshita Group Cup	2nd
CS Denis Ten Memorial	1st

=== Skating for Russia ===
Competition placements at senior level
Season	2018–19	2019–20	2020–21	2021–22	2022–23
Winter Olympics				2nd	
World Championships		C	3rd		
European Championships		3rd	C	2nd	
Grand Prix Final		3rd			
Russian Championships	2nd	3rd	3rd	1st	
Russian GP Stage 1 (Note: In 2022, the Russian Cup Stages were renamed to Russian Grand Prix Stages.)				WD	
Russian GP Stage 2			1st		3rd
Russian GP Stage 4	1st		1st		
Russian GP Stage 5					2nd
GP Rostelecom Cup		1st	4th		
GP Skate America				1st	
GP Skate Canada		1st			
CS Nepela Memorial		1st			
CS U.S. Classic				1st	
Japan Open		1st (1st)			

Competition placements at junior level
Season	2016–17	2017–18	2018–19
World Junior Championships		1st	1st
Junior Grand Prix Final		1st	2nd
Russian Championships	4th	1st	1st
Russian Cup Final	3rd	2nd	
Russian Cup Stage 2	3rd		
Russian Cup Stage 3		1st	
Russian Cup Stage 5	2nd	2nd	
JGP Armenia			1st
JGP Australia		1st	
JGP Belarus		1st	
JGP Lithuania			1st

== Detailed results ==
ISU personal best scores in the +5/-5 GOE System
Segment	Type	Score	Event
Total	TSS	251.73	2022 Winter Olympics
Short program	TSS	77.69	2021 Skate America
Short program	TES	44.18	2018 JGP Armenia
Short program	PCS	35.48	2022 Winter Olympics
Free skating	TSS	177.13	2022 Winter Olympics
Free skating	TES	106.16	2022 Winter Olympics
Free skating	PCS	70.97	2022 Winter Olympics

ISU personal best scores in the +3/-3 GOE System
Segment	Type	Score	Event
Total	TSS	225.52	2018 World Junior Championships
Short program	TSS	73.25	2017—18 Junior Grand Prix Final
Short program	TES	42.96	2017—18 Junior Grand Prix Final
Short program	PCS	30.29	2017—18 Junior Grand Prix Final
Free skating	TSS	153.49	2018 World Junior Championships
Free skating	TES	92.35	2018 World Junior Championships
Free skating	PCS	61.14	2018 World Junior Championships

=== Senior level ===
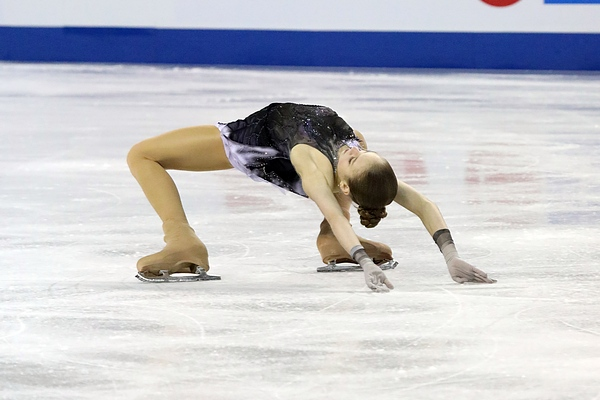
Trusova executing a cantilever at the 2019 Skate Canada International

- Small medals for the short program and free skating are only awarded at ISU Championships.
- Medals at team events are awarded for the team results only. Individual placements at team events are listed in parentheses.

=== Skating as an Individual Neutral Athlete ===
Results in the 2026–27 season
Date	Event	SP		FS		Total	
Date	Event	P	Score	P	Score	P	Score
4–6 Sept, 2026	(Japan) 2026 CS Kinoshita Group Cup	4	74.92	2	146.14	2	221.06
8–11 Oct, 2026	(Kazakhstan) 2026 CS Denis Ten Memorial Challenge	1	77.39	1	148.62	1	226.01
6–8 Nov, 2026	2026 Cup of China	3	72.37	1	148.90	2	221.27
13–15 Nov, 2026	(United States) 2026 Skate America	2	74.24	3	139.66	2	213.90
10-12 Dec 2026	(China) 2026–27 Grand Prix of Figure Skating Final						

=== Skating for Russia ===
Results in the 2018–19 season
Date	Event	SP		FS		Total	
Date	Event	P	Score	P	Score	P	Score
6–10 Nov 2018	(Russia) 2018 Russian Cup Stage IV, Kazan	2	74.53	1	157.71	1	232.24
19–23 Dec 2018	(Russia) 2019 Russian Championships	2	74.96	2	154.75	2	229.71

Results in the 2019–20 season
Date	Event	SP		FS		Total	
Date	Event	P	Score	P	Score	P	Score
19–21 Sep 2019	(Slovakia) 2019 CS Nepela Memorial	1	74.91	1	163.78	1	238.69
5 Oct 2019	2021 Japan Open	—N/a	—N/a	1	160.53	1	—N/a
25–27 Oct 2019	2019 Skate Canada International	3	74.40	1	166.62	1	241.02
15–17 Nov 2019	(Russia) 2019 Rostelecom Cup	2	74.21	1	160.26	1	234.47
5–8 Dec 2019	(Italy) 2019–20 Grand Prix Final	5	71.45	3	161.73	3	233.18
24–29 Dec 2019	(Russia) 2020 Russian Championships	3	76.46	3	149.88	3	226.34
20–26 Jan 2020	(Austria) 2020 European Championships	3	74.95	3	150.39	3	225.34

Results in the 2020–21 season
Date	Event	SP		FS		Total	
Date	Event	P	Score	P	Score	P	Score
10–13 Oct 2020	(Russia) 2020 Russian Cup Stage II, Moscow	3	75.77	1	164.82	1	240.59
8–12 Nov 2020	(Russia) 2020 Russian Cup Stage IV, Kazan	2	77.42	1	171.21	1	248.63
20–22 Nov 2020	(Russia) 2020 Rostelecom Cup	3	70.81	4	128.12	4	198.93
23–27 Dec 2020	(Russia) 2021 Russian Championships	4	75.76	3	170.61	3	246.37
22–28 Mar 2021	(Sweden) 2021 World Championships	12	64.82	1	152.38	3	217.20

Results in the 2021–22 season
Date	Event	SP		FS		Total	
Date	Event	P	Score	P	Score	P	Score
15–18 Sep 2021	(United States) 2021 U.S. Classic	1	74.75	1	142.05	1	216.80
22–26 Sep 2021	(Russia) 2021 Russian Cup Stage I, Sysran	1	74.53	WD	—N/a	WD	—N/a
22–24 Oct 2021	(United States) 2021 Skate America	1	77.69	1	154.68	1	232.37
22–24 Dec 2021	(Russia) 2022 Russian Championships	5	74.21	2	174.44	1	248.65
10–16 Jan 2022	(Estonia) 2022 European Championships	3	75.13	3	159.23	2	234.36
15–17 Feb 2022	(China) 2022 Winter Olympics	4	74.60	1	177.13	2	251.73

Results in the 2022–23 season
Date	Event	SP		FS		Total	
Date	Event	P	Score	P	Score	P	Score
28–30 Oct 2022	(Russia) 2022 Russian Grand Prix II, Sochi	2	70.20	3	138.35	3	208.55
18–21 Nov 2022	(Russia) 2023 Russian Grand Prix V, Samara	3	69.50	2	144.30	2	213.80

=== Junior level ===
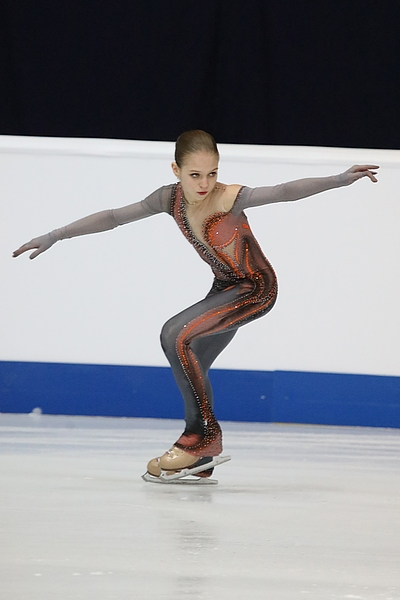
Trusova at the 2019 World Junior Championships

- Small medals for the short program and free skating are only awarded at ISU Championships.

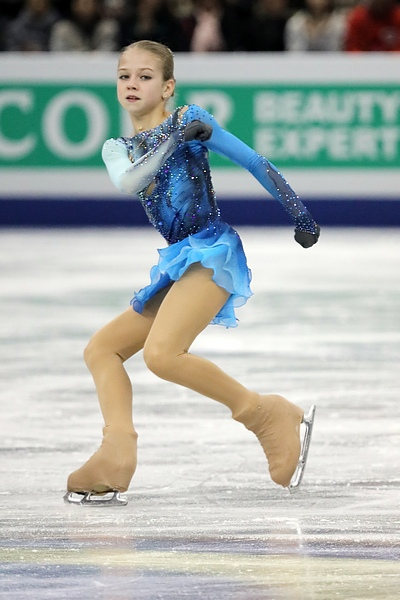
Trusova at the 2017–18 JGP Final

Results in the 2016–17 season
Date	Event	SP		FS		Total	
Date	Event	P	Score	P	Score	P	Score
11–15 Oct 2016	(Russia) 2016 Russian Cup Stage II, Yoshkar-Ola	3	61.86	3	122.68	3	184.54
2–6 Dec 2016	(Russia) 2016 Russian Cup Stage V, Moscow	1	63.66	2	122.58	2	186.24
1–5 Feb 2017	(Russia) 2017 Russian Junior Championships	6	64.95	4	129.65	4	194.60
13–17 Feb 2017	(Russia) 2017 Russian Grand Prix Final	6	65.14	3	125.75	3	190.89

Results in the 2017–18 season
Date	Event	SP		FS		Total	
Date	Event	P	Score	P	Score	P	Score
Aug 23–26, 2017	2017 JGP Australia	1	65.57	1	132.12	1	197.69
Sep 20–24, 2017	2017 JGP Belarus	1	69.72	1	126.60	1	196.32
27–31 Oct 2017	(Russia) 2017 Russian Cup Stage III, Sochi	1	70.19	1	129.11	1	199.30
21–25 Nov 2017	(Russia) 2017 Russian Cup Stage V, Moscow	2	69.13	1	135.57	2	204.70
7–10 Dec 2017	(Japan) 2017–18 Junior Grand Prix Final	1	73.25	2	132.36	1	205.61
23–26 Jan 2018	(Russia) 2018 Russian Junior Championships	1	74.25	3	137.84	1	205.61
19–23 Feb 2018	(Russia) 2018 Russian Cup Final	6	65.78	1	143.14	2	208.92
5–11 Mar 2018	(Bulgaria) 2018 World Junior Championships	1	72.03	1	153.49	1	225.52

Results in the 2018–19 season
Date	Event	SP		FS		Total	
Date	Event	P	Score	P	Score	P	Score
5–8 Sep 2018	2018 JGP Lithuania	1	74.74	1	146.70	1	221.44
10–13 Oct 2018	2018 JGP Armenia	1	74.19	1	146.81	1	221.00
6–9 Dec 2018	(Canada) 2018–19 Junior Grand Prix Final	2	74.43	2	140.77	2	215.20
31 Jan – 4 Feb 2019	(Russia) 2019 Russian Junior Championships	7	69.55	1	164.44	1	233.99
4–10 Mar 2019	(Croatia) 2019 World Junior Championships	2	72.49	1	150.40	1	222.89

== Notes ==
World Record Holders
Preceded by (Russia) Anna Shcherbakova	Women's Short Program; 6 September 2018 – 27 September 2018	Succeeded by (Russia) Alina Zagitova
Preceded by (Russia) Alena Kostornaia (Russia) Alina Zagitova	Women's Free Skating; 7 September 2018 – 22 September 2018; 21 September 2019 – 10 October 2021	Succeeded by (Japan) Rika Kihira (Russia) Kamila Valieva
Preceded by (Russia) Anna Shcherbakova (Russia) Alina Zagitova	Women's Total Score; 7 September 2018 – 28 September 2018; 21 September 2019 – 7 December 2019	Succeeded by (Russia) Alina Zagitova (Russia) Alena Kostornaia
World Junior Record Holders
Preceded by (Russia) Anna Shcherbakova	Women's Junior Short Program; 6 September 2018 – 6 December 2018	Succeeded by (Russia) Alena Kostornaia
Preceded by (Russia) Alena Kostornaia	Women's Junior Free Skating; 7 September 2018 – 7 March 2020	Succeeded by (Russia) Kamila Valieva
Preceded by (Russia) Anna Shcherbakova	Women's Junior Total Score; 7 September 2018 – 7 March 2020	Succeeded by (Russia) Kamila Valieva
Historical World Junior Record Holders (before season 2018–19)
Preceded by (Russia) Alena Kostornaia	Women's Junior Short Program; 7 December 2017 – 1 July 2018	Succeeded by The GOE system was changed.
Preceded by (Russia) Alina Zagitova	Women's Junior Free Skating; 10 March 2018 – 1 July 2018	Succeeded by The GOE system was changed.
Preceded by (Russia) Alina Zagitova	Women's Junior Total Score; 10 March 2018 – 1 July 2018	Succeeded by The GOE system was changed.
