= Timur Alaskhanov =

Russian ice dancer

Personal information
- Native name: Тимур Зайндиевич Аласханов
- Full name: Timur Zayndiyevich Alaskhanov
- Born: 22 February 1979 (age 47) Moscow, Russian SFSR, Soviet Union
- Height: 1.81 m (5 ft 11 1/2 in)

Figure skating career
- Country: Russia
- Partner: Ekaterina Gvozdkova, Ksenia Chalova
- Coach: Natalia Dubova, Larisa Fedorinova
- Skating club: Profsoyuzy
- Began skating: 1984

Timur Zayndiyevich Alaskhanov (Russian: Тимур Зайндиевич Аласханов; born 22 February 1979) is a Russian former competitive ice dancer. With Ekaterina Gvozdkova, he competed at three Grand Prix events and at the 2001 Winter Universiade. In the 2001–02 season, Gvozdkova/Alaskhanov were coached by Larisa Fedorinova in Moscow. The following season, they trained under Natalia Dubova in Stamford, Connecticut.

== Programs ==
(with Gvozdkova)

| Season | Original dance | Free dance |
|---|---|---|
| 2002–03 | Waltz: Roses from the South; Polka: Thunder and Lightning by Johann Strauss II | Quixote by Bond; Victory; Winter by Yoad Nevo performed by Bond |
| 2001–02 | Paso doble; Tango | Carmina Burana by Carl Orff; The Messenger: The Story of Joan of Arc by Éric Serra |

== Competitive highlights ==
GP: Grand Prix

=== With Gvozdkova ===
International
| Event | 2000–01 | 2001–02 | 2002–03 |
|---|---|---|---|
| GP Cup of Russia | | 11th | 10th |
| GP NHK Trophy | | | 7th |
| Nebelhorn Trophy | | 6th | |
| Winter Universiade | 7th | | |
National
| Russian Championships | 5th | 5th | 4th |

=== With Chalova ===
National
| Event | 1999–2000 |
|---|---|
| Russian Championships | 6th |
