= Doug Mattis =

American figure skater (1966–2023)

Personal information
- Born: April 26, 1966
- Died: February 9, 2023 (aged 56)

Figure skating career
- Country: United States
- Coach: Robin Cousins; Frank Carroll
- Retired: 1991

Doug Mattis (April 26, 1966 – February 9, 2023) was an American figure skater. He was the 1985 Grand Prix International St. Gervais champion, 1985 Nebelhorn Trophy silver medalist, 1986 Novarat Trophy silver medalist, and 1985 U.S. national junior champion.

== Life and career ==
Mattis was born on April 26, 1966, in Philadelphia, Pennsylvania. He won the junior men's title at the 1985 U.S. Championships.

From 1986 to 1991, Mattis competed in the senior men's division at the U.S. Championships. He won three international medals — gold at the 1985 Grand Prix International St. Gervais in France, silver at the 1985 Nebelhorn Trophy in Germany, and silver at the 1986 Novarat Trophy in Hungary. He never included the triple Axel in competition, having a low success rate in practice, but did perform a one-footed back flip. In the later years of his Olympic-eligible career, he was coached by Robin Cousins and Frank Carroll. He received financial support from the Foundation for International Ice Skating Advancement. In the 1990–91 season, he also trained in pair skating; his partner was Liberte Sheldon and was coached by Irina Rodnina. During his long program at the U.S. Figure Skating Championships in 1991, Mattis protested what he thought was underscoring from the judges by executing a backflip, an illegal movement in national and international competitions. Despite landing 6 clean triple jumps in the program, the judges took significant deductions for the backflip, resulting in a 13th-place finish in his final eligible competition.

Mattis retired from amateur competition after the 1991 U.S. Championships. He then competed in professional events, including the U.S. Open Championships and World Professional Championships in Jaca, Spain. Mattis unsuccessfully tried to return to amateur skating after Rudy Galindo won the U.S Nationals title in 1996, citing Galindo as an inspiration that openly gay skaters could win competitions. He worked as a choreographer and coach. He supported the Young Artists Showcase at the American Ice Theater.

His programs included Hypnotized, Imitation, Nightmare/It's No Good, and Can't Cry Hard Enough.

As a writer, he published poems, essays and short stories and worked for Disney and Universal Studios.

Mattis was openly gay and performed an exhibition at the 1994 Gay Games in New York. He died on February 9, 2023, at the age of 56 in New York City. His life partner was clarinetist, Neil Rynston.

== Competitive highlights ==
International
Event	81–82	82–83	83–84	84–85	85–86	86–87	87–88	88–89	89–90	90–91
International St. Gervais					1st					
Nebelhorn Trophy					2nd					
Novarat Trophy						2nd				
Prize of Moscow News								4th		
National
U.S. Championships	6th N	8th J	3rd J	1st J	7th	10th	9th	9th	8th	13th
U.S. Olympic Festival					3rd					
Pacific Coast Sectional										4th
Eastern Sectional							1st			
Levels: N = Novice; J = Junior

=== Professional career ===
International
Event	1991	1994	1997	1998
U.S. Open Championships	5th	2nd	4th	
World Professional Championships (Jaca)				14th
