= Bérangère Nau =

French ice dancer

Personal information
- Born: 2 November 1976 (age 49) Angers, France
- Height: 1.55 m (5 ft 1 in)

Figure skating career
- Country: France

Bérangère Nau (born 2 November 1976) is a French former ice dancer. With partner Luc Monéger, she is the 1993 Penta Cup champion, 1993 Grand Prix International St. Gervais bronze medalist, 1993 World Junior bronze medalist, and 1994 French national bronze medalist. The duo represented France at the 1994 Winter Olympics, placing 14th.

== Results ==
With Moneger

International
Event	91–92	92–93	93–94	94–95
Winter Olympics			14th	
International de Paris			4th	
International St. Gervais			3rd	
Penta Cup			1st	
Skate Canada				9th
International: Junior
World Junior Champ.	9th	3rd		
National
French Championships			3rd	4th
