= Klára Engi =

Hungarian ice dancer (born 1967)

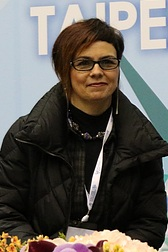

Personal information
- Full name: Klára Engi
- Born: November 1, 1967 (age 58) Budapest, Hungary

Figure skating career
- Country: Hungary
- Partner: Attila Tóth
- Retired: 1992

Klára Engi (born November 1, 1967) is a retired Hungarian ice dancer. She competed with Attila Tóth. Together, they placed 16th at the 1984 Winter Olympics, 7th at the 1988 Winter Olympics, and 7th at the 1992 Winter Olympics. Their highest placement at the World Figure Skating Championships was 4th, which they achieved in 1989. Their highest placement at the European Figure Skating Championships was 4th, which they achieved in 1989, 1990, and 1991.

Engi was born in Budapest. She works as a coach and choreographer. Her clients include Jacqueline Voll, Josip Gluhak, and Nathalie van Uffelen.

== Results ==
(ice dance with Attila Tóth)

International
Event	83–84	84–85	85–86	86–87	87–88	88–89	89–90	90–91	91–92
Olympics	16th				7th				7th
Worlds	18th	14th	11th	8th	7th	4th	WD	5th	
Europeans	17th	9th	6th	6th	6th	4th	4th	4th	5th
NHK Trophy				5th				2nd	
Skate America			4th						
Skate Canada		8th	5th						
Danse Grenoble					2nd	2nd	1st		
Danubius/Novarat			2nd	2nd	1st				
Prague Skate	7th								
St. Ivel			3rd						
National
Hungary		1st	1st	1st	1st	1st	1st	1st	1st
WD = Withdrew
