= Tracey Damigella =

American figure skater

Personal information
- Other names: Tracey Damigella-Lohse
- Born: c. 1969 (age 56–57)

Figure skating career
- Country: United States
- Partner: Doug Williams
- Coach: Carlo Fassi
- Retired: 1990s

Tracey Damigella-Lohse (born c. 1969) is an American former competitive figure skater. As a single skater, she is the 1985 Grand Prix International St. Gervais champion, 1987 Novarat Trophy champion, 1985 Nebelhorn Trophy silver medalist, and 1986 U.S. national pewter medalist.

== Personal life ==
Tracey Damigella was born c. 1969 and grew up in Miramar, Florida, the daughter of Marion and Frank Damigella. She was raised with three siblings – Gail, Robert, and Toni. Her sister, Toni, competed in women's singles luge at the 1984 Winter Olympics.

Damigella has a daughter, Sofia Goddard (born in 1999), with Scott Goddard, a marble granite contractor whom she married in April 1994 in Los Angeles. Now known as Damigella-Lohse, she resides in Cooper City, Florida.

== Career ==
Damigella began learning to skate at the Polar Palace in Miami, Florida. She represented the United States in ladies' singles for most of her career. In February 1985, she won the junior silver medal at the U.S. Championships, finishing second to Jill Trenary. Internationally, she won gold medals at the 1985 Grand Prix International St. Gervais champion and 1987 Novarat Trophy. She was awarded silver at the 1985 Nebelhorn Trophy and the pewter medal at the 1986 U.S. Championships. Based mainly at the Lighthouse Point Ice Skating Arena in Florida, she also took lessons from Carlo Fassi for five years at the Broadmoor World Arena in Colorado Springs, Colorado. Her skating expenses, nearly $50,000 a year, were covered mainly by her parents who sold a house in Boston and a motel in South Florida.

Damigella won the ladies' title at the Australian Championships in the 1989–90 season, but never appeared for Australia internationally. In the summer of 1991, she and Doug Williams began a pairs partnership, training in North Hollywood, California. The two represented the United States at the 1992 NHK Trophy and 1993 Nations Cup.

In NBC's 1994 made-for-TV movie Tonya and Nancy: The Inside Story, Damigella served as the skating double for Heather Langenkamp, who played Nancy Kerrigan. She has worked as a skating coach at the Sunrise Ice Skating Center and Pines Ice Arena in Pembroke Pines, Florida.

== Programs ==
Season	Short program	Free skating
1987–88	Embraceable You by George Gershwin	On the Waterfront by Leonard Bernstein
1986–87		Swan Lake by Pyotr Ilyich Tchaikovsky
1985–86		L'Arlésienne (Bizet), Suite No. 2: Farandole by Georges Bizet

== Competitive highlights ==
=== Pairs with Williams ===
International
Event	1991–92	1992–93	1993–94
Nations Cup			7th
NHK Trophy		6th	
National
U.S. Championships	12th	8th	12th

=== Ladies' singles ===
Event	84–85	85–86	86–87	87–88	88–89	89–90
Nebelhorn Trophy		2nd				
Novarat Trophy				1st		
Skate America			4th			
Skate Canada					5th	
St. Gervais		1st				
National
Australian Champ.						1st
U.S. Championships	2nd J	4th	7th	8th	9th	
