= Stéphane Yvars =

Personal information
- Born: c. 1970 (age 55–56)

Figure skating career
- Country: Canada
- Skating club: CPA Boucherville
- Retired: 1998

Stéphane Yvars (born c. 1970) is a Canadian former competitive figure skater. He is the 1997 Czech Skate champion and a three-time (1995–97) Quebec champion. He trained at CPA Boucherville and at the Mariposa School of Skating, where he was coached by Doug Leigh. He retired from competition due to a knee injury.

As of 2015, Yvars is the head coach at Boucherville Centre Elite. His brothers, Bruno and Thierry, also competed in figure skating.

== Competitive highlights ==
GP: Champions Series (Grand Prix)

International
Event	87–88	88–89	90–91	94–95	95–96	96–97	97–98
GP Skate America					7th		
Czech Skate							1st
Nebelhorn Trophy						6th	
Novarat Trophy		3rd					
Schäfer Memorial		6th					
Skate Electric; Inter. Challenge			4th				
Universiade		7th					
National
Canadian Champ.	2nd J			5th	6th	6th	WD
