= Larisa Filina =

Soviet ice dancer

Larisa Filina, nee Fedorinova (Russian: Лариса Владимировная Филина (Федоринова)) is a former Soviet ice dancer. Competing as Larisa Fedorinova with partner Evgeni Platov, she won the 1988 Karl Schäfer Memorial and finished sixth at the 1989 World Championships in Paris, France.

== Results ==
(as Fedorinova with Evgeni Platov)

International
Event	1986–87	1987–88	1988–89
World Championships			6th
International de Paris		4th	
Karl Schäfer Memorial			1st
Novarat Trophy	3rd		
Prize of Moscow News			2nd
National
Soviet Championships		4th	4th
