= White Box Tour =

2027 solo ice show tour in Japan

- Ice show type: Touring solo show
- Format: On-screen narration with live figure skating performances
- Theme: Skating performances as exhibits in an art museum
- Start date: January 9, 2027
- End date: February 7, 2027
- No. of shows: 5
- Country: Japan
- Venue: Pia Arena MM; Ecopa Arena
- Broadcast: TV Asahi
- Producer: Yuzuru Hanyu (performer)
- Director: Mikiko
- Organizer: Team Sirius; CIC; TV Asahi
- Sponsor: Phiten
- Website: whitebox.icestory.jp

Yuzuru Hanyu article series
- Skating career: Olympic seasons; Career achievements; Figure skating programs
- Other works: Bibliography
- Solo ice shows: Prologue; Gift; Repray Tour; Echoes of Life Tour; Realive; White Box Tour
- Ensemble ice shows: Fantasy on Ice; Continues with Wings; Yuzuru Hanyu Notte Stellata

The White Box Tour (full title stylized as 'Yuzuru Hanyu Ice Story 4th WHITE BOX') is an upcoming solo ice show by Japanese figure skater and two-time consecutive Olympic champion Yuzuru Hanyu in 2027, organized by his management company Team Sirius in partnership with CIC, and TV Asahi. The show is scheduled to be held at Pia Arena MM in Yokohama on January 9, 11, and 13 as well as Ecopa Arena in Fukuroi, Shizuoka on February 5 and 7.

The White Box Tour is the fourth main installment of the Yuzuru Hanyu Ice Story series, produced and directed by Hanyu himself in collaboration with Japanese choreographer Mikiko. The second half of Hanyu's preceding solo show Realive titled Prequel: Before the White, which was presented in 2026, served as a prequel for the main event. The show was announced to stage figure skating performances as living exhibits in an art museum.

== Background ==
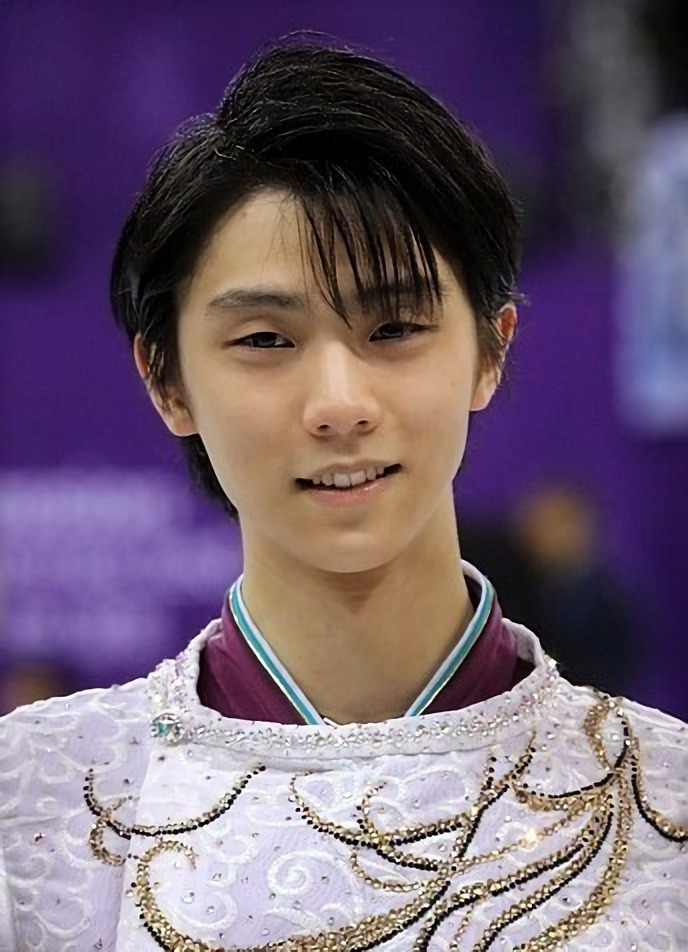
Yuzuru Hanyu at the 2018 Winter Olympics

Yuzuru Hanyu is a Japanese figure skater and ice show producer who competed in the men's singles discipline and turned professional in 2022. Regarded as one of the greatest skaters in the sport's history, he is the first two-time Olympic men's champion in 66 years with back-to-back gold medals at the 2014 and 2018 Winter Olympics, and the first male single skater to complete the Super Slam, having won all major international senior and junior titles in the course of his career.

His first major work as a professional skater is the ongoing Yuzuru Hanyu Ice Story, a series of solo ice shows produced by himself and directed by renowned Japanese choreographer Mikiko, who is internationally known for her collaboration with the J-pop trio Perfume and her involvement in the Tokyo handover segment at the 2016 Summer Olympics closing ceremony among others. Until the White Box Tour, the Ice Story series consisted of an introductory show titled Prologue (2022), the first solo ice show production in the history of figure skating, followed by three main installments with Gift (2023), the Repray Tour (2023–24), and the Echoes of Life Tour (2024–25) as well as the solo project Realive (2026). Each show featured 8 to 15 skating programs that were merged into a cohesive, sophisticated story supported with video narration by Hanyu on screen. The Ice Story series has been a huge commercial success, with all live performances being sold out by lottery and more than 200,000 spectators in attendance, as of April 2026.

== Tour dates and venues ==
Chronological list of tour dates and venues of the White Box Tour
Date	Venue	Location	Seat. capacity	Max. capacity	Image	Ref.
Jan 9, 11 & 13, 2027	Pia Arena MM	Yokohama (Kanagawa)	TBA	12,141	Outdoor view of Pia Arena MM	
Feb 5 & 7, 2027	Ecopa Arena	Fukuroi (Shizuoka)	TBA	10,000	Outdoor view of Ecopa Arena	

== Notes and references ==
=== Works cited ===
- Russell, Susan D. (September 6, 2022). "Yuzuru Hanyu – An icon leaves the competitive stage". International Figure Skating. Denville Township, New Jersey. pp. 22–33. IFSISS22-05.
