= Echoes of Life Tour =

2024–25 solo ice show tour in Japan by Yuzuru Hanyu

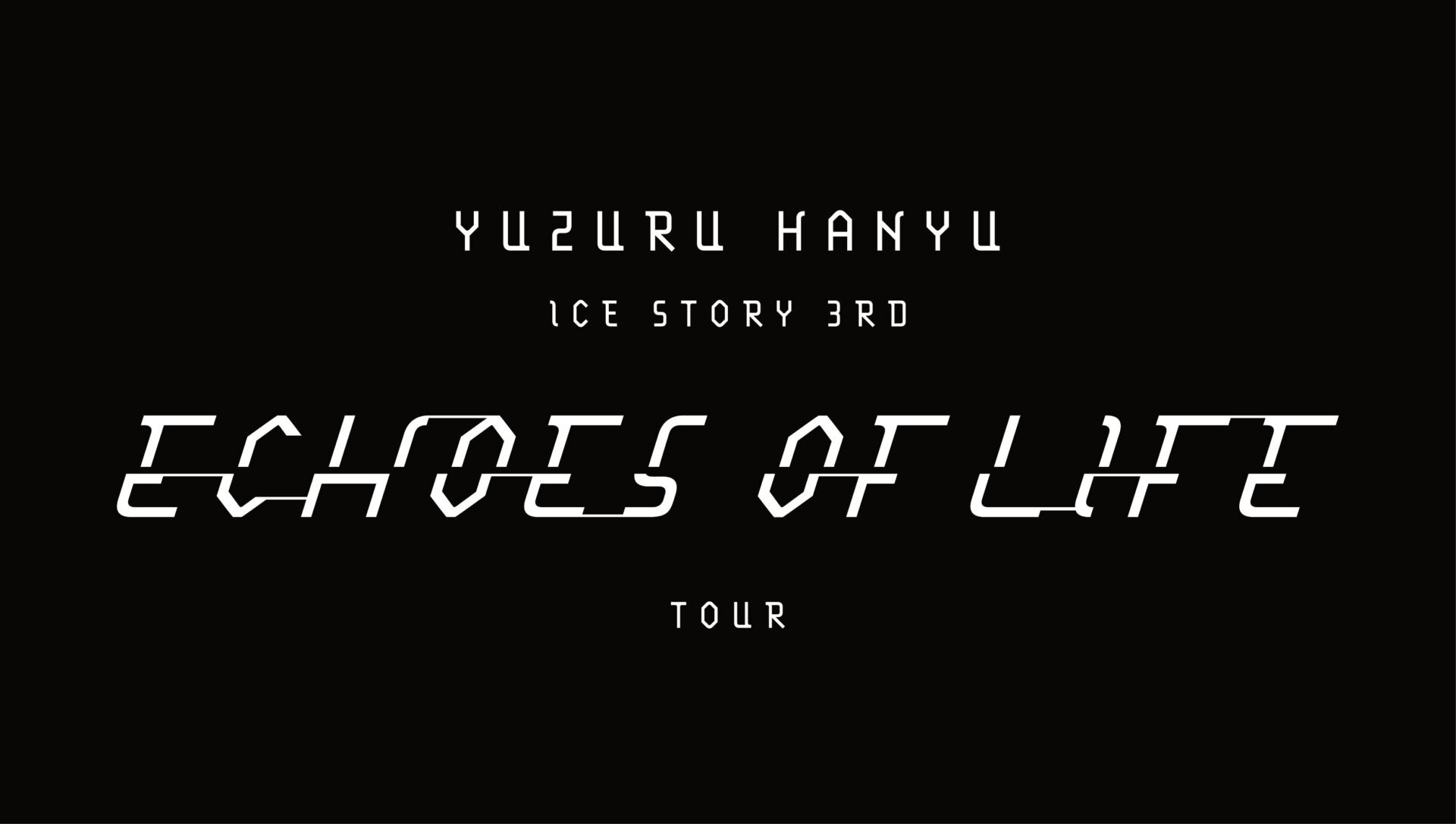
- Ice show type: Touring solo show
- Format: On-screen narration with live figure skating performances
- Theme: Meaning of human life
- Duration: 140 min
- Start date: December 7, 2024
- End date: February 9, 2025
- No. of shows: 7
- Country: Japan
- Venue: Saitama Super Arena; Hiroshima Green Arena; LaLa Arena
- Attendance: 42,000 (as of Dec 11, 2024)
- Cinema live viewing: Japan, Hong Kong, Taiwan
- Streaming: Beyond Live; SMG Great Sports
- Broadcast: CS TV Asahi
- Producer: Yuzuru Hanyu (performer)
- Director: Mikiko
- Organizer: TV Asahi; CIC Co., Ltd.; Team Sirius
- Sponsor: Tōwa Pharmaceutical; Phiten; Kosé; Telasa
- Website: echoesoflife.jp

Yuzuru Hanyu article series
- Skating career: Olympic seasons; Career achievements; Figure skating programs
- Other works: Bibliography
- Solo ice shows: Prologue; Gift; Repray Tour; Echoes of Life Tour; Realive
- Ensemble ice shows: Fantasy on Ice; Continues with Wings; Yuzuru Hanyu Notte Stellata

The Echoes of Life Tour (full title 'Yuzuru Hanyu Ice Story 3rd Echoes of Life Tour') is a solo ice show tour by Japanese figure skater and two-time Olympic champion Yuzuru Hanyu, organized by TV Asahi, CIC Co., Ltd., and Team Sirius. The tour had three stops from December 2024 to February 2025 at Saitama Super Arena in Saitama City, at Hiroshima Green Arena in Hiroshima, and LaLa Arena Tokyo-Bay in Funabashi, completing a total of seven performances.

The Echoes of Life Tour is the third main chapter of the Yuzuru Hanyu Ice Story series, produced and directed by Yuzuru Hanyu in collaboration with Japanese choreographer Mikiko. Each performance had a duration of 140 minutes and featured 15 different skating programs—a new record for solo ice shows. For Echoes of Life, Hanyu wrote the script in the form of a storybook that was released in advance in Japanese and English.

The programs were woven into a story spun through a futuristic staging that included light effects and elaborated videos created with 3D computer graphics, which were combined with figure skating programs performed by Hanyu, with some of them accompanied from the stage by the dance troupe Elevenplay. Hanyu plays the protagonist Nova, a being born through genetic engineering who seeks meaning in his own existence while searching for hope in a devastated world. The story touches on pressing contemporary issues such as war, education, and care work, offering a vision of entertainment that pushes beyond the traditional boundaries of ice shows. Hanyu wrote in the show’s pamphlet, “I wanted philosophy to be the theme of the show,” reflecting his long interest in philosophical questions around the meaning of life and living, one's role in society, and the meaning of bioethics.

On the third day of the Saitama tour stop, Hanyu performed a clean skate of his winning short program Ballade No. 1 from the 2018 Winter Olympics and successfully executed multiple quadruple jumps among others. On the final day of the tour, in Chiba, Hanyu delivered a complete clean performance of all 15 programs, including the encore.

The Saitama performance was sold out on all three days with a total attendance of 42,000 spectators. The Chiba performance was also sold out, with the arena filled to capacity with 8,300 people each day. Selected shows were screened live at cinemas in Japan and overseas, aired live on the subscription channel CS TV Asahi, and streamed live on SMG Great Sports in China and on Beyond Live worldwide. The tour is sponsored by Tōwa Pharmaceutical, Phiten, Kosé, and Telasa.

== Background ==
Yuzuru Hanyu is a Japanese figure skater and ice show producer who competed in the men's singles discipline and turned professional in 2022. Regarded as one of the greatest skaters in the sport's history, he is the first two-time Olympic men's champion in 66 years with back-to-back gold medals at the 2014 and 2018 Winter Olympics, and the first male single skater to complete the Super Slam, having won all major international senior and junior titles in the course of his career. He scored 19 world records in the ISU Judging System and was the first skater to land a quadruple loop jump in international competition among other achievements. On March 11, 2011, Hanyu experienced the Tōhoku earthquake and tsunami in his hometown of Sendai in Miyagi Prefecture, which fundamentally shaped his life and career. It was the most powerful earthquake recorded in Japan, which cost more than 19,000 people's lives.

Hanyu's first major work as a professional skater is the ongoing Yuzuru Hanyu Ice Story, a series of solo ice shows produced and directed by himself in collaboration with renowned Japanese choreographer Mikiko, known for her involvement in the Tokyo handover segment at the 2016 Summer Olympics closing ceremony among others. The Ice Story series was launched in November 2022 with Prologue, the first solo ice show production in figure skating. The second event and first main chapter of the Ice Story, titled Gift, was presented in February 2023 at Tokyo Dome in front of a record ice show audience of 35,000 spectators. Both productions focused on Hanyu's transition from competitive to professional skating, telling the story of his life and future on ice. The series continued with the Repray Tour, the first tour of solo ice shows, (Note: A show or concert tour usually consists of a minimum of three stops in distinct cities or venues. For that reason, Hanyu's first solo show Prologue may not qualify as a "tour".) held in four cities across Japan between November 2023 and April 2024. The show revolved around the world of video games and the contrasts between the virtual world and real life. On October 4, 2024, Hanyu announced his second solo tour titled Echoes of Life, with the first show being scheduled on his 30th birthday on December 7 in Saitama City. The tour is organized by Hanyu's management company Team Sirius in partnership with TV Asahi and CIC Co., Ltd.

== Venues ==
Locations of the Echoes of Life Tour

The Echoes of Life Tour was announced to consist of three tour stops across Japan between December 2024 and February 2025. The first stop is scheduled with three days on December 7, 9, and 11 at Saitama Super Arena in Saitama City, one of the most prestigious venues in competitive figure skating, having hosted three World Championships in 2014, 2019, and 2023 among others. For Hanyu, the venue is of particular meaning, having won his first World title there in 2014 as well as two national titles at the 2013–14 and 2021–22 Japan Championships. The first stop of the Repray Tour was also held at the venue in November 2023.

The Echoes of Life Tour continues with stops at the renovated Hiroshima Green Arena in Hiroshima in the southwest of Japan's main island Honshu, scheduled for January 3 and 5, and the newly built LaLa Arena Tokyo-Bay in Funabashi, Chiba Prefecture, with two shows being presented on February 7 and 9.

Chronological list of venues of the Echoes of Life Tour
Venue	Location	Seat. capacity	Max. capacity	Image	Ref.
Saitama Super Arena	Saitama City (Saitama)	14,000	22,500 (arena setting) 37,000 (stadium setting)	Ourdoor view of Saitama Super Arena	
Hiroshima Green Arena	Hiroshima City (Hiroshima)	TBA	6,000	Outdoor view of Hiroshima Green Arena	
LaLa Arena Tokyo-Bay	Funabashi (Chiba)	TBA	10,000	Outdoor view of LaLa Arena	

== Promotion and ticket sales ==
The Echoes of Life Tour was announced through Hanyu's social media accounts on October 4, 2024, with the official website being launched the same day. Hanyu revealed that the show's lead theme is "life's journey and growth", telling a story about the meaning and value of human life in a rapidly changing world, including the raising number of natural disasters, which he had experienced himself back in 2011. Hanyu further explained: "Now that artificial intelligence (AI) and technology are developing, things that only humans can do are starting to disappear more and more. However, I believe that if we work together with the production team and everyone who watches the performance, that moment will turn into something that only 'we [humans]' can do."

Ticket sales are staggered into multiple rounds, starting with official pre-sales for the Saitama performance on October 12. Tickets are distributed via lottery, with prices ranging from ¥15,000 for stand B seats to ¥30,000 for premier seats (US$100–202 as of October 2024). Sales are handled by the show's official organizer TV Asahi.

== Athletic merit and records ==
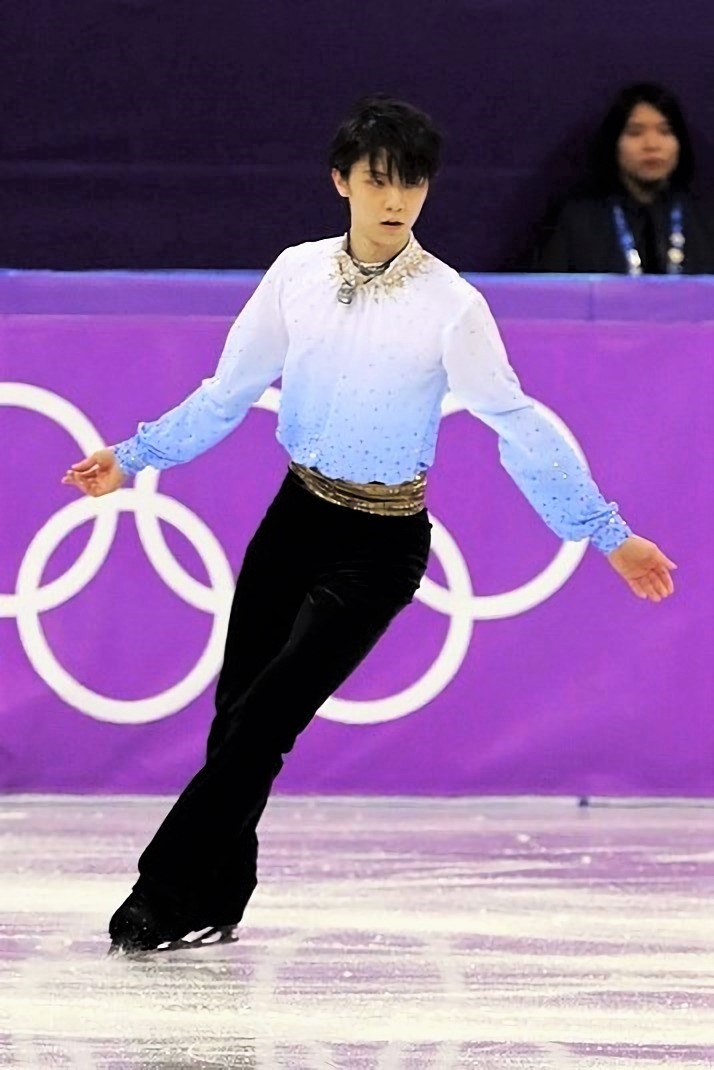
Hanyu performing Ballade No. 1 at the 2018 Winter Olympics

Each show of the Echoes of Life Tour has a total duration of 170 minutes, including a 30-minute intermission after the first half—a new record for solo ice shows. Compared to Gift and the Repray Tour, Hanyu increased the show's duration by 20 minutes and the number of performed programs from 12 to 15, seven of them being presented in the first half. The net performance time on the ice has also been upped from 53 to 70 minutes, now making up 50 % of the show.

A new athletic challenge is the ten-minute long Piano Collection medley, which consists of five skating segments. It features a quadruple toe loop and triple Axel jump, which are among the highest valued technical elements in competitive figure skating, as well as multiple energy-consuming elements like an extended spin combination and a sequence of twizzle turns. While the usual length of a competitive free skate program is about four minutes, the extension to ten minutes required special adjustments regarding choreography and athletic fitness. The late placement of the medley in the set list, performed 40 minutes after the start of the show, further increases the difficulty of execution. It is immediately followed by Hanyu's short program Ballade No. 1, presented with the same technical layout that was used in his winning performance at the 2018 Winter Olympics. On the third day of the Saitama tour stop, Hanyu skated a flawless performance of the Olympic program, featuring a quadruple Salchow, a triple Axel, and a quad toe loop-triple toe loop combination, executed late in the second half.

== Tourism and economic impact ==
Like previous events of the Ice Story series, the sold-out opening performance in Saitama had a notable impact on domestic tourism, commonly referred to as the "Hanyu effect" or "Hanyuconomy". Fans were queuing and taking commemorative photos in front of a large advertisement poster of the tour, set up at the Marunouchi central exit of Tokyo Station. Companies like the tour's co-sponsor Phiten and a Sendai-based cheesecake manufacturer sold exclusive products near Saitama Super Arena, with customers lining up an hour before the stores' opening. Among the visitors were many tourists from China and other overseas countries. The tour also had significant impact on the hospitality industry of the second host city Hiroshima. In the period of the upcoming tour stop between December 28 and January 5, travel services reported that Hiroshima ranks first among Japanese prefectures in growth rate of hotel reservations compared to the previous year (1.68 times).

== Attendance and accessibility ==
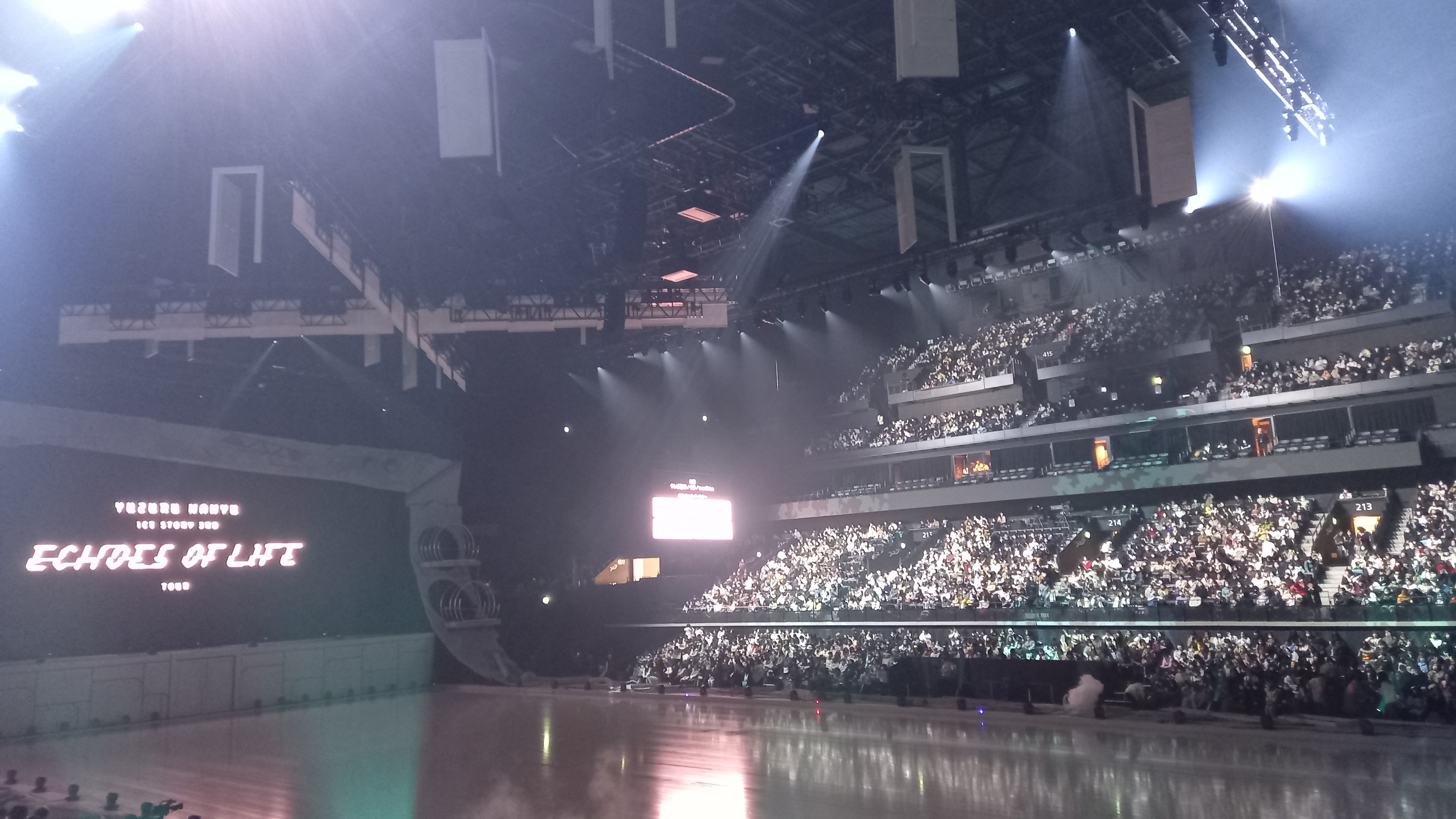
Audience on the last day of the Echoes of Life Tour at LaLa Arena in Chiba

All three days of the opening tour stop in Saitama were sold out by lottery with 14,000 spectators in attendance per day. Selected performances were screened live at cinemas in Japan, Hong Kong, and Taiwan and streamed on SMG Great Sports in China and Beyond Live worldwide. For the first time in the Ice Story series, the live shows offered audio guides in English. According to Nikkan Sports, the SMG streaming service was viewed by more than 400,000 people. In addition, all days were broadcast live or delayed on the Japanese subscription channel CS TV Asahi. The tour was sponsored by Tōwa Pharmaceutical, Phiten, Kosé, and Telasa.

- Attendance numbers do not include cinema live viewing events.
- Broadcast dates refer to the premiere on the subscription channel CS TV Asahi.
- Live streaming dates are identical to the live broadcasts on CS TV Asahi. Only exception is the second day of the Saitama tour stop, which was not distributed through the streaming service Beyond Live.

Chronological list of tour dates, attendance, and broadcasting
Date	Venue	Location	Attendance	Cinema	Broadcast	Ref.
Dec 7, 2024	Saitama Super Arena	Saitama City (Saitama)	14,000	Live; Dec 14, 2024	Live	
Dec 9, 2024	Saitama Super Arena	Saitama City (Saitama)	14,000	Live (Japan); Dec 24, 2024	Live	
Dec 11, 2024	Saitama Super Arena	Saitama City (Saitama)	14,000	–	Dec 21, 2024	
Jan 3, 2025	Hiroshima Green Arena	Hiroshima City (Hiroshima)		–	Mar 22, 2025	
Jan 5, 2025	Hiroshima Green Arena	Hiroshima City (Hiroshima)		Live; Jan 11, 2025	Live	
Feb 7, 2025	LaLa Arena Tokyo-Bay	Funabashi (Chiba)	8,300	–	Apr 26, 2025	
Feb 9, 2025	LaLa Arena Tokyo-Bay	Funabashi (Chiba)	8,300	Live; Feb 11, 2025	Live	
Total			58,600			

== Set list ==
First half

1. "First Pulse"
  (by Kenji Hiramatsu)
2. "First Echo" and "Circulation"
  (from Wolf Children by Masakatsu Takagi)
3. "Utai IV: Reawakening"
  (from Ghost in the Shell by Kenji Kawai)
4. "Mass Destruction: Reload"
  (from Persona 3 Reload by Lotus Juice)
5. Piano Collection (performed by Shinya Kiyozuka)
  1. No. 3 Ballade in G minor
    (from Six Pieces for Piano, Op. 118 by Johannes Brahms)
  2. Prelude and Fugue in C minor, BWV 847
    (from The Well-Tempered Clavier by Johann Sebastian Bach)
  3. Keyboard sonata in D minor, K. 141
    (by Domenico Scarlatti)
  4. Étude Op. 25, No. 12 in C minor – Ocean
    (by Frédéric Chopin)
  5. Étude Op. 10, No. 4 in C-sharp minor – Torrent
    (by Frédéric Chopin)
6. Ballade No. 1 in G minor
  (by Frédéric Chopin)
7. "Goliath"
  (by MoppySound)

Second half

8. "Aqua no tabiji"
  (by MoppySound, piano version)
9. "Eclipse/Blue"
  (by Nosaj Thing feat. Kazu Makino)
10. "Gate of Steiner – Aesthetics on Ice"
  (from Steins;Gate by Takeshi Abo, piano version)
11. "Danny Boy"
  (by Keith Jarrett)
12. "Hymn of the Soul"
  (from Persona 3 by Haruko Komiya)
Ending credits
"Nova"
(by Masakatsu Takagi)

Encore

13. "Let Me Entertain You"
  (by Robbie Williams)
14. "Ashura-chan"
  (by Ado; day 1 and 3)
  "Megalovania"
  (from Undertale by Toby Fox; day 2)
15. Seimei
  (from Onmyōji I and II by Shigeru Umebayashi; choreo sequence)

== Notes and references ==
=== Works cited ===
- Russell, Susan D. (September 6, 2022). "Yuzuru Hanyu – An icon leaves the competitive stage". International Figure Skating. Denville Township, New Jersey. pp. 22–33. IFSISS22-05.
