= Mikiko (choreographer) =

Japanese choreographer and dancer

MIKIKO
- Born: Mikiko Mizuno (水野幹子); 11 August 1977 (age 49); Tokyo, Japan
- Other name: Mikikometal
- Occupations: Choreographer, dancer
- Known for: Director of Elevenplay; choreographer for Perfume, Sakura Gakuin, Babymetal
- Website: Official website

Mikiko Mizuno (born 11 August 1977), known professionally as simply Mikiko or Mikikometal (both stylized in all caps), is a Japanese dancer and choreographer. She is the director and principal choreographer of the high-tech dance troupe Elevenplay, and also works with performers such as Perfume, Sakura Gakuin, and Babymetal. She was a production consultant and choreographer for Tokyo's handover presentation at the 2016 Summer Olympics closing ceremony.

== Early life ==
Mikiko was born in Tokyo, Japan. The youngest of three sisters, her family moved to Hiroshima when she was two years old due to her father's job transfer. Her home in Hiroshima was located along the Peace Boulevard where the Hiroshima Flower Festival was held every year in May, where she observed the process of building the framework of the stage. As her father worked at an advertising agency, she was able to see live performances and the work behind the scenes, and she learned about the choreography profession when she saw a live performance of Yomei Club from backstage. As a member of the baton club at Yasuda Girl's Junior High School, she participated in the Flower Festival stage and parade and began dancing in front of people, and started hip-hop dancing in high school.

== Career ==
In 1996, at the age of 19, Mikiko began teaching dance based on her experience in ballet and street dance. In 1999, at the age of 22 and while still in college, she became an instructor at the newly founded Actor's School Hiroshima. Her first students included the future members of Perfume, who were then in the fifth grade of elementary school. Mikiko has choreographed most of their songs, both as part of choreography lessons at the school and after Perfume left for Tokyo. The school holds two recitals every year, one in the spring and one in the fall, and she created choreography for about 50 songs a year for the students.

In 2000, Mikiko became a back-up dancer for MAX and formed the dance group VAX.

In 2005, at the age of 28, Mikiko signed a management contract with the Amuse Inc. talent agency, which had also signed Perfume two years prior, and moved to Tokyo to focus on creating work. She was recruited directly by Amuse chairman Yokichi Osato after he watched the stage play DRESS CODE, in which Mikiko worked on production, direction, and choreography. In order for her to become a theater director, Osato instructed her to move to New York to study stage production and improve her sensibility. While in the United States, she continued teaching dance to Perfume and other artists via video messaging. When she returned to Japan in 2008, she was unaware that Perfume already had their breakthrough hit with "Polyrhythm".

After returning to Japan, Mikiko continued choreographing and formed Elevenplay in 2009. Since the formation of Sakura Gakuin in 2010, she has choreographed all the songs for the group and its sub-units, including Babymetal. In 2012, she choreographed the fashion show "CanColle!" organized by the fashion magazines CanCam and AneCan.

In 2014, Elevenplay and Hatsune Miku performed as the opening acts of Lady Gaga's ArtRave: The Artpop Ball concert.

In 2016, Mikiko was in charge of the artistic part of the Olympic flag handover ceremony at the 2016 Summer Olympics closing ceremony. In the same year, she choreographed the "Koi Dance" for the ending of the TBS drama The Full-Time Wife Escapist.

In 2017, Mikiko was appointed to the planning committee of the 2020 Summer Olympics opening and closing ceremonies. However, it was announced on 23 December 2020 that the committee had been disbanded due to the "simplifications" necessitated by the COVID-19 pandemic, which had also caused the event itself to be delayed to July 2021.

In 2019, Mikiko choreographed the debut single "Pinky Promise" for @onefive, and Elevenplay later choreographed four additional songs.

On 31 December 2020, Perfume and Babymetal performed in the 71st NHK Kōhaku Uta Gassen. It was the thirteenth appearance of Perfume and the first for Babymetal.

On 26 February 2023, Mikiko directed Gift, the first figure skating event to be held at the Tokyo Dome. The solo ice show was produced and performed by two-time Olympic champion Yuzuru Hanyu. She continued to collaborate with Hanyu on his subsequent solo ice shows, Repray Tour (2023–2024), Echoes of Life Tour (2024–2025), and REALIVE an ICE STORY project (2026).

== Awards and honors ==
In 2014, Mikiko choreographed and directed an advertising video for Isetan that won the Good Design Award.

In 2015, Perfume's performance at the South by Southwest (SXSW) festival won the Prime Minister's Award/ACC Grand Prix in the interactive category of the ACC CM Festival. For this performance, Mikiko created the storyboard and advised artist and frequent collaborator Daito Manabe of Rhizomatiks and others on lighting and camera work.

In 2016, Mikiko choreographed the music video for "Cold Stares" by Nosaj Thing, which received the Award of Distinction at the Austrian Prix Ars Electronica awards in the Computer Animation/Film/VFX category.

In 2017, the Digital Media Association of Japan awarded Mikiko with the Jury's Special Award during the AMD Award '16. She was also selected as one of Vogue Japan's "Women of The Year".

In 2018, Mikiko and singer-songwriter Chisato Moritaka were inducted into the Fourth Women of Excellence Awards.

== Style ==
Mikiko's main objective is to show the beauty of the dancer's body and personality, which was inspired by the differences in body types and cultures she witnessed while in the United States. She uses everyday gestures in her choreography and sometimes deploys advanced technology such as projectors, drones, LEDs, and moving semi-transparent screens. The choreographer who has influenced her the most is Bob Fosse, who has an "aesthetic of subtraction".

On choreographing the dance for heavy metal, scriptwriter and producer Chiaki J. Konaka remarked that Mikiko's influences included the signature blast beats and guitar solos of the genre. For example, the riding dance in the intro of Babymetal's "Road of Resistance" is a visualization of the Gladstone drumming technique, and the dance in general is also synchronized with the guitar solos.

Perfume's choreography is influenced by science fiction imagery and emphasizes upper body and robot-like hand movements. Much of the cutting-edge technological aspects, such as drones, are proprietary technology developed in collaboration with the experimental digital art firm Rhizomatiks and tested by Elevenplay before implemented in Perfume's shows.

The choreography in the "Koi" dance describes the sound of the instruments and the lyrics through movement. Gen Hoshino described the choreography as "magnifying the charm of the song and its ability to communicate to the listener many times over.

== See also ==
- "Cube" (song), a music video directed and choreographed by Mikiko
