= Gift (ice show) =

2023 ice show in Japan

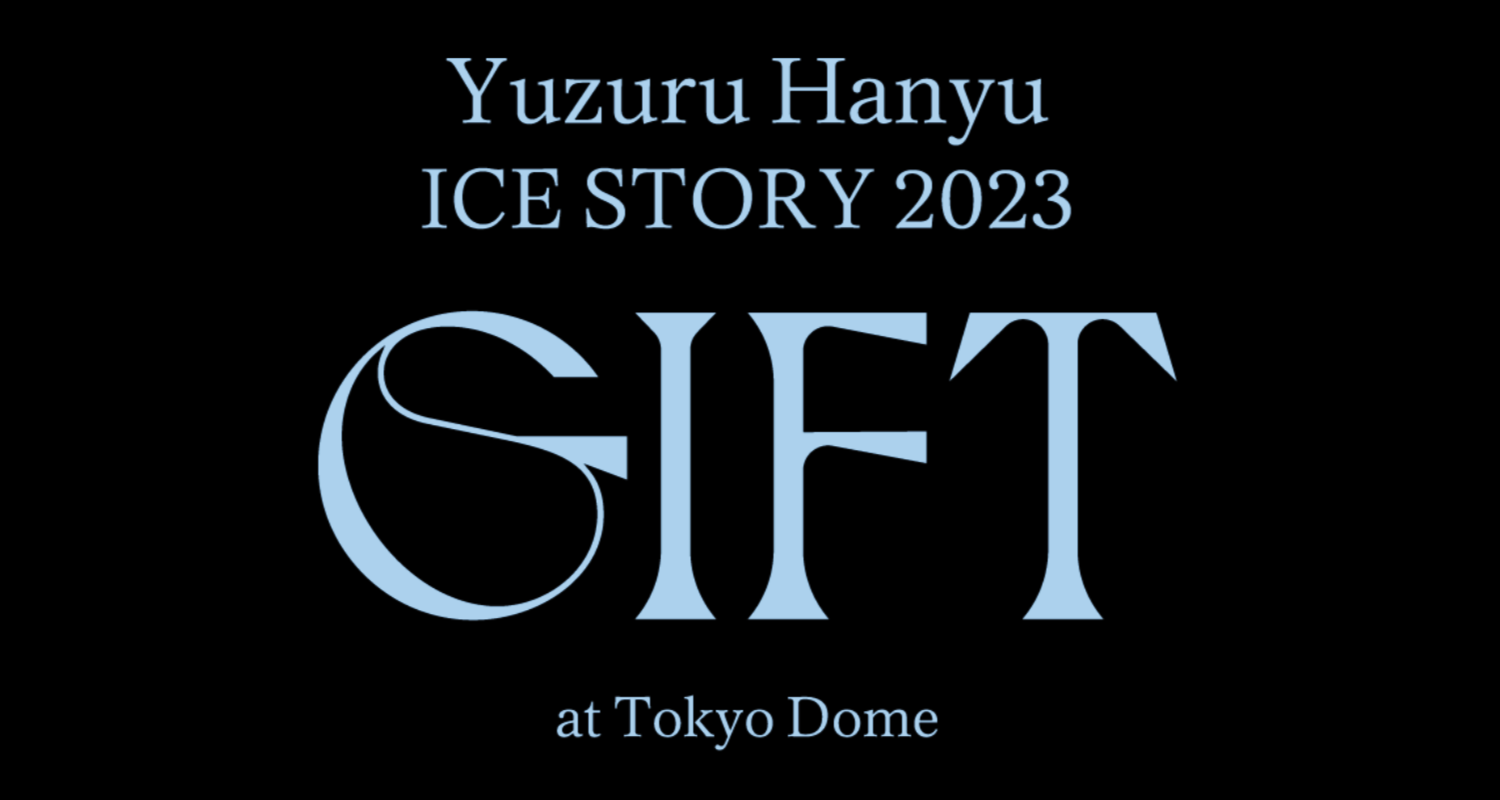
- Ice show type: Solo show
- Format: On-screen narration with live figure skating performances
- Theme: Yuzuru Hanyu's life and future on ice
- Duration: 120 min
- Date: February 26, 2023
- Country: Japan
- Venue: Tokyo Dome
- Attendance: 35,000
- Cinema live viewing: Hong Kong; Japan; South Korea; Taiwan
- Streaming: Disney+, Globe Coding
- Broadcast: TV Asahi
- Producer: Yuzuru Hanyu (performer)
- Director: Mikiko
- Organizer: Team Sirius; CIC; TV Asahi
- Sponsor: Sekkisei (Kosé); Phiten; Towa Pharmaceutical; Mitsui Fudosan
- Website: gift-official.jp

Yuzuru Hanyu article series
- Skating career: Olympic seasons; Career achievements; Figure skating programs
- Other works: Bibliography
- Solo ice shows: Prologue; Gift; Repray Tour; Echoes of Life Tour; Realive
- Ensemble ice shows: Fantasy on Ice; Continues with Wings; Yuzuru Hanyu Notte Stellata

Gift (full title stylized as 'Yuzuru Hanyu Ice Story 2023 GIFT at Tokyo Dome') was a solo ice show by Japanese figure skater and two-time consecutive Olympic champion Yuzuru Hanyu, organized by his management company Team Sirius, CIC, and TV Asahi. It was the first ice skating event at Tokyo Dome, (Note: The term ice skating covers all sports performed with blades on an ice surface, including ice hockey, figure skating, and speed skating.) one of Japan's largest and most prestigious entertainment venues, held on February 26, 2023.

Preluded by Prologue in 2022, Gift was the first main installment of the Yuzuru Hanyu Ice Story, a series of solo ice shows written, produced, and directed by Hanyu himself in collaboration with Japanese choreographer Mikiko. Gift told the story of Hanyu's life and future on ice, combining elaborate on-screen narration with live skating performances by Hanyu. The show had a duration of 150 minutes and featured 12 programs performed at the athletic level of skating competitions, including a six-minute warm-up session followed by Hanyu's short program Introduction and Rondo Capriccioso from the 2022 Winter Olympics. His performances were accompanied by the Tokyo Philharmonic Orchestra, the dance group Elevenplay, and a live band led by Satoshi Takebe.

The show was sold out with 35,000 spectators, a new audience record for ice shows. It was screened live at cinemas in Japan and overseas with 30,000 visitors in total, and streamed live on Disney+ in Japan and Globe Coding overseas. On July 14, 2023, a remastered version of the event was distributed on Disney+ worldwide. In addition to the ice show production, a picture book titled Gift with story by Hanyu and illustrations by the mangaka group Clamp was released in December 2023. On the first anniversary of the show, Gift was broadcast on the Japanese subscription channel CS TV Asahi. A DVD and Blu-ray recording of the show was released on August 20, 2024.

== Background ==
Gift was Hanyu's second solo ice show, performed on February 26, 2023, at Tokyo Dome in Bunkyo, Tokyo. The one-off event was again produced and directed by Hanyu in collaboration with choreographer Mikiko. The duration was extended from 90 to 150 minutes with an additional 40-minute intermission, using more advanced technology than at the previous show Prologue. According to Hanyu, Gift was designed with a narrative character, portraying his "life and future on ice". The show was constructed as a "journey through the worlds of his personality" with focus on dreams and the motif of lonesomeness. Hanyu expressed his hope that Gift could provide a "place to return to whenever people find themselves alone." He further explained: "The story is the main subject, and my programs exist within the story with various meanings. The programs are like a picture book, where you can watch the skating as if you were coming to appreciate a story." In addition to the show production, a picture book titled Gift was released on December 20, 2023, written by Hanyu with illustrations by the Japanese mangaka group Clamp who are internationally known for Card Captor Sakura among other works.

== Venue ==
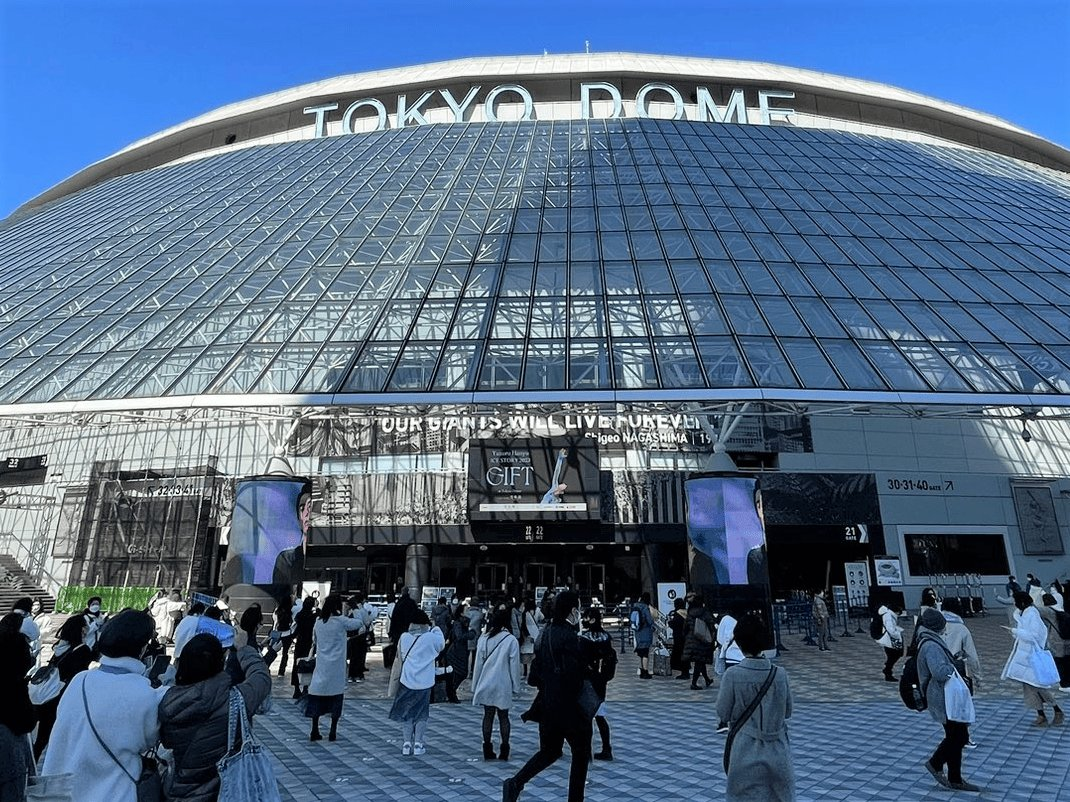
Outdoor view of Tokyo Dome on the day of the show, with a preview of Gift shown on screen

Gift marked the first time that a figure skater performed and an ice rink was set up at Tokyo Dome, one of Japan's largest multipurpose venues with a maximum capacity of 55,000 seats. It was constructed as a baseball stadium, home to the Yomiuri Giants, but it also serves as a concert venue, with Michael Jackson, Paul McCartney, The Rolling Stones, U2, Beyoncé, and Bruno Mars among past guest artists. Hanyu expressed his hope to "change how people perceive figure skating [with his show] at Tokyo Dome." The Olympics' official news site called Hanyu's programs at Gift "performances for the ages", noting that it was "more a concert for a blockbuster artist than an ice show." At the venue, a mobile ice rink was set up with dimensions of 60 m × 30 m, the standard rink size at international figure skating competitions.

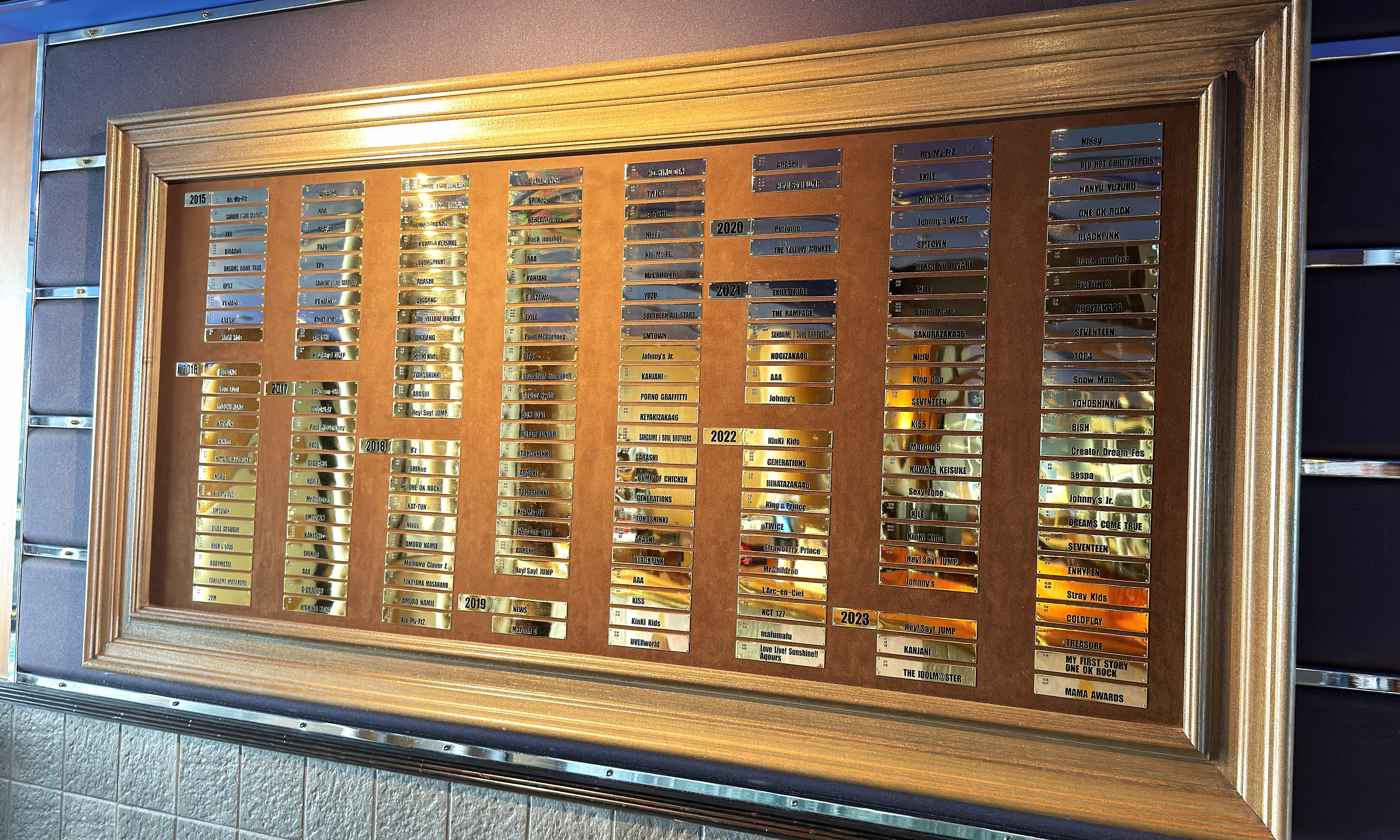
Nameplates of invited guest artists from 2015 to 2023, displayed in the Artist's Café at Tokyo Dome Hotel

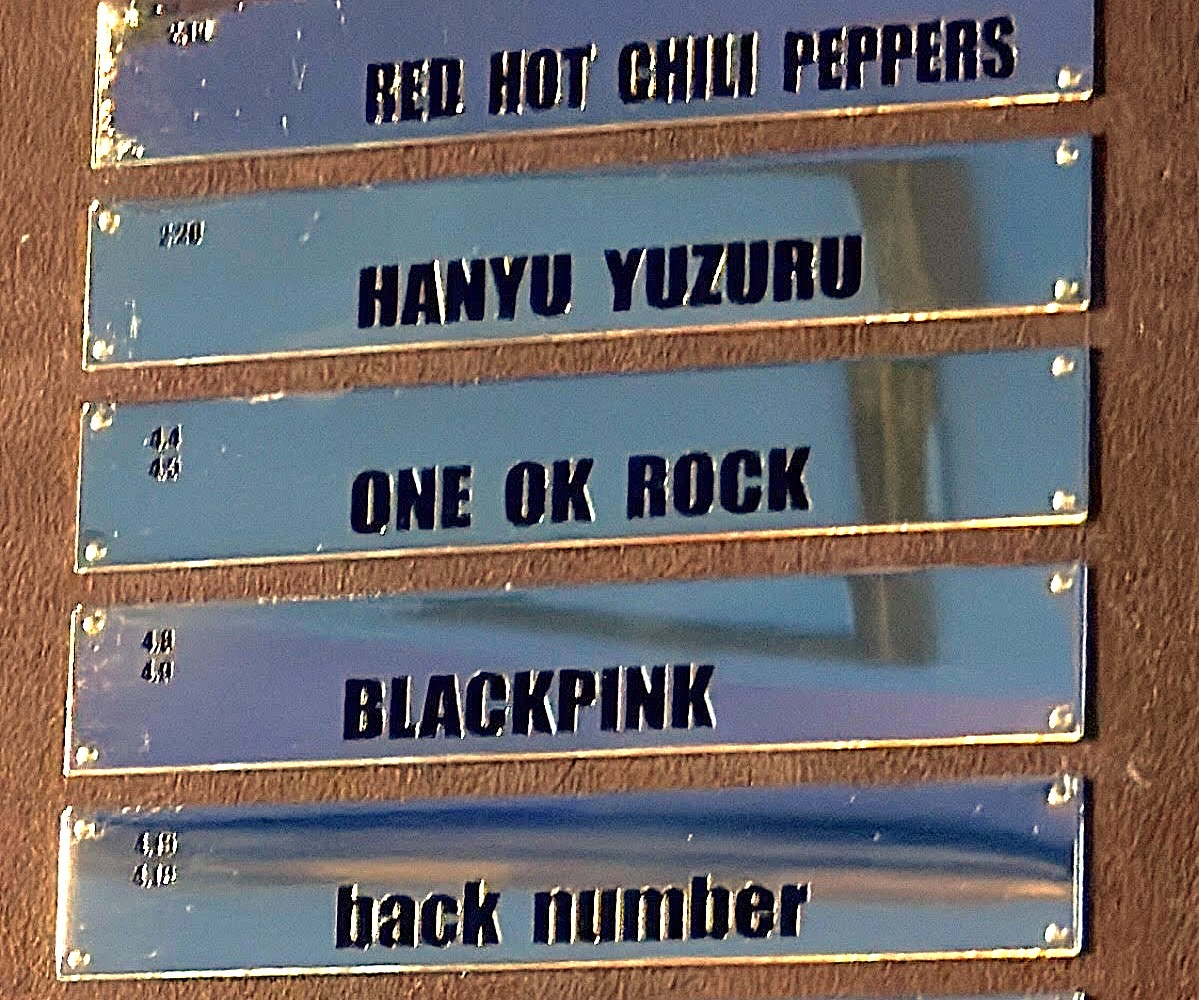
Yuzuru Hanyu's nameplate among the invited artists at Tokyo Dome in 2023

== Global concept and structure ==
For the narration and performances, a special screen was installed behind the rink, larger in size than the one used during baseball matches. In charge of the direction, projection mapping, and special effects was Mikiko in collaboration with the company Rhizomatiks. Among the guest artists were the Japanese dance group Elevenplay as well as the Tokyo Philharmonic Orchestra and a Gift special band led by music producer Satoshi Takebe.

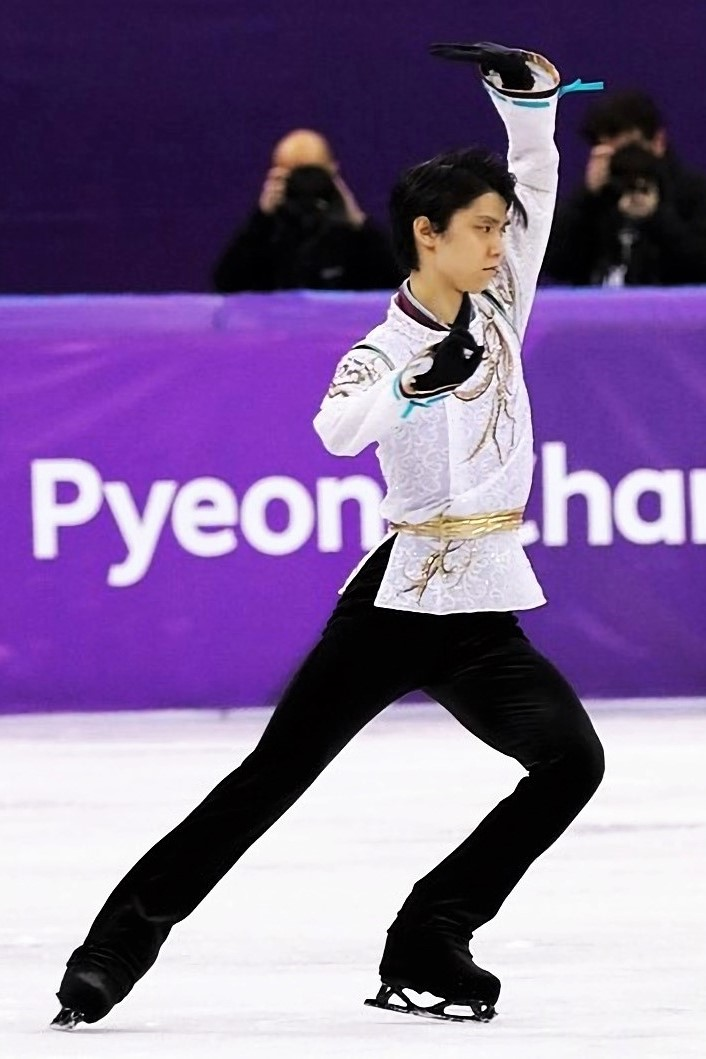
Hanyu skating to Seimei at the 2018 Winter Olympics

In the show, Hanyu performed a total of twelve skating programs, among them shortened versions of his world record programs Hope and Legacy, Ballade No. 1, and Seimei. He also presented two new programs to Joe Hisaishi's music piece "One Summer's Day" from the movie Spirited Away and to the song "Ashura-chan" by Japanese pop singer Ado. In both performances Hanyu was accompanied by Elevenplay. He concluded the first half with a six-minute warm-up followed by his short program Introduction and Rondo Capriccioso from the 2022 Winter Olympics. At the Olympics, after getting caught in a hole in the ice, Hanyu had turned his opening quad Salchow jump into a single, which was a factor in missing out on a medal in his final Winter Games. At Gift, he gave a solid performance with the same technical difficulty as in 2022, landing both planned quads and a triple Axel. Overall, he landed six successful quadruple jumps in the first half of the show as well as multiple triple Axels in the second half, surpassing the technical merit of his previous show Prologue. In the finale, Satoshi Takebe presented a new music piece titled "Gift" for piano and orchestra, which he had composed exclusively for the show.

== Critical reception ==
Russian world champion Elizaveta Tuktamysheva expressed her respect for Hanyu's physical capacity and pointed out his popularity in Japan, which in her opinion was a key to the production of Gift:

I think, [a show like this] could only take place in Japan and only with Yuzuru Hanyu because he is like a deity there. He is admired by millions of people and a very popular figure skater. I cannot imagine how he survived this. It is insanely difficult! Even three programs in a show are physically very challenging to skate already, but performing for three hours on end ... It is really cool, however, I am not that kind of bird, and I don't think I could do that myself. Could such a show format take root in Russia? I am not sure. We have many great skaters, but I can't single out anyone who would be able to do the same thing.

Prior to the event, critics such as the Japanese evening newspaper Nikkan Gendai had voiced concerns regarding the size of the venue among other issues. However, despite the large capacity and prices ranging from 23,100 to 27,500 yen ($177–210 as of 2023), tickets were distributed by lottery sale, and the number of applications exceeded the available ticket quota in the first lottery round, with multiple fans missing out on a chance to attend the show. On December 20, 2022, the hashtag #東京ドーム全滅 (lit. 'Tokyo Dome Annihilation') made it to the top trends on the social media platform Twitter.

== Attendance and accessibility ==
By February 12, 2023, the venue was sold out with seats for 35,000 spectators, a new record for an ice show audience, and sales exceeded an estimated total of 1 billion yen. (Note: The numbers include additional seats at the rink sides that were sold for 16,500 yen on February 25 and 26.) According to the Olympics, the global accessibility and live streaming of Gift was on an "unprecedented scale for a figure skating event" as well. The show was screened live at 84 movie theaters in Japan and also at cinemas overseas in Hong Kong, Taiwan, and South Korea, with 30,000 visitors in total. In addition, the event was aired live on the subscription streaming platforms Disney+ in Japan and Globe Coding by Live Viewing Japan Inc. worldwide. In total, Gift attracted 100,000 viewers. To accommodate demand, the show was rescreened on the following day at movie theaters in Japan.

On July 14, 2023, a remastered version of the show was distributed on Disney+ worldwide. On February 26, 2024, the first anniversary of the show, Gift was broadcast on the Japanese subscription channel CS TV Asahi. A DVD and Blu-ray of the full recording of the show with multi-angle perspectives and behind-the-scenes footage was released on August 20, 2024. A special limited edition with a key chain that contains water from the original ice rink in a small glass bottle, was announced to be distributed by lottery sale. It sold more than 17,000 copies in the first week ranking third on Oricon's Blu-ray and DVD weekly charts. The event was organized by Hanyu's management company Team Sirius in partnership with TV Asahi and CIC Co., Ltd. It received special sponsorship from Kosé's skin care brand Sekkisei. Other sponsors included Phiten, Tōwa Pharmaceutical, and Mitsui Fudosan.

== Set list ==
First half

1. The Firebird
  (by Igor Stravinsky)
2. Hope and Legacy
  ("View of Silence" and "Asian Dream Song" by Joe Hisaishi)
3. "One Summer's Day"
  (from Spirited Away by Joe Hisaishi)
4. Ballade No. 1 in G minor
  (by Frédéric Chopin)
5. Introduction and Rondo Capriccioso
  (by Camille Saint-Saëns, piano version by Shinya Kiyozuka)

Second half

6. "Let Me Entertain You"
  (by Robbie Williams)
7. "Ashura-chan"
  (by Ado)
8. The Phantom of the Opera
  (by Andrew Lloyd Webber)
9. "A Fleeting Dream"
  (from Final Fantasy X by Nobuo Uematsu and Masashi Hamauzu)
10. "Notte Stellata (The Swan)"
  (by Il Volo)

Ending credits

"Boku no koto"
(by Mrs. Green Apple)

Encore

11. "Haru yo, koi"
  (by Yumi Matsutoya, piano version by Shinya Kiyozuka)
12. Seimei
  (from Onmyōji I and II by Shigeru Umebayashi; choreo sequence)

== Notes and references ==
=== Official guide and documentary books ===
- Gift official (February 26, 2023). Yuzuru Hanyu Ice Story 2023 "GIFT" at Tokyo Dome ('Gift' special newspaper) (in Japanese). Shibuya, Tokyo: Amuse Inc. ID 90035213.
- Gift official (May 2023). Yuzuru Hanyu Ice Story 2023 "GIFT" at Tokyo Dome (Post-show booklet) (in Japanese). Shibuya, Tokyo: Amuse Inc. ID 90035204. 104 p.
