= Continues with Wings =

2018 ice show in Japan

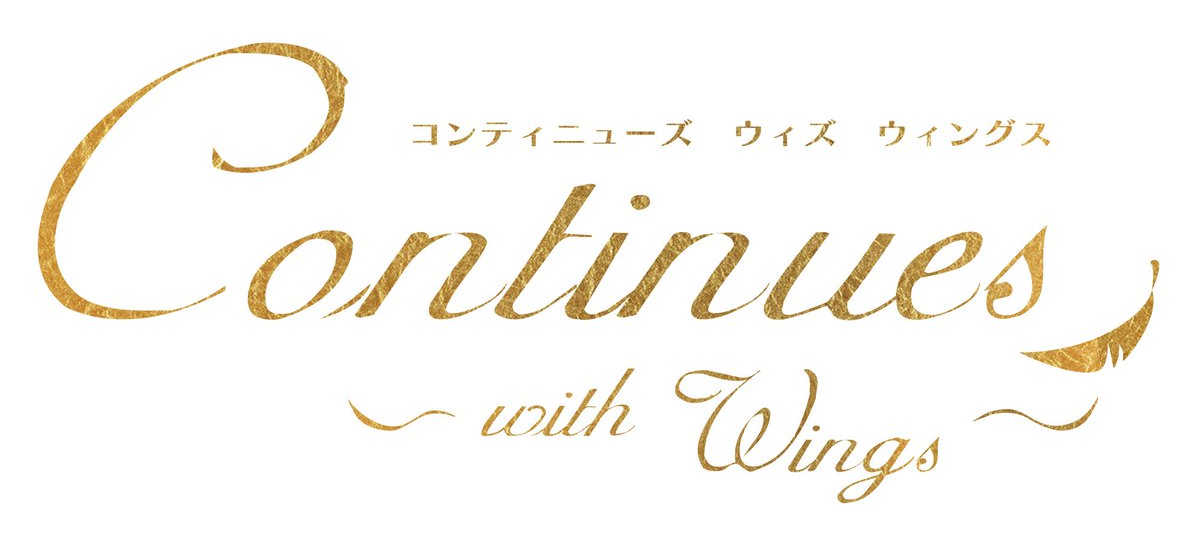
- Ice show type: Ensemble show
- Format: Figure skating exhibitions
- Theme: Commemoration of Hanyu's back-to-back Olympic titles
- Cast size: 9 skaters
- Duration: 180 min
- Date: April 13–15, 2018
- No. of shows: 3
- Country: Japan
- Venue: Musashino Forest Sport Plaza
- Attendance: 27,000
- Cinema live viewing: Japan (April 15, 2018)
- Broadcast: CS TV Asahi
- Chairperson: Yuzuru Hanyu
- Producer: TV Asahi; CIC Co., Ltd.
- Organizer: Continues with Wings Executive Committee
- Sponsor: ANA; Lotte; Phiten; P&J; (among others)
- Website: continueswithwings.com

Yuzuru Hanyu article series
- Skating career: Olympic seasons; Career achievements; Figure skating programs
- Other works: Bibliography
- Solo ice shows: Prologue; Gift; Repray Tour; Echoes of Life Tour; Realive
- Ensemble ice shows: Fantasy on Ice; Continues with Wings; Yuzuru Hanyu Notte Stellata

Continues with Ｗings (コンティニューズ・ウィズ・ウィングス; stylized as 'Continues ～with Wings～') was an ice show produced by Japanese figure skater and two-time Olympic champion Yuzuru Hanyu in collaboration with TV Asahi and CIC Co., Ltd. The one-off event was held on April 13–15, 2018, at Musashino Forest Sport Plaza in Chōfu, Tokyo. It was Hanyu's first self-produced ice show, commemorating his win of back-to-back Olympic titles in 2014 and 2018, and to express his gratitude to fans and skaters who had inspired and supported him in the course of his career.

== Background ==
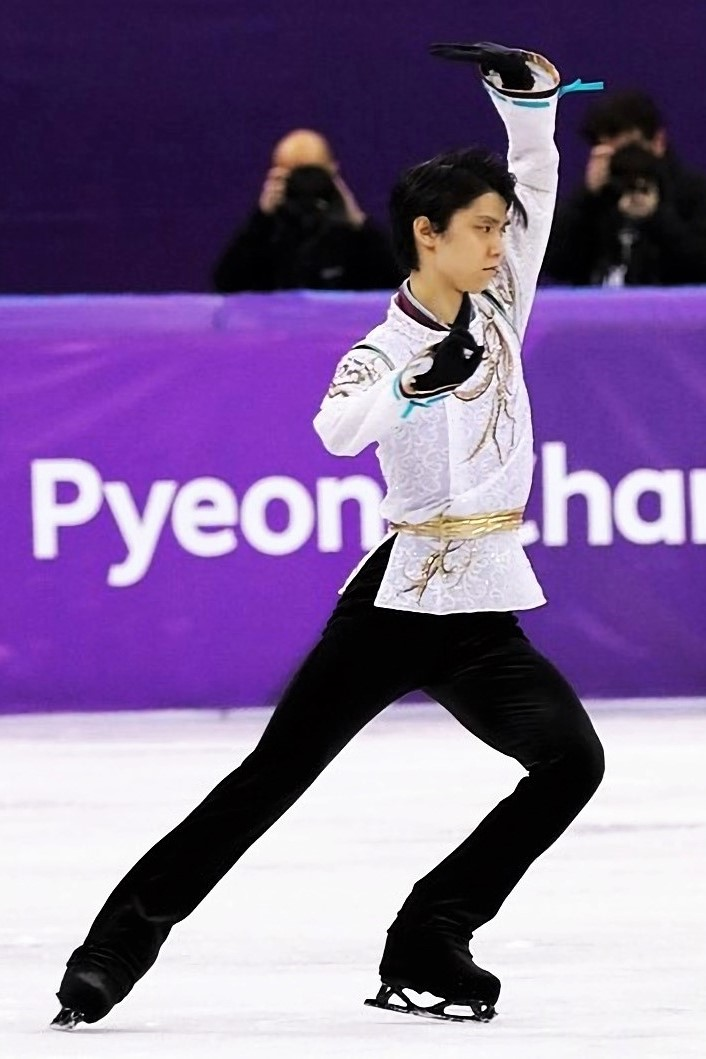
Hanyu skating to Seimei at the 2018 Winter Olympics

At the 2018 Winter Olympics, Yuzuru Hanyu from Japan became the first figure skater in 66 years to win back-to-back Olympic titles in the men's singles discipline after American Dick Button in 1952. At his first Winter Games in 2014, he also became the youngest Olympic men's champion since Button in 1948. Hanyu is the first Asian male skater and second Japanese after Shizuka Arakawa in 2006 to win Olympic gold.

Continues with Wings was scheduled two months after Hanyu's victory at the 2018 Winter Olympics to commemorate his historic achievements and express his gratitude to skaters who had inspired and supported him in course of his career until then. The cast included coaches, choreographers, and teammates as well as Hanyu's role models in figure skating. Due to rehabilitation from a ligament injury in his right foot, which Hanyu had sustained in November 2017 after a fall on a quadruple Lutz jump, it was announced prior to the show that he would not perform on the ice himself.

== Concept and structure of the show ==
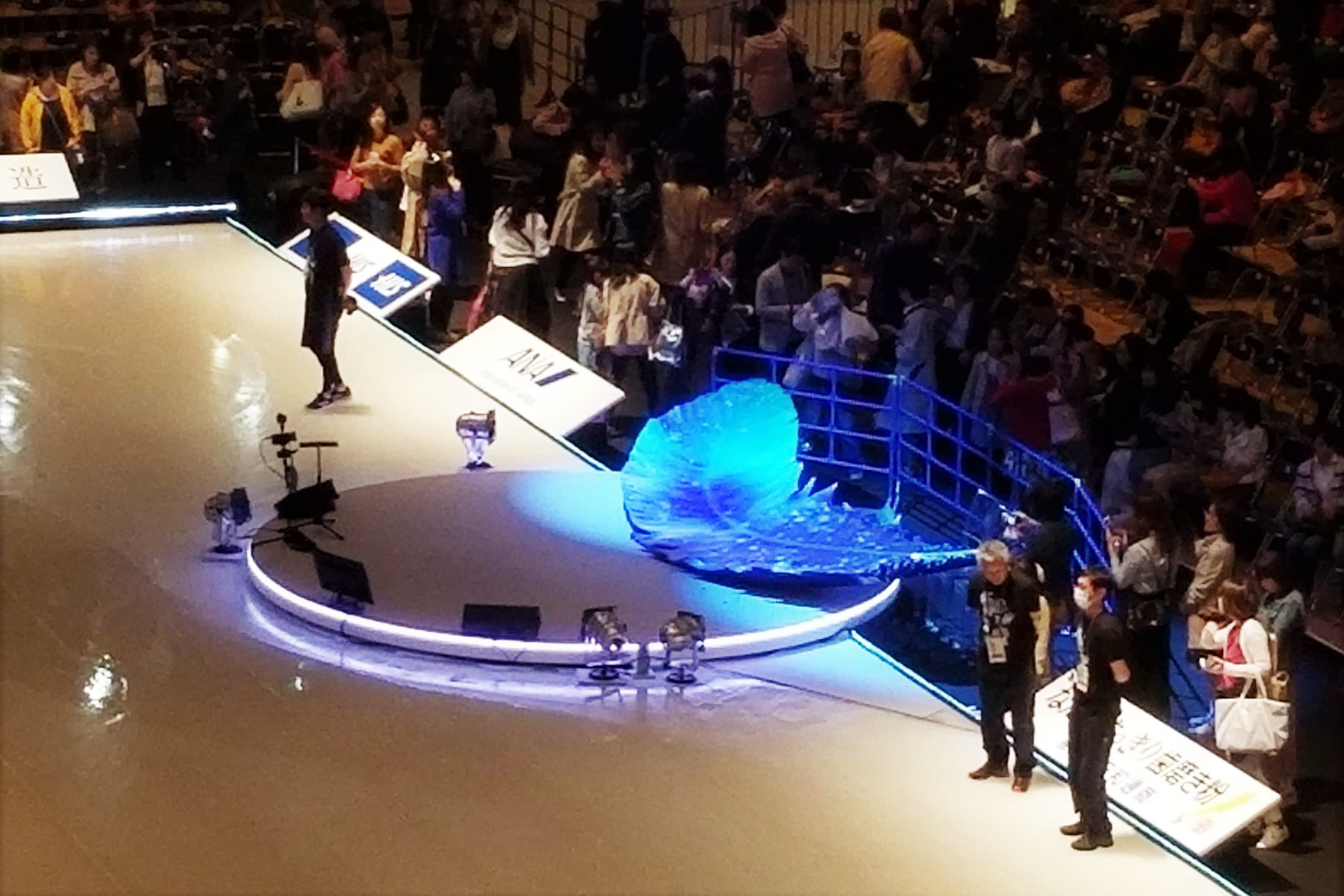
Side view of the stage at Continues with Wings in the Musashino Forest Sport Plaza in Chōfu, Tokyo

The show lasted 2.5 hours and was directed by Hanyu, featuring a mix of exhibition programs as well as multiple talk rounds between Hanyu and the invited skaters. Each guest was introduced with a personal video message by Hanyu. Due to his recuperation from an ankle injury, he was not initially scheduled to perform. However, at the end of the show, he gave a surprise performance with a medley of past competition programs, skipping jump elements due to the injury. The show finale was arranged by Hanyu's former choreographers Jeffrey Buttle and Shae-Lynn Bourne to the song "Time to Say Goodbye", performed by the full cast.

== Skaters ==
=== Main cast ===
Skaters at Continues with Wings
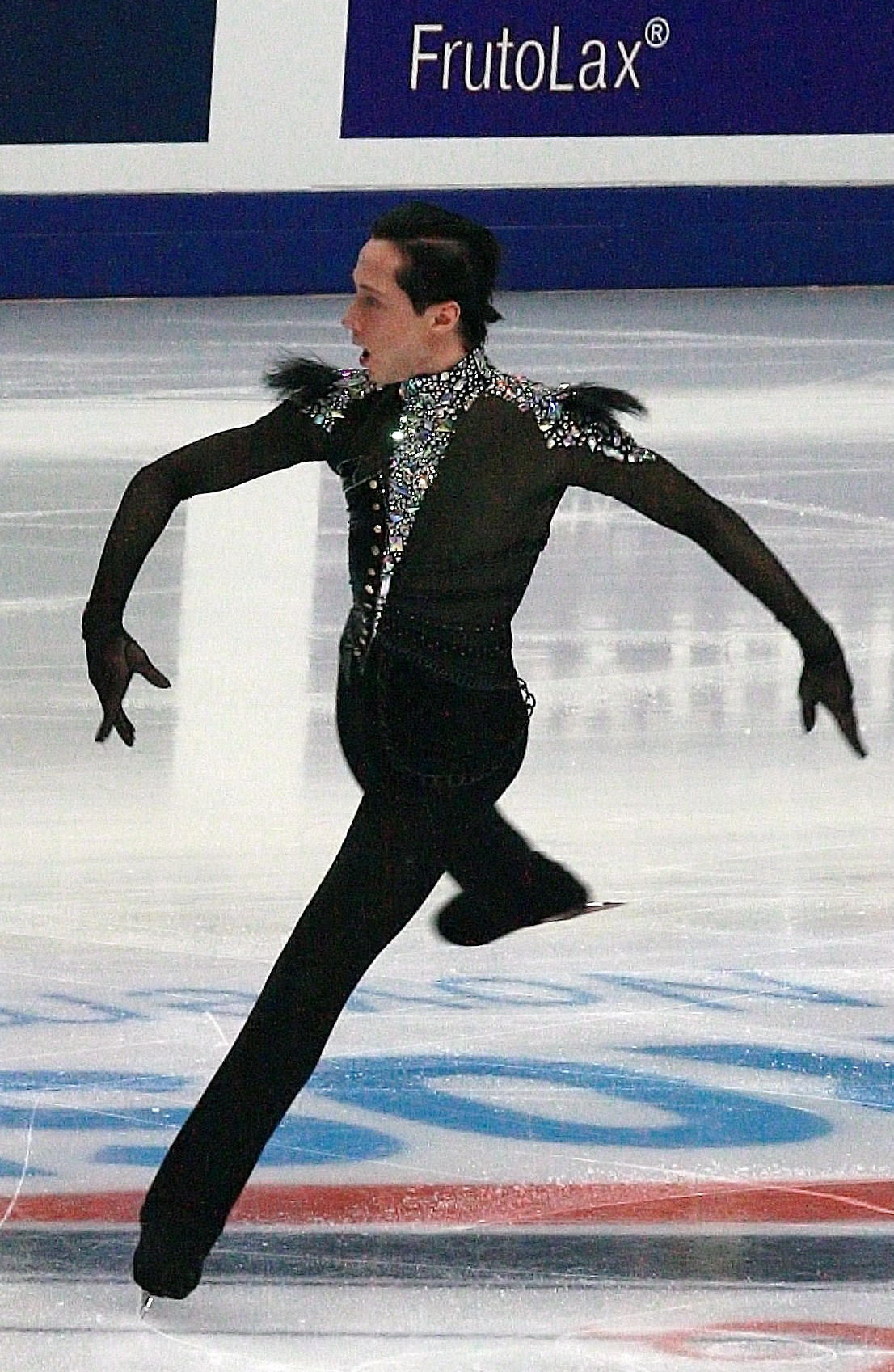
Johnny Weir

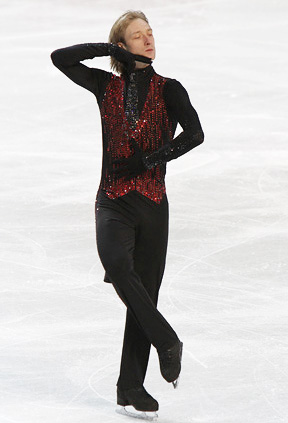
Evgeni Plushenko

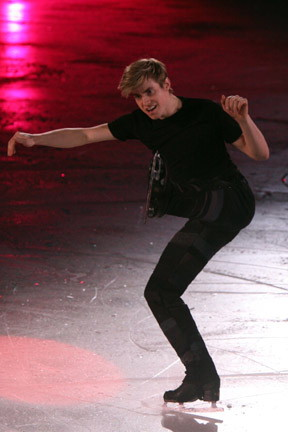
Jeffrey Buttle

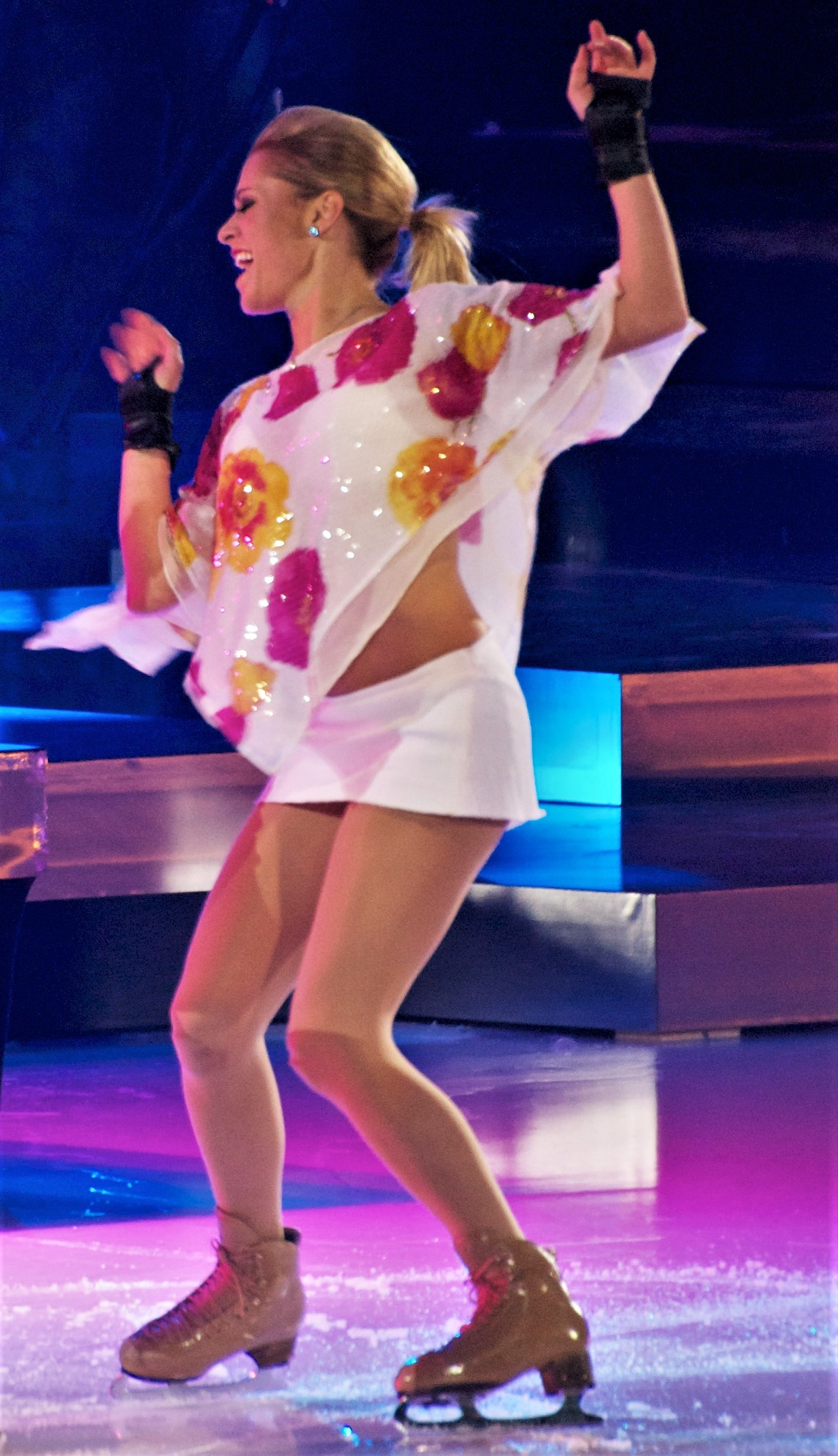
Shae-Lynn Bourne

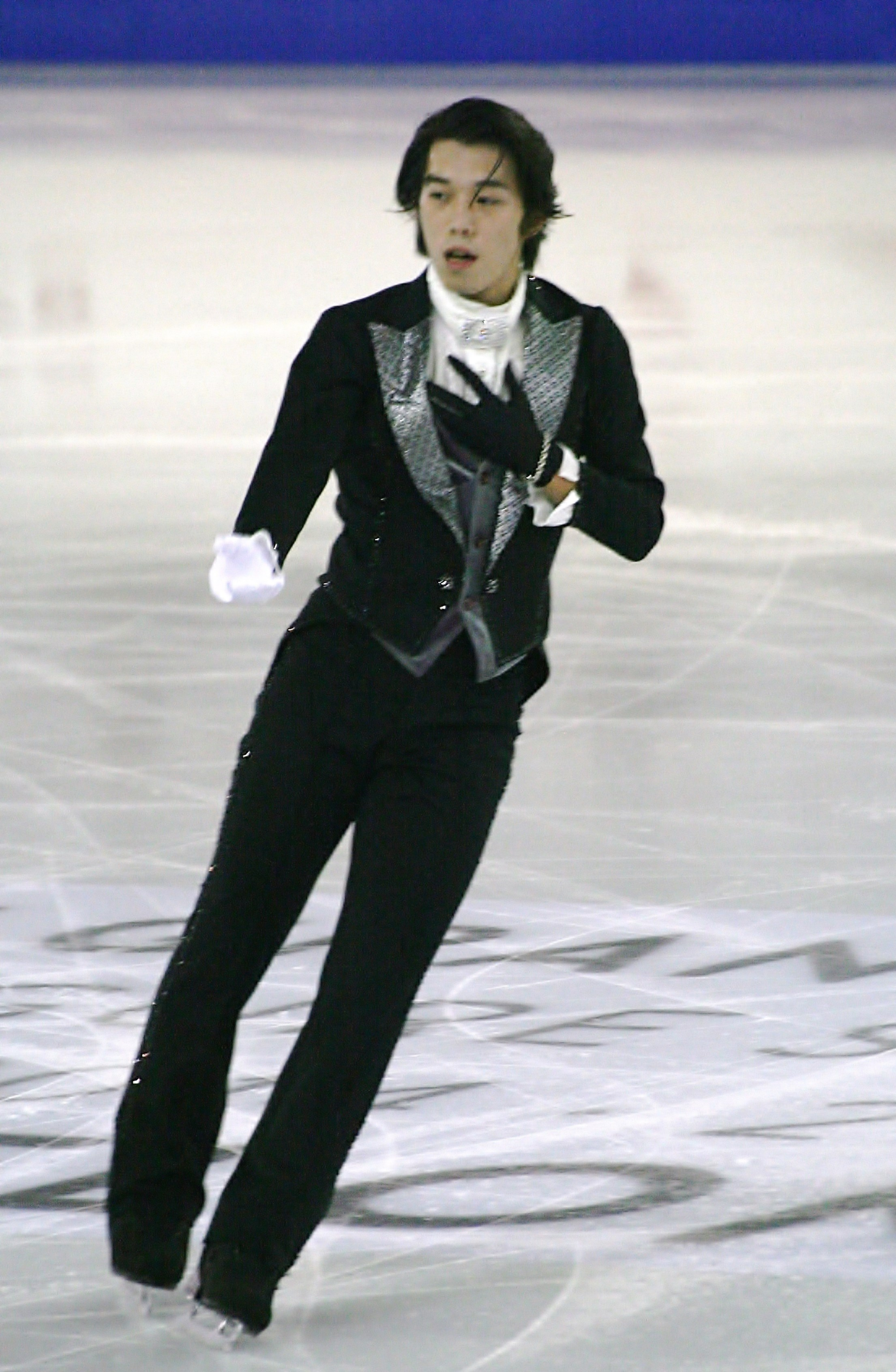
Takahito Mura

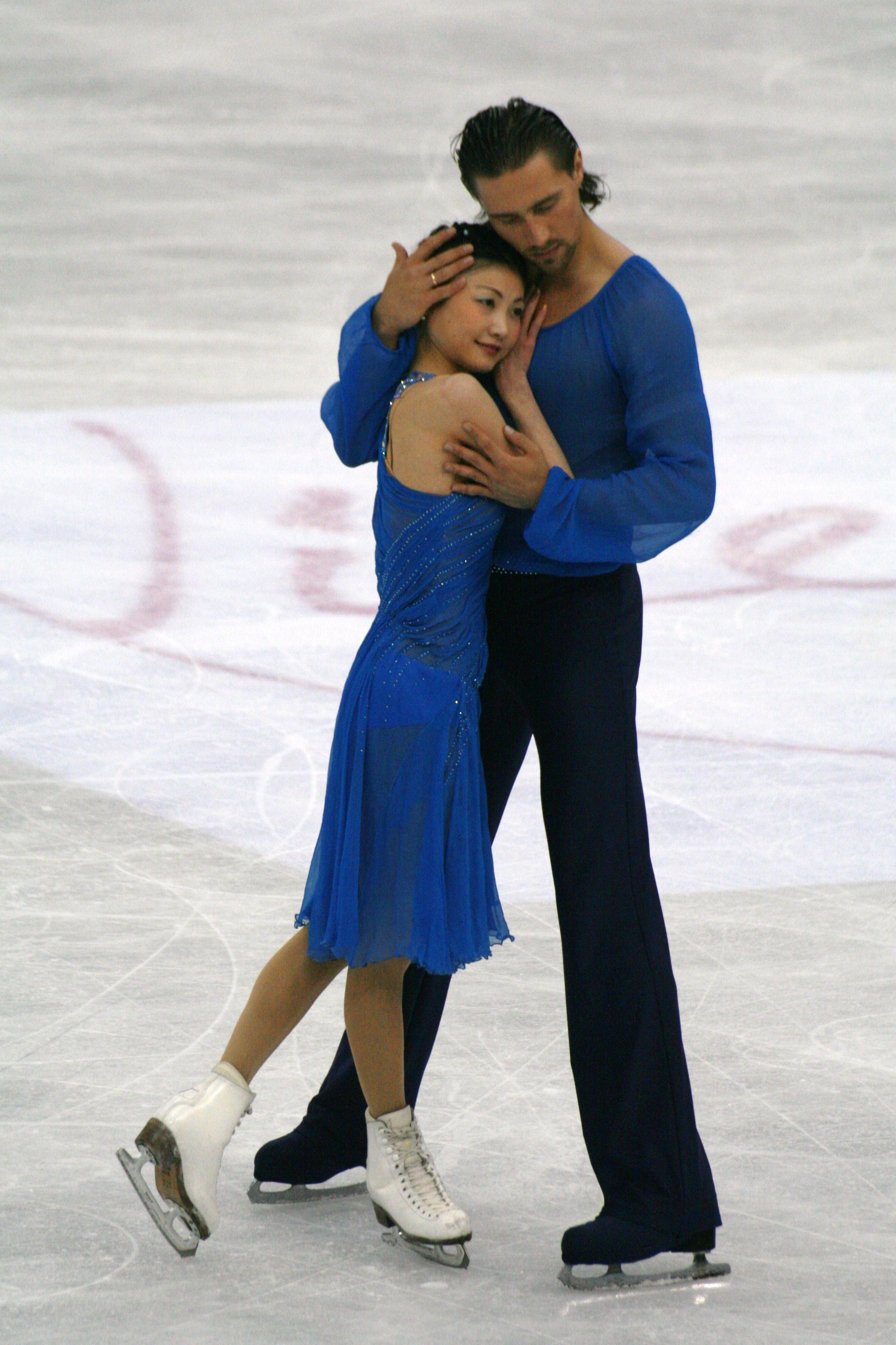
Yuko Kavaguti and Alexander Smirnov

==== Johnny Weir ====
Johnny Weir is an American television commentator and retired figure skater who has competed in the senior men's singles discipline. He is a two-time Olympian (2006, 2010), and the 2008 World bronze medalist. Known for his graceful and elegant skating style, Hanyu named him as one of his role models. Weir has designed two free skate costumes for Hanyu, among them his top for the 2013–14 Olympic season. In the 2018–19 and 2019–20 season, Hanyu dedicated his short program Otoñal by Raúl di Blasio to Weir who had skated his free program to the music piece in 2004–05. The two also performed together as lead cast members in the show Fantasy on Ice from 2010 until Weir's retirement in 2023.

==== Evgeni Plushenko ====
Evgeni Plushenko is a Russian figure skater and skating coach who has competed at four Winter Olympics (2002–2014), having won four medals, among them gold in men's singles in 2006 and the team event in 2014. Plushenko is one of Hanyu's childhood idols who influenced him in style and technique. Upon the conclusion of Continues with Wings, he was asked by Hanyu to allow him skate to Plushenko's 2003–04 free skate program Tribute to Nijinsky with music by Edvin Marton. With Plushenko's agreement, Hanyu used a new arrangement of the music piece for the free skate, titled Origin, and performed it as a tribute to his skating idol in the 2018–19 and 2019–20 season.

==== Jeffrey Buttle ====
Jeffrey Buttle is a Canadian figure skater and choreographer who has competed in men's singles. He is the bronze medalist of the 2006 Winter Olympics and the 2008 World champion. Buttle was in charge of Hanyu's short programs from 2012 until 2022, having choreographed six different programs for him, (Note: With the change of the judging system, the ISU decided to start the recording of highest score statistics from zero and declared all records historical that were achieved before the 2018–19 season.) which scored seven historical and three world records in international competition. He also made the choreography for the final group performance of Continues with Wings to the song "Time to Say Goodbye" in collaboration with Shae-Lynn Bourne.

==== Shae-Lynn Bourne ====
Shae-Lynn Bourne is a Canadian ice dancer and choreographer who competed with Victor Kraatz, becoming the 2003 World champions and finishing in fourth place at the 1998 and 2002 Winter Olympics. Bourne has choreographed all five of Hanyu's free skate programs from 2014 to 2022, which scored three historical and two world records in competition. She also contributed to the choreography of Hanyu's Olympic short program Introduction and Rondo Capriccioso in collaboration with Buttle. Since its inauguration in March 2023, Bourne has been a recurring cast member of the ice show Yuzuru Hanyu Notte Stellata, a commemoration event of the 2011 Tōhoku earthquake and tsunami in Rifu, Japan.

==== Takahito Mura ====
Takahito Mura is a Japanese figure skater who won the 2014 Four Contintents Championships in men's singles among others. He was Hanyu's senior and training partner at their home rink in Sendai, Japan. When Hanyu had moved up to junior level, Mura guided him in mastering the triple Axel jump, which later became one of Hanyu's signature elements and most consistent jumps in the history of figure skating. Like Bourne, Mura is also a recurring cast member at the ice show Yuzuru Hanyu Notte Stellata.

==== Yuko Kavaguti and Alexander Smirnov ====
Yuko Kavaguti is a retired Japanese figure skater who changed citizenship in 2007 and competed with her partner Alexander Smirnov for Russia in pair skating. They are the 2010 World bronze medalists and two-time European champions (2010, 2015). Kavaguti's successful move from Japan to Russia encouraged Hanyu to pursue a skating career overseas as well, moving from Sendai to Toronto, Canada, in 2012 to train under Brian Orser and Tracy Wilson at the Toronto Cricket Skating and Curling Club.

==== Minoru Sano ====
Minoru Sano is a retired Japanese figure skater who competed in men's singles. He is the 1977 World bronze medalist and founder of Prince Ice World, the first ice show to be held in Japan. It was Sano who introduced Hanyu and his sister to the sport of figure skating and "fundamentally inspired" Hanyu to start skating. From then, Hanyu was trained by Japanese coach Shōichirō Tsuzuki who also coached Sano and Kavaguti. For Sano, it was the first skating performance in 22 years at Continues with Wings at 66 years old.

=== Video messages ===
The invited guest skaters Stéphane Lambiel and Javier Fernández were not able to attend the show in person, so they sent video messages that were shown on screen at the venue. At the 2018 Winter Olympics, Hanyu named both skaters as his role models alongside Weir, Plushenko, and Dick Button. On the final day of the show, Hanyu's former training partner Javier Fernández gave a surprise performance of his Olympic free skate program Man of La Mancha, which was recorded live at Fernández' home rink in Madrid and shown on screen at the show.

== Attendance and accessibility ==
The venue was sold out on all three days of the show, with a capacity of 9,000 seats and ticket prices ranging from 6,000 to 18,000 yen ($57–171 as of 2018). The last day was screened live in 66 movie theaters nationwide and aired live on the Japanese subscription channel CS TV Asahi. On May 6, 2022, Continues with Wings was rebroadcast on the channel as part of the program special "Golden Week Figure Skating". The event was sponsored by the cleaning and skin care company P&G as well as the Japanese airline ANA among others.

== Set list ==
First half

1. Johnny Weir – "Ave Maria"
2. Takahito Mura – The Phantom of the Opera
3. Jeffrey Buttle – "For Forever"
4. Minoru Sano – "The Heart of Budapest"
5. Kawaguti / Smirnov – Manfred Symphony
6. Shae-Lynn Bourne – "Bom Bom"
7. Evgeni Plushenko – Tribute to Nijinsky

Second half

8. Takahito Mura – The Beauty and the Beast
9. Kavaguti / Smirnov – "Bubbly Dance"
10. Jeffrey Buttle – "Better to Be Loved"
11. Johnny Weir – Beyoncé medley
12. Evgeni Plushenko – "Tango Amore"
13. Yuzuru Hanyu – program medleys
14. Group finale – "Time to Say Goodbye"

Program medleys by Yuzuru Hanyu

Show 1

1. From Russia With Love
2. Zigeunerweisen
3. Ballade No. 1 (step sequence)

Show 2

1. Mission: Impossible II
2. Étude in D-sharp minor
3. "Parisienne Walkways"

Show 3

1. "Sing, Sing, Sing"
2. Romeo + Juliet
3. Seimei (choreo sequence)

== See also ==
- List of Olympic medalists in figure skating
- Figure skating at the 2014 Winter Olympics – Men's singles
- Figure skating at the 2018 Winter Olympics – Men's singles

== Notes and references ==
=== Official guide and documentary books ===
- CWW official (April 16, 2018a). 「Continues ～with Wings～」オフィシャルガイドブック [Continues with Wings – official guidebook] (in Japanese). Shibuya, Tokyo: Axel Entermedia Co., Ltd. ID 675. 40 p.
- CWW official (April 16, 2018b). 「Continues ～with Wings～」愛蔵版ブック [Continues with Wings – collector's edition book] (in Japanese). Shibuya, Tokyo: Axel Entermedia Co., Ltd. ID 687.

=== Print works cited ===
- FS Life (June 21, 2023). 華麗なるスケート衣装の世界IV [The world of splendid skating costumes IV]. Figure Skate Life Extra (in Japanese). Minato, Tokyo: Fusosha Publishing. ch. 4. ISBN 978-4594620592.
- Kiss & Cry (June 8, 2018). 「Continues～with Wings～」フォトリポート&佐野稔さんからメッセージ [Continues with Wings photo report & message from Minoru Sano]. Kiss & Cry (mook) (in Japanese). Vol. 21. Chūō, Tokyo: Tokyo News Agency. ISBN 978-4863367722.
- Kosaka, Yuki (May 5, 2018). 羽生結弦選手「2連覇おめでとう」祝賀パレード&凱旋アイスショーを総力レポート [Yuzuru Hanyu: "Congratulations on your second consecutive win!" Comprehensive report on the celebration parade and triumphant return to ice show]. Figure Skate Life (mook) (in Japanese). Vol. 14. Minato, Tokyo: Fusosha Publishing. pp. 14–27. ISBN 978-4594612887.
- Russell, Susan D. (September 6, 2022). "Yuzuru Hanyu – An icon leaves the competitive stage". International Figure Skating. Denville Township, New Jersey. pp. 22–33. IFSISS22-05.
- Takagi, Megumi (April 14, 2018). 羽生来季フル回転!!右足首の回復順調サプライズで滑った [Hanyu to compete at full power next season! Recovery of right ankle is going smoothly, skating a surprise performance]. Sports Hochi (in Japanese). Minato, Tokyo. p. 24. OCLC 835693295.
