= Rhizomatiks =

Japanese company

- Founded: 2006, Tokyo
- Headquarters: Tokyo
- Key people: Daito Manabe, Motoi Ishibashi, Seiichi Saito and Hidenori Chiba
- Website: rhizomatiks.com

Rhizomatiks is a Japanese creative collective dedicated to creating large scale commercial and artistic projects using both arts and technology. Founded in 2006, the company's members come largely from the fields of visual arts, media arts, computer programming, architecture and engineering. Rhizomatiks has collaborated with various professionals and companies to produce music, dance recitals, videos, and sports such as a figure skate, facing, basketball and synchronized swimming. It gained attention in 2008, with Daito Manabe's YouTube video, and in 2010 with Perfume's live concert at Tokyo Dome as well as its participation in Ars Electronica and transmedia festivals around the world.

== Origin ==
Rhizomatiks was founded as a collective of creative people in 2006 in Tokyo to work on large-scale commercial projects. Some of its early projects were in collaboration with the Japanese pop group Perfume, on their single Polyrhythm in 2007, which led to touring with the band. They first gained traction with a video piece published in 2008 called Electric Stimulus To Face, which gained more than a million YouTube views within the first month.

The company went international, becoming a fixture at transmedia festivals around the world and expanding its portfolio ten times over.

In 2014, Rhizomatiks collaborated with dance troupe Elevenplay, making an appearance at the Festival Internacional Cervantino. It also participated in the Art Fair Tokyo of 2015 with the display of its "mega-synth system," which worked like a regular synthesizer.

In 2023, the company collaborated with two-time Olympic champion Yuzuru Hanyu in the creation of his solo ice show Gift, the first ice show to be held at Tokyo Dome.

== Members ==
Rhizomatiks is a combination of creators from various fields such as architects, visual artists, media artists, designers, musicians, engineers and programmers.

The founder of the group is Daito Manabe, an artist, composer, programmer, designer, DJ and VJ. Manabe came from a traditional media art environment, with a degree in dynamic sensory programming from the International Academy of Media Arts and Sciences and a degree in mathematics from the Tokyo University of Science.

The CTO of the group is Tokyo-based artist and engineer Motoi Ishibashi. Ishibashi studied control systems engineering at the Tokyo Institute of Technology, as well as mechanical and image processing engineering at the Institute of Advanced Media Arts and Sciences (IAMAS) in Gifu, at the inception of digital media production. He met Manabe at IAMAS, who was also a student. In 2011, he and Manabe were the recipients of an Award of Distinction in the interactive art category of the Prix Ars Electronica. That same year, he received the Excellence Award at the 15th edition of the Japan Media Art Festival. Since 2015, he has co-directed Rhizomatiks Research along with Manabe, a strand devoted to research and development in the spheres of art, technology and entertainment. He is currently working on the development of new artistic methods touching on both the visual environment and the elaboration of engineering solutions in terms of artistic production and interactive public spaces.

Founding member Seiichi Saito studied architectural design at Columbia University in New York and worked in advertising, before returning to Japan and joining Rhizomatiks. He is noted for his three-dimensional interactive commercial artwork, based on architectural concepts. Alongside being the director of the company, he is a part-time lecturer at the Tokyo University of Science.

Another founding member is Hidenori Chiba, who has a background in website development. Currently, he is in charge of web design, system engineering and programming.

Other members of the company include Satoshi Horii, Daisuke Nakahama, Hiroyasu Kimora, Sumito Kamoi, Ichiro Kojima, Youichi Sakamoto, Muryo Honma, Keisuki Arikuni and others.

== Work and artistry ==
Rhizomatiks produces interactive materials, crossing the boundaries between design, art and entertainment. Projects often involve collecting massive amounts of data using motion capture, Kinect controllers and sensors to track dance movements in order to recreate human forms and movements as real-time 3D representations. It is also known for using projection mapping, lasers, sonar, robots and drones.

Rhizomatiks seeks using new ideas for artistic expression and commercial projects. Its commercial pieces tend to be large-scale due to the funding they receive, with leadership varying over projects. The company's founder Manabe claims "Rhizomatiks is like a music label". CTO Shunichi Shimizu claims "People with similar values gather and each person pursues different projects. They’re a challenging group of people, whether the project's commercial or noncommercial in nature, and they aren’t able to stop trying something new. They are not just artists, they’re also Japanese craftsmen who focus on detail. This might also explain why they are essentially ‘process driven’ in their approach to projects".
