= Repray Tour =

2023–24 solo ice show tour in Japan

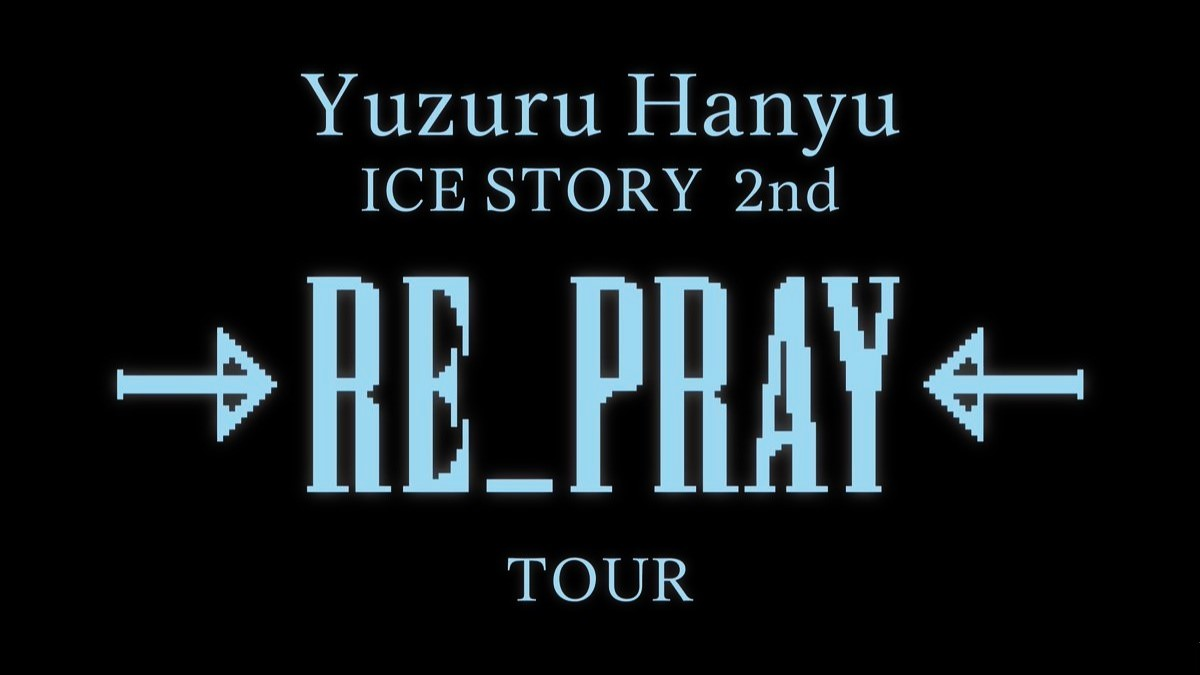
- Ice show type: Touring solo show
- Format: On-screen narration with live figure skating performances
- Theme: Gaming, virtual and real life
- Duration: 120 min
- Start date: November 4, 2023
- End date: April 9, 2024
- No. of shows: 8
- Country: Japan
- Venue: Saitama Super Arena; Saga Arena; Pia Arena MM; Sekisui Heim Super Arena
- Attendance: 64,600
- Cinema live viewing: Japan; Hong Kong; South Korea; Taiwan
- Streaming: Beyond Live
- Broadcast: CS TV Asahi
- Producer: Yuzuru Hanyu (performer)
- Director: Mikiko
- Organizer: TV Asahi; CIC Co., Ltd.; Team Sirius
- Sponsor: Tōwa Pharmaceutical; Phiten; Sekkisei
- Website: repray-icestory.jp

Yuzuru Hanyu article series
- Skating career: Olympic seasons; Career achievements; Figure skating programs
- Other works: Bibliography
- Solo ice shows: Prologue; Gift; Repray Tour; Echoes of Life Tour; Realive
- Ensemble ice shows: Fantasy on Ice; Continues with Wings; Yuzuru Hanyu Notte Stellata

The Repray Tour (full title stylized as 'Yuzuru Hanyu ICE STORY 2nd →RE_PRAY← TOUR') was a solo ice show tour by Japanese figure skater and two-time Olympic champion Yuzuru Hanyu, organized by TV Asahi, CIC Co., Ltd., and Team Sirius. The tour initially consisted of three stops across Japan from November 2023 to February 2024 at Saitama Super Arena in Saitama City, Saga Arena in Saga City, and Pia Arena MM in Yokohama. Upon the commercial success of the first three stops, it was decided to add another two shows at Sekisui Heim Super Arena in Rifu, held in April 2024.

The Repray Tour is the first solo ice show tour in the sport of figure skating, (Note: A show or concert tour usually consists of a minimum of three stops in distinct cities or venues. For that reason, Hanyu's first solo show Prologue may not qualify as a "tour".) produced and directed by Yuzuru Hanyu in collaboration with choreographer Mikiko. It is part of the Yuzuru Hanyu Ice Story series and a sequel to Hanyu's solo show Gift at Tokyo Dome in 2023. Each show of the Repray Tour had a duration of 120 minutes and featured 12 different skating programs embedded into a story revolving around video games and the contrasts of virtual and real life. On the first day of the Miyagi tour stop, Hanyu completed a 2.5-hour solo show with no mistakes for the first time, performing at the athletic level of skating competitions, including six quadruple jumps and five triple Axels with 3 1/2 revolutions.

The tour was sold out on each day with a total attendance of 64,600 spectators. Four shows were screened live at cinemas in Japan and overseas, aired live on the subscription channel CS TV Asahi, and streamed on Beyond Live worldwide. Two documentaries of the show were broadcast by TV Asahi on January 7 and May 5, 2024. A DVD and Blu-ray of the Miyagi performance of the show was released on January 23, 2026. The tour was sponsored by Tōwa Pharmaceutical and Phiten, with the first three tour stops receiving additional sponsorship by Kosé's skin care brand Sekkisei.

== Background ==
Yuzuru Hanyu is a Japanese figure skater and ice show producer who competed in the men's singles discipline and turned professional in 2022. Regarded as one of the greatest skaters in the sport's history, he is the first two-time Olympic men's champion in 66 years with back-to-back gold medals at the 2014 and 2018 Winter Olympics, and the first male single skater to complete the Super Slam, having won all major international senior and junior titles in the course of his career. He scored 19 world records in the ISU Judging System and was the first skater to land a quadruple loop jump in international competition among other achievements. On March 11, 2011, Hanyu experienced the Tōhoku earthquake and tsunami in his hometown of Sendai in Miyagi Prefecture, which fundamentally shaped his life and career. It was the most powerful earthquake recorded in Japan, which cost more than 19,000 people's lives.

Hanyu's first major work as a professional skater is the ongoing Yuzuru Hanyu Ice Story, a series of solo ice shows produced and directed by himself in collaboration with renowned Japanese choreographer Mikiko. The series was launched in November 2022 with Prologue, the first solo ice show production in figure skating, held in Yokohama and Hachinohe with five performances in total. The first main chapter of the Ice Story, titled Gift, was presented on February 26, 2023, at Tokyo Dome in front of a record ice show audience of 35,000 spectators. Both productions focused on Hanyu's transition from competitive to professional skating, telling the story of his life and future on ice. Following the universal acclaim and commercial success of Prologue and Gift, Hanyu announced on September 1, 2023, the continuation of the series with the Repray Tour, the first solo tour production in figure skating. The tour was organized by Hanyu's management company Team Sirius in partnership with TV Asahi and CIC Co., Ltd.

== Venues ==
Locations of the Repray Tour

The Repray Tour was initially scheduled with three tour stops across Japan between November 2023 and February 2024. The first show was set for November 4 and 5 at Saitama Super Arena in Saitama City, one of the most prestigious venues in competitive figure skating, having hosted three World Championships in 2014, 2019, and 2023 among others. For Hanyu, the venue was of particular importance, having won his first World title there in 2014 as well as two national titles at the 2013–14 and 2021–22 Japan Championships. The second tour stop was scheduled for January 12 and 14, 2024, at the newly built Saga Arena in Saga City on the Japanese island Kyushu, which opened on May 13, 2023. The initial tour concluded with a stop at Pia Arena MM in Yokohama on February 17 and 19, where Hanyu's first solo show Prologue was held in November 2022.

Upon the commercial success of the first three tour stops, the addition of another two shows was announced on March 6, 2024. The shows were scheduled for April 7 and 9 at Sekisui Heim Super Arena in Rifu near Hanyu's hometown of Sendai. The venue served as a morgue after the 2011 Tōhoku earthquake and tsunami and is home to the disaster's annual commemoration event Yuzuru Hanyu Notte Stellata, which was inaugurated in 2023.

Chronological list of venues of the Repray Tour
Venue	Location	Seat. capacity	Max. capacity	Image	Ref.
Saitama Super Arena	Saitama City (Saitama)	14,000	22,500 (arena setting) 37,000 (stadium setting)	Ourdoor view of Saitama Super Arena	
Saga Arena	Saga City (Saga)	5,500	8,400	Outdoor view of Saga Arena	
Pia Arena MM	Yokohama (Kanagawa)	7,000	12,141	Outdoor view of Pia Arena MM	
Sekisui Heim Super Arena	Rifu (Miyagi)	5,800	7,063	Outdoor view of Sekisui Heim Super Arena	

== Promotion and ticket sales ==
Similar to Hanyu's first two solo shows, there was little promotion or information provided on the content before the start of the tour. On September 1, 2023, Hanyu commented on the show's official website that the performance would be spun around the world of gaming, which was known as one of his passions, with focus on the contrasts between games and real life, stating: "You only live life once while games are never-ending. I believe the two contrasting worlds each have their own unique values that I can apply to skating." The first official visual, a blue-black pixelized image of Hanyu, was not revealed until after the conclusion of the second general sales period on October 27, 2023, eight days prior to the opening show in Saitama.

Ticket sales were staggered into multiple rounds, starting with official pre-sales, followed by two to three general sales and an official resale period for customers who were unable to attend the show. All tickets were distributed by lottery with exception of the final general sales, where a limited number of tickets was sold on first-come-first-served basis. Regular prices ranged from ¥22,000 for stand S seats to ¥30,000 for premier seats (US$145–198 as of April 2024). Some tickets for stand A seats with limited view were available for ¥16,000–19,000. Sales were handled by the show's official organizer TV Asahi and the Japanese ticketing agency Lawson Ticket. In order to prevent unauthorized resales or transfers, customers were required to register for an electronic ticket with name, phone number, and a specific TV Asahi ID, using an SMS authentification system. Tickets purchased via Lawson were excluded from official resales. All eight performances were sold out with 64,600 tickets in total.

== Production ==
=== Story and video segments ===
The lead theme of the show is the contrasting characteristics of the gaming world and the real world and their value for people's lives: "A life that can only be lived once, a game that can be played over and over again—I believe that there are many important things that can only be found in each of these two contradictory lives. The essential aspects of both will be entrusted to words and skating."

=== Music, programs, and costumes ===
Hanyu debuted three new programs to the songs "Gate of Living" by Japanese musician Ringo Sheena, "Megalovania" from the role-playing video game Undertale by American indie developer Toby Fox, and "The Darkness of Eternity" from the game Final Fantasy IX. The program "Megalovania" was preceded by a unique skating segment performed in silence with only the sound of the blades to be heard.

== Athletic merit and records ==
=== Live shows ===
Distribution of the presented content per show (intermission excluded)
1. Video segments and speeches (56.0%)
2. Programs (net skating time) (33.0%)
3. Programs (net dancing time) (6.00%)
4. 6-minute warm-up session (5.00%)

Each show of the Repray Tour had a total duration of 150 minutes, consisting of 53 minutes live performance on the ice, 67 minutes video narration and speeches, and a 30-minute intermission after the first show half. The opening tour stop in Saitama marked the first time in figure skating that two solo shows of 2.5 hours length were performed on consecutive days. Hanyu skated 12 programs and a choreographed 6-minute warm-up session on each day, levelling the record skating content of his solo show Gift at Tokyo Dome in February 2023. As noted by Russian world champion Elizaveta Tuktamysheva, skaters usually do not perform more than three programs per ice show due to the physical limitations in fitness and stamina. In order to successfully complete 12 programs, Hanyu made various adjustments to his training routines, having notably increased the workload compared to his competitive career.

The first half of the show was constructed in a way that all four key elements of single skating were represented by one program each. The opening program "A Fleeting Dream" showcased exclusively basic steps and skating movements, while "Gate of Living" highlighted dancing skills, including an off-ice dance segment on stage. The choreography of "Megalovania" was focusing on spins, and "The Darkness of Eternity" contained 11 jumps, seven of them performed in combination, matching the content of a competitive free skate. The program featured three quadruple jumps, the highest valued technical elements in figure skating, namely a quad Salchow and two quad toe loops, (Note: Among the six types of quadruple jumps, the Salchow and toe loop have the lowest assigned base value in the official Scale of Values published by the International Skating Union (ISU).) one of them executed in the second half as part of a unique quad toe loop-Euler-triple Salchow-Euler-triple Salchow combination. The element's numerical base value of 21.01 points (Note: The base value is calculated in accordance with the official ISU Scale of Values used since the 2022–23 season, including the 10% bonus for elements executed in the second half of a program.) exceeded Ilia Malinin's quad Lutz-Euler-triple flip combination (19.03 points), the highest valued and successfully executed element in competition until then.

On April 7, 2024, Hanyu completed a full 2.5-hour solo show with no mistakes for the first time, counting six quads, five triple Axels with 3 1/2 revolutions as well as 11 other triples, (Note: Three quads, one triple Axel and another two triples were performed in the choreographed 6-minute warm-up session.) and 20 spins in total—a new athletic milestone in the sport of figure skating. In comparison, the winning free skate of the men's singles champion Ilia Malinin at the 2024 World Championships, which scored a new world record of 227.79 points, included six quads of five different types, among them a quadruple Axel with 4 1/2 revolutions, as well as one triple Axel and three more triples.

- BV – Base value of a technical figure skating element in accordance with the ISU Scale of Values
- The statistics only consider the skating time and performed elements of listed programs. Warm-up sessions and dance segments are not included.
- The tables list the total number of performed jumps, counting each one within a combination or sequence separately. Jumps with 3 1/2 or more revolutions are listed in parentheses.
- A skating sequence refers to a full step or choreo sequence that meets the competitive requirements for single skating.

Skating content of the men's singles champion at the 2024 World Championships
Competition segment	Jumps	Spins	Skating sequences	Highest valued element	Performed programs	Net skating time	Date
Short program	4 (3)	3	1	4Lz+3T; BV 15.70	1	2:50	Mar 21, 2024
Free skating	11 (7)	3	2	4Lz+1Eu+3F; BV 19.03	1	4:00	Mar 23, 2024
Total	15 (10)	6	3		2 (av. 3:25)	6:50	

Skating content of the Miyagi tour stop at the Repray Tour
Show segment	Jumps	Spins	Skating sequences	Highest valued element	Performed programs	Net skating time	Date
Day 1	20 (7)	20	5	4T+1Eu+3S+1Eu+3S; BV 21.01	12	40:00	Apr 7, 2024
Day 2	18 (7)	19	3	4T+1Eu+3S+1Eu+3S; BV 21.01	12	40:00	Apr 9, 2024
Total	38 (14)	39	8		24 (av. 3:20)	1:20:00	

=== Ending credits ===
In his pre-recorded performance to the medley of Lufia II: Rise of the Sinistrals, Hanyu performed all six types of figure skating jumps, including a quad Salchow, quad toe loop, and a quad loop jump, which was only landed by Hanyu and 10 other skaters in international competition with a positive grade of execution until then. At the end of the program, Hanyu also performed a triple Axel-triple toe loop-triple loop combination, which was only attempted by Japanese skater Nobunari Oda in competition, successfully landed at the 2007 World Championships among others.

== Attendance and accessibility ==
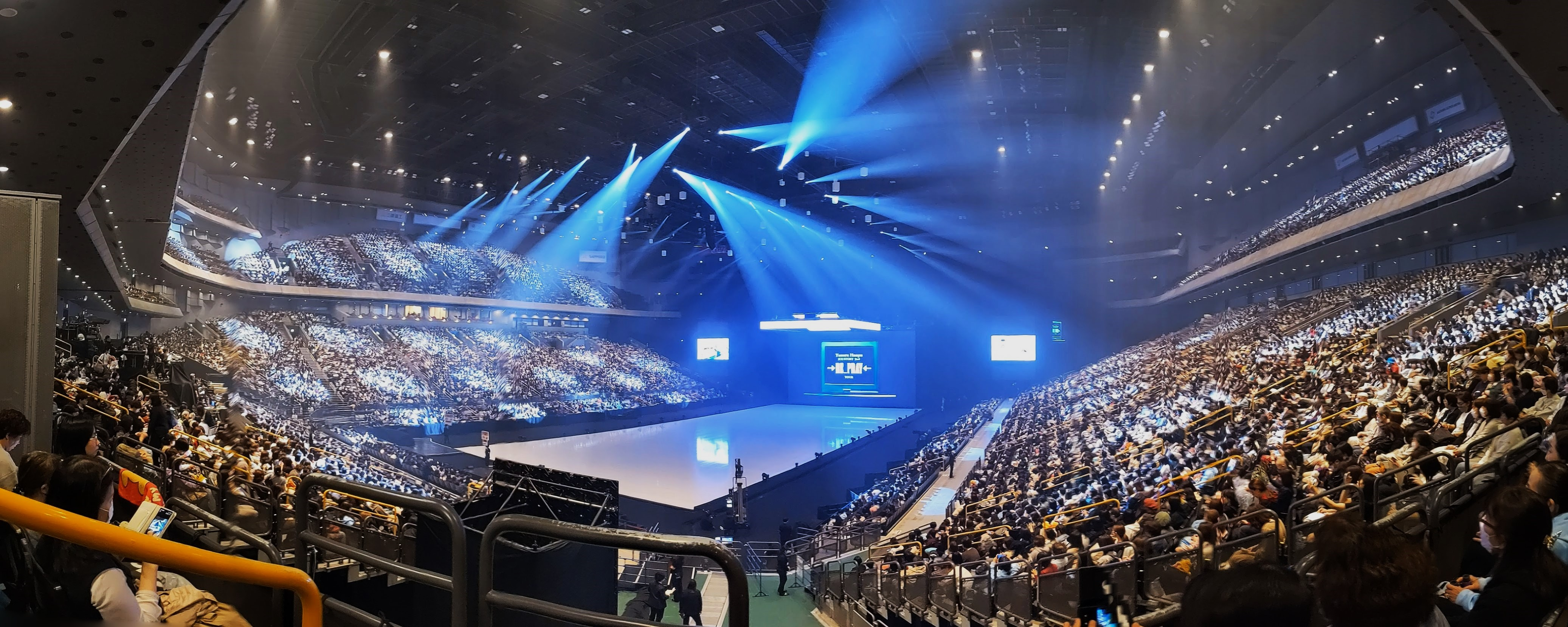
Audience on the first day of the Repray Tour at Saitama Super Arena

The performances of all tour stops were all sold out by lottery with 14,000 spectators in Saitama, 5,500 in Saga, 7,000 in Yokohama, and 5,800 in Rifu in attendance on each day. One selected day of each stop was screened live and delayed at cinemas in Japan, Hong Kong, Taiwan, and South Korea, and streamed on Beyond Live worldwide.

All eight shows were broadcast live or delayed on the Japanese subscription channel CS TV Asahi. A DVD and Blu-ray of the programs from Days 1 and 2 of the Miyagi performance selected by Hanyu and an audio commentary by Hanyu and Mikiko exploring the show's behind-the-scenes was released on January 23, 2026. It sold more than 15,000 copies in the first week ranking second on both Oricon's Blu-ray and DVD weekly charts. The show was sponsored by Tōwa Pharmaceutical and Phiten, with the first three tour stops being additionally supported by Kosé's skin care brand Sekkisei.

- Attendance numbers do not include cinema live viewing events.
- Broadcast dates refer to the premiere on the subscription channel CS TV Asahi.
- The dates for global live streaming on Beyond Live were identical to the selected dates for cinema live viewing and live broadcasts.

Chronological list of tour dates, attendance, and broadcasting
Date	Venue	Location	Attendance	Cinema	Broadcast	Ref.
Nov 4, 2023	Saitama Super Arena	Saitama City (Saitama)	14,000	Live; Nov 6, 2023	Live	
Nov 5, 2023	Saitama Super Arena	Saitama City (Saitama)	14,000	–	Dec 7, 2023	
Jan 12, 2024	Saga Arena	Saga City (Saga)	5,500	–	Mar 16, 2024	
Jan 14, 2024	Saga Arena	Saga City (Saga)	5,500	Live; Jan 16, 2024	Live	
Feb 17, 2024	Pia Arena MM	Yokohama (Kanagawa)	7,000	–	Apr 20, 2024	
Feb 19, 2024	Pia Arena MM	Yokohama (Kanagawa)	7,000	Live; Feb 25, 2024	Live	
Apr 7, 2024	Sekisui Heim Super Arena	Rifu (Miyagi)	5,800	–	Jul 6, 2024	
Apr 9, 2024	Sekisui Heim Super Arena	Rifu (Miyagi)	5,800	Live; Apr 13, 2024	Live	
Total			64,600			

== Specials and merchandise ==
On the occasion of Hanyu's 29th birthday on December 7, 2023, TV Asahi organized a special online event at Metaverse Roppongi. The virtual room was joined by 35,000 fans who could rewatch segments of the Repray Tour in Saitama among others. The event was also joined by Hanyu himself.

On January 7, 2024, TV Asahi aired a special documentary on the opening Saitama tour stop on their terrestrial channel. The documentary featured replays of Hanyu's performances, behind-the-scenes footage, and an exclusive interview with director and choreographer Mikiko. Notable was a backstage scene of Hanyu collapsing after his performance to "The Darkness of Eternity" at the end of the first half. Another documentary of 150 minutes with additional footage from the Yokohama and Miyagi tour stops and the creation process of the show was aired on CS TV Asahi on May 5, 2024.

On November 11, 2025, the second day of the Yokohama stop of Repray was re-screened in cinemas in all 47 prefectures of Japan.

== Set list ==
First half

1. "A Fleeting Dream"
  (from Final Fantasy X by Nobuo Uematsu and Masashi Hamauzu)
2. "Gate of Living"
  (by Ringo Sheena)
3. Hope and Legacy
  ("View of Silence" and "Asian Dream Song" by Joe Hisaishi; day 1)
  "Ashura-chan"
  (by Ado; day 2)
4. "Megalovania"
  (from Undertale by Toby Fox)
5. "The Darkness of Eternity"
  (from Final Fantasy IX by Nobuo Uematsu)

Second half

6. "A Fleeting Dream"
  (piano version by Shinya Kiyozuka)
7. "Requiem of Heaven and Earth"
  (by Yasunobu Matsuo)
8. "One Summer's Day"
  (from Spirited Away by Joe Hisaishi)
9. "Haru yo, koi"
  (by Yumi Matsutoya, piano version by Shinya Kiyozuka)

Ending credits

Lufia II: Rise of the Sinistrals
(by Yasunori Shiono)

Encore

10. "Let Me Entertain You"
  (by Robbie Williams)
11. Seimei
  (from Onmyōji I and II by Shigeru Umebayashi; choreo sequence)
12. Introduction and Rondo Capriccioso
  (by Camille Saint-Saëns, piano version by Shinya Kiyozuka; step sequence)

== Notes and references ==
=== Works cited ===
- Murao, Tatsuya (May 11, 2024). 原孟俊 羽生結弦を語る:極私的RE_PRAY考察 [Taketoshi Hara talking about Yuzuru Hanyu: Very personal RE_PRAY recap]. Quadruple Axel (in Japanese). Chiyoda, Tokyo: Yama-kei. pp. 88–91. ISBN 978-4635907859.
- Repray Official (April 30, 2024). Yuzuru Hanyu Ice Story 2nd 'RE_PRAY' Official Player's Guide (in Japanese). Shibuya, Tokyo: Axel Entermedia Co., Ltd. ID 107.
- Russell, Susan D. (September 6, 2022). "Yuzuru Hanyu – An icon leaves the competitive stage". International Figure Skating. Denville Township, New Jersey. pp. 22–33. IFSISS22-05.
