= Telasa =

Japanese streaming service

Telasa Corporation
- Logo since 2020
- Company type: OTT video streaming platform
- Available in: Japanese; English
- Headquarters: Pacific Capital Plaza, 4-8-6 Roppongi, Minato-ku, Tokyo, {{{location_country}}}
- Owners: KDDI (50%); TV Asahi (50%)
- Key people: Takashi Kamiyama (President)
- Website: telasa.jp
- Registration: Required
- Launched: May 15, 2012; 14 years ago (as Video Pass); April 4, 2020; 6 years ago (as Telasa)

Telasa (テラサ, Terasa) is a Japanese subscription over-the-top video streaming service operated by Telasa Corporation, a joint venture between KDDI and TV Asahi. Originally launched by KDDI in May 2012 as Video Pass, the platform was rebranded to its current name in April 2020 following the establishment of the joint venture. The service primarily offers Japanese television programs, films, and original content, leveraging TV Asahi's production capabilities and KDDI's telecommunications infrastructure.

== History ==
=== 2012–2014: Launch of Video Pass and Early Development ===
Prior to the launch of Video Pass, KDDI provided a video service called Lismo Video, which faced difficulties gaining traction during the feature phone era. As the market shifted toward smartphones and multi-device streaming, KDDI restructured its video distribution strategy.

The logo for Video Pass

Video Pass was officially launched on May 15, 2012. At its inception, the service was priced at ¥590 per month, offering a hybrid subscription model that included unlimited streaming of older catalog titles and one monthly rental ticket for newer releases. Users could also rent additional titles on an a-la-carte basis. The service was introduced as part of KDDI's broader 3M Strategy (Multi-device, Multi-network, Multi-use) and was closely tied to the Au ID account system. KDDI integrated Video Pass with its app subscription service, Au Smart Pass, offering a two-week free trial of the video platform to Smart Pass members to drive initial adoption.

At launch, Video Pass was solely compatible with au Android smartphones running Android 2.3 or later. Furthermore, the service was not carrier-free; it was strictly an exclusive service for Au subscribers and could not be used by customers of other mobile carriers. KDDI gradually expanded device support, adding compatibility for PCs in June 2012, tablet devices in July 2012, and eventually integrating with Android-equipped set-top boxes.

To build and expand its content library, the Video Pass division used KDDI's corporate group relationship with Jupiter Telecommunications (Jcom), a cable television company. Jcom's subsidiary, Asmik Ace—which handled film production, distribution, and video-on-demand content procurement for cable television—provided its acquisition channels and industry expertise. Through joint content procurement with Jcom and Asmik Ace, KDDI secured titles for the platform.

Shortly after its launch, KDDI began investing in original programming to differentiate the service from competitors. In May 2012, KDDI announced a co-production with Jcom and Asmik Ace. The project, a three-part short drama series based on Keigo Higashino's work, premiered in August 2012 and marked a shift from relying solely on the secondary distribution of broadcast content.

By early 2014, Video Pass had grown to an estimated several million regular users. In May 2014, KDDI rolled out a major user interface update to accommodate varied viewing habits. The redesign introduced a feature allowing users to search for content based on playback duration and integrated third-party user reviews through a partnership with the social movie service Filmarks. The update also created a clearer visual separation between the unlimited streaming catalog—which had grown to approximately 1,000 titles—and the pay-per-view rental library of nearly 3,000 titles. Additionally, the service added support for Google Chromecast.

As the video-on-demand market expanded, KDDI began segmenting its content offerings. In June 2014, KDDI launched a separate, specialized subscription service called Anime Pass in collaboration with Kadokawa. While Video Pass retained family-oriented anime titles, Anime Pass was designed specifically for late-night and enthusiast anime.

Despite the expansion of features and services, KDDI maintained its strategy of keeping Video Pass strictly exclusive to au mobile subscribers. The company stated that avoiding a carrier-free model was a deliberate choice to differentiate its services amid the increasing commoditization of smartphone hardware.

=== 2015–2018: Content Expansion and Carrier-Free Access ===
Throughout 2014 and 2015, KDDI aggressively expanded the Video Pass content library, with a particular focus on domestic Japanese titles, responding to user demand. By August 2014, the platform increased its Japanese film catalog from roughly 280 to over 1,000 titles. KDDI also formed a partnership with TV Tokyo to distribute daily segments of the late-night business news program World Business Satellite on the morning after broadcast, catering to users who missed the live airing.

To bridge its online platform with offline experiences, KDDI introduced cinema discount programs. In October 2014, the company launched Au Monday, offering discounted movie tickets at Toho Cinemas nationwide for Video Pass and Smart Pass members. This was followed by a similar year-round cinema discount benefit introduced for Video Pass subscribers in December 2014.

In mid-2015, KDDI officially announced that Video Pass had reached approximately one million subscribers. During this period of growth, KDDI also announced a migration of its backend infrastructure, transitioning the Video Pass distribution platform to the KKBOX system—which the company was already using for its music services—to build an integrated media distribution infrastructure for the Asian market. However, the service's subscriber growth lagged behind its domestic competitors. This was during a time when NTT Docomo's dTV had surpassed 4.5 million subscribers, and SoftBank's Uula had reached approximately 1.6 million.

Driven by this competitive pressure, a major shift in content strategy occurred on August 20, 2015, when KDDI announced a comprehensive business partnership with TV Asahi. This collaboration was designed to co-produce original programming and distribute terrestrial broadcasts using a data-driven approach. As a first step, Video Pass became the exclusive subscription video-on-demand (SVOD) service to stream TV Asahi dramas and variety shows immediately following their television broadcasts. A defining feature of this partnership was the utilization of KDDI's telecom big data to inform television production. By analyzing user viewing histories, search data, and specific drop-off points, combined with approximately 2,000 types of metadata (such as emotional tone and content characteristics) provided by Sockets Inc., creators could optimize episode runtimes and narrative pacing. The first project to emerge from this data-driven strategy was an original horror drama starring AKB48 group members, produced by Yasushi Akimoto, which premiered in October 2015. The project featured terrestrial television episodes alongside exclusive alternate-story episodes produced specifically for Video Pass.

Amid an increasingly competitive SVOD market with the entry of global platforms like Netflix and the upcoming launch of the free catch-up service TVer by commercial broadcasters, KDDI and TV Asahi positioned Video Pass as a distinct offering. They differentiated the service from TVer by emphasizing Video Pass as a stacking archive of episodes rather than a temporary one-week catch-up service. KDDI cited its head start in the subscription market and its data-driven production capabilities as key competitive advantages. Despite these expansions, KDDI maintained its strict requirement for an Au ID, ensuring the platform remained exclusive to au subscribers.

In January 2016, KDDI announced the closure of Anime Pass, which officially shut down on April 30, 2016. To consolidate its video distribution services, KDDI shifted its focus to expanding the anime catalog within the primary Video Pass platform. At the time, anime was already the most viewed genre on Video Pass. To absorb the demand following the closure of Anime Pass, Video Pass more than doubled its catch-up streaming of late-night television anime titles and added popular manga adaptations targeting younger demographics.

In early 2017, Video Pass expanded its content offerings to include live event streaming. In April 2017, the platform live-streamed a stage event from "Umatsuri," a festival hosted by the creator management company UUUM. Notably, KDDI made this specific live stream available for free via the Video Pass app to all users, including non-au subscribers and those without registered accounts. The following month, the platform entered the K-pop space by providing free live streams of the convention stages at "KCON 2017 JAPAN," along with a delayed broadcast of the main concert event.

Following its initial focus on smartphones and PCs, KDDI steadily expanded Video Pass access to living room and smart home devices. In November 2016, a dedicated app was released for the Apple TV. This was followed by an app for Android TV-equipped Sony BRAVIA televisions in December 2017. In April 2018, the platform integrated with Google Home smart speakers, allowing users to control video playback on their televisions using voice commands. In August 2018, KDDI made a major strategic shift by opening Video Pass to non-au subscribers, making the service carrier-free. Users from other mobile networks could access the platform by registering for a free Wow! ID. KDDI President Makoto Takahashi stated that transitioning away from a strictly vertically integrated model was a deliberate step to expand the platform's reach. Contrasting KDDI's approach with competitor NTT Docomo—which opened its video service, dTV, to non-subscribers while retaining its distinct "d" branding—Takahashi noted that KDDI intentionally excluded the "Au" brand from its "Pass" services. This was part of a broader strategy to appeal more naturally to a wider audience outside of its existing mobile subscriber base.

=== 2019–2020: Joint Venture and Rebranding to Telasa ===
In late 2019, anticipating the rollout of 5G networks, KDDI and TV Asahi announced the establishment of a joint venture to operate a subscription video-on-demand service. On December 11, 2019, KDDI established a preparatory company—which would later become Telasa Corporation—and transferred the Video Pass operations to it. On March 2, 2020, KDDI transferred 50% of this company's shares to TV Asahi, finalizing a 50-50 joint venture structure with a capital of ¥50 million.

On April 7, 2020, Video Pass was officially rebranded as Telasa. The launch was timed to coincide with KDDI's introduction of commercial 5G services in late March. It also occurred during the onset of the COVID-19 pandemic, which disrupted television production but simultaneously drove record-high viewership across streaming platforms due to stay-at-home demand. The new name combines Tel (representing Telecommunications and Television) with Asa (for morning). Furthermore, the name Telasa serves as a deliberate phonetic play on Tere-Asa, the common Japanese abbreviation for TV Asahi.

The creation of Telasa marked TV Asahi's full-scale entry into the SVOD market and was a strategic response to rival Japanese broadcasters solidifying their own streaming platforms; at the time, Nippon TV operated Hulu Japan, TBS and TV Tokyo co-owned Paravi, and public broadcaster NHK had recently launched its catch-up service, NHK Plus. Internally, TV Asahi positioned the subscription-based Telasa to coexist with its other streaming venture, AbemaTV (co-owned with CyberAgent), noting that AbemaTV primarily targeted younger audiences and offered a different viewing experience.

With the transition to Telasa, the platform significantly expanded its catalog of TV Asahi programming, introducing catch-up distribution for currently airing dramas and variety shows, alongside past popular series. The monthly subscription fee remained unchanged at ¥562 (excluding tax), and existing Video Pass members were automatically transitioned to the new service. The platform retained its carrier-free accessibility and multi-device support, including offline download capabilities. However, the theater discount benefit previously offered under Video Pass was discontinued on March 31, 2020. Additionally, Telasa integrated with other KDDI services, allowing Au Smart Pass Premium members access to a select subset of videos and bundling the SVOD subscription into specific high-tier 5G data plans.

=== 2021–Present: Original Programming and Multi-Platform Strategy ===
In early 2021, Telasa began producing exclusive content to improve its market position. On February 26, 2021, the platform released its first original series, Shufu Maison, co-produced with TV Asahi and Media Mix Japan. Concurrently, KDDI entered the independent film distribution business to secure exclusive streaming rights and flexible release windows. In April 2021, KDDI acted as the sole distributor for the film Funny Bunny, releasing it simultaneously in theaters and on its SVOD platforms. These content investments aimed to increase Telasa's competitiveness in the domestic market, where its 2.9% share in 2020 lagged behind rivals like NTT Docomo's dTV (6.5%). In 2022, KDDI established KDDI Pictures and began full-scale film production and distribution.

In early 2024, Telasa began expanding its reach by integrating its content into third-party streaming platforms. On February 22, 2024, the service launched Telasa for Prime Video as an add-on channel for Amazon Prime members. This distribution strategy continued the following year through a partnership with Jcom), making Telasa content available on the Jcom Stream service starting March 1, 2025.

Driven by this expanded distribution network and an increased focus on platform-exclusive content—including terrestrial drama spin-offs, exclusive sports broadcasts, and enhanced anime programming—Telasa surpassed two million subscribers by March 2025. Despite the subscriber growth and maintaining overall profitability as a core SVOD service, the company's financial results for the fiscal year ending March 2025 (its sixth term) showed a significant 80.6% year-over-year decrease in net profit, falling to 195 million yen from the previous year's ¥1.009 billion.

On February 27, 2025, Telasa announced a major renewal of its unlimited streaming plan, accompanied by a price increase. Effective March 1, 2025, the monthly subscription fee was raised from ¥618 to ¥990.

== Service and Features ==
Telasa operates on a hybrid revenue model. The core offering is a flat-rate monthly subscription plan that provides unlimited streaming of catalog titles. In addition, the platform features a pay-per-view rental system (a-la-carte) for newer theatrical releases and specific premium content. Users who subscribe to the unlimited plan receive monthly Video Coins, a digital currency that can be applied toward these rental purchases.

The service is carrier-free, meaning it is accessible to users across all mobile networks via the registration of an Au ID. It supports multi-device viewing, including smartphones, tablets, personal computers, and smart TVs (including Android TV, Apple TV, and Chromecast integrations). Mobile applications also include an offline download feature, allowing users to save content for viewing without an active internet connection.

== Content ==
Telasa's content library is heavily integrated with TV Asahi's broadcasting schedule, providing catch-up distribution for currently airing programs immediately following their terrestrial broadcast. The platform features an extensive archive of TV Asahi's flagship drama series, including Aibou: Tokyo Detective Duo, The Woman of S.R.I. (Kasouken no Onna), Doctor-X: Surgeon Michiko Daimon, and Emergency Interrogation Room (Kinkyu Torishirabeshitsu). It also offers numerous adaptations of Seicho Matsumoto's works, as well as classic and special dramas such as Maguro and Seibu Keisatsu Special.

The service caters to children and family audiences with a lineup of anime and tokusatsu (special effects) series, including Doraemon, Crayon Shin-chan, the Super Sentai series, the Kamen Rider series, and the Pretty Cure franchise. Furthermore, leveraging KDDI group synergies, Telasa offers a diverse selection of Japanese films through a partnership with Jcom.

To differentiate itself in the SVOD market, Telasa produces platform-exclusive content. This includes exclusive spin-off dramas based on popular TV Asahi terrestrial series and director's cut versions of various programs. The platform also streams exclusive live sports events and maintains a dedicated catalog of Asian programming, including K-pop content and Thai dramas.

Beyond its standalone application, Telasa content is distributed through third-party platforms, functioning as a premium add-on channel on Amazon Prime Video (Telasafor Prime Video) and Jcom Stream.
