= Elevenplay =

Japanese dance troupe

General information
- Name: Elevenplay
- Website: elevenplay.net

Senior staff
- Director: Mikiko

Elevenplay is a Japanese dance troupe noted for their incorporation of advanced technologies into their works. It is headed by director and principal choreographer Mikiko.

== Overview ==
The name Elevenplay comes from the fact that Mikiko and Tomomi Yoshimura used to be in a four-member dance team in which all the members had the number eleven in their birthdays. Continuing with the theme of eleven, the troupe's first performance was on November 11, 2011.

In 2015, Elevenplay collaborated with Rhizomatiks to produce a piece called Shadow, which used three drones, a spotlight, and a dancer. Elevenplay worked with Rhizomatiks again to produce the show Pulse for the Festival Internacional Cervantino in Mexico. The piece made use of projection-mapping, both on the background and on the dancers. They also collaborated individually with Rhizomatiks director Daito Manabe to create a technology-enhanced show called Drone-Augmented Amazingness, which used three drones and a projection-mapped backdrop. In the piece, the dancers direct the drones at first, but by the end, the drones replace the dancers.

The members of Elevenplay have choreographed for many artists, such as @onefive and Passcode.

== Members ==
- Kohmen
- Saya Shinohara
- Emi Tamura
- Yu Tokutake
- Non
- Minako Maruyama
- Kaori Yasukawa
- Erisa Wakisaka
- Shoko Akiyama

=== Former members ===
- Tomo (Tomomi Yoshimura) - choreographer and dancer
- Arisa Iwasawa
- Saori Oodan
- Nanako Sudo
- Kazune Tomita
- Aayane Nakamoto
- Mayumi Niwa
- Yuka Numata
- Nozomi Hiramoto/Okamoto
- Asami Horiko
- Konomi Masuda
- Mariko Yoshino
- Mai Kuremoto
