= Phiten =

Japanese company

- Founded: 4 October 1983
- Founder: Yoshihiro Hirata, President and Representative Director
- Headquarters: 678 Tearimizu-cho, Nishikikoji kado, Karasuma-dori, Nakagyo-ku, Kyoto, Japan 604-8152
- Products: Manufacture and sale of sports, health and beauty products
- Revenue: 14,610 million yen (fiscal 2008)
- Number of employees: 680
- Website: www.phiten.com/english/, phitensg.com

Phiten is a Japanese company, headquartered in Nakagyo-ku, Kyoto, that sells quasi-drugs, cosmetics, hair care products, sports-related products, health foods, and health goods.

== Overview ==
AQUA TITAN/AQUA-TITANIUM products worn as necklaces (such as RAKUWA Neck) are well known and used by many famous athletes. Some of the athletes who have made endorsement agreements with Phiten are Yuzuru Hanyu, Hideki Matsuyama,Tomoaki Kanemoto, Yoshio Itoi, Yoshihiro Maru, Tetsuto Yamada, Daichi Osera, Katsuya Kakunaka, Sora Matsushima, Hina Hayata and Hikari Fujita. Athletes who have signed agreements with Phiten in the past include Daisuke Matsuzaka, Yu Darvish, Yukari Baba, Shintaro Fujinami, Yasuyuki Kataoka, Toshiaki Imae, Yuki Saito, Kengo Nakamura, Tsuyoshi Shinjo, Shinnosuke Abe, Shingo Katayama, Randy Johnson, Paula Radcliffe and Naoko Takahashi.

The company makes endorsement agreements exclusively with athletes who need and enjoy Phiten products.

The company also develops and sells sportswear, although the variety and production numbers are very small. The company is also involved in the development of health food products with functional claims.

In 2007, it became the first Japanese company to sign the MLB/Major League Baseball Authentication Program.

== Aqua Metal ==
There is still a lack of scientific evidence to support the efficacy of Aqua Titan/Aqua-Titanium, and there has been criticism that Aqua Titan/Aqua-Titanium is nothing more than a placebo effect or a pseudo-science. In 2009, Biomarker Science, Inc. published the results of experiments conducted by Kyoto Prefectural University of Medicine, Kyoto Prefectural University, University of California, Los Angeles/UCLA and Professor Martin Corte at Technical University of Braunschweig, which showed that Aqua Titan/Aqua-Titanium material had a certain relaxing effect. In 2013, Professor Toshikazu Yoshikawa of Kyoto Prefectural University of Medicine, who has supported Aqua Titan/Aqua-Titanium research, published a hypothesis that Aqua Titan/Aqua-Titanium may have a balancing effect on the autonomic nervous system.

== Scientific testing of product ==
Instructors at the United States Air Force Academy conducted a double-blind study of the Phiten claim. Initially the instructors became interested in this product because of the company's claims that it could cause relaxation, maximize strength and energy. When looking into the product before testing they flagged several concerns; Most studies supporting Phiten were also funded by Phiten. The claims sound like the definition of pseudoscience with no mechanism to show how it could work and the claims are unfalsifiable. The packaging claims that '"not all users will experience the intended benefits."' Leaving the user to believe that it will work or it will not work. Also the instructors felt that the Phiten product was similar to other pseudoscientific medical accessories like copper bracelets, crystals and magnetic bands.

Forty-eight Academy cadets wore a tape-covered necklace for 48-hours, half were necklaces purchased from the Phiten website and the other half were clothesline purchased from The Home Depot. All necklaces were the same length and wrapped in masking tape. The cadets selected a necklace from a bin and they and the instructors did not know who wore a clothesline and who wore a Phiten necklace. At the end of the 48-hours each cadet was asked to fill out a survey rating from one to nine, if they felt relaxed, angry or energized? The conclusion was that there was no "statistically significant difference" between the clothesline and the Phiten necklace.

Furthermore, the instructors procured soil samples from a baseball field and analyzed the results checking for titanium. They also asked the Phiten company what the weight percent of titanium is in their necklaces, but were told it is a "corporate secret". The academy instructors learned that titanium was plentiful in the soil samples, and also learned that titanium is "the ninth most-abundant element on the planet". This led the instructors to state that baseball players "are purchasing Phiten necklaces to receive the purported benefits... when they are routinely performing... on playing fields that contain titanium."
