= Ice show =

Entertainment performed by ice skaters

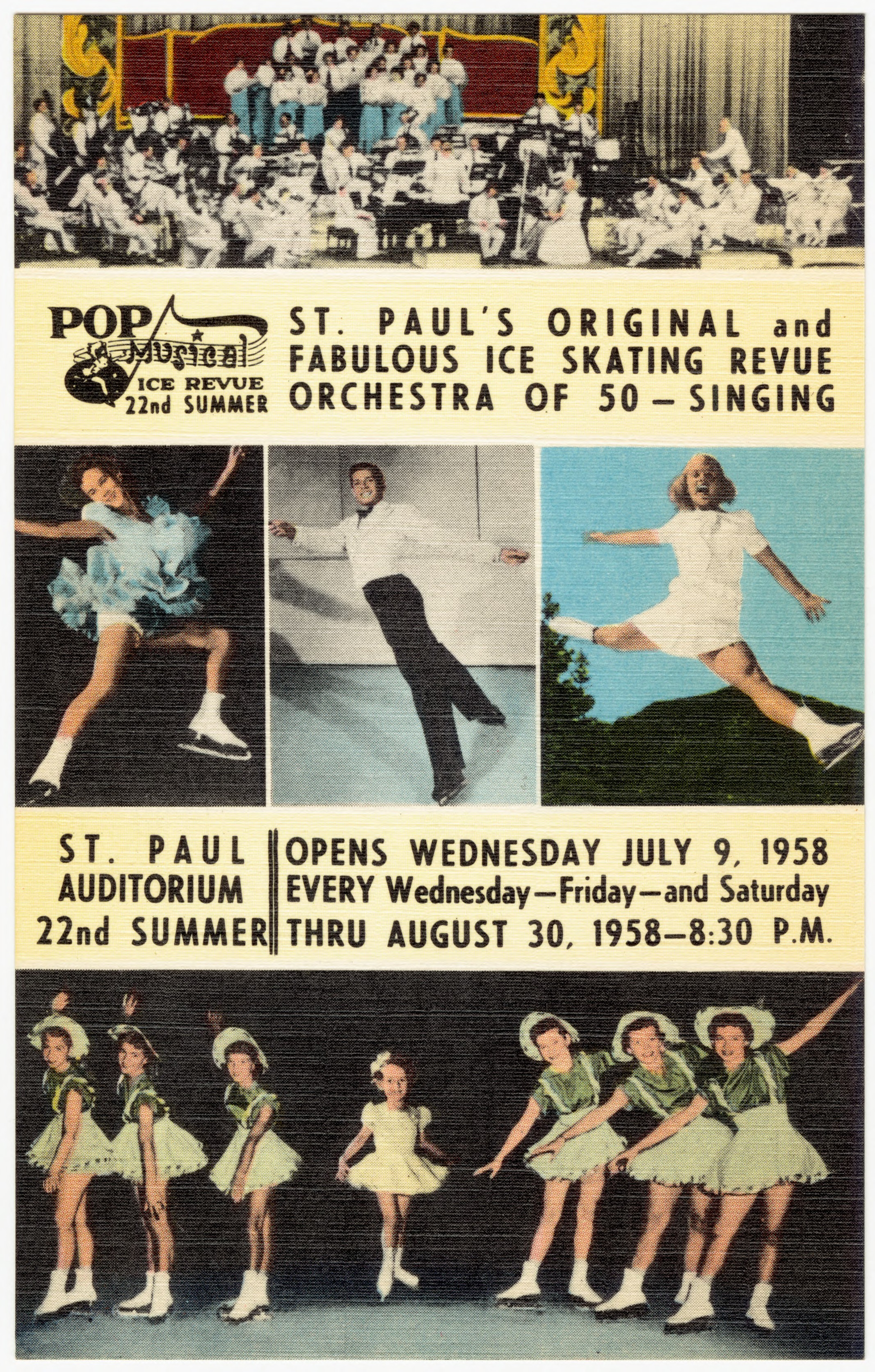
Postcard from Pop Musical Ice Revue, 1958

An ice show is an entertainment production which is primarily performed by ice skaters. The major ice shows were founded between 1936 and 1943, when professional figure skaters began to appear in shows, in hotels, at fairs, and "at any place a sheet of ice could be set up" since the beginning of the 20th century in North America and Europe. They were produced and toured North America, Europe, and throughout the world for many years in the years following World War II. According to figure skating historian James R. Hines, ice shows "took spectacular skating to large audiences, contributing to the development of the sport's first major fan base".

Such shows may primarily be skating exhibitions, or may be musical and/or dramatic in nature, using skating as a medium in order to accompany a musical work or to present a story. The term generally excludes skating competitions in (professional) sports. Many companies produce fixed or touring ice shows, which are then performed for the general public in facilities such as multipurpose arenas or skating rinks which can accommodate spectators, or in theatres with a temporary ice surface installed on the stage. Ice shows are also featured as entertainment in amusement parks and on some large cruise ships.

== Notable major ice shows ==
- Four shows began in the years prior to World War II in the U.S.: the Ice Follies (1936), the Hollywood Ice Review (1937), the Ice Capades (1941), and Holiday on Ice (1943).
- Broadway on Ice is an ice-based revue of Broadway show tunes.
- Disney on Ice produces ice shows, primarily geared towards children, based on Disney films and characters.
- Holiday on Ice is a musical ice show which primarily performs in Europe and South America.
- Champions on Ice, Stars on Ice, Fantasy on Ice, Art on Ice, Prince Ice World, The Ice, and Ice Explosion are touring ice shows which focus on skating exhibitions, featuring elite competitive skaters.
- Dreams on Ice is an annual ice show in Yokohama, Japan, featuring national senior and junior skaters as well as international guests.
- All That Skate is a show in Seoul, South Korea, produced by All That Sports (AT Sports), a sports agency founded by 2010 Olympic champion Yuna Kim and her mother Park Mi-hee.
- With Prologue (2022) and Gift (2023), two-time Olympic champion Yuzuru Hanyu from Japan challenged the concept of a solo ice show format for the first time, with him as the only scheduled skater. Prologue was awarded the Grand Prize in the category "relay broadcast" at the 13th JSBA Original Programs Awards. Gift was the first skating event ever held at the Tokyo Dome, in the presence of 35,000 spectators and streamed worldwide. Hanyu's Repray Tour (2023–24) was the first solo ice show tour in figure skating.
- Friends on Ice is an annual ice show in Japan produced by 2006 Olympic champion Shizuka Arakawa.
- Revolution On Ice is a show in Spain produced by two-time world champion Javier Fernández of Spain.
- Bol On Ice is an annual ice show that takes place in early January in Unipol Arena in Bologna, Italy.
- One Piece on Ice is a Japanese ice show inspired by Eichiro Oda's manga series One Piece.

== Other notable ice shows ==
- Ice Chips is Skating Club of Boston's annual show held in Boston, Massachusetts. Originating in 1912, it is the longest running club-produced show in the world.
- Sun Valley on Ice is an annual Saturday night ice show created in 1937 that takes place every summer under the stars at the outdoor rink at Sun Valley Resort in Sun Valley, Idaho.
- An Evening with Champions is an annual benefit ice show organized by students of Harvard University.
- Scott Hamilton and Friends is an annual charity show that takes place in Nashville, Tennessee, benefiting Scott Hamiton's CARES Foundation to fund cancer research. The event showcases country music stars performing live alongside figure skating stars.
- Legacy on Ice was a one-off benefit show in honor of the victims of the 2025 Potomac River mid-air collision and crash in which 28 members of the figure skating community lost their lives.
