= Ten to chi to =

Ten to chi to (天と地と, lit. Heaven and earth and [humanity]) is the Japanese counterpart of the concept Tiāndìrén (天地人, lit. Heaven–earth–human) in Chinese theology.

Ten to chi to may also refer to:

- Heaven and Earth (1990 film), also called Ten to Chi to (天と地と), a Japanese samurai film
- Ten to Chi to (TV series), seventh edition of the Japanese taiga drama television series
- Heaven and Earth (figure skating program), also called Ten to Chi to (天と地と), by Japanese figure skater Yuzuru Hanyu
