= Keiichi =

- Gender: Male

Origin
- Origin: Japanese
- Meaning: Different meanings depending on the kanji used

Keiichi is a masculine Japanese given name. Notable people with the name include:

- Keiichi Akimoto (秋元 啓一; 1930–1979), Japanese photographer
- Keiichi Arawi (あらゐけいいち; born 1977), Japanese manga artist
- Keiichi Hayashi (林 景一; born 1951), Japanese diplomat
- Keiichi Ishizaka (石坂 敬一; 1945 – 2016), Japanese music director
- Keiichi Itakura (板倉 啓壹; born 1942), Japanese molecular biologist
- Keiichi Kawanaka (川中 恵一; born 1973), Japanese butterfly swimmer
- Keiichi Kimura (photographer) (木村 恵一; born 1935), Japanese photographer
- Keiichi Kimura (swimmer) (木村 敬一; born 1990), Japanese Paralympic swimmer
- Keiichi Nanba (難波 圭一; born 1957), Japanese voice actor
- Keiichi Kuwabara (桑原 敬一; born 1980), Japanese voice actor
- Keiichi Noda (野田 圭一; born 1943), Japanese voice actor
- Keiichi Nozaki (野崎 圭一; born 1961), Japanese music producer
- Keiichi Okabe (岡部 啓一; born 1969), Japanese music composer
- Keiichi Ozawa (小澤 啓一; born 1933), Japanese film director
- Keiichi Sanada (真田 圭一; born 1972), Japanese shogi player
- Keiichi Sigsawa (時雨沢 恵一; born 1972), Japanese light novel author
- Keiichi Sonobe (園部 啓一; born 1960), Japanese voice actor
- Keiichi Suzuki (composer) (鈴木 慶一; born 1951), Japanese music composer
- Keiichi Suzuki (speed skater) (鈴木 惠一; 1942–2025), Japanese speed skater
- Keiichi Tanaami (田名網 敬一; 1936-2024), Japanese artist
- Keiichi Tsuchiya (土屋 圭市; born 1956), also known as the Drift King, Japanese racing driver
- Keiichi Yano (矢野 慶一), Japanese video game designer
- Keiichi Yano (sound designer) (矢野 桂一; born 1957), Japanese sound designer

== Fictional characters ==
- Keiichi Maebara (前原 圭一), a character in the sound novel Higurashi no Naku Koro ni
- Keiichi Morisato (森里 螢一), a character in the manga series Oh My Goddess!
- Keiichi Sumi (角 圭一), a character in the manga series Junjo Romantica
- Keiichi Kuzuryu (九頭龍 慧一), a character in the manga series Imawa No Kuni No Alice
