= Keiichi Kimura =

Keiichi Kimura may refer to:

- Keiichi Kimura (photographer) (木村 恵一, born 1935), Japanese photographer
- Keiichi Kimura (swimmer) (木村 敬一, born 1990), Japanese Paralympic swimmer
