= Keiichi Yano =

Keiichi Yano may refer to:

- Keiichi Yano (video game designer), video game designer and musician
- Keiichi Yano (sound designer) (born 1957), Japanese sound designer and music programmer
