= Keiichi Suzuki (disambiguation) =

Keiichi Suzuki (鈴木 慶一, born 1951) is a Japanese musician and composer.

Keiichi Suzuki may also refer to:

- Keiichi Suzuki (speed skater) (鈴木 惠一, 1942–2025), Japanese speed skater
- Keiichi Suzuki (racing driver) (鈴木恵一, born 1949), Japanese racing driver
- Keiichi Suzuki (politician) (鈴木 敬一, 1889–1973), Japanese governor of Hiroshima

== See also ==
- Keiichi
- Suzuki (disambiguation)
