= Yuzuru Hanyu bibliography =

Japanese figure skater

Yuzuru Hanyu
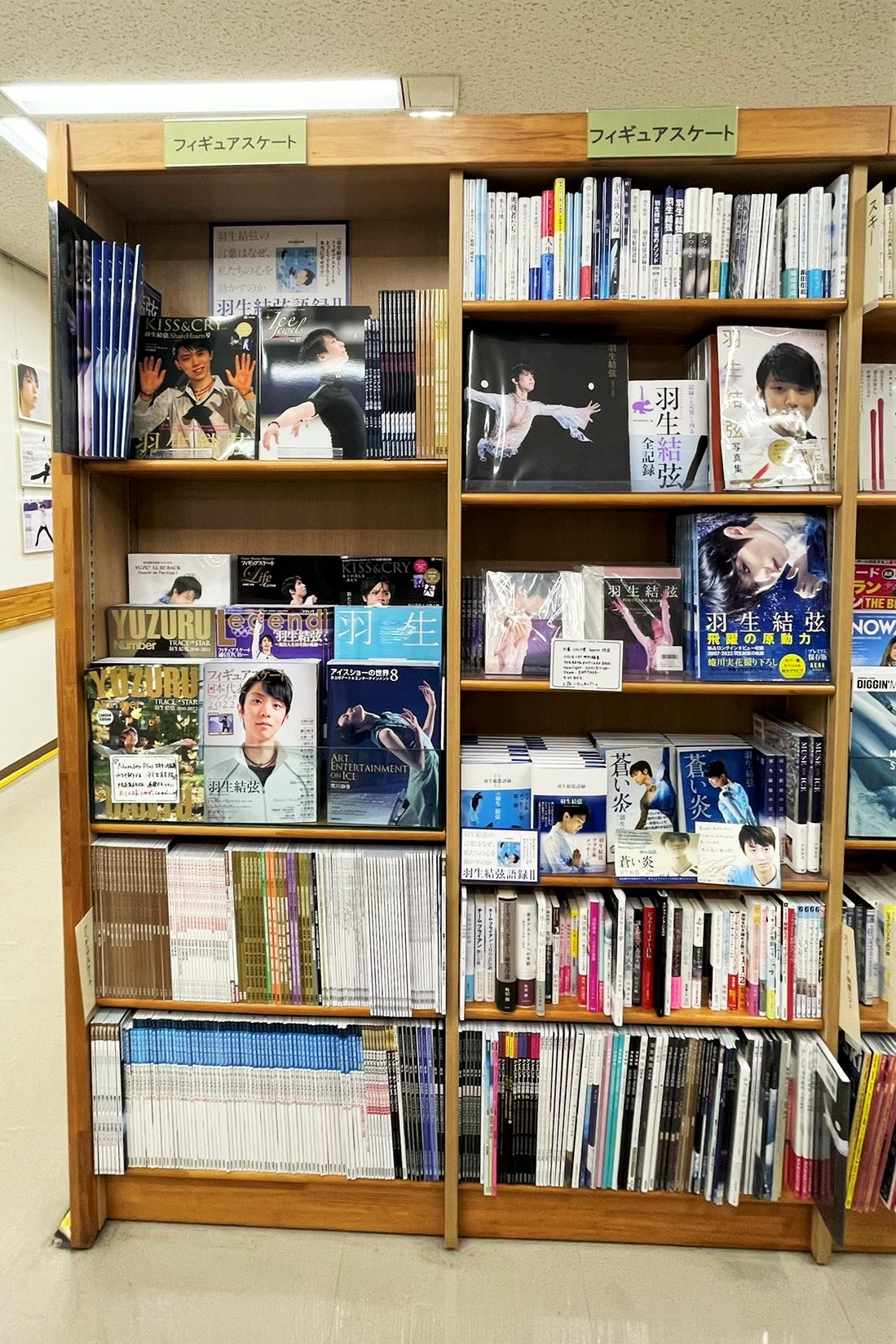
- Print works of Yuzuru Hanyu at the Junkudo bookshop in Ikebukuro, Tokyo, in 2022

Yuzuru Hanyu article series
- Skating career: Olympic seasons; Career achievements; Figure skating programs
- Other works: Bibliography
- Solo ice shows: Prologue; Gift; Repray Tour; Echoes of Life Tour; Realive; White Box Tour
- Ensemble ice shows: Fantasy on Ice; Continues with Wings; Yuzuru Hanyu Notte Stellata

Japanese figure skater and two-time Olympic champion Yuzuru Hanyu has written a best-selling autobiography series titled Blue Flames (蒼い炎, Aoi Honō) that consists of four volumes and has been sold with over 400,000 copies by June 2023. All royalties of the series were donated to his local skating rink, Ice Rink Sendai, which had been severely damaged during the 2011 Tōhoku earthquake and tsunami. In 2023, Hanyu also wrote a picture book titled Gift with illustrations by the famous mangaka group Clamp. The story was based on his own solo ice show production Gift, which was held at Tokyo Dome the same year. In 2024, Hanyu wrote the Echoes of Life Storybook, an original work published in Japanese and English that served as the basis for the production of Yuzuru Hanyu Ice Story 3rd Echoes of Life Tour. In 2026, Hanyu co-authored The Power to 'Live' book with Ryojun Shionuma, a Grand Ajari, based on their dialogue for Kateigaho magazine.

Since his victory at the 2014 Winter Olympics, Hanyu has collaborated with renowned sports writers and photographers in Japan, publishing various compilation and photo books, of which multiple ones have made it to the Oricon top 10 charts of best-selling books. The photo book y with pictures from Hanyu's first professional figure skating season, published by Sports Nippon in February 2024, was awarded the Silver Award at the international 2025 Graphis Design Awards.

In 2020, Hanyu's graduation thesis about the utilization of a "wireless inertia sensor motion capture system" in the sport of figure skating was published in the Journal of Human Sciences at Waseda University. The thesis has been retrieved more than 100,000 times from the university's online repository.

== Blue Flames autobiography series ==
Blue Flames (蒼い炎, Aoi Honō) is a best-selling autobiography series by Japanese figure skater and ice show producer Yuzuru Hanyu who competed in the men's singles discipline and turned professional in 2022. Regarded as one of the greatest skaters in the sport's history, he is the first two-time Olympic men's champion in 66 years with back-to-back gold medals at the 2014 and 2018 Winter Olympics, and the first male single skater to complete the Super Slam, having won all major international senior and junior titles in the course of his career. On March 11, 2011, Hanyu experienced the Tōhoku earthquake and tsunami in his hometown of Sendai in Miyagi Prefecture, which fundamentally shaped his life and career. In Blue Flames, he reflected on his skating career and memories of the disaster. The series consists of four volumes, published between 2012 and 2023 by Fusosha and composed in collaboration with Japanese sportswriter Toshimi Oriyama and photographer Keiko Asakura.

In June 2023, the number of sold copies exceeded 400,000 in total, making Blue Flames one of the most successful series of long-selling books in Japan. All royalties and parts of the proceeds were donated for the rebuilding of Ice Rink Sendai, which had been severely damaged during the 2011 Tōhoku earthquake and tsunami. According to The Nikkei, Hanyu donated a cumulative total of ¥87,330,406 (US$686,000) to his local skating rink. Excerpts from the autobiography were quoted by renowned international news outlets, such as The New York Times and the Time Magazine. In 2020, translations of the first two volumes were published in Vietnam, China, and Taiwan. In Japan, Blue Flames III was also distributed as a limited edition with an alternative cover. On July 6, 2023, a special collector's box including all four volumes was released by Fusosha.

Blue Flames autobiography series
| Date | Title | Publisher | P. | Identifiers | Notes | Ref. |
|---|---|---|---|---|---|---|
| Apr 7, 2012 | Blue Flames (蒼い炎, Aoi Honō) | Fusosha | 167 | ISBN 978-4594065980 | Summary of Hanyu's life and skating career until the 2011 Tōhoku earthquake and tsunami | |
| Jul 2, 2016 | Blue Flames II (蒼い炎 II) | Fusosha | 282 | ISBN 978-4594075132 | First Olympic title in 2014 and back-to-back world records in 2015 | |
| Feb 2, 2023 | Blue Flames III (蒼い炎 III) | Fusosha | 304 | ISBN 978-4594093952 | Second Olympic title in 2018 and completion of the first Super Slam in men's singles in 2020 | |
| Apr 30, 2023 | Blue Flames IV (蒼い炎 IV) | Fusosha | 304 | ISBN 978-4594094560 | Third Winter Olympics in 2022 and launch of professional skating career, featuring solo ice shows Prologue and Gift | |

== Picture books ==
Picture books
| Date | Title | Illustrations | Publisher | P. | Identifiers | Notes | Ref. |
|---|---|---|---|---|---|---|---|
| Dec 20, 2023 | Gift | Clamp | Kodansha | 64 | ISBN 978-4065318980 | Picture book based on Hanyu's solo ice show Gift at Tokyo Dome in 2023 | |

== Compilations and photo books ==
Compilation books
| Date | Title | Publisher | P. | Identifiers | Notes | Ref. |
|---|---|---|---|---|---|---|
| Sep 25, 2015 | Yuzuru Hanyu Sayings (羽生結弦 語録) | Pia | 167 | ISBN 978-4835628486 | Compilation of notable quotes by Hanyu until 2015 | |
| Mar 1, 2018 | Living a Dream (夢を生きる) | Chuokoron-Shinsha | 232 | ISBN 978-4120050497 | Compilation of interviews from Ice Jewels vol. 1–7 from 2015 to 2018, with an exclusive interview and afterword from Hanyu | |
| Oct 26, 2020 | Yuzuru Hanyu's Words: There is a light that can only be seen because it is pitch black (羽生結弦の言葉: 真っ暗だからこそ見える光がある) | Takarajimasha | 256 | ISBN 978-4800298317 | Compilation of notable quotes by Hanyu from 2010 to 2020, with photos by Sunao Noto | |
| Oct 26, 2021 | Yuzuru Hanyu: Creating the Future (羽生結弦 未来をつくる) | Shueisha | 264 | ISBN 978-4087900576 | Interview compilation of Hanyu's senior skating career until 2021, published by Japanese sports writer Toshimi Oriyama with Hanyu as co-author | |
| Oct 30, 2021 | Together, forward: Yuzuru Hanyu's memories of the 10 years since the Great East Japan Earthquake (共に、前へ 羽生結弦 東日本大震災10年の記憶) | Shodensha | 248 | ISBN 978-4396617530 | Record of Hanyu's relationship with the disaster-stricken area in Sendai by Nippon TV's news program News Every. | |
| Oct 3, 2022 | Yuzuru Hanyu Sayings II (羽生結弦 語録 II) | Pia | 192 | ISBN 978-4835646657 | Compilation of notable quotes by Hanyu from 2015 to 2022 | |
| Nov 1, 2022 | Yuzuru Hanyu amateur career complete record (羽生結弦 アマチュア時代 全記録) | CCC Media House | 320 | ISBN 978-4484222233 | Compilation of news articles and photos of Hanyu's full competitive skating career from 2004 to 2022 | |
| December 9, 2026 | Ryojun Shionuma, Grand Ajari, and Yuzuru Hanyu: The Power to 'Live' (塩沼亮潤大阿闍梨 羽生結弦 「生きる」力) | Sekaibunka Holdings | 192 | ISBN 978-4418265176 | A dialogue between Hanyu and Ryojun Shionuma, a Grand Ajari, in which they weave words that give strength to "live". It is based on their dialogue for Kateigaho magazine | |
| May 27, 2027 | To Pooh: Yuzuru Hanyu and Winnie the Pooh Memory Book with a Pooh plush toy in a changeable outfit (プーさんへ 羽生結弦とくまのプーさん メモリーブック きせかえ衣装プーぬいぐるみ付き) | Kodansha | 40 | ISBN 978-4065443392 | The book features Hanyu, who is known to be a fan of Pooh, to commemorate the 100th anniversary of the debut of the original Winnie-the-Pooh | |

Photo books
| Date | Title | Photographer | Publisher | P. | Identifiers | Notes | Ref. |
|---|---|---|---|---|---|---|---|
| Oct 24, 2014 | Yuzuru Hanyu Photo Book (YUZURU 羽生結弦 写真集) | Sunao Noto | Shueisha | 128 | ISBN 978-4087807431 | Photo book tracing Hanyu's competitive career from novice to senior level until the 2014 Winter Olympics | |
| Jul 29, 2016 | Ice Jewels – Yuzuru Hanyu Season Photo Book 2015–2016 | Nobuaki Tanaka | Kazi | 96 | ISBN 978-4807211425 | Photo selection of Hanyu from the 2015–16 figure skating season | |
| Jul 29, 2017 | Ice Jewels – Yuzuru Hanyu Season Photo Book 2016–2017 | Nobuaki Tanaka | Kazi | 96 | ISBN 978-4807211449 | Photo selection of Hanyu from the 2016–17 figure skating season | |
| Apr 27, 2018 | Yuzuru Hanyu: The driving force behind the consecutive victories (羽生結弦 連覇の原動力) | Mika Ninagawa | Asahi Shimbun | 128 | ISBN 978-4023317116 | Full coverage of the 2018 Winter Olympics by the AERA magazine | |
| Jul 14, 2018 | Ice Jewels – Yuzuru Hanyu Season Photo Book 2017–2018 | Nobuaki Tanaka | Kazi | 112 | ISBN 978-4807211470 | Photo selection of Hanyu from the 2017–18 figure skating season | |
| Oct 11, 2018 | Yuzuru Hanyu Soul Program (羽生結弦 魂のプログラム) | Masami Morita; Koichi Nakamura | Shinshokan | 128 | ISBN 978-4403311260 | Photo selection from the 2014 to the 2018 Winter Olympics, including Hanyu's victory parades in Sendai | |
| Oct 15, 2018 | Yuzuru Hanyu Photo Book II (YUZURU II 羽生結弦 写真集) | Sunao Noto | Shueisha | 144 | ISBN 978-4087808544 | Photo book tracing Hanyu's competitive career from the 2014 to the 2018 Winter Olympics | |
| Jun 11, 2019 | Yuzu'll Be Back: Yuzuru Hanyu Photo Book 2018–19 (羽生結弦 写真集 2018–19) | Yoshiki Kogaito; Yutaka Nagakubo | Sports Nippon | 112 | ISBN 978-4910319032 | Photo selection of Hanyu from the 2018–19 figure skating season | |
| Jul 19, 2019 | Ice Jewels – Yuzuru Hanyu Season Photo Book 2018–2019 | Nobuaki Tanaka | Kazi | 128 | ISBN 978-4807211494 | Photo selection of Hanyu from the 2018–19 figure skating season | |
| Jun 1, 2020 | Ice Jewels – Yuzuru Hanyu Season Photo Book 2019–2020 | Nobuaki Tanaka | Kazi | 128 | ISBN 978-4807211524 | Photo selection of Hanyu from the 2019–20 figure skating season | |
| Jun 17, 2020 | Yuzuru Hanyu 2019–2020 Photo Book | Toru Yaguchi | Hochi Shimbun | 164 | ISBN 978-4831901668 | Photo selection of Hanyu from the 2019–20 figure skating season | |
| Jun 19, 2020 | Yuzu'll Be Back II: Yuzuru Hanyu Photo Book 2019–20 (羽生結弦 写真集 2019–20) | Yoshiki Kogaito; Yutaka Nagakubo | Sports Nippon | 144 | ISBN 978-4910319025 | Photo selection of Hanyu from the 2019–20 figure skating season | |
| Mar 11, 2021 | Yuzuru Hanyu Large Photo Book: Be the Light (羽生結弦 大型写真集 光) | Sunao Noto | Shueisha | 192 | ISBN 978-4087900248 | Photo selection of Hanyu's exhibition gala and ice show performances from 2011 to 2020 | |
| May 19, 2021 | Yuzuru Hanyu Photo Book 'The Real': A brave figure in beautiful training gear (羽生結弦 写真集 The Real 美しき練習着の勇姿) | Joe Kobashi; Sunao Noto; Yukihito Taguchi | Yama-kei | 152 | ISBN 978-4635550222 | Photo selection of Hanyu's practice sessions since 2008 with an exclusive interview conducted by the Quadruple Axel magazine | |
| Jun 25, 2021 | Yuzu'll Be Back III: Yuzuru Hanyu Photo Book 2020–21 (羽生結弦 写真集 2020–21) | Yoshiki Kogaito; Yutaka Nagakubo | Sports Nippon | 144 | ISBN 978-4910319032 | Photo selection of Hanyu from the 2020–21 figure skating season | |
| Jul 19, 2021 | Ice Jewels – Yuzuru Hanyu Season Photo Book 2020–2021 | Nobuaki Tanaka | Kazi | 112 | ISBN 978-4807211555 | Photo selection of Hanyu from the 2020–21 figure skating season | |
| Jul 20, 2021 | Yuzuru Hanyu Photobook: Regrowth (羽生結弦 写真集 リグロウス 再生) | Hitoshi Mochizuki; Koichi Nakamura | Kosaido | 150 | ISBN 978-4331523353 | Photo selection of Hanyu from the 2020–21 figure skating season | |
| Jul 6, 2022 | Yuzu'll Be Back IV: Yuzuru Hanyu Photo Book 2021–22 (羽生結弦 写真集 2021–22) | Yoshiki Kogaito; Yutaka Nagakubo; Toshiyuki Kojima | Sports Nippon | 160 | ISBN 978-4910319049 | Photo selection of Hanyu from the 2021–22 figure skating season | |
| Jul 29, 2022 | Yuzuru Hanyu 2021–2022 Photo Book | Toru Yaguchi | Hochi Shimbun | 166 | ISBN 978-4831901736 | Photo selection of Hanyu from the 2021–22 figure skating season | |
| Aug 8, 2022 | Yuzuru Hanyu Photo Book: Endless Dream (羽生結弦 写真集 果てなき夢) | Hitoshi Mochizuki | Kosaido | 150 | ISBN 978-4331523759 | Photo selection of Hanyu from the 2021–22 figure skating season | |
| Aug 8, 2022 | Ice Jewels – Yuzuru Hanyu Season Photo Book 2021–2022 | Nobuaki Tanaka | Kazi | 128 | ISBN 978-4807211586 | Photo selection of Hanyu from the 2021–22 figure skating season | |
| Oct 13, 2022 | Yuzuru Hanyu: The driving force behind the leap (羽生結弦 飛躍の原動力) | Mika Ninagawa | Asahi Shimbun | 128 | ISBN 978-4023322691 | Coverage of Hanyu's quad Axel attempt the 2022 Winter Olympics and move to professional level by the AERA magazine | |
| Dec 7, 2022 | Yuzuru Hanyu Photo Book III (YUZURU III 羽生結弦 写真集) | Sunao Noto | Shueisha | 144 | ISBN 978-4087900934 | Photo book tracing Hanyu's competitive career from the 2018 to the 2022 Winter Olympics | |
| Aug 24, 2023 | Ice Jewels – Yuzuru Hanyu Season Photo Book 2022–2023 | Nobuaki Tanaka | Kazi | 128 | ISBN 978-4807211616 | Photo selection of Hanyu from the 2022–23 season (professional skating) | |
| Aug 26, 2023 | Yuzuru Hanyu Photo Book: Keep Trying (羽生結弦 写真集 挑み続ける) | Hitoshi Mochizuki | Kosaido | 160 | ISBN 978-4331524008 | Photo selection of Hanyu from the 2022–23 season (professional skating) | |
| Nov 11, 2023 | Yuzuru Hanyu: The driving force of solitude (羽生結弦 孤高の原動力) | Mika Ninagawa | Asahi Shimbun | 112 | ISBN 978-4023323506 | Recap of Hanyu's first year as a professional skater by the AERA magazine | |
| Dec 7, 2023 | G.O.A.T 2007–2023 Yuzuru Hanyu Photo Book | Kiyoshi Sakamoto | JTB Publishing | 208 | ISBN 978-4533157172 | Photo selection covering Hanyu's competitive and professional skating career from 2007 to 2023 | |
| Feb 7, 2024 | y – Yuzuru Hanyu Photo Book (羽生結弦 写真集) | Yoshiki Kogaito; Toshiyuki Kojima | Sports Nippon | 128 | ISBN 978-4910319056 | Photo selection of Hanyu's first professional skating season, receiving the Silver Award at the 2025 Graphis Design Awards | |
| July 19, 2024 | Yuzuru Hanyu (羽生結弦) | Toru Yaguchi | Hochi Shimbun | 128 | ISBN 978-4831901811 | Photo selection of Hanyu's first two professional seasons with comments by Megumi Takagi | |

== Scientific works ==
Scientific works
| Date | Title | Journal | Volume | P. | Identifiers | Ref. |
|---|---|---|---|---|---|---|
| Mar 18, 2020 | A Feasibility Study on the Utilization of a Wireless Inertia Sensor Motion Capture System in Figure Skating (無線・慣性センサー式モーションキャプチャシステムのフィギュアスケートでの利活用に関するフィージビリティスタディ) | Waseda University (Faculty of Human Sciences) | 2021 | 1–7 | hdl:2065/00080605 | |

== Notes and references ==
=== Cited works ===
- Russell, Susan D. (September 6, 2022). "Yuzuru Hanyu – An icon leaves the competitive stage". International Figure Skating. Denville Township, New Jersey. pp. 22–33. IFSISS22-05.
