= Satomi Ito =

Japanese costume designer (born 1988)

- 伊藤 聡美
- Born: May 31, 1988 (age 38); Chiba City, Chiba, Japan
- Education: Esmod Japon; Nottingham Trent University
- Occupations: Fashion and costume designer
- Years active: 2013–present
- Website: satomi-ito.com

Satomi Ito (伊藤 聡美, Itō Satomi; born May 31, 1988) is a Japanese fashion and costume designer known for her works in the sports of figure skating as well as artistic and rhythmic gymnastics, equestrian vaulting, ballet, and ballroom dance. Inspired by the dresses and skating performances of three-time World champion Mao Asada, Ito has designed costumes for multiple renowned figure skaters from Japan and overseas, including a series of more than 30 costumes for two-time Olympic champion Yuzuru Hanyu, which has been featured in multiple exhibitions and publications in Japan. Two of her works for Hanyu were nominated at the 2020 and 2023 ISU Skating Awards in the category Best Costume, respectively.

== Early life and education ==
Satomi Ito was born on May 31, 1988, in Chiba City east of Tokyo to a Japanese father and a Thai mother. In her childhood, she aimed to become a comic artist, author or screenwriter. Influenced by her mother who was working as a tailor, Ito found a new interest in fashion design and attended a high school with a clothing department. In 2007, she entered the Faculty for Fashion and Creativity at Esmod Japon in Tokyo. At that time, she was following figure skating events as a hobby, but her focus was on fashion design; she named Alexander McQueen and John Galliano as her role models. In 2008, Ito won her first major prize at the Kobe Fashion Contest. After graduating from Esmod, she moved to England to study at Nottingham Trent University School of Art and Design. While in Japan the focus was more on the technical aspects of design, in England she learned the "importance of concept-making and presentation skills", with more emphasis on the creation process. These experiences have shaped Ito's approach towards fashion and costume design.

== Designer career ==
=== Beginnings and success at the 2018 Winter Olympics ===
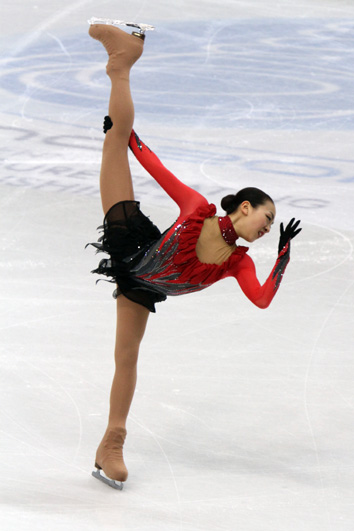
Mao Asada in her free skate program The Bell at the 2010 World Championships

After her graduation from Nottingham Trent University, Ito aimed for an internship in England or Paris. However, due to visa issues, she was forced to return to Japan. It was then that a figure skating video of three-time World champion Mao Asada encouraged Ito to pursue a career in costume design. It was Asada's red dress for her free skate program The Bell at the 2010 Winter Olympics in Vancouver that impressed and inspired Ito as a designer. However, skating costumes were a very specific sector with few experienced designers and rather little revenue, which made it difficult for Ito to focus solely on figure skating. She joined the Japanese manufacturer company Chacott in Tokyo with a specialization in costume design for ballet and other performing arts. In 2013, Ito got her first request in figure skating from Japanese single skater Haruka Imai. The costumes were well received by the skating community and led to more collaborations, including her first client from overseas, Russian single skater Elena Radionova.

In 2015, Ito became independent and has since designed a variety of costumes for figure skating, artistic and rhythmic gymnastics, equestrian vaulting, ballet, and ballroom dance. The same year, she received her first request from Japanese skater and two-time Olympic champion Yuzuru Hanyu. It was the longest collaboration of Ito's career in the following decade, and she had created more than 30 different costumes for him by August 2023. In an interview with figure skating journalist Jack Gallagher in 2022, she explained how her skills have notably "improved through the experience of working with Hanyu." The culmination of her career followed at the 2018 Winter Olympics in Pyeongchang, with Hanyu winning the gold and fellow Japanese skater Shoma Uno the silver medal in the men's singles discipline. Both skaters performed in costumes created by Ito, which proved very gratifying to her: "When I was watching the live performance, I wasn’t able to stay calm and relaxed because I was worried about the costumes. The only thing running through my head was, 'Congratulations and thank you for wearing my costumes.' "

=== Exhibitions and award nominations after 2018 ===
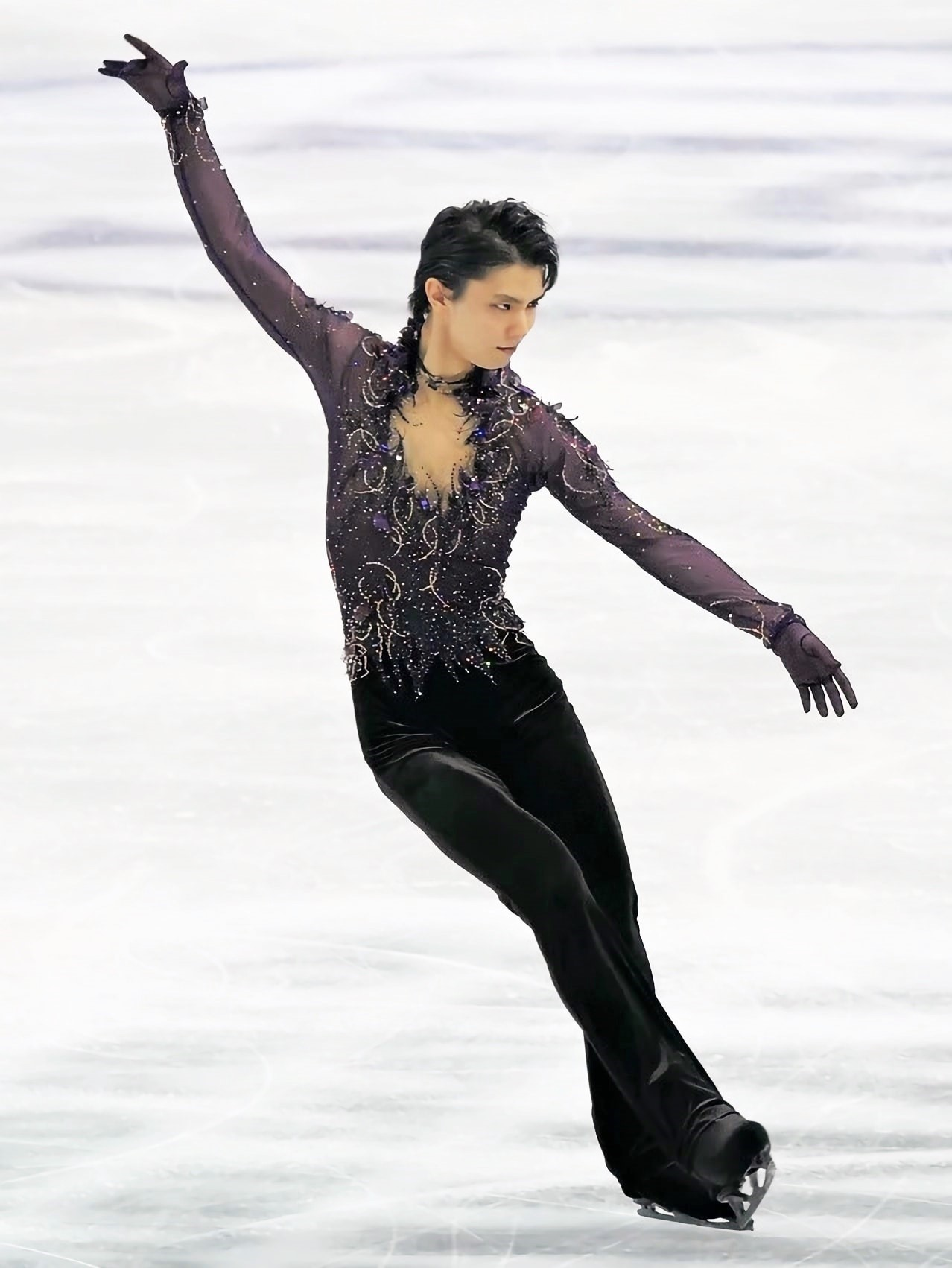
Yuzuru Hanyu in his free skate program Origin at the 2019–20 Grand Prix Final

Over the following years, the number of requests she received steadily increased to 40–50 orders per season, making Ito one of the most sought-after costume designers in figure skating. Among her clients were two-time world champion Evgenia Medvedeva, Four Continents champions Jin Boyang, Satoko Miyahara, Mai Mihara, and Rika Kihira as well as World Junior champions Marin Honda, Vincent Zhou, and Tomoki Hiwatashi. However, the COVID-19 pandemic negatively impacted Ito's career in 2020, as she did not receive any requests from March to May as usual. In March 2020, the first compilation book of Ito's works, titled Figure Skating Art Costumes, was published by the Japanese company Kadokawa. At the 2020 ISU Skating Awards, her costume for Hanyu's free skate program Origin from the 2019–20 season was nominated in the category Best Costume. It was the second version of the costume, with a change in design and color scheme of the top from black to purple. The same year, Ito created multiple costumes for athletes who participated in the 2020 Summer Olympics in Tokyo, including artistic gymnast Aiko Sugihara and rhythmic gymnast Sumire Kita from Japan.

For the 2021–22 season, the number of costume requests reached a new peak with 60–70 orders from Japan and overseas, including the Olympic costumes for Yuma Kagiyama, Wakaba Higuchi, and ice dance team Kana Muramoto and Daisuke Takahashi. Ito's costume for Hanyu's Olympic short program Introduction and Rondo Capriccioso was nominated for Best Costume at the 2023 ISU Skating Awards. On July 15, 2022, as the result of a fan vote, a replica of Hanyu's purple Origin costume was put on display on his wax figure at the Madame Tussauds museum in Tokyo. The same year, Ito eventually got the opportunity for a collaboration with Mao Asada and created four costumes for her touring ice show Beyond. For Hanyu, who turned professional in July 2022, Ito contributed five new costumes to his solo shows Prologue and Gift, with the latter featuring 11 of Ito's works in total, presented in front of a record audience of 35,000 spectators at Tokyo Dome. On the 10th anniversary of Ito's designer career in 2023, a figure skating costume exhibition was held in Tokyo from July 24 to August 6 and in Kyoto from August 11 to 27, with a special postcard book of Hanyu's costumes being sold in advance at the Tokyo venue.

== List of collaborations ==
=== Figure skating ===
Selection of figure skating costumes designed by Ito
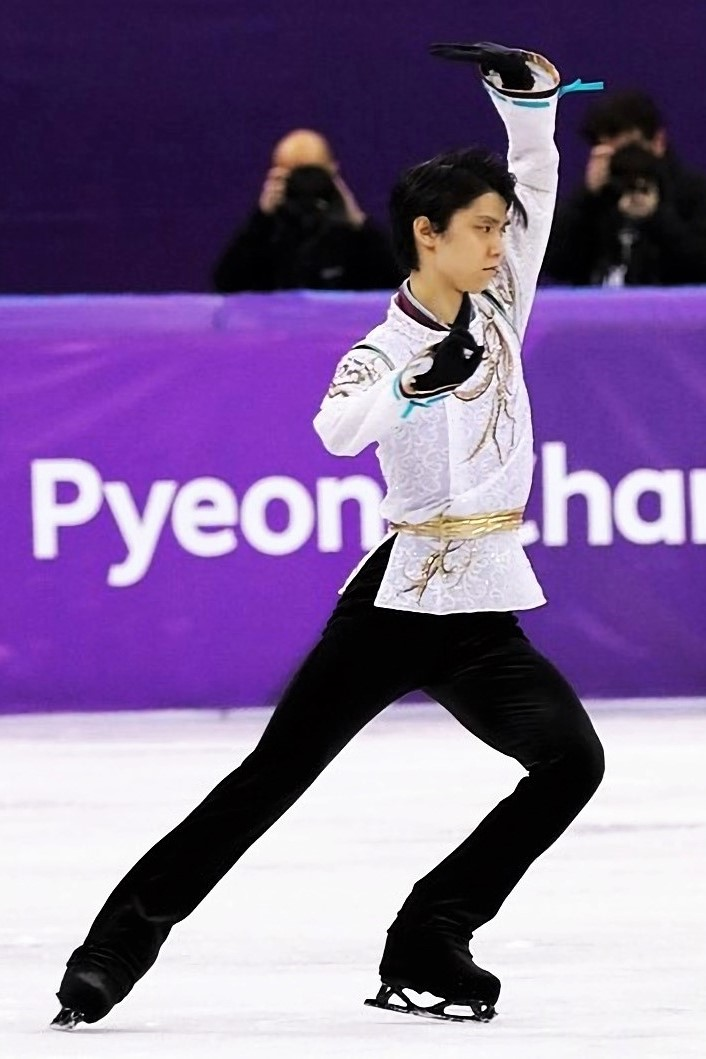
Yuzuru Hanyu
(2017–18 free skate program)

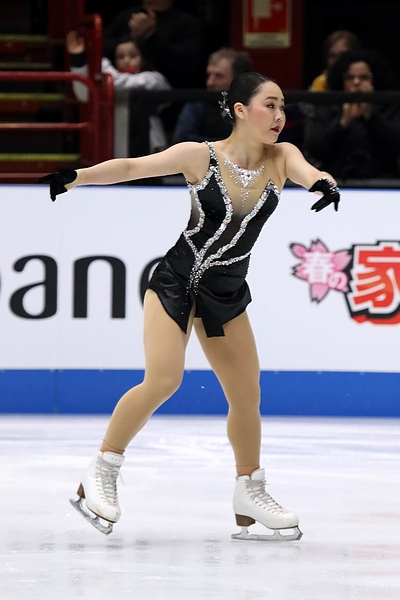
Wakaba Higuchi
(2017–18 free skate program)

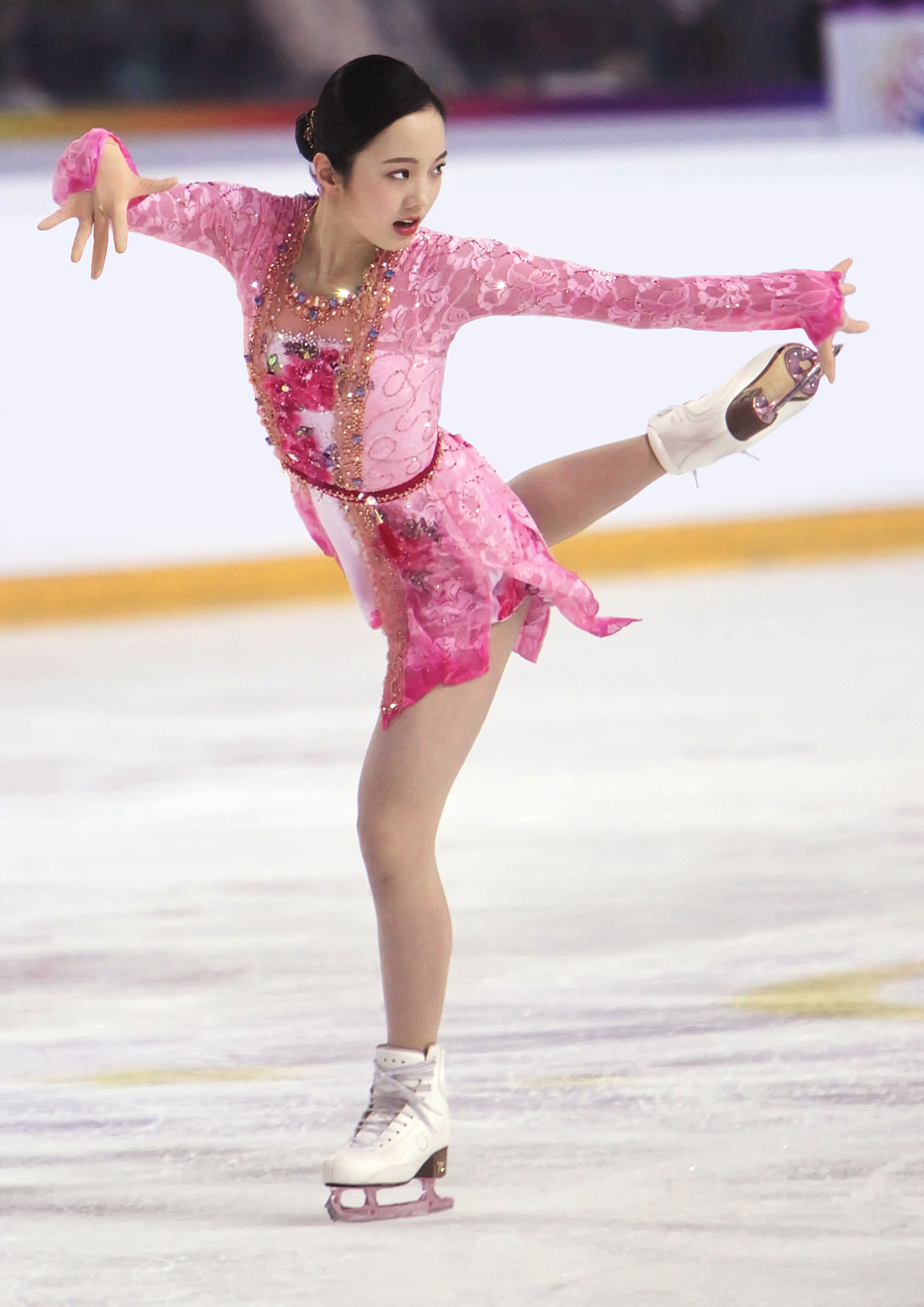
Marin Honda
(2018–19 free skate program)

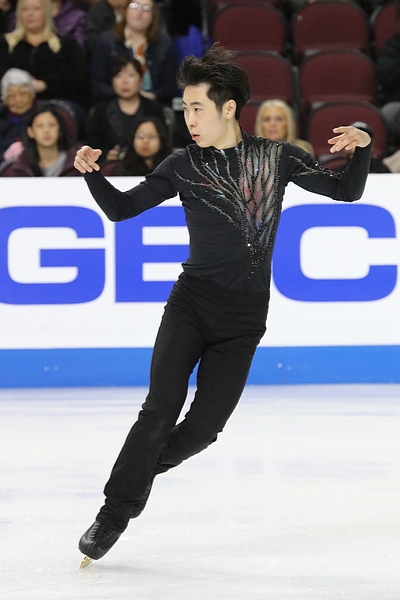
Jin Boyang
(2019–20 free skate program)

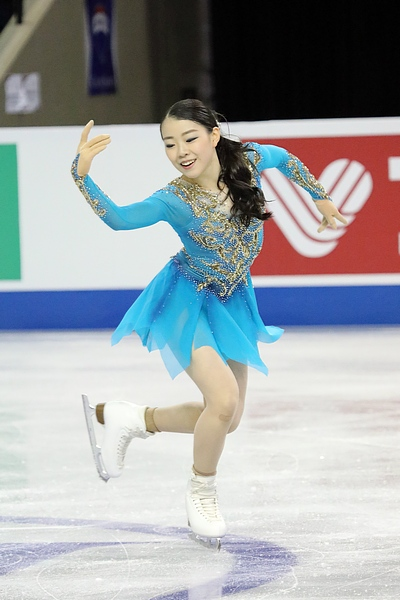
Rika Kihira
(2019–20 free skate program)

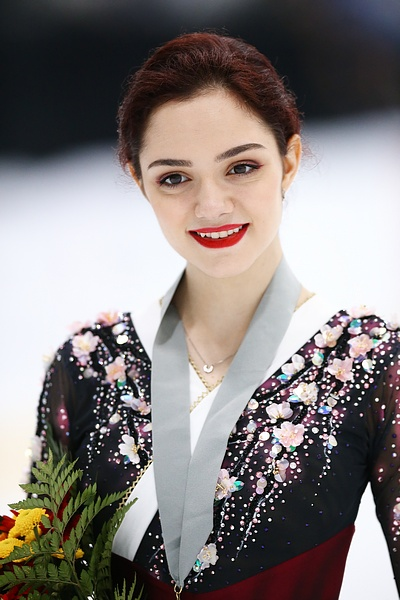
Evgenia Medvedeva
(2019–20 free skate program)

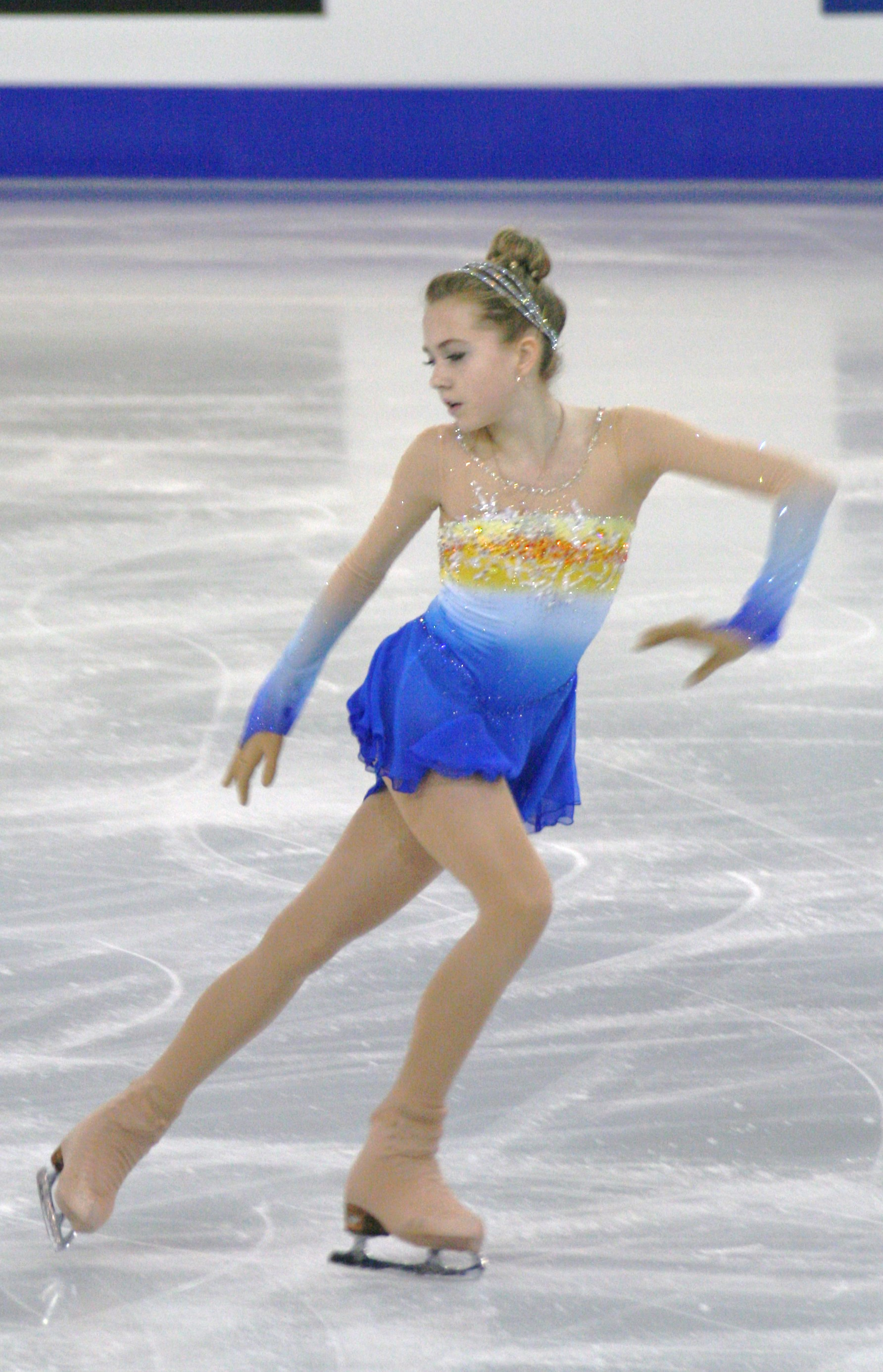
Elena Radionova
(2014–15 free skate program)

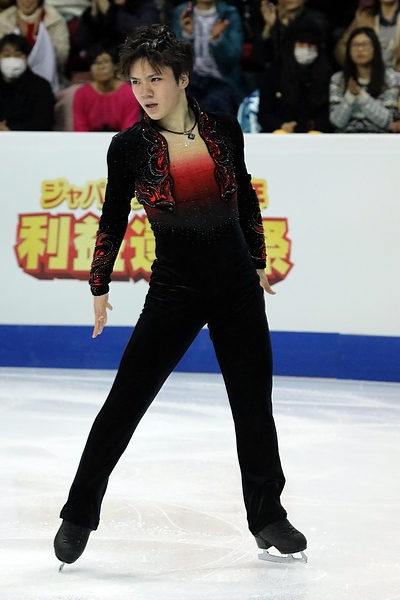
Shoma Uno
(2016–17 free skate program)

Male skaters

- Yuzuru Hanyu
- Tomoki Hiwatashi
- Jin Boyang
- Yuma Kagiyama
- Tim Koleto
- Ilia Malinin
- Daichi Miyata
- Shun Sato
- Daisuke Takahashi
- Shoma Uno
- Ean Weiler
- Vincent Zhou

Female skaters

- Mao Asada
- Shae-Lynn Bourne
- Chen Hongyi
- Mone Chiba
- Wakaba Higuchi
- Marin Honda
- Miyu Honda
- Sara Honda
- Jocelyn Hong
- Haruka Imai
- Mariko Kihara
- Rika Kihira
- Misato Komatsubara
- Yura Matsuda
- Evgenia Medvedeva
- Mai Mihara
- Satoko Miyahara
- Kana Muramoto
- Yuka Nagai
- Elena Radionova
- Ryo Shibata
- Mao Shimada
- Yuna Shiraiwa
- Rion Sumiyoshi
- Hina Takeno
- Yuhana Yokoi
- Hana Yoshida
- Zhu Yi

=== Other collaborations ===
- Sumire Kita (rhythmic gymnastics)
- Mona Pavetic (equestrian vaulting)
- Aiko Sugihara (artistic gymnastics)

== Publications ==
- Ito, Satomi (March 31, 2020). Figure Skating Art Costumes (in Japanese). Chiyoda, Tokyo: Kadokawa Future Publishing. ISBN 978-4046044631.
- — (April 18, 2022). Muse on Ice (in Japanese). Chiyoda, Tokyo: G.B. Corporation. ISBN 978-4910428154.
- — (August 2, 2023a). Yuzuru Hanyu's Costumes made by Satomi Ito (in Japanese). Chiyoda, Tokyo: Two Virgins Publishing. ISBN 978-4910352831.
