= Yuzuru Hanyu Olympic seasons =

Olympic champion in men's figure skating 2014 and 2018

Yuzuru Hanyu
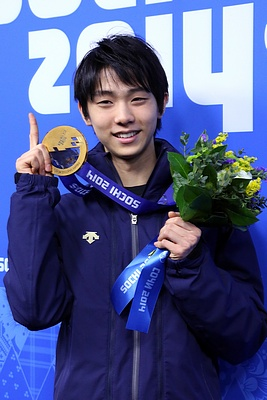
- Hanyu at the 2014 Winter Olympics in Sochi, after winning his first Olympic gold medal

Yuzuru Hanyu article series
- Skating career: Olympic seasons; Career achievements; Figure skating programs
- Other works: Bibliography
- Solo ice shows: Prologue; Gift; Repray Tour; Echoes of Life Tour; Realive; White Box Tour
- Ensemble ice shows: Fantasy on Ice; Continues with Wings; Yuzuru Hanyu Notte Stellata

Yuzuru Hanyu, a former competitive figure skater from Japan, participated in the Winter Olympic Games three times, winning two gold medals (in 2014 and 2018) and placing fourth in 2022. In 2014, he became the first Asian men's singles skater to win at the Olympics. At 19 years old, he was also the youngest male skater to win the Olympic title since American Dick Button in 1948. In 2018, Hanyu became the first male single skater in 66 years to win two consecutive Olympic gold medals since Button in 1952.

In his three Olympic seasons, Hanyu skated to three different short and free skate programs each, with their background and making being broadly covered by the media. In the first season, 2013–14, he became the first Asian and second skater across all disciplines to win the Olympics, Worlds, and the Grand Prix Final in the same season, after Russian Alexei Yagudin in 2001–02. Hanyu also set two world records in the short program, becoming the first skater to score above 100 points in that competition segment, at the 2014 Winter Olympics. In 2017–18, he set another short program record of 112.72 points, which remained the standing record in the old +3/-3 GOE judging system. (Note: With the change of the judging system, the ISU decided to start the recording of highest score statistics from zero and declared all records historical that were achieved before the 2018–19 season.) At the 2017 Rostelecom Cup, he also landed his first quadruple Lutz jump in competition. In his third and last Olympic season, 2021–22, Hanyu won his sixth national title and went for the quadruple Axel jump for the first time, with his attempt at the Beijing Olympics being the closest in competition up to then. On July 19, 2022, he announced his decision to conclude his competitive figure skating career and turn professional.

For his achievements at the Winter Olympics, Hanyu was bestowed with the People's Honor Award by the prime minister of Japan (2018) as well as two Medals of Honor with Purple Ribbon (2014, 2018). He also received the Kikuchi Kan Prize for his accomplishments in figure skating (2022), including his back-to-back titles at the Winter Games. Two monuments honoring his Olympic wins were installed at the International Center Station in his hometown of Sendai. Hanyu was featured in various prestigious lists, such as Forbes' 30 Under 30 Asia (2018), and made it to ESPN's top 10 of the greatest Olympians of the 21st century. In 2022, he was ranked sixth in the list of most-searched athletes on Google Search worldwide.

== 2013–14 season ==
=== Key events before the 2013–14 season ===
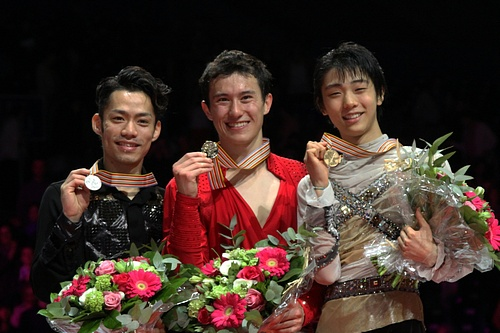
Hanyu with Patrick Chan (center) and Daisuke Takahashi (left) at the 2012 World Championships podium, having won his first world medal

In the 2010–11 season, Hanyu moved up to senior level as the reigning World and National Junior champion as well as the Junior Grand Prix Final winner. He faced significant competition in the Japanese senior field, including Daisuke Takahashi, Nobunari Oda, Takahiko Kozuka, and Tatsuki Machida, who all had finished ahead of him at the previous Japan Figure Skating Championships. In that season, Hanyu landed his first successful quadruple jump, a quad toe loop, and won his first medal at a main international senior competition at the 2011 Four Continents Championships, where he placed second behind Takahashi.

After the 2011 Tōhoku earthquake and tsunami, which had caused severe damage to his home rink in Sendai, Hanyu was forced to move his training base for the rest of the season. He participated in 60 ice shows to get additional practice time and raise money for the areas affected by the disaster. He launched the following season at the 2011 Nebelhorn Trophy, where he won his first gold medal at an international senior competition. During the event, he shared his career goals with the media:

My goals for the future are to land all quad jumps in competition. I would also like to learn the quad Axel. Another goal is to win the next two Olympics, or at least win medals.

At the 2012 World Championships, Hanyu became the youngest Japanese World medalist, finishing third behind then two-time world champion Patrick Chan and Daisuke Takahashi, who both acknowledged Hanyu as a potential strong rival in the future. Upon the conclusion of the 2011–12 season, Hanyu changed coaches from Nanami Abe, with whom he had trained since 2004, and moved to Canada to train with Brian Orser at the Toronto Cricket Club. His main motivation for the change were the consistent quadruple jumps by Orser's student Javier Fernández. The move resulted in immediate success; in the following season, Hanyu landed his first quad Salchow in international competition and set his first two world records in the short program segment. He also beat Chan for the first time in competition at the Grand Prix Final in Sochi, which served as a test event for the 2014 Winter Olympics, and won his first national senior title at the 2012–13 Japan Championships, defeating the reigning and five-time national champion, Daisuke Takahashi. Despite a knee injury and ankle sprain, he managed to finish fourth at the subsequent World Championships behind Patrick Chan (gold), Denis Ten (silver), and Javier Fernández (bronze), helping to secure three berths for the Japanese national team at the 2014 Winter Olympics.

=== Programs of the 2013–14 season ===
==== Short program: "Parisienne Walkways" ====
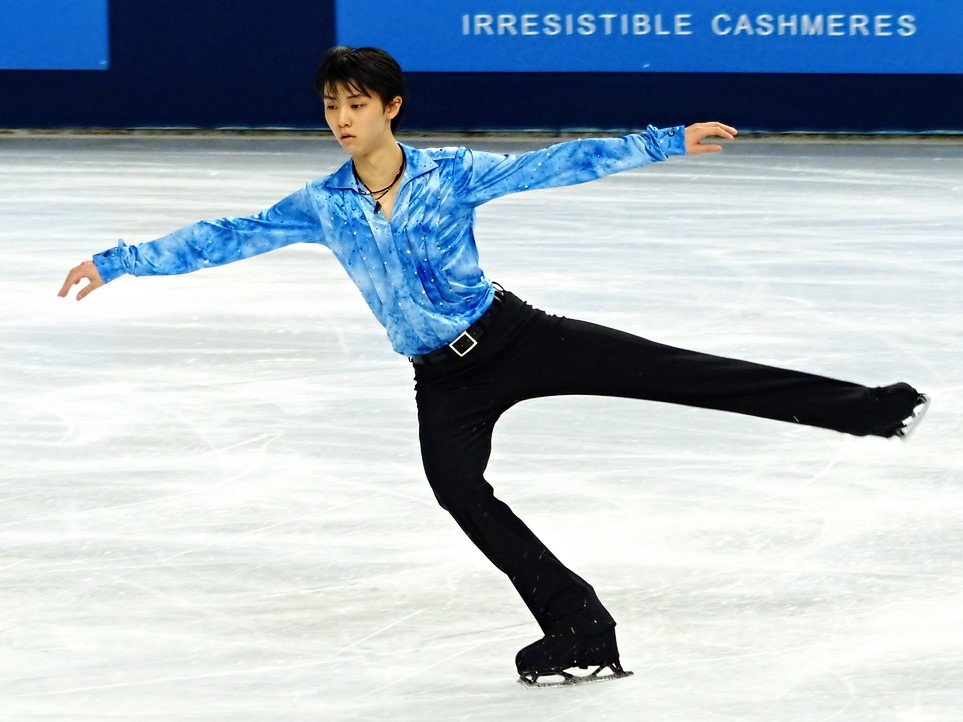
Hanyu performing his short program to "Parisienne Walkways" at the 2013 Trophée Éric Bompard

For his first Olympic season, Hanyu returned to his short program "Parisienne Walkways" from the 2012–13 season. The music piece is a medley of the songs "Parisienne Walkways" by Gary Moore and "Hoochie Coochie Man" by the Jeff Healey Band from their album Live at Montreux 1999. Hanyu scored two world records with the program in his two Grand Prix events in the previous season.

"Parisienne Walkways" was the first of Hanyu's multiple collaborations with Canadian choreographer Jeffrey Buttle. For Buttle, who was also choreographing a short program for the defending three-time world champion Patrick Chan in the same season, it was important to highlight the different strengths of the two skaters. In Hanyu's case, Buttle wanted not only to create a program that fit the wild abandon in his skating but also to help him to overcome his shyness and have some fun. He pointed out Hanyu's engagement and active role in the creation of the choreography: "It's always nice to have someone who will sort of play along with the choreography instead of just standing and waiting for me to say something". Later, in 2018, Buttle named "Parisienne Walkways" as the most memorable of the three programs he had choreographed for Hanyu up to then. He praised Hanyu's ability to pull in the audience and his maturity as a performer at such young age.

The costume for the program was created by Japanese costume designer Tadashi Nagashima. For the 2013–14 season, the color of the shirt was changed from grey to blue.

==== Free skate program: Romeo and Juliet ====
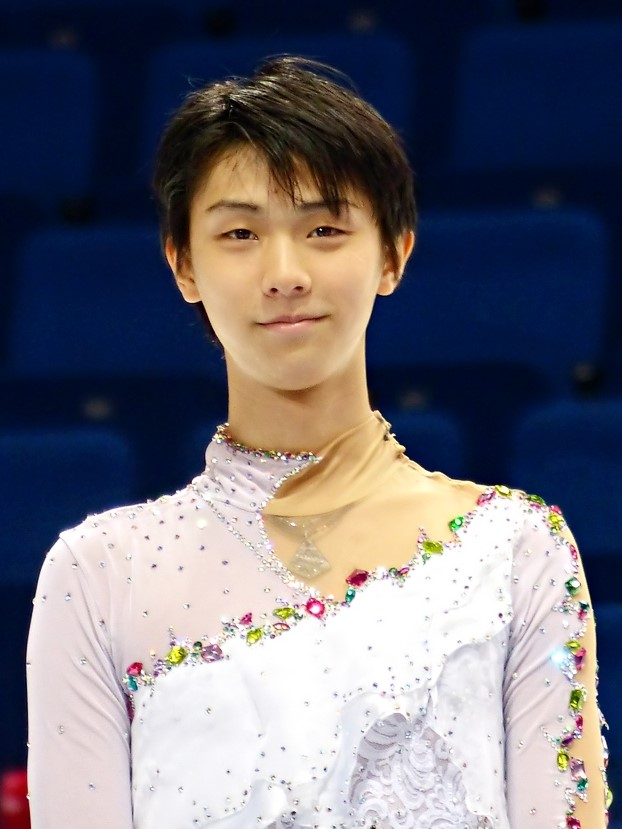
Hanyu in his free skate costume of Romeo and Juliet at the 2013 Finlandia Trophy

For the free skate, Hanyu selected the music from Franco Zeffirelli's film Romeo and Juliet (1968) composed by Nino Rota. In the 2011–12 season, he had already performed to Craig Armstrong's soundtrack of Baz Luhrmann's film Romeo + Juliet (1996), earning him his first world championship medal.

The music piece was Hanyu's personal choice; the program was meant to mark the culmination of his first four senior seasons. The 2011 Tōhoku earthquake and tsunami, his success at the 2012 World Championships, and the subsequent coaching change were three key events of that period that influenced his decision, as he stated: "I spent two years with Nanami Abe in Sendai and another two years with Brian and his team in Toronto. I wanted to create a program that expresses my gratitude for these four years." Romeo + Juliet was the first free skate program he had skated after the earthquake, having performed it at multiple ice shows across Japan. The support he had received from his fans, coaches, and family at that time made the music piece meaningful and precious to him. However, he switched from Armstrong's to Rota's soundtrack for the Olympic season as he thought it stood out the most among the different versions of Romeo and Juliet, and he had long wished to skate to that specific music piece.

Hanyu asked Canadian choreographer David Wilson to create the program for him, but Wilson felt "conflicted" because he had previously created choreography to the piece for many skaters, including Sasha Cohen's free skate program for the 2006 Winter Olympics. In his letter to Wilson, Hanyu stressed his desire to skate to Rota's soundtrack and win the Olympics with it: "I don't want to wait until the next Olympics to be the Olympic champion, I want to be the Olympic champion now. And I'm willing to do anything to make that happen, so please, please help me." Wilson, who had already rejected Hanyu's request to skate to The Phantom of the Opera in the previous season, eventually agreed after realizing that Hanyu would use the music piece either way.

The costume of the program was designed by American figure skater Johnny Weir, whom Hanyu named as one of his skating idols, and made by Stephanie Handler. The color and shape of the top were influenced by Weir's personal preference for "white and sparkly" costumes.

=== 2013 pre-Olympic events ===
Statistics before the 2014 Olympics
Personal bests
- Short program: 99.84 (WR)
- Free skate: 193.14
- Combined total: 293.25

Technical content
- Types of quad jumps: 4T, 4S
- Quad jumps in SP: 1
- Quad jumps in FS: 2
- Only successfully executed jumps and layouts listed (not planned content)

Hanyu's first competition of the Olympic season was the 2013 Finlandia Trophy, where he won the gold medal after placing first in both competition segments, setting unofficial personal best scores with 180.93 points in the free skate and 265.59 in the combined total. (Note: Results achieved at the 2013 Finlandia Trophy, which had not been part of the ISU Challenger Series at that time, were not recognized by the International Skating Union (ISU) for new highest scores, including personal bests.)

His assignments in the 2013–14 Grand Prix series were the Skate Canada International and Trophée Éric Bompard. At Skate Canada, he moved up from third place in the short program to second overall and won silver behind Patrick Chan. Hanyu expressed his disappointment with both performances, having received negative grades of execution (GOE) for all three attempted quadruple jumps and another three jumping passes. At the Trophée Éric Bompard, he skated a clean short program and improved his world record score from the 2012 NHK Trophy by 0.05 points. However, he finished second behind Chan, who had scored world records in all three competition segments with 98.52 points in the short program, 196.75 in the free skate, and 295.27 in the combined total. The two second-place finishes qualified Hanyu for the 2013–14 Grand Prix Final in Fukuoka, where he placed first in the short program and set a new world record with 99.84 points. He also won the free skate despite a fall on the quadruple Salchow, scoring new personal bests of 193.41 in the free skate and 293.25 in the combined total, and claiming his first Grand Prix Final title.

In December 2013, Hanyu competed at the Japan Championships, where he went on to win his second national title after placing first in both competition segments. His scores of 103.10 in the short program and 297.80 in the combined total both exceeded the incumbent world records. However, they were not officially recognized as new highest scores because the International Skating Union (ISU) only recorded results that were achieved at international competitions, not national championships. Hanyu was subsequently appointed as part of the Japanese team for the 2014 Winter Olympics and World Championships.

=== 2014 Winter Olympics ===
Hanyu's performances at the 2014 Winter Olympics

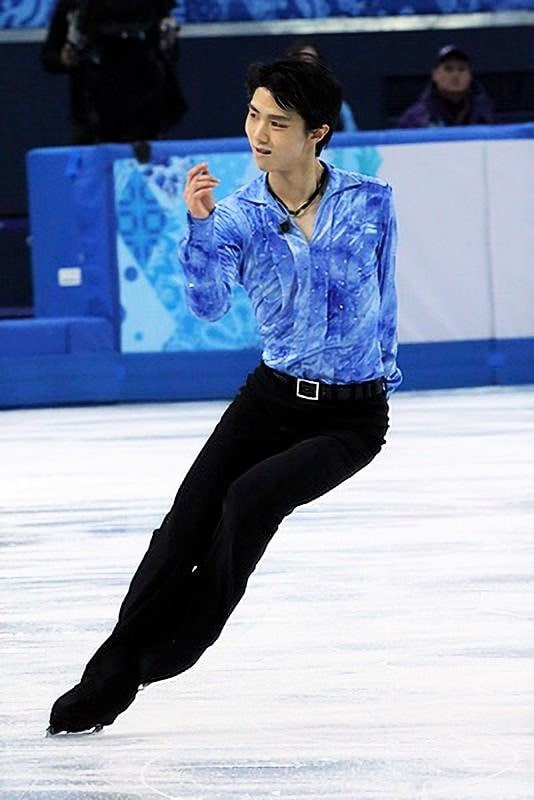
"Parisienne Walkways"
Short program (team) on YouTube
Short program (individual) on YouTube
(Olympic Channel)

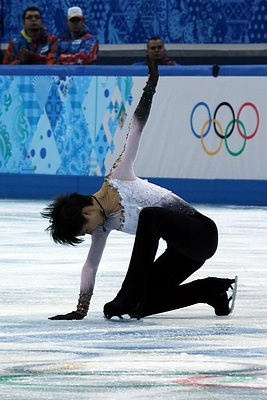
Romeo and Juliet
Free skating on YouTube
(Olympic Channel)

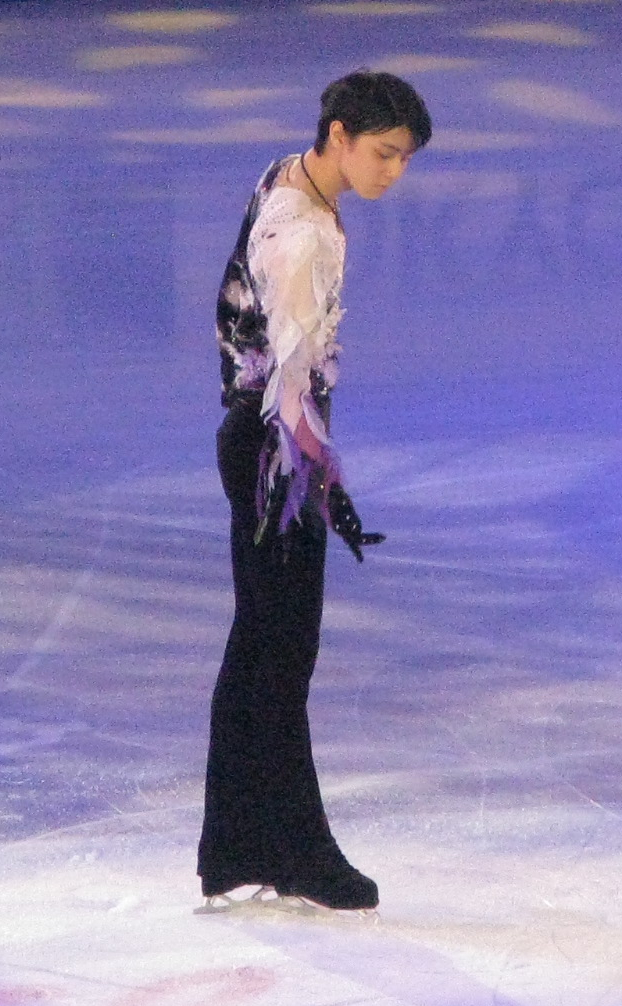
"White Legend"
Exhibition gala on YouTube
(Olympic Channel)

Hanyu went into his first Olympics as one of the gold medal favorites besides Patrick Chan, Daisuke Takahashi, and Russian Evgeni Plushenko, the 2006 Olympic champion as well as the 2002 and 2010 Olympic silver medalist. Hanyu participated in the men's short program of the inaugural figure skating team event, where he competed for the first time against Plushenko whom he had admired growing up. Hanyu performed a clean program and scored an Olympic event record of 97.98, winning that segment and earning 10 points for the Japanese team, which had finished fifth at the end of the event.

In the short program of the men's individual event, Hanyu broke his world record with a score of 101.45, becoming the first skater in history to surpass 100 points in the short program. He went into the free skate with a near four-point lead ahead of Patrick Chan, but fell on the opening quad Salchow and put both hands down on a triple flip. Despite the mistakes, Hanyu managed to place first in the segment and score new Olympic records of 178.64 in the free skate and 280.09 overall, surpassing Plushenko's and Evan Lysacek's winning scores from the two previous Winter Games by more than 20 points. In the final standings, Hanyu finished first ahead of Patrick Chan (silver) and Denis Ten (bronze), capturing the first Olympic gold medal for Japan in the men's singles event. It was the second Olympic title in figure skating for the nation, following Shizuka Arakawa's win in the women's event at the 2006 Winter Olympics. Hanyu's victory also marked the first time an Asian country won gold in the men's event, and he became the youngest Olympic men's champion since American Dick Button in 1948. In addition, he was the only Japanese athlete across all sports to win gold at the 2014 Winter Olympics in Sochi. After the competition, Hanyu expressed his dissatisfaction with the free skate, but also his determination as the reigning Olympic champion to become stronger and work hard to create a new era, pledging to compete again at the next Winter Olympics in 2018.

=== 2014 post-Olympic events and after season honors ===
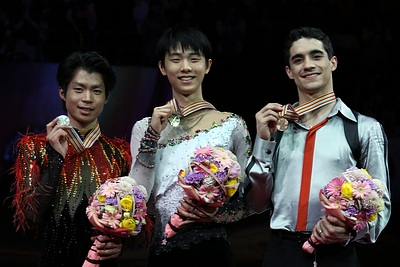
Hanyu with Tatsuki Machida (left) and Javier Fernández (right) at the 2014 World Championships podium, after winning his first world title

Hanyu concluded the season with a victory at the 2014 World Championships in Saitama. He sat in third place after a fall on a quad toe loop in the short program, trailing fellow Japanese skater Tatsuki Machida by about seven points. Hanyu came back with a strong free skate, landing both planned quadruple jumps successfully, and claimed his first world title with a total score of 282.59, winning by one of the smallest margins of 0.33 points ahead of silver medalist Machida. Hanyu became the first Asian and second skater across all disciplines to win the Olympics, Worlds, and the Grand Prix Final in the same season, after Alexei Yagudin in 2001–02. He finished the season being ranked first in the world standings and the season's world rankings.

On April 26, 2014, after returning to his hometown of Sendai, a parade was organized by Miyagi Prefecture, Sendai City, and Miyagi Prefecture Skating Federation to celebrate Hanyu's Olympic gold medal. It was held along the Higashi Nibancho Street in the city center and attended by about 92,000 people. Two days later, Hanyu was bestowed with the Medal of Honor with Purple Ribbon by the Government of Japan for his contributions in sports. In June, a special ice show titled Together on Ice was held at Xebio Arena Sendai in Hanyu's hometown of Sendai to celebrate his success of winning the Olympics, Worlds, and Grand Prix Final in one season. The show featured skaters and artists with connections to the region like the band Monkey Majik as well as overseas skaters related to Hanyu, including Evgeni Plushenko, Johnny Weir, and Javier Fernández.

In May 2015, the Madame Tussauds museum in Tokyo unveiled a life-size wax figure of Hanyu in the costume and ending pose of his Olympic short program "Parisienne Walkways". On July 15, 2022, the costume on the wax figure was changed to the one, which he had used for his free skate program Origin in the 2019–20 season. In memory of Hanyu's and Shizuka Arakawa's victories at the Winter Olympics, two monuments were installed in April 2017 in their hometown near the south exit of the International Center Station on the Sendai Subway Tozai Line. Like his wax figure, Hanyu's monument also depicts the ending pose of the "Parisienne Walkways" program.

== 2017–18 season ==
=== Key events before the 2017–18 season ===
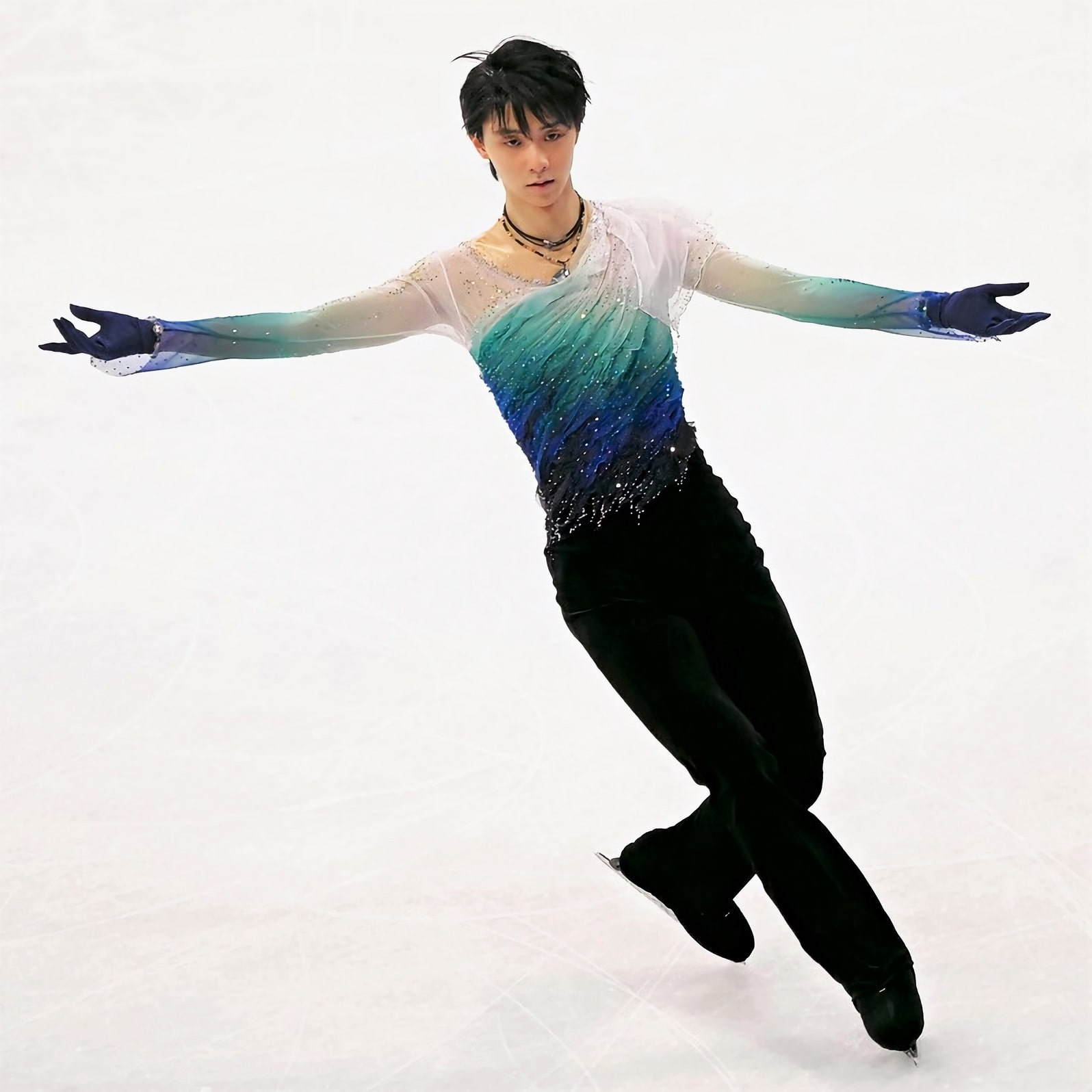
Hanyu in his record-breaking free skate to Hope and Legacy at the 2017 World Championships

In his second Olympic cycle, Hanyu improved his short program results, having scored above 100 points five times in 17 international competitions before the 2017–18 season. However, in 2014–15, he was struggling with his technical layout, which featured a quadruple toe loop and a triple-triple combination placed in the second half. The issue continued at the 2015 Skate Canada, where he placed sixth in the segment with two invalid jumping passes. While his coach Brian Orser suggested a more "conservative" change, Hanyu decided to add another quad, stating: "I thought by the time of the Pyeongchang Olympics, you cannot win without a short program that includes two quads with difficult entries and exits—plus excellent footwork, spins, and presentation. As the reigning Olympic champion, I want to be absolutely dominant." The offensive strategy earned him back-to-back world records at the 2015 NHK Trophy and the Grand Prix Final, the latter remaining the highest score with 110.95 points until the Olympic season. In his short program at the 2016 Autumn Classic, he also became the first skater to land a quadruple loop jump in international competition.

In the free skate segment, Hanyu was the dominant skater of the Olympic cycle, having set three world records as well as the highest score in all three seasons before 2017–18. At the 2015 NHK Trophy, he became the first skater to score above 200 points, improving Patrick Chan’s previous record by almost 20 points. Hanyu cleared the 200 mark five times before the Olympic season, including his performance at the 2015–16 Grand Prix Final, which earned him maximum scores for four technical elements as well as 24 perfect marks of 10.00 in the program components. In 2016–17, he increased the technical difficulty of his free skate, which featured four quadruple jumps, including a quad loop. At the 2017 World Championships, he became the first skater to surpass 220 points with a score of 223.20, which remained the standing record until the Olympic season. In July 2022, Hanyu named this free skate performance of his program Hope and Legacy as the one that he thought would represent him best and was the most perfectly executed of his competitive career.

Despite a series of injuries, including a heavy crash with Chinese skater Yan Han in the warm-up at the 2014 Cup of China, Hanyu managed to become the first skater to win four consecutive Grand Prix Finals. He also added a second world title and two more national titles to his medal record and became the first skater to score above 300 points in the combined total. However, he also suffered defeats by Javier Fernández at two World Championships as well as American Nathan Chen at the 2017 Four Continents Championships in Pyeongchang, which served as a test event for the 2018 Winter Olympics. By the end of the 2016–17 season, four other skaters had also passed 300 points in the combined total score: Fernández, Chen, Jin Boyang, and Hanyu's compatriot Shoma Uno.

=== Programs of the 2017–18 season ===
==== Short program: Ballade No. 1 ====
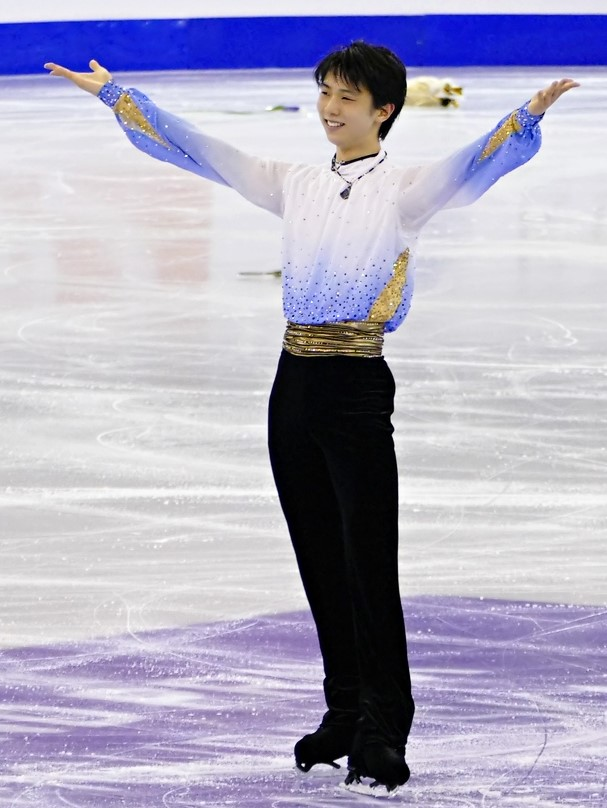
Hanyu after his short program to Ballade No. 1 at the 2015–16 Grand Prix Final

For the short program, Hanyu decided to use Ballade No. 1 in G minor, Op. 23, composed by Frédéric Chopin and performed by Krystian Zimerman, for a third time after the 2014–15 and 2015–16 season. With the program, he set back-to-back world records at the 2015 NHK Trophy and the Grand Prix Final. The latter remained the incumbent record until the Olympic season. Ballade No. 1 was also the first and only short program to score above 110 points at that time.

The program was choreographed by Jeffrey Buttle, who supported Hanyu's decision to reuse Ballade No. 1 for the Olympic season. In his opinion, it was important to choose a piece that the skater was familiar and comfortable with when facing the additional pressure at the Olympics. In May 2017, Hanyu debuted the Olympic version of Ballade No. 1 at the Japanese touring ice show Fantasy on Ice in Makuhari with a new distribution of the elements, various choreographic changes, and increased technical difficulty, including a quadruple loop jump as well as a quad toe loop-triple toe loop combination in the second half of the program. On the third day of the show, for the first time, he skated a televised clean short program that featured a quad loop. After the show, Hanyu stated in an interview that he preferred the placement of the steps and spins in the layout he had used at the 2015 NHK Trophy, while in the new version the jumps matched the musical structure of the program better. He also noted that the new layout resembled the original choreography of the program, with the opening jump entered and exited by a spread eagle, and a quadruple toe loop placed in the second half. However, compared to his performances from the 2014–15 season, Hanyu now had the required technical skills to realize his and Buttle's initial vision for the program.

The original costume of Ballade No. 1 was designed and created by Tadashi Nagashima. The design used at the 2017 Rostelecom Cup and the 2018 Winter Olympics was the fourth version of the costume. Compared to the version of the 2015–16 season, the most striking changes were the additional rhinestones at the collar and the removal of golden trim at the waist and sleeves.

==== Free skate program: Seimei ====
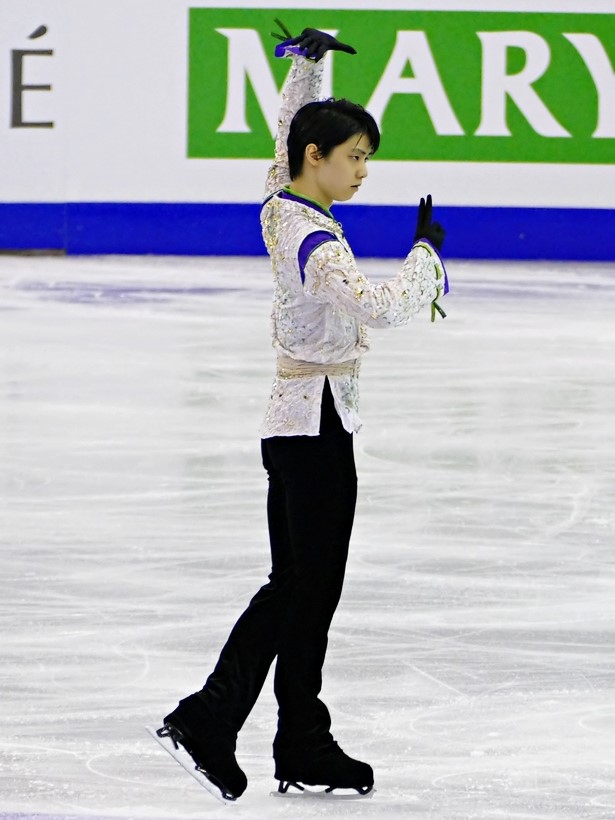
Opening pose of Hanyu's free skate program Seimei at the 2015–16 Grand Prix Final

For the free skate, Hanyu decided to repeat his program Seimei to the soundtrack of the films Onmyōji and Onmyōji II (The Yin-Yang Master) composed by Shigeru Umebayashi. In the 2015–16 season, he set back-to-back world records with the program at the NHK Trophy and the Grand Prix Final, becoming the first skater to score above 200 points in the free skate. The good results and strong performances at past events encouraged him to bring back the program for the Olympics: "I was able to perform well to that music so I knew I wanted to use it in the Olympic season. I've been saving it for this occasion". Compared to the technical layout of the 2015–16 season, Hanyu planned to increase the difficulty of the program, with a quad Lutz and quad loop as the first two elements and another three quadruple jumps in the second half. He also noted the improvements in the program's composition compared to the previous season and his aim to create "strong, attacking choreography".

In the program, Hanyu portrayed the onmyōji Abe no Seimei, a Japanese astronomer of the Heian period in the 10th century. He debuted the program at the Dreams on Ice show in June 2015 and shared his thoughts on the music choice, stating: "I want to expand my performing scale, and I want to do something Japanese. I think among all amateur male skaters, I am the one who fits traditional Japanese style the most". Alongside the movies' storyline, which contains fantastical elements as well as energetic battle scenes, Hanyu wanted to illustrate the duality of sensitivity and strength, femininity and masculinity, that he believes to exist in every human being.

The program was choreographed by Canadian ice dancer Shae-Lynn Bourne, who had created Hanyu's free skate program to The Phantom of the Opera for the 2014–15 season. Not familiar with the historical and cultural background of the music piece, Bourne conducted her own research by watching the movies as well studying the dance movements and story of the program. In an interview, she noted how fast and seamless the process had been and acknowledged Hanyu's active role in it. In August 2022, Bourne named Seimei as the program that left the deepest impression on her among the five free skates she had choreographed for Hanyu in the course of his competitive career.

Hanyu's commitment was also noted by Takuya Yamaguchi, the chief priest of the Seimei Shrine in Kyoto, who met Hanyu during his visit and was impressed by his research and knowledge about Seimei. To broaden his performance skills and better incorporate the role of the onmyōji, Bourne advised Hanyu to arrange a meeting with Mansai Nomura, who had portrayed the character in the two movies. A well-known stage actor in the traditional Japanese kyōgen theater, Nomura introduced Hanyu to the basic patterns and movements of kata and gave him advice on his posture and hand movements during the program. Feeling that a Japanese music piece might be better edited by a Japanese music editor, Hanyu personally sent a request to Keiichi Yano. Having a clear vision of the music he wanted, he exchanged over 50 emails with Yano, resulting in a total of 32 different music cuts in a span of one month. In addition, Hanyu recorded his own breath for the opening of the program, stating: "I want some trigger sound, and I want it to be something like a sound of a breath, not a sound of an instrument."

The costume was designed by Satomi Ito, who had created four different versions of the top between 2015 and 2017. The design was inspired by the clothes of the royal family in the Heian period. The biggest change to the 2015–16 season version was the removal of majority of the embroidery to reduce the weight of the costume. The version created for the 2017 Autumn Classic differed slightly in colors from the Olympic one. Hanyu requested the use of white patterned fabric with purple and green-colored parts as well as a pentagram, one of Seimei's notable symbols.

=== 2017 pre-Olympic events ===
Statistics before the 2018 Olympics
Personal bests
- Short program: 112.72 (WR)
- Free skate: 223.20 (WR)
- Combined total: 330.43 (WR)

Technical content
- Types of quad jumps: 4T, 4S, 4Lo, 4Lz
- Quad jumps in SP: 2 (1 in 2nd half)
- Quad jumps in FS: 4 (3 in 2nd half)
- Only successfully executed jumps and layouts listed (not planned content)

At the 2017 Autumn Classic, his first competition of the season, Hanyu received 112.72 points for his short program, breaking the world record he had set at the 2015–16 Grand Prix Final (110.95). He executed all of his jumping passes cleanly, with two of them receiving the then highest possible grade of execution of +3 unanimously from the judges. (Note: While the Winter Olympics, ISU Championships, and the Grand Prix series usually have nine judges on the panel, at the 2017 Autumn Classic International, which was part of the 2017–18 ISU Challenger Series, the panel consisted of seven judges with the highest and lowest mark being dropped from the final score.) Due to pain in his right knee, Hanyu chose not to attempt the quadruple loop in the competition. In the free skate, he performed an error-filled program, placing fifth in the segment and winning the silver medal behind Javier Fernández. After the competition Hanyu noted: "That seems to be the constant theme to overcome in my skating life—the big gaps between my good performances and my bad performances."

His scheduled competitions for the 2017–18 Grand Prix series were the Rostelecom Cup and NHK Trophy. At the former, Hanyu was second after the short program. He under-rotated and lost his balance on the opening quadruple loop and fell after his jump combination. (Note: According to the 2021–22 ISU Technical Panel Handbook, a figure skating jump is "considered as 'under-rotated' if it has missing rotation of more than a 1/4 but less than a 1/2 revolution." The jump receives a 20% reduction of its base value and gets marked with a "<" sign.) In the free skate, he landed his first quadruple Lutz in competition and received 1.14 GOE for the jump element. Despite making mistakes on two of his other jumping passes, his performance pulled him into first place in the segment, with a score of 195.92. He finished second overall behind Nathan Chen by about three points.

On November 9, 2017, Hanyu injured a lateral ligament in his right ankle while practicing the quad Lutz. As a result, he withdrew from the NHK Trophy, which automatically disqualified him from competing for his fifth consecutive Grand Prix Final title. With his recovery taking longer than expected, he subsequently decided to also withdraw from the Japan Championships even though the event served as an Olympic qualifier for Japanese skaters. Despite his withdrawal, Hanyu was assured of a spot on the Olympic team, given his top world standing as well as his position as the reigning world champion and defending Olympic champion. On December 24, the Japan Skating Federation (JSF) announced that he was assigned to represent Japan at the 2018 Winter Olympics and World Championships. However, he would not participate in the Olympic team event to have more time to practice and prepare at his training base in Toronto for the individual event.

=== 2018 Winter Olympics ===
Hanyu's performances at the 2018 Winter Olympics

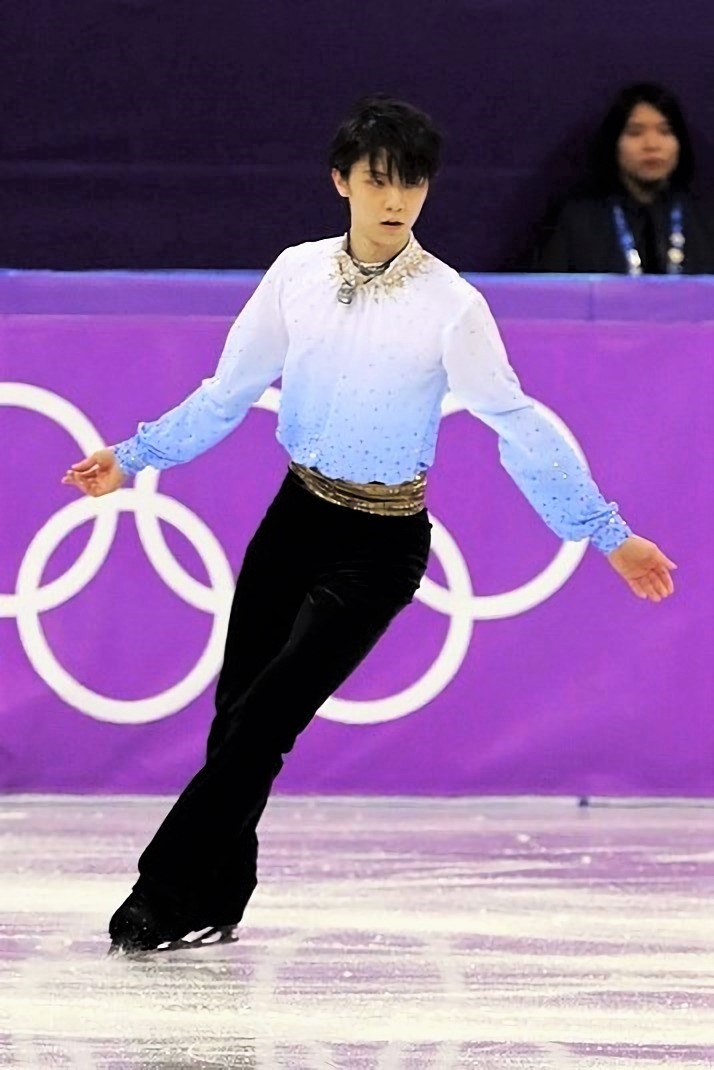
Ballade No. 1
Short program on YouTube
(Olympic Channel)

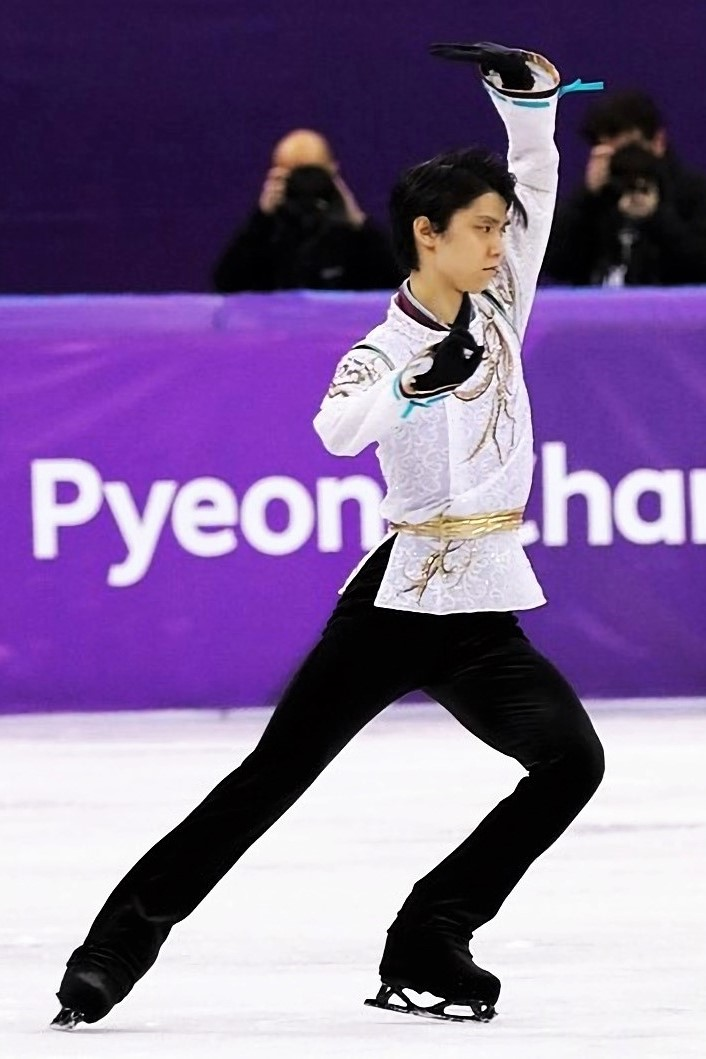
Seimei
Free skating on YouTube
(Olympic Channel)

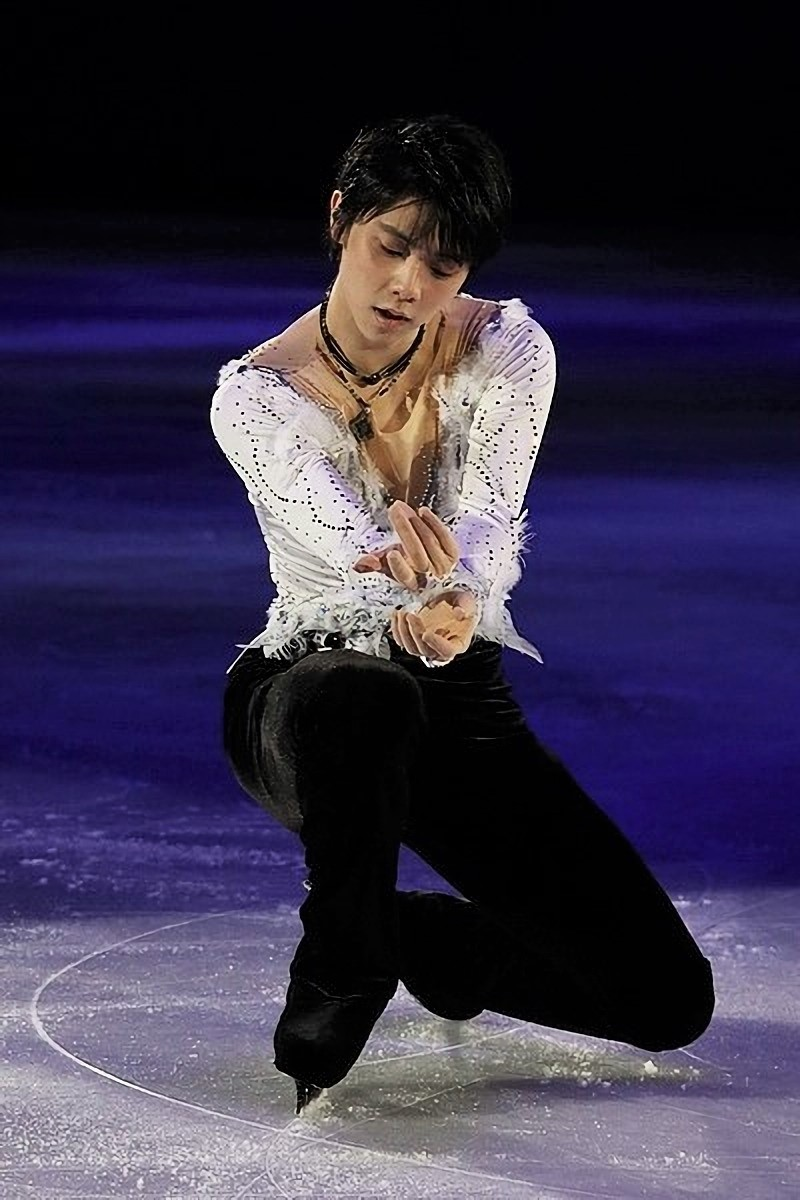
"Notte Stellata (The Swan)"
Exhibition gala on YouTube
(Olympic Channel)

Hanyu arrived in South Korea amid intense media coverage on February 11, 2018, accompanied by a heavy security detail. His practice sessions at the Olympics were a subject of media scrutiny and attended by hundreds of reporters. At a press conference on February 13, held after one of his official practices, Hanyu revealed that he had been off the ice until January and only started executing triple jumps three weeks and quadruple jumps two weeks before the competition. He stated that he still had not decided which technical elements he would use for the individual event.

On February 16, Hanyu performed a flawless short program, scoring a new Olympic event record of 111.68 points and placing first in the segment. The score was only 1.04 points shy of his personal best and the then world record of 112.72. In the free skate, he performed a solid program that included four quadruple jumps, three of them landed cleanly and the first two receiving maximum scores. He set another Olympic record of 317.85 in the combined total, becoming the first skater to clear 300 points at the Winter Olympics. This result earned him his second consecutive Olympic gold medal, a feat that had not been achieved since Dick Button's back-to-back titles in 1948 and 1952. Hanyu's medal was the 1000th awarded in the history of the Winter Olympic Games. He stood on the podium with his compatriot Shoma Uno (silver) and training mate Javier Fernández (bronze). According to Twitter's database, Hanyu was the most mentioned athlete and his win the most discussed moment of the 2018 Winter Olympics on the social media platform.

During a press conference on February 18, Hanyu revealed that he had performed his Olympic practices and programs on strong painkillers. He admitted that if he had not been taking medication, he would have been unable to attempt or land jumps. The ankle injury from November, which had led to a three-month hiatus from competing and a lowered technical difficulty of his Olympic programs, was more severe than anticipated, and he would continue to take painkillers until the conclusion of the exhibition gala. Hanyu also stated that his future competition plans were unclear since the injury had not healed yet, and he wanted to focus on full recovery. However, he said he had no intention to quit skating, and that his next goal would be the quadruple Axel, a jump that had not been landed in competition up to then:

I want to do [a quadruple Axel] because nobody else has. The jump that has never let me down is the triple Axel. I've probably put more time, practice and energy into it than to any other jump. One of my coaches has called the Axel "the king of jumps" and while being grateful to the triple for all it's given me, I'd like to aim for a quad.

=== 2018 post-Olympic events and after season honors ===
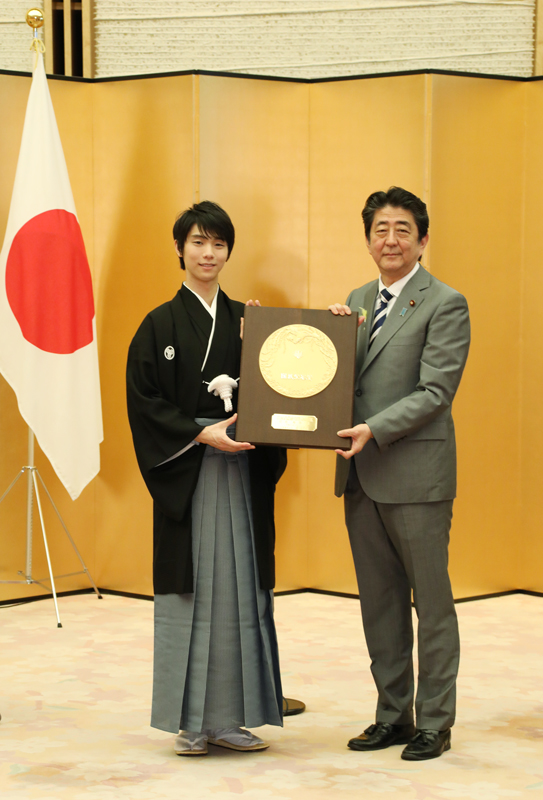
Hanyu presented with the People's Honor Award by then Japanese prime minister Shinzo Abe

On March 7, 2018, the Japan Skating Federation announced that Hanyu had decided to withdraw from the upcoming World Championships to allow his injured foot to recover. A medical examination after the Olympic Games revealed that the damaged ligaments in his right ankle as well as other unspecified injuries required at least two weeks of rest and three months of rehabilitation to heal. Despite his multiple withdrawals, Hanyu managed to place first in the world standings at the end of the 2017–18 season. In April, the ice show Continues with Wings was held at Musashino Forest Sport Plaza in Tokyo to celebrate Hanyu's win of back-to-back Olympic titles. The cast featured skaters who had influenced and inspired him throughout his career, including Evgeni Plushenko, Johnny Weir, and his choreographers Shae-Lynn Bourne and Jeffrey Buttle. After the show, Hanyu reaffirmed his desire to continue skating, announcing his plans to be ready for the 2018–19 Grand Prix series and to "compete in as many events as possible".

On April 22, he paraded in his hometown of Sendai to celebrate his consecutive Olympic gold medals with about 108,000 people in attendance. The event was funded by donations and proceeds earned from selling T-shirts that featured Hanyu's silhouettes and signature, generating an estimated 1.85 billion yen (US$16 million). The profit, worth approximately 22 million yen after deducting the total cost of the parade, was donated to the local figure skating federation for the purpose of strengthening and developing local skaters, including the foundation of a local competition named the Sendai Mayor's Cup. Six days later, Hanyu was awarded the Medal of Honor with Purple Ribbon for the second time. On June 1, it was announced that Hanyu would receive the People's Honor Award, a prestigious government commendation bestowed by the Prime Minister of Japan. However, Hanyu declined a commemorative gift which came with the award, stating that he was receiving the People's Honor Award as a representative of the people who supported him. He was the youngest among the 27 recipients since the award's creation in 1977 and the first figure skater to be given the honor. Yoshihide Suga, who had served as Chief Cabinet Secretary of Japan at that time, stated that the award had been given to appreciate Hanyu's "historic achievement" that "gave dreams and thrills to the people and hope and courage to society". In 2019, Hanyu took part in a ceremony in Sendai to unveil the design of a new monument depicting the opening pose of his free skate program Seimei, performed at his second Winter Olympics in Pyeongchang. The monument was installed next to the first one, which commemorated his Olympic win in 2014.

== 2021–22 season ==
=== Key events before the 2021–22 season ===
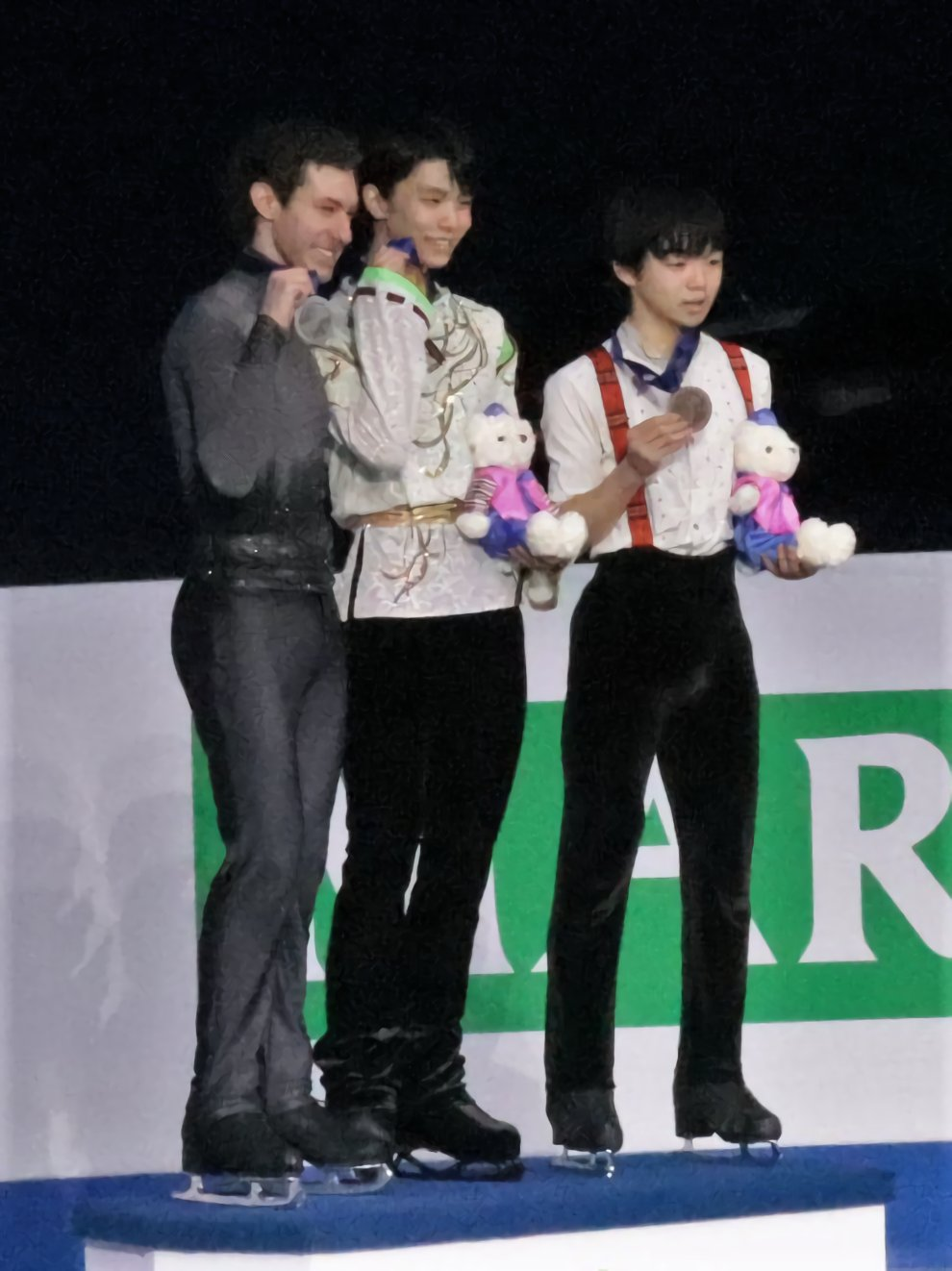
Hanyu at the 2020 Four Continents podium, having completed the Super Slam

After the introduction of the new +5/-5 judging system in 2018, Hanyu was the dominant skater in the men's short program, having scored above 100 points seven times in eleven international competitions, including three world records. He was also the only skater to score above 110 points multiple times and held the world record with 111.82 points before the 2021–22 Olympic season. The key to Hanyu's success in this competition segment was his high quality elements, well-rounded programs, and consistent Axel jump. At the 2021 World Championships, he landed his 50th triple Axel with positive GOE in his 51st international senior short program.

In the free skate segment, Hanyu set two world records in the 2018–19 season and landed five quadruple jumps in one program for the first time in his career at the 2019–20 Grand Prix Final. He also became the first to land a quad toe loop-triple Axel sequence and a quad toe loop-Euler-triple flip combination, and he was the only skater besides Nathan Chen to score above 200 points until the Olympic season. However, Hanyu's struggles with injuries continued and his performance at the 2020–21 Japan Championships was his only free skate with all-positive grades of execution under the new judging system. He suffered defeats at multiple major events, including the 2019–20 Grand Prix Final and Japan Championships, where he placed second behind Chen and Shoma Uno, respectively. Plagued by doubts, Hanyu confessed that there was a moment where he had felt tired of competing. Despite the feeling of having evolved in various aspects of his skating compared to the record-breaking performances in 2015, his scores had become lower, making him wonder if he was "no longer needed" and worried if we was being told to retire. However, he was unwilling to disappoint the people who had supported him and decided to continue competing.

In February 2020, he took a new approach by returning to his Olympic programs from 2018 and won his first gold medal at the Four Continents Championships, becoming the first male single skater to complete the Super Slam. In the beginning of the COVID-19 pandemic, Hanyu moved back from Toronto to Sendai and was coached remotely, training alone at his home rink and creating large parts of his programs' choreography himself. With his third place at the 2021 World Championships behind Chen (gold) and compatriot Yuma Kagiyama (silver), Hanyu helped to secure three Olympic berths for Japanese men and became the second male single skater after German Jan Hoffmann to win seven world medals since World War II. However, he explained that he did not feel the same drive to win the Beijing Olympics compared to the previous Winter Games, and made his goal clear for the 2021–22 season: "I am aiming for the quadruple Axel, but if the Olympics happen to be on the way to land the quad Axel, I will think about it. However, my primary goal is not to win the gold medal at the Olympics, but to succeed in four and a half revolutions."

=== Programs of the 2021–22 season ===
==== Short program: Introduction and Rondo Capriccioso ====
For the 2021–22 season, Hanyu chose to skate to Introduction and Rondo Capriccioso, Op. 28, composed by Camille Saint-Saëns. For the first time in an Olympic season, Hanyu decided to use a new short program that he had not tested previously in international competition. It was his second program to a composition by Saint-Saëns after "Notte Stellata (The Swan)", which he had performed at the exhibition gala of the 2018 Winter Olympics and other events between 2016 and 2019.

Hanyu stated that he had been searching for a piano piece for a long time and a short program "with an expression that only Yuzuru Hanyu can do". He also stated that Introduction and Rondo Capriccioso was a piece he had always wanted to skate to but felt that a piano version would suit his style better than the original composition for violin and orchestra. He consulted Japanese pianist Shinya Kiyozuka to create a special arrangement for him, stating: "I thought that if I used an original piano version by Kiyozuka, who gave me the energy to live and skate when I was going through a very hard time last season, I would be able to skate more comfortably." He wished for a piece that was overflowing with passion, but also carried some sorrow and delicacy. Hanyu had already skated to Kiyozuka's piano version of the Japanese song "Haru yo, koi" in various exhibition galas since 2018 and performed with him in a live show collaboration at the 2018 Fantasy on Ice.

The foundation of the choreography was laid by Jeffrey Buttle. In order to improve the program regarding different aspects such as the storyline and expression, Hanyu also consulted his coaches Brian Orser, Tracy Wilson, and choreographer Shae-Lynn Bourne. The program reflects his memories and feelings from the time when he did not make any progress with the quadruple Axel, how he tried to push forward, and eventually caught something in his grasp as shown by the final pose. Hanyu noted that regarding the base value of the technical elements, it might not have been the most difficult program he was capable of, but he had increased the complexity of transitions between the elements, stating: "There is only about one crossover before each jump, there are hardly any crossovers in this program. I certainly want these aspects to be seen. In terms of expression, it might not be as refined as my signature programs like 'Ballade No. 1' or 'Seimei' yet, but it is a program with a specific story and feelings woven into the music. I'd like to make it a program where everything can be seen, not only the jumps." (Note: A crossover is a basic two-footed skating stroke to generate speed and negotiate corners of the rink. According to former American figure skater John Misha Petkevich's statement in his book from 1989, a program without crossovers is "virtually unthinkable".)

The costume for the program was created by Satomi Ito. Hanyu requested a design using cool colors and a choker-like detail in blue. Ito suggested a style that resembled the costume design of Hanyu's previous short program to "Otoñal" by Raúl Di Blasio from the 2019–20 season, and added some golden feathers at its finalization. She described the costume as a "phoenix veiled in blue flames" that "only Hanyu can pull off."

==== Free skate program: Heaven and Earth (天と地と) ====
For the free skate, Hanyu decided to reuse the program Heaven and Earth (天と地と, Ten to Chi to) from the previous season and incorporate the quadruple Axel as the first jump. The music is a medley of the opening themes of the two taiga dramas Ten to Chi to (1969) and Shin Heike Monogatari (1972), composed by Isao Tomita. At the 2020–21 Japan Championships, Hanyu performed a clean free skate and set a new unofficial national record score with the program. In his opinion, a performance with clean and seamless jump execution is essential to convey the meaning and expression of the program.

Heaven and Earth was choreographed remotely by Shae-Lynn Bourne, who arranged online meetings and exchanged multiple video mails with Hanyu. Due to the lack of presence-based coaching during the corona pandemic, Hanyu had to work out many parts of the choreography himself. At their first meeting, he already had a concept of the program in mind, including the placement of the technical elements with the required space and breathing.

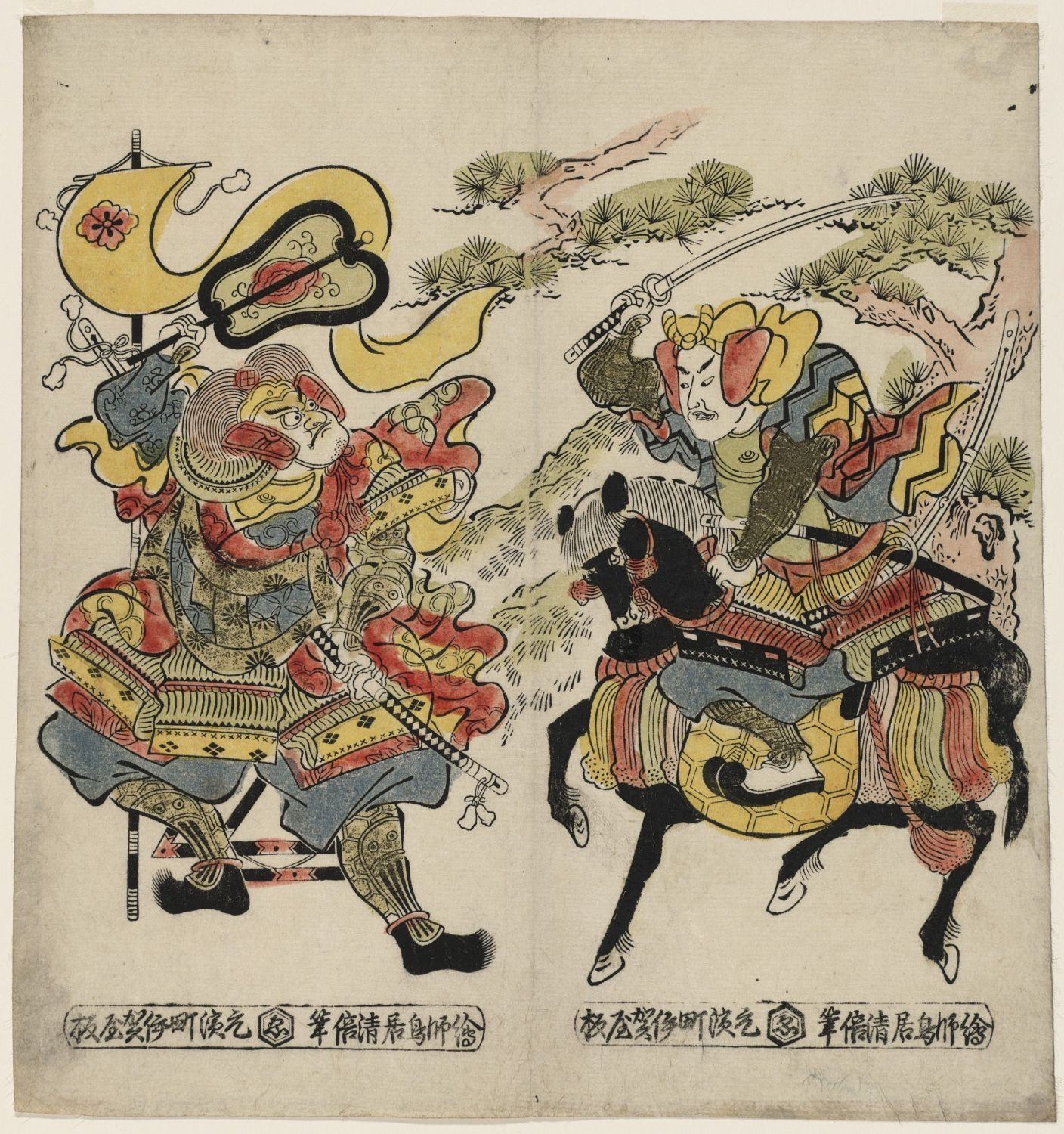
Illustration of the single combat between Takeda Shingen (left) and Uesugi Kenshin (right) in the fourth battle of Kawanakajima in 1561

In the program, Hanyu portrayed Uesugi Kenshin, a daimyō from the Sengoku period of Japan in the 16th century, who was said to be the most powerful warlord of his time and known for his belief in the Buddhist war god Bishamonten. However, Kenshin was aware of the hardships and sacrifices attached to it and eventually chose to become a monk. Hanyu's motivation behind the program choice was his strong resonance with Kenshin's situation as well as his values and approach towards battle. In an interview with Sports Hochi in August 2022, Hanyu named Heaven and Earth as the favorite among his past figure skating programs.

The first part depicts the fourth battle of Kawanakajima in 1561 between the two daimyōs Uesugi Kenshin and his rival Takeda Shingen. Both aimed to take control over a plain in the Shinano Province, located in the area of today's Nagano city, where Hanyu debuted the program in competition. The step sequence is a visualization of Kenshin's sword dance during the single combat with Shingen, which Bourne described as a "battle of beauty". The second part of the program shows Kenshin's reflection on the battle and his life until that point, including his inner conflict of no longer wanting to fight, but being forced to continue in order to protect his loved ones.

The program concludes with Kenshin entering priesthood and reaching a state of enlightenment, which is illustrated by the final spins and the ending pose. For Bourne, that pose is a "true expression of 'heaven and earth'—the feet are firmly attached to the earth (represented by the rink), and the hands are stretched out to the sky. It is an image of ascending towards the light of heaven." The original Japanese title of the program 天と地と (ten to chi to) literally translates to 'heaven and earth and', which indicates the existence of a third element. In Taoism, heaven (天) and earth (地) are thought to maintain the two poles of the Three Realms of reality, with the middle realm occupied by humanity (人), which Hanyu associated with people and, as an example, himself: "For me, it is 'ten to chi no hito' (a man between heaven and earth). My arm is the transition between where I am, and the sky above, and the earth below."

For the music editing, Hanyu again consulted Keiichi Yano, who created a total of 18 versions in a span of two and a half weeks. For Hanyu, it was important to fully utilize the sound of the Japanese lute biwa to structure the program and underline both Kenshin's determination to fight and his reflection on the battle. Hanyu also asked Yano to add the sound of the half-tube zither koto to make the program "even more 'Japonesque'".

The costume was designed by Satomi Ito, who took the family crest of the Uesugi clan as inspiration for the costume details, including the golden sparrows on the back of the top. Hanyu asked Ito to base the costume design on the image of the traditional Japanese pantskirt hakama in a color scheme of greenish-blue. However, the hakama was difficult to realize as a light figure skating costume, so Ito used the obi, a belt usually worn with a kimono or keikogi, to reproduce the visual appearance of a hakama. For the Olympic season, the color of the obi was changed from blue to black.

=== 2021 pre-Olympic events ===
Statistics before the 2022 Olympics
Personal bests
- Short program: 111.82 (WR)
- Free skate: 212.99
- Combined total: 322.59

Technical content
- Types of quad jumps: 4T, 4S, 4Lo, 4Lz
- Quad jumps in SP: 2 (1 in 2nd half)
- Quad jumps in FS: 5 (3 in 2nd half)
- Only successfully executed jumps and layouts listed (not planned content)

Approaching the 2021–22 Olympic season, Hanyu was assigned to the Grand Prix series and scheduled for the NHK Trophy and Rostelecom Cup. However, on November 4, 2021, the Japan Skating Federation announced that Hanyu had withdrawn from the NHK Trophy after injuring his right ankle ligament during a fall in practice. On November 17, the JSF also confirmed his withdrawal from the Rostelecom Cup. Hanyu later revealed that the injury had occurred during one of his free skate run-throughs; when setting up for a quad Salchow consecutively after a quad Axel attempt, the edge of his blade did not glide properly and got stuck in the ice, resulting in the fall. He explained that he had some maintenance issues and just sharpened his blades prior to the accident. Shortly after the injury, he had been forced off practice for one month, suffering from a fever due to esophagitis.

In December, Hanyu returned to competition at the 2021–22 Japan Championships. In his first practice session, he attempted multiple quad Axels, one of them with a two-footed landing and slightly short on rotation. According to him, the focus was on maintaining a solid axis during the jump rather than maximizing the torque. The next day, Hanyu debuted his short program Introduction and Rondo Capriccioso with a clean performance, receiving maximum grades of execution for the step sequence and the final spin combination as well as a perfect 10.00 for the interpretation component. He took the lead after the short program with a new event record of 111.31 points, only half a point shy of his own world record set at the 2020 Four Continents Championships. In the free skate, Hanyu attempted the quadruple Axel in competition for the first time, but it was landed on two feet and marked as downgraded by the technical panel, lacking more than a half revolution at the landing. However, he managed to execute the rest of the program flawlessly, earning 211.05 points for his performance. With another event record of 322.36 points in the combined total, he won his sixth gold medal at the Japan Figure Skating Championships, tying Takeshi Honda's record of most national titles in the last 50 years. He finished ahead of Shoma Uno (silver) and Yuma Kagiyama (bronze), who both qualified alongside Hanyu for the 2022 Winter Olympics and World Championships. In an interview after the competition, Hanyu shared his thoughts on winning three Olympic gold medals in a row for the first time:

The Olympics to me was a dream through to PyeongChang. I won gold there and in Sochi; that's the dream I had as a child and was my lifelong goal. Honestly, I wasn't thinking about a three-peat. But I recognize the position I'm in, the challenge I'm taking on, and seeing all these athletes working so hard towards the Olympics ... I'm the only figure skater who has the opportunity to win a third straight gold medal. This might not be the dream I've always had, but I want to show a renewed strength—one different from last time and the time before that.

=== 2022 Winter Olympics ===
Hanyu's performances at the 2022 Winter Olympics
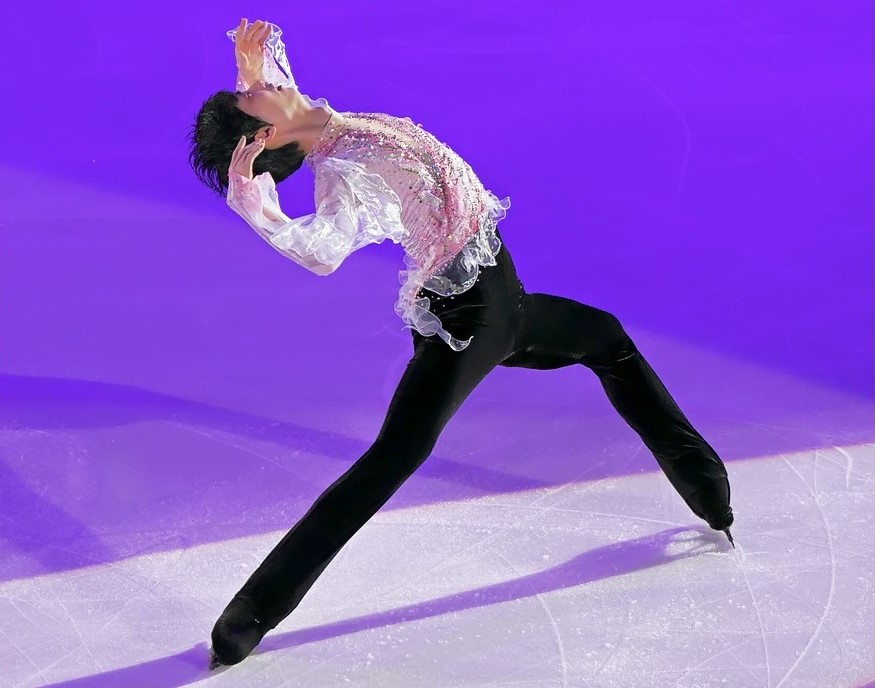
- Hanyu's gala performance to "Haru yo, koi"
- Short program: Rondo Capriccioso
- Free skating: Heaven and Earth
- Exhibition gala: "Haru yo, koi"
- Videos from the official Olympic Channel on YouTube

At the 2022 Winter Olympics, Hanyu was scheduled for the men's singles event as his first international competition of the season. His arrival was highly anticipated, especially among his large fanbase in China, and closely followed by the media. On February 6, two days prior to the competition, he arrived at Beijing airport being surrounded by officials in protective gear, who received criticism for the lack of social distancing amidst the corona pandemic.

In the short program, Hanyu performed Introduction and Rondo Capriccioso for the first time in international competition. However, he missed his opening quadruple Salchow jump due to his blade getting caught in a hole in the ice. The costly error put him in eighth place with 95.15 points, his lowest short program placement since 2013 and also his lowest score in the segment since the 2019 World Championships. In the free skate, he fell on his two opening jumps, a quadruple Axel and a quad Salchow. After the two mistakes, he delivered a clean performance, placing third in the free skate and fourth overall with a total score of 283.21 points, behind Nathan Chen (gold) and his Japanese compatriots Yuma Kagiyama (silver) and Shoma Uno (bronze). It was Hanyu's first off-podium finish since the 2014 NHK Trophy. His quad Axel attempt received the jump's base value before being reduced for under-rotation, making it the closest attempt in competition until then. In September 2022, American Ilia Malinin successfully landed the first ratified one at the U.S. International Classic, who cited Hanyu as his inspiration to attempt the jump.

Upon the conclusion of the men's singles event, it was revealed that Hanyu had re-injured his right ankle in practice the day before the free skate and competed on painkillers. On February 14, he shared more details about his injury, stating that the sprain had been worse than initially assumed, and that if it had been a competition other than the Olympics, he might have withdrawn as his doctor had suggested him to rest his ankle for ten days. However, Hanyu decided to participate in the exhibition gala and also performed a medley of past programs to the media and staff members at the practice rink. Asked about his future, he did not rule out the possibility to return to the Olympic Games, stating: "If you ask me whether these were my last Games, I don't know. The Olympics is a special place, one of a kind. It's a competition, a challenge, that you want to take on even if you're hurt. There's no other place like that for a figure skater. There is a part of me that does want to skate here again."

=== 2022 post-Olympic events and after season honors ===
On March 1, 2022, the Japan Skating Federation announced Hanyu's withdrawal from the World Championships, stating that the injury he had suffered at the Beijing Olympics was not fully healed. From May to June, he joined the 2022 Fantasy on Ice tour as one of the lead cast members to four prefectures across Japan. The tour was live-screened in 90 movie theaters nationwide as well as six theaters in Taiwan. During the tour, he jumped multiple quadruple toe loops, indicating that his recovery had been going smoothly.

On July 19, Hanyu had called a press conference, where he announced his decision to "step away" from competitive figure skating at amateur level and turn professional, stating that "he had achieved everything he could achieve" and would no longer "seek those kinds of evaluations." He stressed his intention to continue pursuing his "ideal skating" and dream of completing the quadruple Axel as a professional athlete at an ice show or other non-competitive setting. Despite being unable to provide details on his future plans, he expressed his hope "to draw even people who don't normally come out to watch skating". The press conference was live-streamed nationally and covered by major national and international media. On July 21, Hanyu released a message through the Japan Skating Federation, and his profile was removed from the federation's list of advanced skaters as requested by ANA, his affiliated organization at that time.

On October 11, Hanyu was announced to be among the recipients of the 70th Kikuchi Kan Prize, a prestigious award for outstanding achievements in cultural activities, named after Japanese author Kikuchi Kan. Hanyu was selected for his accomplishments in the men's singles discipline, including his win of all major international competitions and back-to-back Olympic titles, as well as his inspirational attitude to continue challenging the quadruple Axel. He is the second figure skater to receive the award after Mao Asada in 2017. The award ceremony was held on December 2 in Tokyo. In a video message, Hanyu expressed his gratitude and confessed: "Most of my life was a path to dreams, a series of hopes and despairs. However, I want to make every choice meaningful. Even if I fail or get injured by my choices, I want them to have a meaning."

== Olympic program challenges ==
External videos
- Hanyu's Olympic program challenges
- Seimei on Yuzuru Hanyu's YouTube channel (from SharePractice livestream event)
- Rondo Capriccioso on NTV's YouTube channel (two alternative recordings from 24HTV show)

Hanyu started off his professional skating career by challenging two of his past Olympic programs. On August 10, he shared a two-hour long practice livestream on his newly launched YouTube channel. In the course of that practice session, he attempted his free skate program Seimei from the 2018 Winter Olympics three times and skated a clean performance at last attempt featuring four quadruple jumps. At the end of the session, he remarked: "My goal this time was to skate a clean performance of Seimei with the same technical layout as at the Olympics in Pyeongchang. Well, I had such a strong will to prove that I was better than that time." The practice stream was viewed live by more than 100,000 people and reached a total of one million views in 8.5 hours.

In the 45th edition of the annual charity program 24-hour TV "Love Saves the Earth", broadcast by Nippon TV on August 27, Hanyu challenged his short program Introduction and Rondo Capriccioso from the 2022 Winter Olympics to overcome the negative memories of the event. This time, he succeeded at the opening quad Salchow and performed a clean program with two quadruple jumps and a triple Axel. In a subsequent interview he expressed his feelings about the performance: "I made a mistake at the Olympics—in a way, it was a trauma. That's why I thought, I'd like to challenge it again. I feel that, for the first time, I was able to skate this program to perfection. It was one of those programs that I was too scared to take a step on. But finally, I feel that I was able to get over it and move forward again. I hope that, even if it is only for a second, it will be an opportunity for everyone to move forward." On February 26, 2023, he again challenged the program in his solo ice show Gift at Tokyo Dome in front of a record audience of 35,000 spectators. He recreated the setting of the Beijing Olympics with a preceding six-minute warm-up session and skated another clean performance with the same technical content, including a successful opening quad Salchow.

== Legacy ==
Hanyu's achievements at the Olympics earned him spots in numerous prestigious lists and international athlete rankings, including Forbes' 30 Under 30 Asia (2018), ESPN's World Fame 100 and The Dominant 20, and Marca's 100 Best Male Sportsmen of the 21st Century. In 2024, Hanyu was featured in ESPN's top 25 selection of the greatest Olympic athletes of the 21st century, being the highest-ranked figure skater in the list (10th place) ahead of three-time Olympic ice dance champions Tessa Virtue and Scott Moir (11th place).

In 2022, Hanyu was the sixth most-searched athlete on Google Search worldwide behind Novak Djokovic, Rafael Nadal, Serena Williams (all tennis), Manti Te'o (American football), and Shaun White (snowboard). Various news outlets and magazines such as Nikkei Asia and International Figure Skating noted that Hanyu's exit from the competitive circuit marks the "end of an era". Juliet Macur of The New York Times remarked that "we may never see another skater like Yuzuru Hanyu". Numerous sports figures from and outside figure skating reacted to Hanyu's announcement with gratitude and praise, including Japanese baseball player Shohei Ohtani, gymnast Kōhei Uchimura, and tennis player Naomi Osaka. Thomas Bach, president of the International Olympic Committee, sent a personal message to Hanyu through the IOC's official media account on Twitter: "Congratulations on an outstanding Olympic career. You are a true Olympic champion. Good luck for the next steps in your skating career. We will keep following you and look forward to seeing you again."

== Detailed results ==
- **^team** – Team event
- World records highlighted in **bold and italic**
- Small medals for the short program and free skating are only awarded at ISU Championships.
- Medals at team events are awarded for the team result only.

Results in the 2013–14 season
Date	Event	SP		FS		Total		Details
Date	Event	P	Score	P	Score	P	Score	Details
Oct 4–6, 2013	(Finland) 2013 Finlandia Trophy	1	84.66	1	180.93	1	265.59	Details
Oct 25–27, 2013	2013 Skate Canada International	3	80.40	2	154.40	2	234.80	Details
Nov 15–17, 2013	(France) 2013 Trophée Éric Bompard	2	95.37	2	168.22	2	263.59	Details
Dec 5–8, 2013	(Japan) 2013–14 Grand Prix Final	1	**99.84**	1	193.41	1	293.25	Details
Dec 20–23, 2013	2013–14 Japan Championships	1	103.10	1	194.70	1	297.80	Details
Feb 6–9, 2014	(Russia) 2014 Winter Olympics ^{team}	1	97.98	–	–	5	–	Details
Feb 13–14, 2014	(Russia) 2014 Winter Olympics	1	**101.45**	1	178.64	1	280.09	Details
Mar 24–30, 2014	(Japan) 2014 World Championships	3	91.24	1	191.35	1	282.59	Details

Results in the 2017–18 season
Date	Event	SP		FS		Total		Details
Date	Event	P	Score	P	Score	P	Score	Details
Sep 20–23, 2017	(Canada) 2017 CS Autumn Classic International	1	**112.72**	5	155.52	2	268.24	Details
Oct 20–22, 2017	(Russia) 2017 Rostelecom Cup	2	94.85	1	195.92	2	290.77	Details
Feb 16–17, 2018	(South Korea) 2018 Winter Olympics	1	111.68	2	206.17	1	317.85	Details

Results in the 2021–22 season
Date	Event	SP		FS		Total		Details
Date	Event	P	Score	P	Score	P	Score	Details
Dec 22–26, 2021	2021–22 Japan Championships	1	111.31	1	211.05	1	322.36	Details
Feb 8–10, 2022	(China) 2022 Winter Olympics	8	95.15	3	188.06	4	283.21	Details

== See also ==
- List of Olympic medalists in figure skating
- Figure skating at the 2014 Winter Olympics (men's singles)
- Figure skating at the 2018 Winter Olympics (men's singles)
- Figure skating at the 2022 Winter Olympics (men's singles)

== Notes and references ==
=== Books and magazines cited ===
- CWW official (April 16, 2018). 「Continues ～with Wings～」愛蔵版ブック [Continues with Wings – collector's edition book] (in Japanese). Shibuya, Tokyo: Axel Entermedia Co., Ltd. ID 687.
- FS Cultural Book (February 17, 2021). 独占インタビュー&寄稿 – 伊藤聡美（衣装デザイナー） [Exclusive interviews & contributions – Satomi Ito (costume designer)]. フィギュアスケート・カルチュラルブック2020–2021 氷上の創造者 (Figure Skate Cultural Book 2020–2021 Creator on Ice) (in Japanese). Chiyoda, Tokyo: Kadokawa Future Publishing. ch. 2. ISBN 978-4047364950.
- FS Life (December 24, 2015). ニッポンのフィギュアスケートをつくる人・支える人「サウンドデザイナー 矢野桂一」 ["Sound Designer Keiichi Yano" who makes and supports Japanese figure skating]. フィギュアスケートLife (Figure Skate Life) (mook) (in Japanese). Vol. 4. Minato, Tokyo: Fusosha Publishing. ch. 8. ISBN 978-4594610234.
- FS Team Japan (September 29, 2021). シェイ=リーン・ボーン「全身全霊の演技を」 [Shae-Lynn Bourne "Acting with the whole body"]. フィギュアスケート日本代表 2021 ファンブック (Figure Skating Team Japan 2021 Fan Book) (in Japanese). Chiyoda, Tokyo: Yamato Keikokusha Co. ch. 2. ISBN 978-4635907460.
- Hasegawa, Hitomi (December 10, 2013). 2013 Winter 男子シングル読本 [2013 Winter men's singles edition]. フィギュアスケートDays Plus (Figure Skate Days Plus) (in Japanese). Tokyo: ダイエックス出版 (Dai-X Publishing). ISBN 978-4812535714.
- Hasegawa, Hitomi (2017). "Special Interview ジェフリー・バトル (Jeffrey Buttle)". フィギュアスケートLife (Figure Skate Life) (mook) (in Japanese). Vol. 11. Minato, Tokyo: Fusosha Publishing. ch. 9. ISBN 978-4594612078.
- Ito, Satomi (April 18, 2022). Muse on Ice (in Japanese). Chiyoda, Tokyo: G.B. Corporation. ISBN 978-4910428154.
- Ito, Yamane (January 24, 2018). 氷上秘話 フィギュアスケート楽曲・プログラムの知られざる世界 [Untold Story on Ice: The Unknown World of Figure Skating Music and Programs] (in Japanese). Shinjuku, Tokyo: Toho Publishing. ISBN 978-4809415494.
- Kiss & Cry (June 22, 2021). 2020-2021シーズンを終えた羽生結弦選手に、独占インタビューを敢行! シーズン中に得たもの、「羽生結弦」にしかできない演技について [Exclusive interview with Yuzuru Hanyu after the 2020-2021 season! About the performance that only "Yuzuru Hanyu" can do]. Kiss & Cry (in Japanese). Vol. 39. Ginza, Tokyo: Tokyo News Agency. ch. 1. ISBN 978-4867012727.
- Noguchi, Yoshie (January 21, 2021b). 矢野桂一「音楽を身体に染み込ませて」 [Keiichi Yano "Ingraneating music into the body"]. Sports Graphic Number (in Japanese). Vol. 1019. Chiyoda, Tokyo: Bungeishunjū. ch. 1. JAN 4910268510219.
- Number (November 21, 2013). 羽生結弦 五輪シーズンの決意を語る（2）スケートに捧げた青春 [Yuzuru Hanyu: Talk about his determination for the Olympic season (2) Youth dedicated to skating]. Sports Graphic Number PLUS (December 2013) (in Japanese). Chiyoda, Tokyo: Bungeishunjū. ch. 2. ISBN 978-4160081888.
- Oriyama, Toshimi (2017a). Fantasy on Ice 2017 Official Program (pamphlet) (in Japanese). Chiyoda, Tokyo: Tenprint Co., Ltd.
- Petkevich, John Misha (March 1, 1989). "Figure Skating: Championship Techniques". Sports Illustrated. New York City: Penguin Books. ISBN 978-0452262096.
- Russell, Susan D. (September 6, 2022). "Yuzuru Hanyu – An icon leaves the competitive stage". International Figure Skating. Denville Township, New Jersey. pp. 22–33. IFSISS22-05.
- Utsunomiya, Naoko (June 22, 2016). 羽生結弦の扉 [Yuzuru Hanyu's Door]. オール讀物 (All Read) (in Japanese). Chiyoda, Tokyo: Bungeishunjū. ch. 4. JAN 4910021030763.
- Yoshida, Manubu (June 16, 2021). 羽生結弦 2020–2021 シーズンハイライト [Yuzuru Hanyu 2020–2021 Season Highlights]. フィギュアスケートマガジン (Figure Skate Magazine) (in Japanese). Vol. 5. Chūō, Tokyo: BBM Sports. ch. 1. ISBN 978-4583626734.
