= Keiichi Yano (sound designer) =

Japanese sound designer (born 1957)

- 矢野 桂一
- Born: April 8, 1957 (age 69); Fukuoka Prefecture, Japan
- Occupations: Sound designer; Music programmer
- Years active: Since 1975
- Known for: Figure skating music editing; Sound design for the Yamaha Music Foundation

Keiichi Yano (矢野 桂一, Yano Keiichi; born April 8, 1957) is a Japanese sound designer and music programmer. Since 1978, he has been in charge of sound at the Tokyo branch of the Yamaha Music Foundation. He is best known for his works in the sport of figure skating.

== Career ==
Keiichi Yano was born on April 8, 1957, in Fukuoka Prefecture. In 1957, at 18 years old, he entered the business of sound design and music editing. Three years later, he joined the Tokyo branch of the Yamaha Music Foundation and has been in charge of sound since then. At the 1985 World Championships in Tokyo and the 1985 NHK Trophy in Kobe, he got involved in the sport of figure skating for the first time. The following years, he worked as a sound director at various national and international skating competitions, including the 1998 Winter Olympics in Nagano. Yano's first involvement in the musical arrangement for a figure skating program was the short program "Fantastic Tango" of Japanese skater Midori Ito in the 1988–89 season, which contributed to her victory at the 1989 World Championships. In 2002, Shizuka Arakawa, the 2006 Olympic champion in women's singles, reached out to him with a request for another major program edit and music adjustment. Since then, Yano has worked with elite skaters across Japan, including the world champions Daisuke Takahashi and Shoma Uno. He also joined the sound department at various domestic ice shows like Fantasy on Ice and Dreams on Ice.

One of Yano's most notable collaborations in music editing and sound design is a series of works for two-time Olympic champion Yuzuru Hanyu. Their first encounter was the edit of Hanyu's Olympic free skate program Romeo and Juliet in 2013. Hanyu's recognition of a minor connecting noise in the sound recording made Yano realize the skater's high degree of musical sensitivity and seriousness about sound, which motivated Yano for later works. Among their most memorable collaborations were Hanyu's following two Olympic free skate programs Seimei and Heaven and Earth (天と地と). While Yano usually creates two to three versions of the music edit for a skating program, it was 33 different versions for Seimei (2015–2020) and 18 versions for Heaven and Earth (2021). Since Hanyu's move from competitive to professional skating in July 2022, Yano has also been involved in all his solo ice show productions, including Prologue, Gift, Repray, Echoes of Life, and Realive.

== Collaborations in figure skating ==
- Shizuka Arakawa
- Yuzuru Hanyu
- Midori Ito
- Kanako Murakami
- Akiko Suzuki
- Daisuke Takahashi
- Shoma Uno
