= Keiichi Kimura (photographer) =

Japanese photographer (born 1935)

Keiichi Kimura (木村 恵一, Kimura Keiichi; born 1935) is a Japanese photographer.
