= List of career achievements by Yuzuru Hanyu =

Japanese figure skater (born 1994)

Yuzuru Hanyu
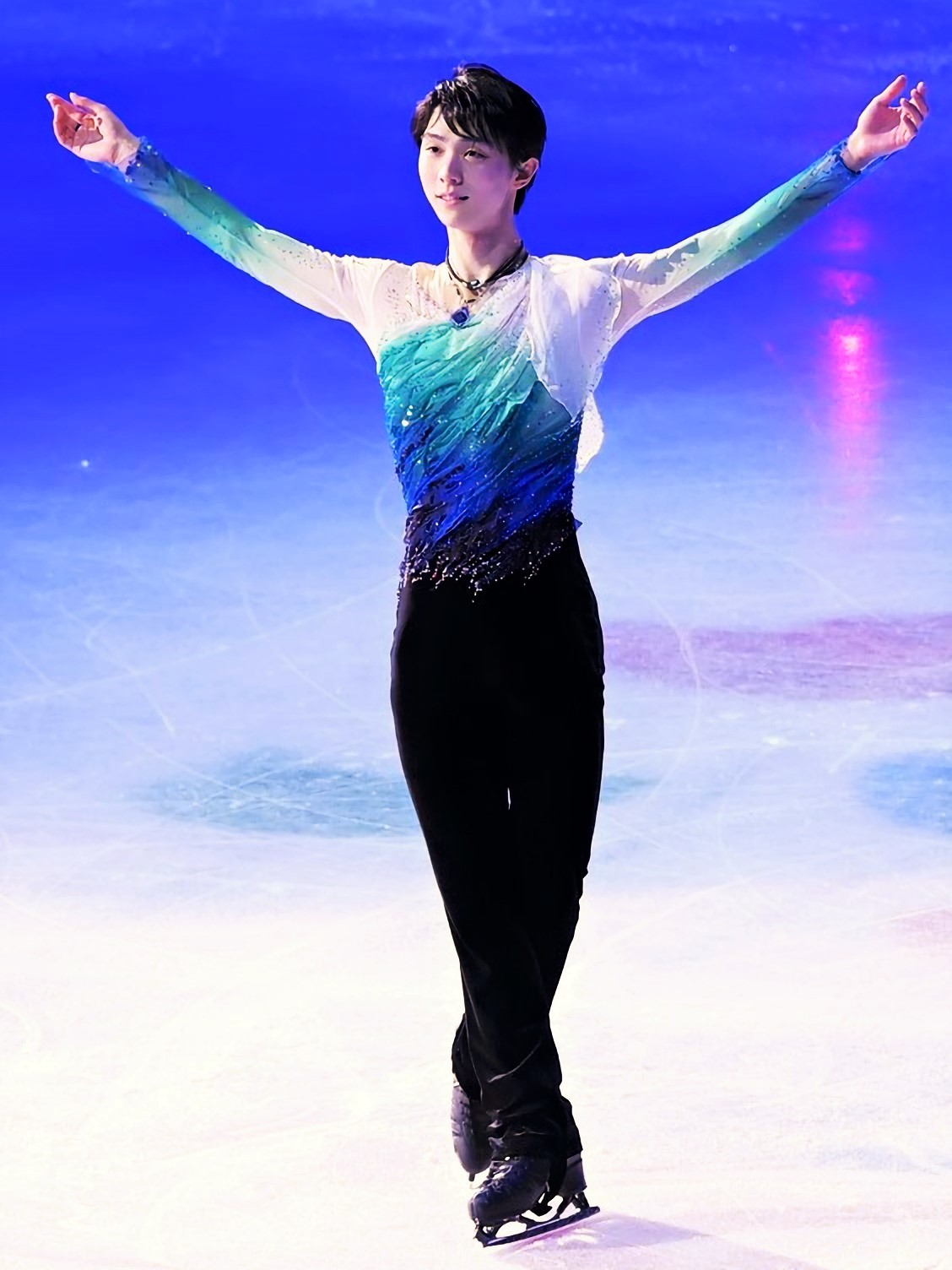
- Hanyu at the 2017 World Championships in Helsinki, winning his second world title

Yuzuru Hanyu article series
- Skating career: Olympic seasons; Career achievements; Figure skating programs
- Other works: Bibliography
- Solo ice shows: Prologue; Gift; Repray Tour; Echoes of Life Tour; Realive; White Box Tour
- Ensemble ice shows: Fantasy on Ice; Continues with Wings; Yuzuru Hanyu Notte Stellata

Yuzuru Hanyu is a Japanese figure skater and ice show producer who competed in the men's singles discipline from 2004 to 2022 and turned professional on July 19, 2022. At junior and senior level (2008–2022), he won a total of 59 medals in 72 competitions, among them 37 golds. He is the first male single skater in 66 years since American Dick Button to win back-to-back Olympic titles (2014, 2018), and also the youngest and first Olympic champion from Asia in that discipline. He is a two-time World champion (2014, 2017), a six-time Japanese national champion (2012–2015, 2020–2021), and the first single skater to win four consecutive Grand Prix Finals (2014–2017). With his win at the 2020 Four Continents Championships, he became the first male single skater to complete the Super Slam, having won all major international junior and senior titles in the course of his career. He is also the only male single skater besides German Jan Hoffmann to win seven world championship medals in the post-war era since 1946.

Hanyu broke world records 19 times, the most in singles since the introduction of the ISU Judging System in 2003. He was the first skater to score over 100 points in the short program, 200 in the free skating, and 300 in the combined total score, and holds the historical world record in all three competition segments in men's singles. (Note: With the change of the ISU Judging System in 2018, the International Skating Union decided to start the recording of highest scores statistics from zero and declared all records historical that were achieved before the 2018–19 season.) He was awarded a total of 30 perfect scores for technical elements and program components, 10 of them for his signature triple Axel jump, and was the first skater to land a quadruple loop jump in international competition. As a professional, Hanyu became the first skater to produce and present a solo ice show (Prologue 2022) and a solo ice show tour (Repray Tour 2023–24). His second solo show Gift (2023) set a new audience record for ice shows with 35,000 spectators at Tokyo Dome.

In recognition of his achievements, Hanyu has received numerous awards and accolades, including the People's Honor Award (2018), bestowed by the Prime Minister of Japan, Japan's Medal of Honor with purple ribbon (2014, 2018), and the Kikuchi Kan Prize (2022). He was the first figure skater to be nominated for the Laureus World Sports Award, selected in the category Comeback of the Year (2019), and was named the Most Valuable Skater at the inaugural ISU Skating Awards (2020). He was also featured in prestigious lists, such as Forbes' 30 Under 30 Asia (2018), and made it to ESPN's top 10 selection of the greatest Olympians of the 21st century in 2024.

== World record scores ==
Yuzuru Hanyu has scored 19 world records in international competition, the most among single skaters since the introduction of the ISU Judging System in 2003. He set new highest scores seven times in the +5/-5 Grade of Execution System, three in the short program, two in the free skating, and another two in the combined total score. At the 2018 Grand Prix of Helsinki, he scored records in all three competition segments at one event. Before the 2018–19 season, he set twelve highest historical scores, seven in the short program, three in the free skating, and two in the combined total score, holding the historical records in all three competition segments. At the 2015 NHK Trophy and the 2015–16 Grand Prix Final, he set new highest scores in all segments at back-to-back events.

- Historical record scores achieved in the +3/-3 GOE System highlighted in **bold and italic**
- ISU highest scores and highest historical scores are recognized as world records by Guinness World Records.

Chronological list of world record scores in the +5/-5 GOE System
Date	Score	Segment	Event	Notes
Nov 3, 2018	106.69	Short program	2018 Grand Prix of Helsinki	Hanyu broke Shoma Uno's record from September 2018.
Nov 4, 2018	190.43	Free skating	2018 Grand Prix of Helsinki	Hanyu broke Nathan Chen's record from October 2018.
Nov 4, 2018	297.12	Combined total	2018 Grand Prix of Helsinki	
Nov 16, 2018	110.53	Short program	2018 Rostelecom Cup	Hanyu became the first skater to score above 110 points in the short program in the +5/-5 GOE System.
Mar 23, 2019	206.10	Free skating	2019 World Championships	Hanyu broke Shoma Uno's record from February 2019 and became the first skater to score above 200 points in the free skating in the +5/-5 GOE System.
Mar 23, 2019	300.97	Combined total	2019 World Championships	Hanyu became the first skater to score above 300 points in the combined total in the +5/-5 GOE System.
Feb 7, 2020	111.82	Short program	2020 Four Continents Championships	

Chronological list of world record scores in the +3/-3 GOE System
Date	Score	Segment	Event	Notes
Oct 19, 2012	95.07	Short program	2012 Skate America	Hanyu broke Daisuke Takahashi's record from April 2012.
Nov 23, 2012	95.32	Short program	2012 NHK Trophy	
Dec 5, 2013	99.84	Short program	2013–14 Grand Prix Final	Hanyu broke Patrick Chan's record from November 2013.
Feb 13, 2014	101.45	Short program	2014 Winter Olympics	Hanyu became the first skater to score above 100 points in the short program.
Nov 27, 2015	106.33	Short program	2015 NHK Trophy	
Nov 28, 2015	216.07	Free skating	2015 NHK Trophy	Hanyu broke Patrick Chan's record from November 2013 and became the first skater to score above 200 points in the free skating.
Nov 28, 2015	322.40	Combined total	2015 NHK Trophy	Hanyu broke Patrick Chan's record from November 2013 and became the first skater to score above 300 points in the combined total.
Dec 10, 2015	110.95	Short program	2015–16 Grand Prix Final	Hanyu became the first and only skater to score above 110 points in the short program in the +3/-3 GOE System.
Dec 12, 2015	219.48	Free skating	2015–16 Grand Prix Final	
Dec 12, 2015	**330.43**	Combined total	2015–16 Grand Prix Final	Hanyu became the first and only skater to score above 330 points in the combined total in the +3/-3 GOE System.
Apr 1, 2017	**223.20**	Free skating	2017 World Championships	Hanyu became the first and only skater to score above 220 points in the free skating in the +3/-3 GOE System.
Sep 22, 2017	**112.72**	Short program	2017 CS Autumn Classic	

== Firsts and other records ==
=== Competitive skating ===
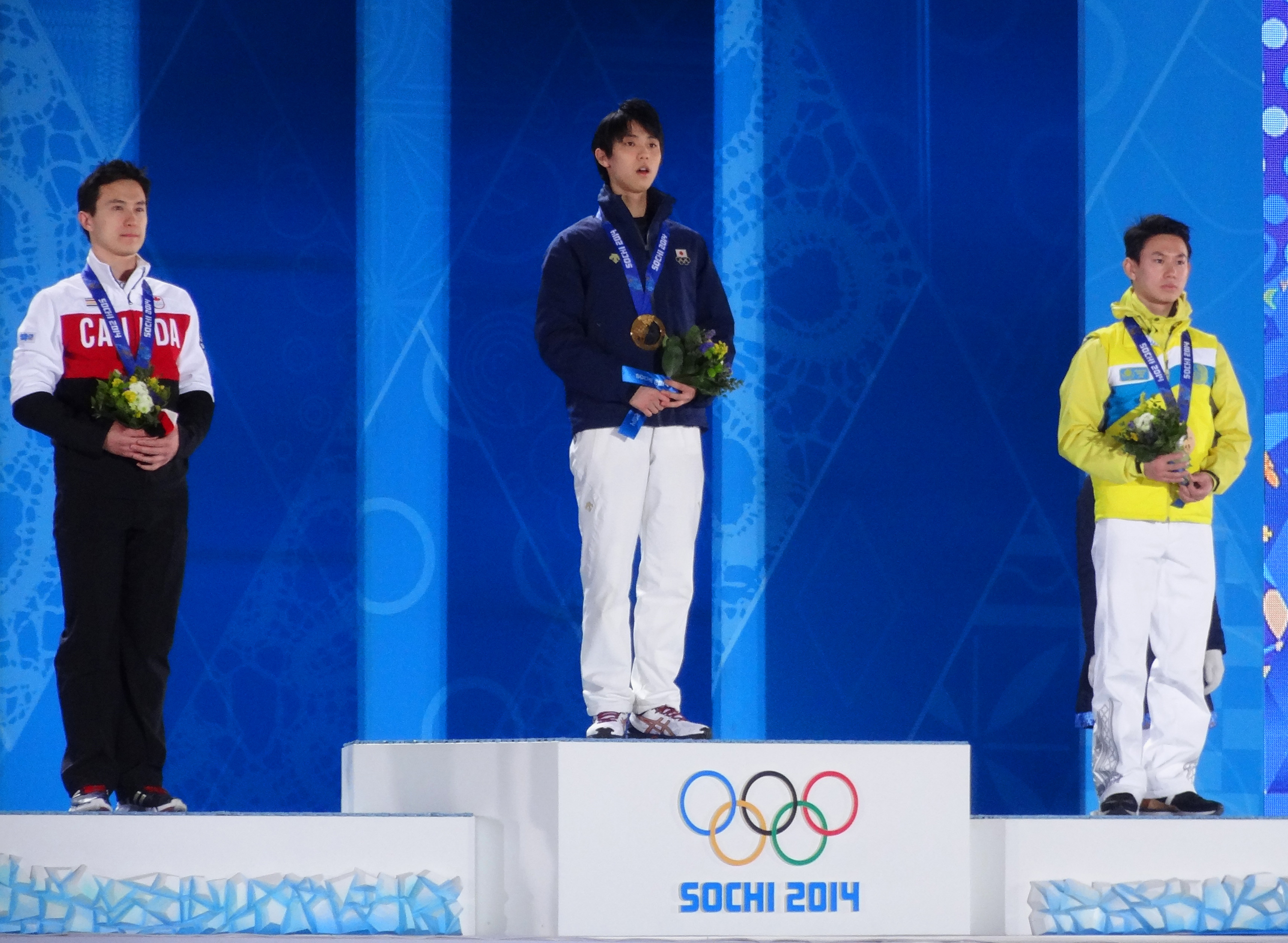
Hanyu with Patrick Chan (left) and Denis Ten (right) at the 2014 Winter Olympics podium

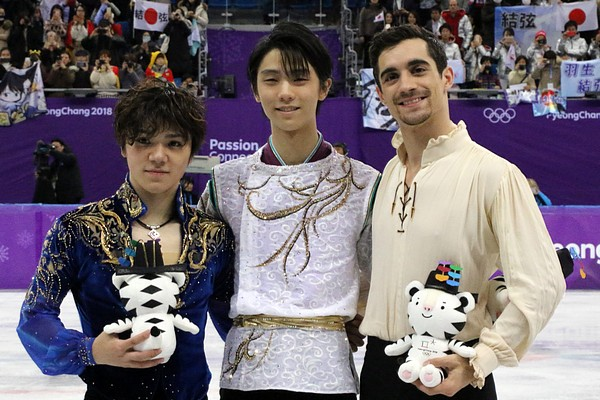
Hanyu with Shoma Uno (left) and Javier Fernández (right) at the 2018 Winter Olympics podium
- The list considers records and results by other skaters until the end of Hanyu's competitive career on July 19, 2022.

Chronological list of firsts and records in competitive skating
Date	Achievement	Event	Ref.
Nov 24, 2008	Youngest male single skater to win the Japan Junior Championships (13 years and 353 days)	2008–09 Japan Junior Championships	
Mar 11, 2010	Youngest Japanese male single skater to win the World Junior Championships (15 years and 94 days)	2010 World Junior Championships	
Feb 19, 2011	Youngest male single skater to win a medal at the Four Continents Championships (16 years and 74 days)	2011 Four Continents Championships	
Mar 31, 2012	Youngest Japanese male single skater to win a medal at the World Championships (17 years and 115 days)	2012 World Championships	
Feb 13, 2014	First skater to surpass 100 points in the short program	2014 Winter Olympics	
Feb 14, 2014	First Asian male single skater to win the Olympics and the youngest since Dick Button in 1948 (19 years and 69 days)	2014 Winter Olympics	
Mar 28, 2014	First Asian and only skater besides Alexei Yagudin, Aljona Savchenko, and Bruno Massot to win the Olympics, Worlds, and the Grand Prix Final in the same season	2014 World Championships	
Nov 8, 2014	First skater to successfully land a triple Axel-Euler-triple Salchow jump combination (in the ISU Judging System)	2014 Cup of China	
Dec 13, 2014	First and only skater across all disciplines to win the Winter Olympics and the Grand Prix Final in the same calendar year	2014–15 Grand Prix Final	
Nov 28, 2015	First skater to surpass 200 points in the free skating and 300 in the combined total	2015 NHK Trophy	
Dec 12, 2015	New record for the largest victory margin at a major international senior event across all disciplines (37.48 points)	2015–16 Grand Prix Final	
Sep 30, 2016	First skater to successfully land a quadruple loop jump in international competition	2016 CS Autumn Classic	
Dec 10, 2016	First single skater and only skater besides Meryl Davis and Charlie White to win the Grand Prix Final four consecutive times	2016–17 Grand Prix Final	
Apr 1, 2017	First Asian male single skater to win multiple world championship titles	2017 World Championships	
Apr 21, 2017	First skater to successfully land three quadruple jumps in the second half of a free skate program	2017 World Team Trophy	
Oct 21, 2017	First skater to debut four types of quadruple jumps successfully at first attempt with a positive grade of execution (GOE) in international competition (toe loop in 2010, Salchow in 2012, loop in 2016, and Lutz in 2017)	2017 Rostelecom Cup	
Feb 17, 2018	First male single skater in 66 years since Dick Button in 1952 to win the Olympics twice (consecutively)	2018 Winter Olympics	
Mar 24, 2018	First single skater to be ranked first in the world standings for five consecutive seasons	–	
Nov 4, 2018	First and only skater to successfully land a quadruple toe loop-triple Axel jump sequence in international competition	2018 Grand Prix of Helsinki	
Oct 26, 2019	First skater to successfully land a quadruple toe loop-Euler-triple flip combination in international competition	2019 Skate Canada	
Oct 26, 2019	New record for the largest victory margin in the Grand Prix Series (59.82 points)	2019 Skate Canada	
Feb 7, 2020	New record for the most scored world records in single skating since the introduction of the ISU Judging System in 2003 (19 world records)	2020 Four Continents Championships	
Feb 9, 2020	First and only male single skater to achieve a Super Slam, winning all available major international senior and junior titles	2020 Four Continents Championships	
Mar 25, 2021	New record of 50 landed triple Axel jumps with positive GOE in 51 international senior short programs (98% success rate) (Note: The Axel jump is a required element in the senior men's short program. Only one attempt of a triple Axel is permitted in that competition segment.)	2021 World Championships	
Mar 27, 2021	Second male single skater after Jan Hoffmann to win seven world championship medals in the post-war era (after 1946)	2021 World Championships	
Dec 26, 2021	First male single skater in the IJS era to win the Japan Championships six times and third after Nobuo Sato (ten titles between 1956 and 1965) and Takeshi Honda (six titles between 1995 and 2004)	2021–22 Japan Championships	
Feb 10, 2022	First skater to attempt a quadruple Axel jump at the Olympics, which was the closest attempt in international competition up to then	2022 Winter Olympics	

=== Professional skating ===
- As of April 2026, no other skater has produced or presented a solo ice show.

Chronological list of firsts and records in professional skating
Date	Achievement	Event	Ref.
Nov 4, 2022	First figure skater to produce and present a solo ice show, with no other skaters in the line-up	Prologue	
Feb 26, 2023	First ice skater to perform at Tokyo Dome (first time for an ice rink to be set up at the venue)	Gift	
Feb 26, 2023	New record for the largest ice show audience (35,000 spectators, sold-out event)	Gift	
Nov 4, 2023	First figure skater to produce and present a solo ice show tour	Repray Tour	
Apr 9, 2024	New record for the total attendance of a solo ice show tour (64,000 spectators, sold-out tour)	Repray Tour	
Dec 7, 2024	New records for the longest solo ice show (140 min, intermission not included) and most performed programs by an individual skater in one ice show (15 programs)	Echoes of Life Tour	
Apr 12, 2026	New records for most solo ice show productions (five productions) and most solo ice shows presented by one skater (23 shows)	Yuzuru Hanyu Ice Story	
Apr 12, 2026	First solo ice show series to exceed 200,000 spectators in total (sold-out series, cinema live viewing and live streaming numbers not included)	Yuzuru Hanyu Ice Story	

== Awards and honors ==
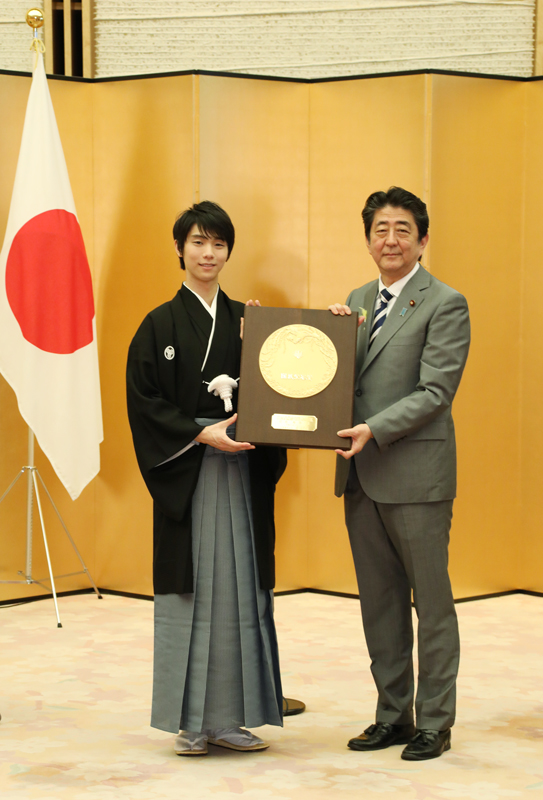
Hanyu presented with the People's Honor Award by then Japanese prime minister Shinzo Abe (right)

People's Honor Award

- Awarded in 2018

Japan Medals of Honor

- Purple Ribbon (2014, 2018)

Kikuchi Kan Prize

- Awarded in 2022

Laureus World Sports Awards

- Comeback of the Year – nominated in 2019

ISU Skating Awards

- "Most Valuable Skater" (2020)

Japanese Olympic Committee

- JOC Sports Award – Newcomer Award (2009), Best Award (2013), Special Achievement Award (2015), Special Honor Award (2018)
- Olympic Special Award (2014, 2018)

Japan Skating Federation

- JOC Cup (Most Valuable Player Award) (2014, 2015, 2016, 2017, 2018, 2020)
- Special Achievement Award (2023)

Kozuki Sports Awards

- Awarded in 2010, 2012, 2013, 2014 (grand prize), and 2018

Waseda University

- Azusa Ono Memorial Award (2021)
- Alumni Association Toukon Award (2021)

Public Relations Society of Japan (PRSJ)

- "Person of the Year" (2022)

Media

- Asahi Shimbun: Asahi Sports Award (2014)
- Business Insider: "Most Dominant Athletes Alive" (#33 in 2014, #21 in 2015)
- Chunichi Shimbun: 29th "Chunichi Sports Award" (2015)
- ESPN World Fame 100 (#70 in 2018, #64 in 2019), "The Dominant 20" #11 (2018), "Top 25 Olympians of the 21st century" #10 (2024)
- Forbes: 30 Under 30 Asia (2018)
- Japan Newspaper Publishers and Editors Association: "Happy News Person Award" (2018)
- Kahoku Shinpo: 64th "Hebei Cultural Award" (2014)
- Mainichi Shimbun: 22nd "Daily Sports People Award" Grand Prix (2014)
- Marca: "The 100 Best Male Sportsmen of the 21st Century" #62 (2020)
- Notícias ao Minuto: "The athletes with the most awards and medals of all time" (Top 30 selection)
- Oricon News: "Top 10 Favorite Athletes" Male category (#3 in 2014 and 2016, #1 in 2017, #2 in 2018, 2019, 2020, and 2021)
- Sports Graphic Number: 33rd "MVP Award" (2014)
- Tohoku Sports Press Club: Sports Award (2011, 2014, 2015, 2016, 2018)
- Tokyo Sports Press Club: Special Award (2012), Skater of the Year (2014, 2015, 2018)
- TV Asahi: "Big Sports Awards" (2014, 2015, 2016, 2017, 2018), "Special Sports Broadcasting Award" (2019)
- Xinhua News Agency: "Top 10 Worlds Athletes/Sports Personalities" (#7 in 2018, #5 in 2020)
- Yahoo! Japan: "Yahoo! Search Awards" Grand Prize & Athlete Category (2014), Special Category & Athlete Category (2018), Grand Prize & Athlete Category (2022)
- Yomiuri Shimbun: "Japan Sports Awards" Grand Prix (2014, 2018)

Municipality

- Miyagi "Citizens' Honor Award" (2014, 2018)
- Miyagi "Chairman of Prefectural Assembly's Special Award" (2014, 2018)
- Sendai "Chairman of City Assembly's Special Award" (2018)
- Sendai "Plaque of tribute" (2014, 2018)
- Sendai "Sports Awards" (2010, 2011, 2012, 2013)
- Sendai "Monument of Figure Skating" (2017, 2019)
- Tokyo "Honor Award" (2018)
- Tokyo "Sports Grand Prize" (2018)

== Medals and major titles ==
=== Super Slam ===
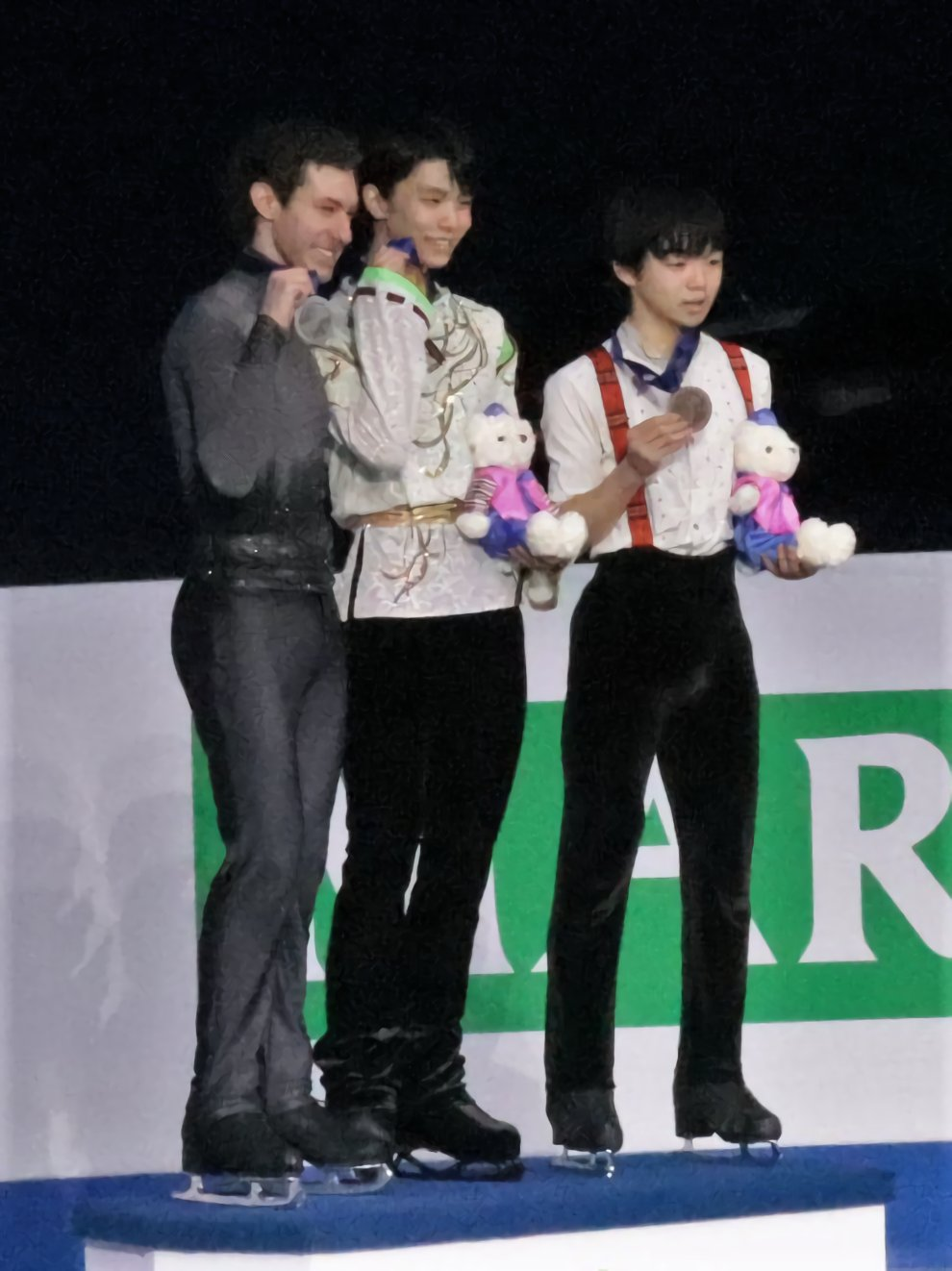
Hanyu (center) at the 2020 Four Continents podium, completing the Super Slam

The Career Super Grand Slam or Super Slam is an achievement of winning all major international figure skating events in a discipline at junior and senior level, namely the Winter Olympics, the senior and junior World Championships, the Four Continents or European Championships as well as the senior and junior Grand Prix Final at any point in the course of a career. With his win at the 2020 Four Continents Championships, Hanyu became the first skater in men's singles to complete the Super Slam.

Chronological list of first major intl. senior and junior titles
No.	Date	Event	Edition
1	Dec 4, 2009	Junior Grand Prix Final	(Japan) 2009–10
2	Mar 11, 2010	World Junior Championships	(Netherlands) 2010
3	Dec 6, 2013	Grand Prix Final	(Japan) 2013–14
4	Feb 14, 2014	Winter Olympics	(Russia) 2014
5	Mar 28, 2014	World Championships	(Japan) 2014
6	Feb 9, 2020	Four Continents Championships	(South Korea) 2020

=== Medal record by event ===
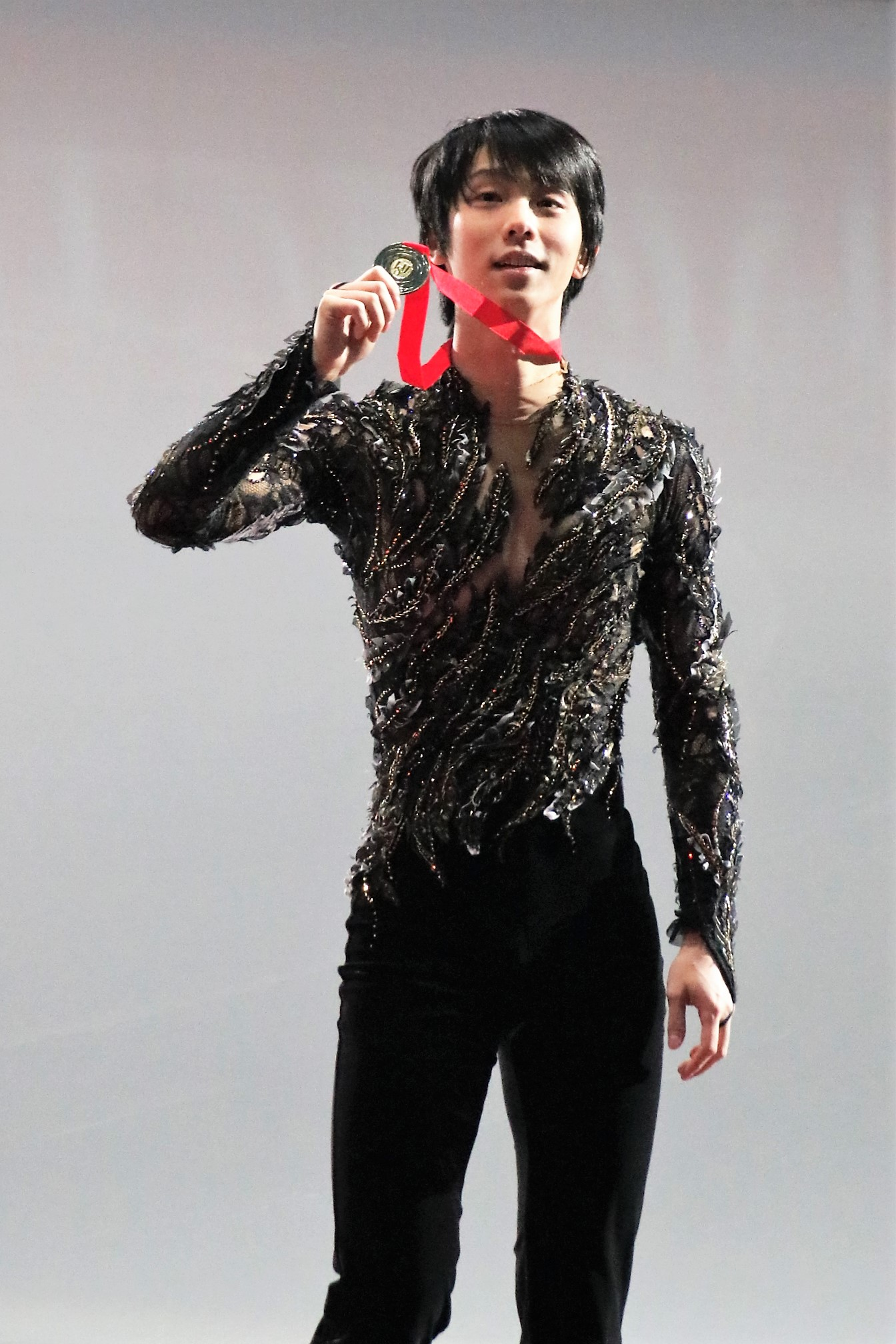
Hanyu at the victory ceremony of the 2018 Rostelecom Cup

In the course of his junior and senior career from 2008 to 2022, Hanyu has medalled 59 times in 72 events, winning 37 golds. In 25 Super Slam events, he won 11 golds and finished on the podium 21 times overall. He also medalled at seven different senior Grand Prix events (the Final not included), (Note: During Hanyu's senior career between 2010 and 2022, the ISU Grand Prix Series only consisted of six recurring international Grand Prix events in Canada, China, France, Japan, Russia, and the United States. In 2018, the Cup of China was replaced by the 2018 Grand Prix of Helsinki, which Hanyu won.) and won gold at four of them.

- The list includes medals and participations in senior and junior events.
- Medals at team events are included only by team result, not individual result.
- Events at novice level, withdrawals, and cancelled events are not included in the list.

Medal record at major international senior and junior events
Event	Part.	Gold	Silver	Bronze	Total
Winter Olympics	3	2	0	0	2
World Championships	8	2	3	2	7
Four Continents Championships	4	1	3	0	4
Grand Prix Final	7	4	2	0	6
World Junior Championships	2	1	0	0	1
Junior Grand Prix Final	1	1	0	0	1
Total	25	11	8	2	21

Medal record at national senior and junior events
Event	Part.	Gold	Silver	Bronze	Total
Japan Championships	11	6	1	1	8
Japan Junior Championships	4	2	0	1	3
Total	15	8	1	2	11

Medal record in the Grand Prix Series
Event	Part.	Gold	Silver	Bronze	Total
GP Cup of China	2	0	1	0	1
GP Finland	1	1	0	0	1
GP France	1	0	1	0	1
GP NHK Trophy	6	4	0	0	4
GP Rostelecom Cup	4	2	1	0	3
GP Skate America	1	0	1	0	1
GP Skate Canada	4	1	3	0	4
Total	19	8	7	0	15

Medal record in the Junior Grand Prix Series
Event	Part.	Gold	Silver	Bronze	Total
JGP Croatia	1	1	0	0	1
JGP Italy	1	0	0	0	0
JGP Poland	1	1	0	0	1
Total	3	2	0	0	2

Medal record in the Challenger Series and other international events
Event	Part.	Gold	Silver	Bronze	Total
Autumn Classic International	5	4	1	0	5
Finlandia Trophy	2	2	0	0	2
Nebelhorn Trophy	1	1	0	0	1
Total	8	7	1	0	8

Medal record at team events
Event	Part.	Gold	Silver	Bronze	Total
Winter Olympics – Team event	1	0	0	0	0
World Team Trophy	3	1	0	2	3
Total	4	1	0	2	3

=== Medal record by season ===
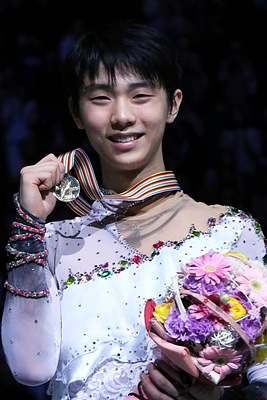
Hanyu at the 2014 World Championships podium, winning his first world title

Hanyu medalled in all 14 figure skating seasons of his junior and senior career and won at least one gold in each season with exception of his senior debut in 2010–11. His most successful season by medals was the 2013–14 season, having won his first Winter Olympics, World Championships, Grand Prix Final, and seven medals in total. He also medalled seven times in the 2016–17 season, including his second World and fourth Grand Prix Final title.

- The list includes medals and participations at international events and national championships.
- Medals at team events are included only by team result, not individual result.
- Withdrawals and cancelled events are not included in the list.

Medal record in senior seasons
Season	Events	Gold	Silver	Bronze	Total
2010–11	4	0	1	0	1
2011–12	6	2	0	2	4
2012–13	7	3	3	0	6
2013–14	8	5	2	0	7
2014–15	6	2	2	1	5
2015–16	6	4	2	0	6
2016–17	7	5	2	0	7
2017–18	3	1	2	0	3
2018–19	4	3	1	0	4
2019–20	6	4	2	0	6
2020–21	3	1	0	2	3
2021–22	2	1	0	0	1
Total	62	31	17	5	53

Medal record in junior seasons
Season	Events	Gold	Silver	Bronze	Total
2008–09	4	1	0	0	1
2009–10	6	5	0	0	5
Total	10	6	0	0	6

== International record scores ==
=== International record scores by segment ===
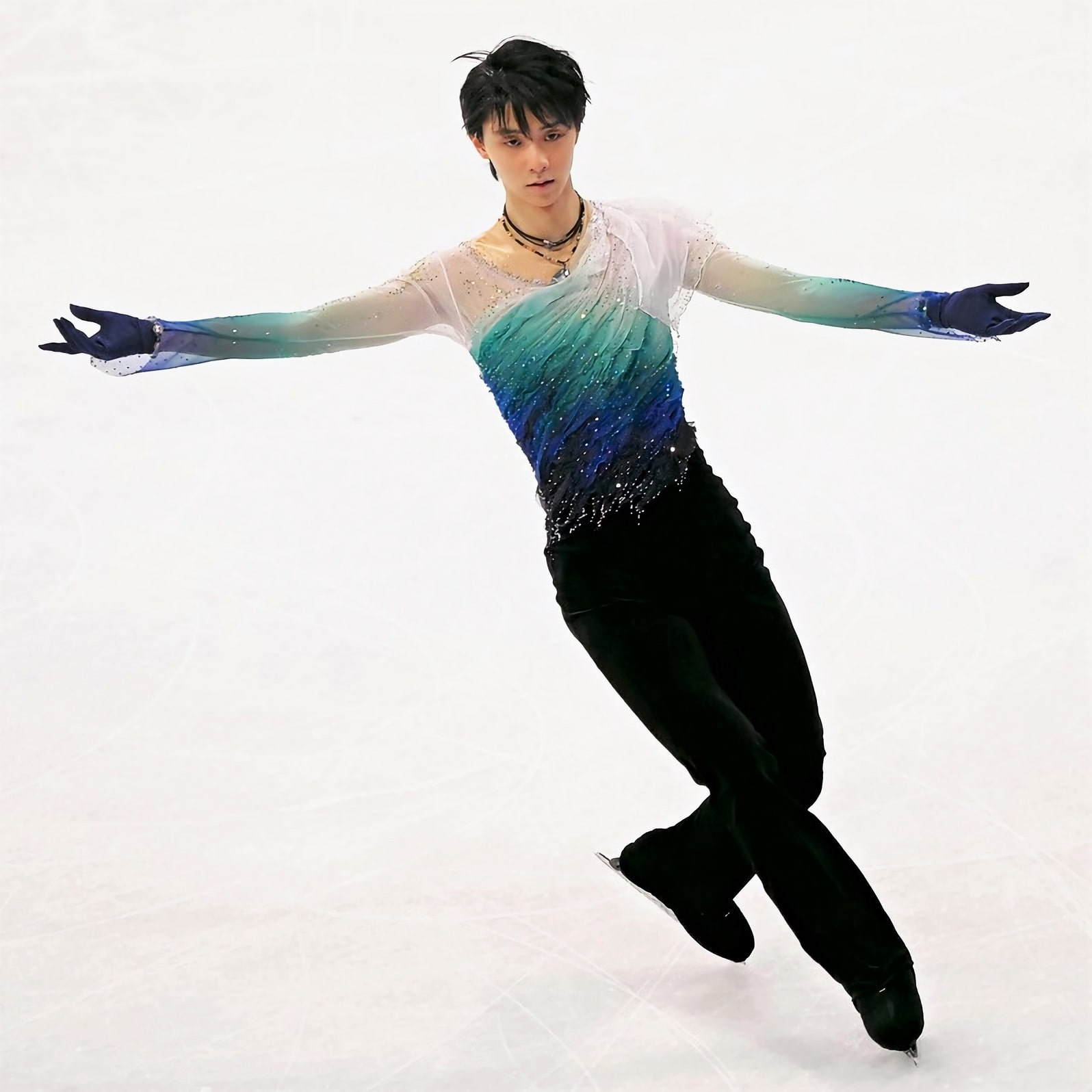
Hanyu in his free skate program Hope and Legacy at Worlds 2017 that earned him a historical record

By the end of his competitive career on July 19, 2022, Hanyu was the record holder for the program component score (PCS) in the men's short program and set all historical records in the +3/-3 GOE System except the technical element score (TES) in the free skating, which was scored by Nathan Chen in 2018. Hanyu achieved three of the seven historical records at the 2015–16 Grand Prix Final, namely the combined total score and the program component scores in both competition segments.

- TSS – Total segment score
- TES – Technical element score
- PCS – Program component score
- Historical record scores achieved in the +3/-3 GOE System highlighted in **bold and italic**
- Highest total segment scores (TSS) are recognized as world records by Guinness World Records.
- The list considers records and results by other skaters until the end of Hanyu's competitive career on July 19, 2022.

Highest scores by competition segment
Segment	Type	Score	Event	Date
Short program	PCS	48.47	2019 Skate Canada	Oct 25, 2019

Highest historical scores by competition segment
Segment	Type	Score	Event	Date
Combined total	–	**330.43**	2015–16 Grand Prix Final	Dec 12, 2015
Short program	TSS	**112.72**	2017 CS Autumn Classic	Sep 22, 2017
Short program	TES	64.17	2017 CS Autumn Classic	Sep 22, 2017
Short program	PCS	49.14	2015–16 Grand Prix Final	Dec 10, 2015
Free skating	TSS	**223.20**	2017 World Championships	Apr 1, 2017
Free skating	PCS	98.56	2015–16 Grand Prix Final	Dec 12, 2015

=== International record scores by event ===
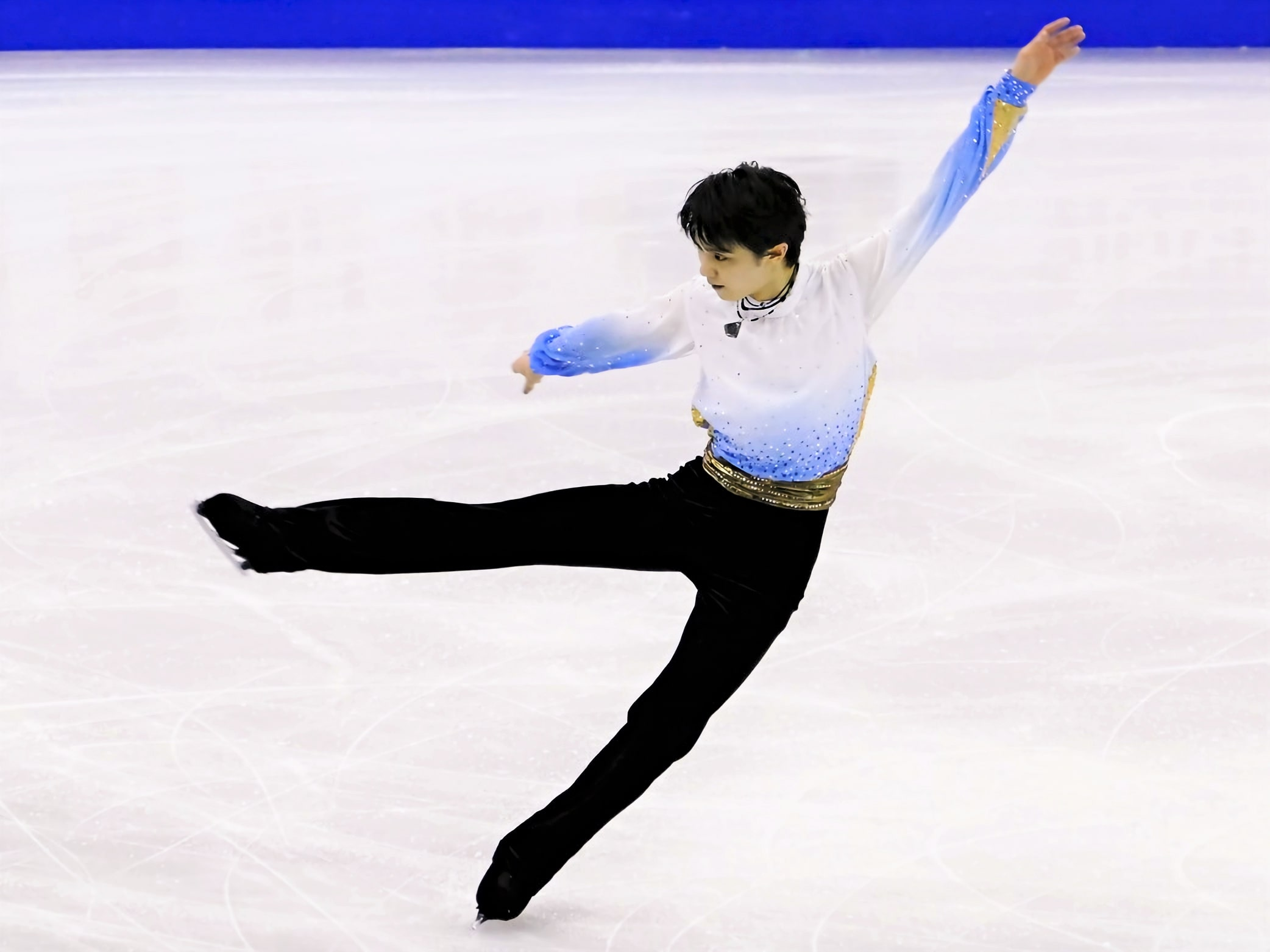
Hanyu in his short program Ballade No. 1 at the 2015–16 Grand Prix Final

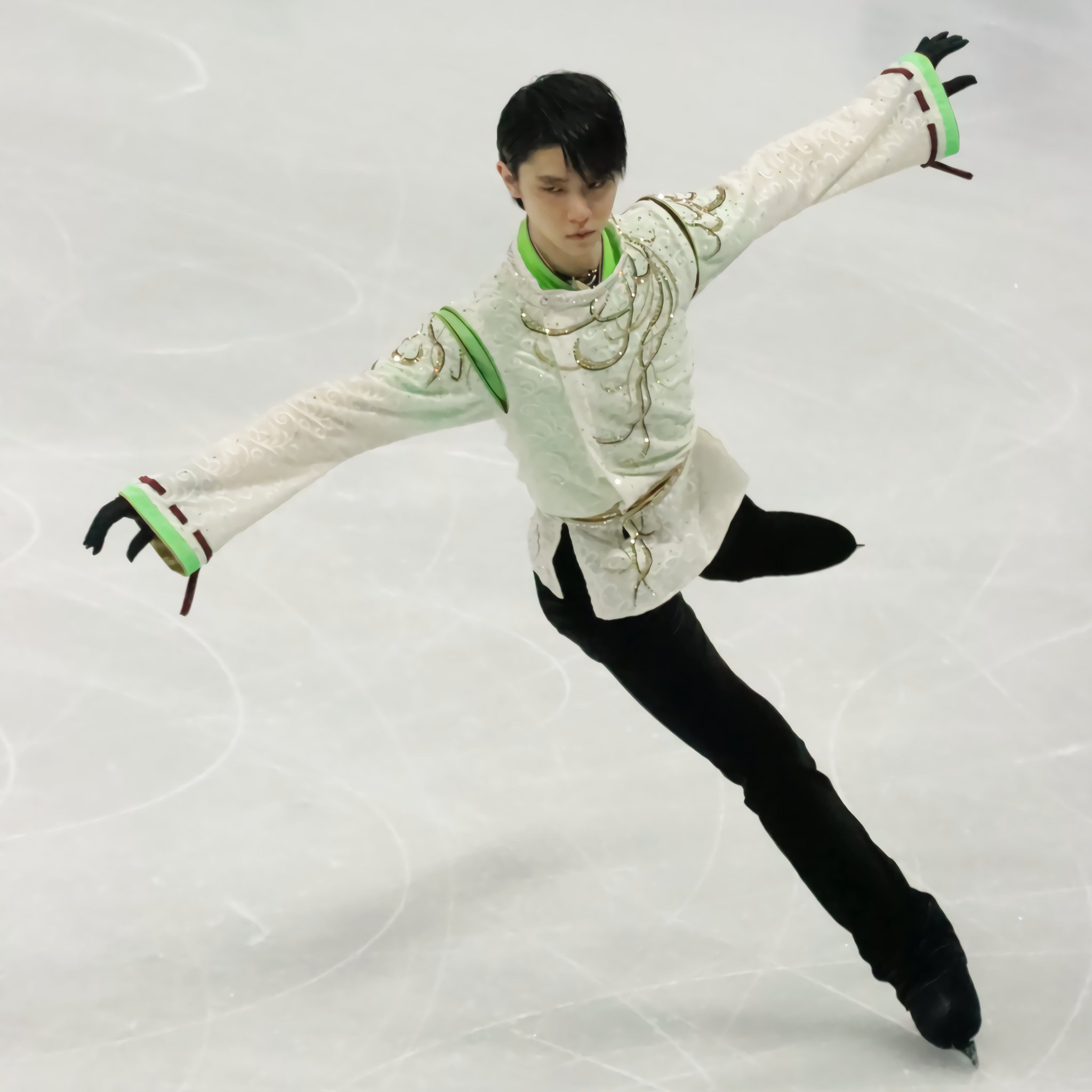
Hanyu in his free skate program Seimei at the 2020 Four Continents Championships

Only records at main international senior events are listed, namely the Winter Olympics (individual event), World Championships, Four Continents, and the Grand Prix Final. (Note: The European Championships are excluded, since Hanyu is not eligible for that event.) By the end of his competitive career, Hanyu held the event record score for the men's short program and combined total at the Four Continents Championships. He also set nine of the twelve historical records at main international events, among them the records in all three competition segments at the World Championships and the Grand Prix Final. Hanyu's Olympic programs Ballade No. 1 and Seimei contributed to eight of the eleven event records in men's singles.

- SP – Short program, FS – Free skating
- Historical record scores achieved in the +3/-3 GOE System highlighted in **bold and italic**
- The list considers records and results by other skaters until the end of Hanyu's competitive career on July 19, 2022.

Highest scores in the different competition segments by event
Event	Segment	Score	Edition	Date
Four Continents	Total	299.42	2020	Feb 9, 2020
Four Continents	SP	111.82	2020	Feb 7, 2020

Highest historical scores in the different competition segments by event
Event	Segment	Score	Edition	Date
Winter Olympics	Total	317.85	2018	Feb 17, 2018
Winter Olympics	SP	111.68	2018	Feb 16, 2018
World Championships	Total	321.59	2017	Apr 1, 2017
World Championships	SP	110.56	2016	Mar 30, 2016
World Championships	FS	**223.20**	2017	Apr 1, 2017
Four Continents	FS	206.64	2017	Feb 19, 2017
Grand Prix Final	Total	**330.43**	2015–16	Dec 12, 2015
Grand Prix Final	SP	110.95	2015–16	Dec 10, 2015
Grand Prix Final	FS	219.48	2015–16	Dec 12, 2015

=== International maximum scores ===
==== Technical elements ====
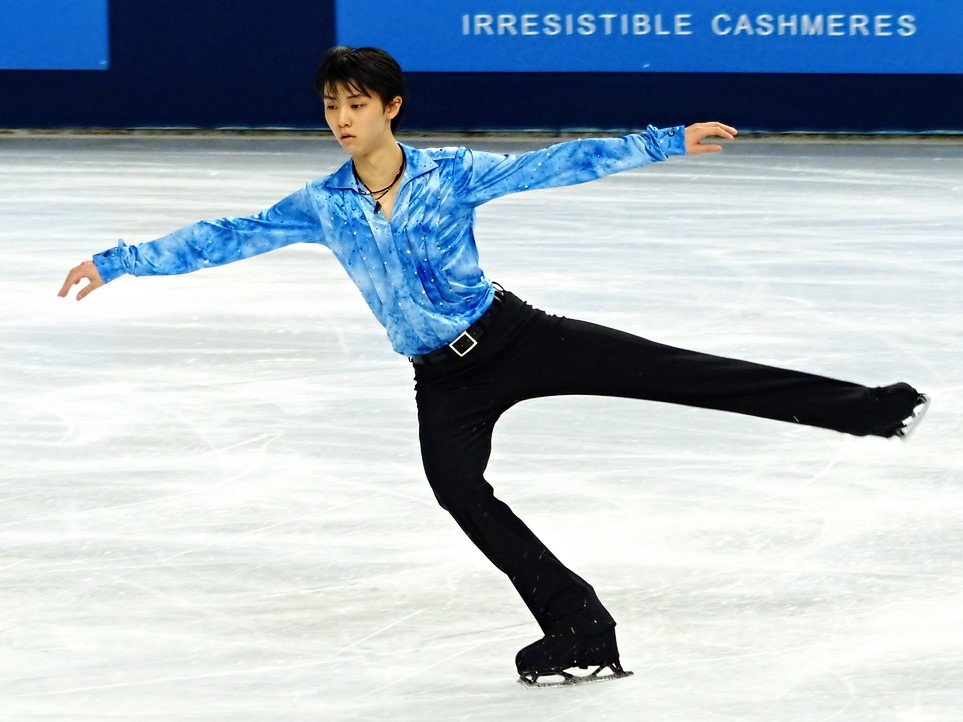
Hanyu landing a triple Axel in his short program "Parisienne Walkways" at the 2013 Trophée Éric Bompard

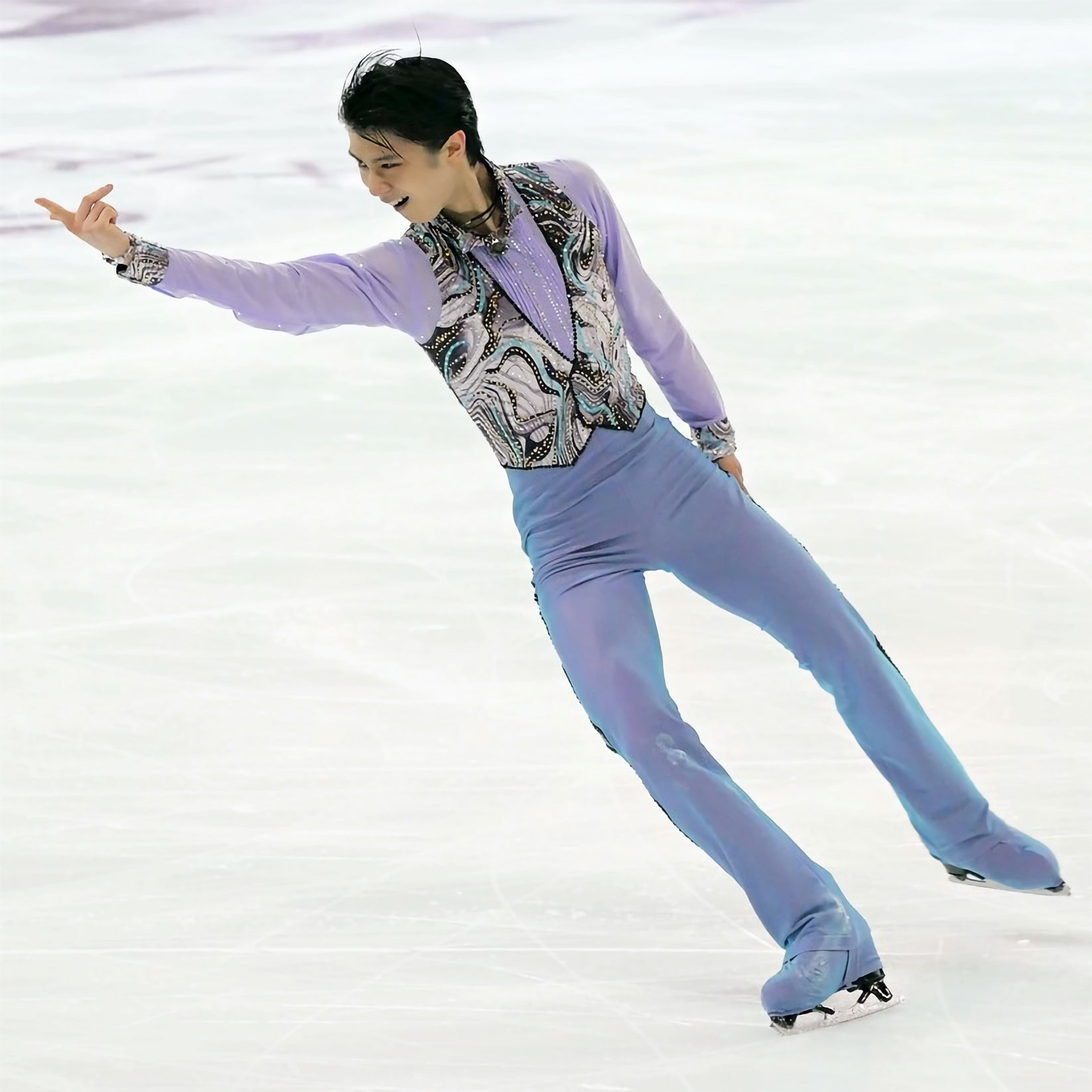
Hanyu in the step sequence of his short program "Let's Go Crazy" at the 2016–17 Grand Prix Final

In figure skating, a technical element is awarded a perfect score if it is credited with the full base value by the technical panel and the maximum grade of execution after dropping the highest and lowest mark across the judging panel (+3 marks before and +5 marks since the 2018–19 season). In the +5/-5 GOE System, Hanyu received one perfect score for a technical element in international competition, namely his triple Axel jump in the short program at the 2019 Skate Canada International. Before the system change, he was awarded a total of 28 maximum scores, covering all types of required technical elements in the senior men's singles discipline: three types of solo jumps, two different jump combinations, a spin, the step sequence, and the choreographic sequence.

Seven of the 29 technical elements received unanimous +3 marks from all judges on the panel: four triple Axels, a quadruple Salchow, a choreographic sequence, and his step sequence in the short program at the 2016 World Championships. However, that element did not earn a maximum score because it was not credited with the full base value. Hanyu's solo triple Axel jump received a perfect score ten times, the most among all elements. The Axels were all executed in the short program, six of them in the second half.

- SP – Short program, FS – Free skating
- x – 10% bonus for the base value of a jump executed in the second half of the program
- Unanimous +3 marks from the judging panel highlighted in **bold**

Technical elements with a maximum score in the +5/-5 GOE System
No.	Element	Score	+5s	Seg.	Event
1	3A	12.00	8/9	SP	2019 Skate Canada

Technical elements with a maximum score in the +3/-3 GOE System
No.	Element	Score	+3s	Seg.	Event
1	3A	11.50	8/9	SP	2014 Cup of China
2	3A	11.50	6/7	SP	2015 Autumn Classic
3	3A	11.50	8/9	SP	2015 Skate Canada
4	3A+2T	13.78 x	8/9	FS	2015 NHK Trophy
5	ChSq1	4.10	8/9	FS	2015 NHK Trophy
6	4S	13.50	8/9	SP	2015–16 Grand Prix Final
7	4T+3T	17.60	8/9	SP	2015–16 Grand Prix Final
8	4S	13.50	8/9	FS	2015–16 Grand Prix Final
9	4T	13.30	8/9	FS	2015–16 Grand Prix Final
10	3A+2T	13.78 x	8/9	FS	2015–16 Grand Prix Final
11	ChSq1	4.10	**9/9**	FS	2015–16 Grand Prix Final
12	4S	13.50	8/9	SP	2016 World Championships
13	3A	12.35 x	**9/9**	SP	2016 World Championships
14	StSq4	6.00	6/7	SP	2016 CS Autumn Classic
15	3A	12.35 x	8/9	SP	2016 NHK Trophy
16	StSq4	6.00	8/9	SP	2016–17 Grand Prix Final
17	3A	12.35 x	8/9	SP	2017 Four Continents
18	StSq4	6.00	8/9	SP	2017 World Championships
19	StSq4	6.00	8/9	SP	2017 World Team Trophy
20	4S	13.50	**7/7**	SP	2017 CS Autumn Classic
21	CSSp4	4.50	6/7	SP	2017 CS Autumn Classic
22	3A	12.35 x	**7/7**	SP	2017 CS Autumn Classic
23	3A	12.35 x	**9/9**	SP	2017 Rostelecom Cup
24	ChSq1	4.10	8/9	FS	2017 Rostelecom Cup
25	3A	12.35 x	**9/9**	SP	2018 Winter Olympics
26	StSq4	6.00	8/9	SP	2018 Winter Olympics
27	4S	13.50	8/9	FS	2018 Winter Olympics
28	4T	13.30	8/9	FS	2018 Winter Olympics

Hanyu's most successful season by maximum scores was the 2015–16 season. He was awarded a perfect score for twelve technical elements and maximum grades of execution for another three step sequences that were not credited with the full base value due to level downgrades. Before the 2014–15 season, Hanyu did not receive any maximum scores for single technical elements in international competition.

Number of awarded maximum scores for technical elements by season
Element	14–15	15–16	16–17	17–18	18–19	19–20	20–21	21–22	Total
3A	1	3	2	3		1			10
4S		3		2					5
StSq4			4	1					5
ChSq1		2		1					3
3A+2T		2							2
4T		1		1					2
4T+3T		1							1
CSSp4				1					1
Total	**1**	**12**	**6**	**9**	**0**	**1**	**0**	**0**	29

==== Program components ====
A program component is awarded a maximum score if it receives marks of 10.00 from all judges after dropping the highest and lowest mark across the panel. The five components until the 2022–23 season were skating skills (SS), transitions (TR), performance (PE), composition (CO), and interpretation (IN). At the 2015–16 Grand Prix Final, Hanyu was awarded a perfect 10.00 in his short program for the performance component.

Program components with a maximum score
No.	Component	Score	10s	Seg.	Event
1	Performance	10.00	8/9	SP	2015–16 Grand Prix Final

== National record scores ==
=== National record scores by segment ===
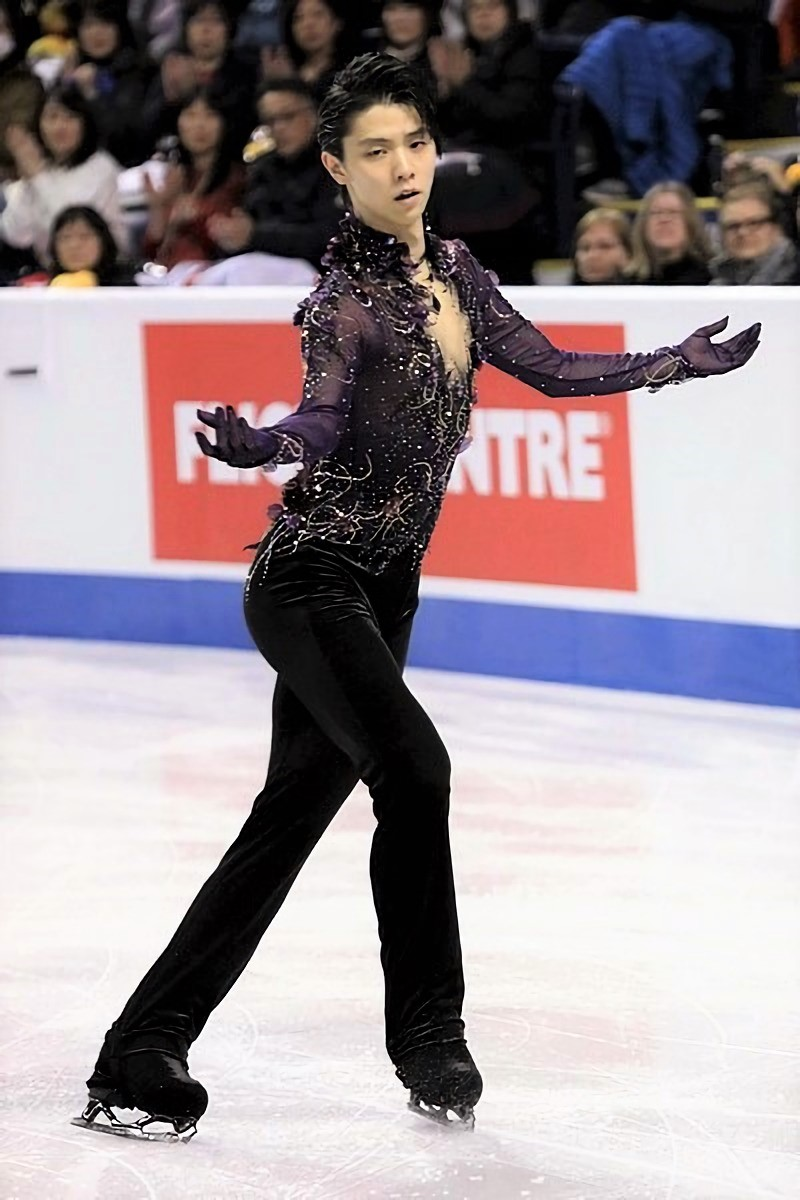
Hanyu performing his free skate program Origin at 2019 Skate Canada International

A Japanese national record score is the highest score achieved by a Japanese skater in a competition segment at an international event sanctioned by the International Skating Union (ISU). Highest scores achieved at domestic skating events like the Japan Championships do not count for national records, but they are recorded by the Japan Skating Federation and reported various news outlets.

By the end of his competitive career, Hanyu held the current and historical Japanese national record scores in all three segments of the senior men's singles discipline. Two of them were achieved at the 2019 Skate Canada International, namely the national records for the free skating and combined total score in the +5/-5 GOE System. By the end of his career, Hanyu also held all six event records at the Japan Championships, of which five were scored at Saitama Super Arena in Saitama.

- SP – Short program, FS – Free skating
- Historical record scores highlighted in **bold and italic**
- The list considers records and results by other skaters until the end of Hanyu's competitive career on July 19, 2022.

Japanese national record scores by competition segment
System	Segment	Score	Event	Date
Current	Total	322.59	2019 Skate Canada	Oct 26, 2019
Current	SP	111.82	2020 Four Continents	Feb 7, 2020
Current	FS	212.99	2019 Skate Canada	Oct 26, 2019
Historical	Total	**330.43**	2015–16 Grand Prix Final	Dec 12, 2015
Historical	SP	**112.72**	2017 CS Autumn Classic	Sep 22, 2017
Historical	FS	**223.20**	2017 World Championships	Apr 1, 2017

Highest scores at the Japan Championships by competition segment
System	Segment	Score	Edition	Place	Date
Current	Total	322.36	2021–22	Saitama	Dec 26, 2021
Current	SP	111.31	2021–22	Saitama	Dec 26, 2021
Current	FS	215.83	2020–21	Nagano	Dec 27, 2020
Historical	Total	297.80	2013–14	Saitama	Dec 23, 2013
Historical	SP	103.10	2013–14	Saitama	Dec 23, 2013
Historical	FS	194.70	2013–14	Saitama	Dec 23, 2013

=== National maximum scores ===
Hanyu received a total of 11 maximum scores for technical elements at the Japan Championships. In the +5/-5 GOE System, he earned perfect scores for a spin, two step sequences, and a choreographic sequence. In addition, he received a perfect score of 10.00 in the interpretation component for his short program at the 2021–22 Japan Championships. In the +3/-3 GOE System, he was rewarded seven maximum scores for six solo jumps and a jump combination.

- x – 10% bonus for the base value of a jump executed in the second half of the program
- Unanimous +5 or +3 marks from the judging panel highlighted in **bold**

Technical elements with a maximum score at the Japan Championships in the +5/-5 GOE System
No.	Element	Score	+5s	Seg.	Edition	Place
1	StSq4	5.85	**9/9**	SP	2021–22	Saitama
2	CCoSp4	5.25	8/9	SP	2021–22	Saitama
3	StSq4	5.85	8/9	FS	2021–22	Saitama
4	ChSq1	5.50	**9/9**	FS	2021–22	Saitama

Technical elements with a maximum score at the Japan Championships in the +3/-3 GOE System
No.	Element	Score	+3s	Seg.	Edition	Place
1	3A	12.35 x	**7/7**	SP	2013–14	Saitama
2	4T	13.30	6/7	SP	2014–15	Nagano
3	3A	12.35 x	6/7	SP	2014–15	Nagano
4	4T+3T	17.60	**9/9**	SP	2015–16	Sapporo
5	4S	13.50	8/9	FS	2015–16	Sapporo
6	4T	13.30	8/9	FS	2015–16	Sapporo
7	3F	7.40	**9/9**	FS	2015–16	Sapporo

Program components with a maximum score at the Japan Championships
No.	Component	Score	10s	Seg.	Edition	Place
1	Interpretation	10.00	8/9	SP	2021–22	Saitama

== Absolute best scores ==
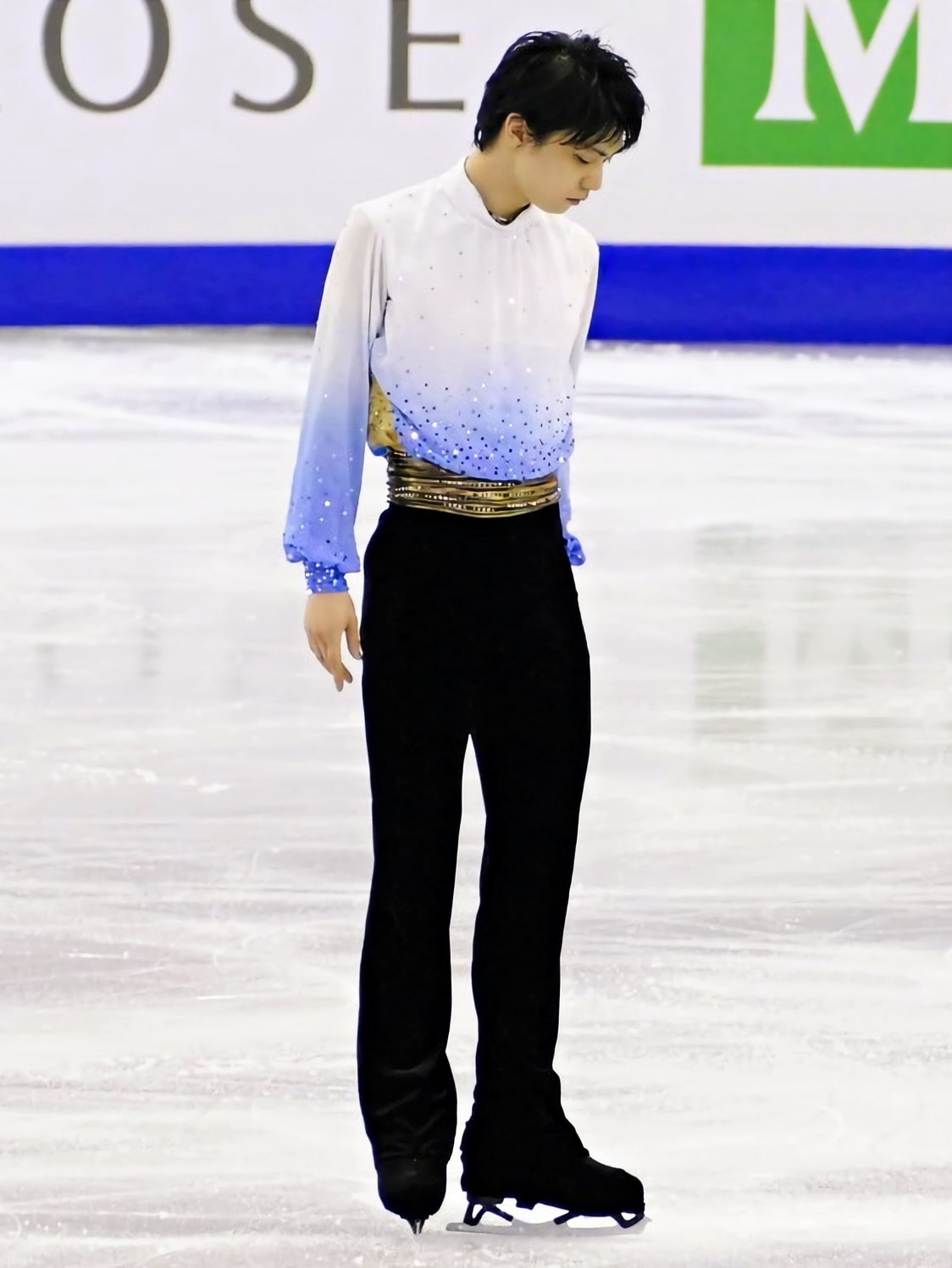
Hanyu in his short program Ballade No. 1 at the 2015–16 Grand Prix Final

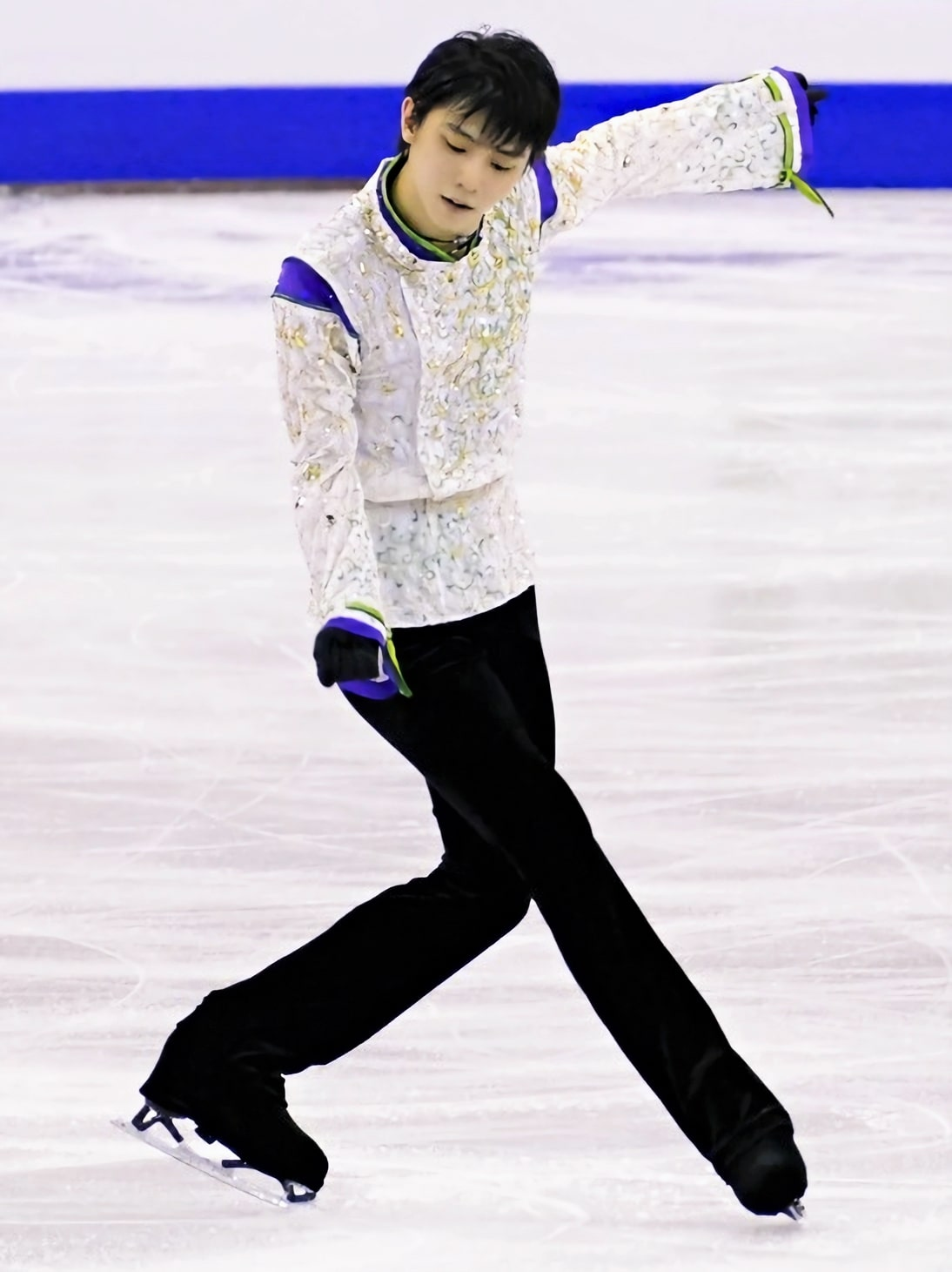
Hanyu performing his free skate program Seimei at the 2015–16 Grand Prix Final

Absolute best scores are officially recorded by the International Skating Union and, compared to personal bests, they consider multiple scores by one skater in each competition segment. In the men's singles discipline, the crucial scores to surpass are 100 points in the short program, 200 in the free skating, and 300 in the combined total score. Hanyu was the first skater to surpass all three in international competition. By the end of his competitive career in 2022, only five other skaters have scored above 300 points in total, namely Javier Fernández, Nathan Chen, Jin Boyang, Shoma Uno, and Yuma Kagiyama.

Hanyu scored ten times above 300 points in the combined total and was the first skater to surpass 310, 320, and 330 points in international competition. In the short program, he scored fifteen times above 100 points and was the first to surpass 110 points, being the only one to do so in the +3/-3 GOE System. His short program Ballade No. 1 was awarded more than 110 points five times, the most times among all short programs. In the free skating, Hanyu scored eight times above 200 points and was the first to surpass 210 and 220 points. His free skate program Seimei was the first to be awarded more than 200 points, surpassing that score trice.

Combined total scores above 300 points in the +5/-5 GOE System
No.	Score	Event
1	322.59	2019 Skate Canada
2	305.05	2019 NHK Trophy
3	300.97	2019 World Championships
4	300.88	2021 World Team Trophy

Combined total scores above 300 points in the +3/-3 GOE System
No.	Score	Event
1	330.43	2015–16 Grand Prix Final
2	322.40	2015 NHK Trophy
3	321.59	2017 World Championships
4	317.85	2018 Winter Olympics
5	303.71	2017 Four Continents
6	301.47	2016 NHK Trophy

Short program scores above 100 points in the +5/-5 GOE System
No.	Score	Event
1	111.82	2020 Four Continents
2	110.53	2018 Rostelecom Cup
3	109.60	2019 Skate Canada
4	109.34	2019 NHK Trophy
5	107.12	2021 World Team Trophy
6	106.98	2021 World Championships
7	106.69	2018 Grand Prix of Helsinki

Short program scores above 100 points in the +3/-3 GOE System
No.	Score	Event
1	112.72	2017 CS Autumn Classic
2	111.68	2018 Winter Olympics
3	110.95	2015–16 Grand Prix Final
4	110.56	2016 World Championships
5	106.53	2016–17 Grand Prix Final
6	106.33	2015 NHK Trophy
7	103.89	2016 NHK Trophy
8	101.45	2014 Winter Olympics

Free skating scores above 200 points in the +5/-5 GOE System
No.	Score	Event
1	212.99	2019 Skate Canada
2	206.10	2019 World Championships

Free skating scores above 200 points in the +3/-3 GOE System
No.	Score	Event
1	223.20	2017 World Championships
2	219.48	2015–16 Grand Prix Final
3	216.07	2015 NHK Trophy
4	206.67	2017 Four Continents
5	206.17	2018 Winter Olympics
6	200.49	2017 World Team Trophy

== Detailed results ==
- TSS – Total segment score highlighted in **bold**
- TES – Technical element score
- PCS – Program component score
- Historical record scores highlighted in **bold and italic**

ISU personal best scores in the +5/-5 GOE System
Segment	Type	Score	Event
Total	**TSS**	**322.59**	2019 Skate Canada
Short program	**TSS**	**111.82**	2020 Four Continents
Short program	TES	63.42	2020 Four Continents
Short program	PCS	48.47	2019 Skate Canada
Free skating	**TSS**	**212.99**	2019 Skate Canada
Free skating	TES	116.59	2019 Skate Canada
Free skating	PCS	96.40	2019 Skate Canada

ISU personal best scores in the +3/-3 GOE System
Segment	Type	Score	Event
Total	**TSS**	**330.43**	2015–16 Grand Prix Final
Short program	**TSS**	**112.72**	2017 CS Autumn Classic
Short program	TES	64.17	2017 CS Autumn Classic
Short program	PCS	49.14	2015–16 Grand Prix Final
Free skating	**TSS**	**223.20**	2017 World Championships
Free skating	TES	126.12	2017 World Championships
Free skating	PCS	98.56	2015–16 Grand Prix Final

=== Senior level in the +5/-5 GOE System ===
- World record scores highlighted in **bold and italic**
- Small medals for the short program and free skating are only awarded at ISU Championships.
- Medals at team events are awarded for the team result only. The individual placement at the ISU World Team Trophy is listed in brackets.

Results in the 2018–19 season
Date	Event	SP		FS		Total		Details
Date	Event	P	Score	P	Score	P	Score	Details
Sep 20–22, 2018	(Canada) 2018 CS Autumn Classic International	1	97.74	2	165.91	1	263.65	Details
Nov 2–4, 2018	(Finland) 2018 Grand Prix of Helsinki	1	**106.69**	1	**190.43**	1	**297.12**	Details
Nov 16–18, 2018	(Russia) 2018 Rostelecom Cup	1	**110.53**	1	167.89	1	278.42	Details
Mar 18–24, 2019	(Japan) 2019 World Championships	3	94.87	2	**206.10**	2	**300.97**	Details

Results in the 2019–20 season
Date	Event	SP		FS		Total		Details
Date	Event	P	Score	P	Score	P	Score	Details
Sep 12–14, 2019	(Canada) 2019 CS Autumn Classic International	1	98.38	1	180.67	1	279.05	Details
Oct 25–27, 2019	2019 Skate Canada International	1	109.60	1	212.99	1	322.59	Details
Nov 22–24, 2019	(Japan) 2019 NHK Trophy	1	109.34	1	195.71	1	305.05	Details
Dec 5–8, 2019	(Italy) 2019–20 Grand Prix Final	2	97.43	2	194.00	2	291.43	Details
Dec 18–22, 2019	2019–20 Japan Championships	1	110.72	3	172.05	2	282.77	Details
Feb 4–9, 2020	(South Korea) 2020 Four Continents Championships	1	**111.82**	1	187.60	1	299.42	Details

Results in the 2020–21 season
Date	Event	SP		FS		Total		Details
Date	Event	P	Score	P	Score	P	Score	Details
Dec 24–27, 2020	2020–21 Japan Championships	1	103.53	1	215.83	1	319.36	Details
Mar 22–28, 2021	(Sweden) 2021 World Championships	1	106.98	4	182.20	3	289.18	Details
Apr 15–18, 2021	(Japan) 2021 World Team Trophy	2	107.12	2	193.76	3 (2)	300.88	Details

Results in the 2021–22 season
Date	Event	SP		FS		Total		Details
Date	Event	P	Score	P	Score	P	Score	Details
Dec 22–26, 2021	2021–22 Japan Championships	1	111.31	1	211.05	1	322.36	Details
Feb 8–10, 2022	(China) 2022 Winter Olympics	8	95.15	3	188.06	4	283.21	Details

=== Senior level in the +3/-3 GOE System ===
Results in the 2010–11 season
Date	Event	SP		FS		Total		Details
Date	Event	P	Score	P	Score	P	Score	Details
Oct 21–24, 2010	(Japan) 2010 NHK Trophy	5	69.31	4	138.41	4	207.72	Details
Nov 18–21, 2010	2010 Cup of Russia	6	70.24	6	132.42	7	202.66	Details
Dec 24–27, 2010	2010–11 Japan Championships	2	78.94	4	141.12	4	220.06	Details
Feb 15–20, 2011	(Chinese Taipei) 2011 Four Continents Championships	3	76.43	3	151.58	2	228.01	Details

Results in the 2011–12 season
Date	Event	SP		FS		Total		Details
Date	Event	P	Score	P	Score	P	Score	Details
Sep 21–24, 2011	(Germany) 2011 Nebelhorn Trophy	1	75.26	1	151.00	1	226.26	Details
Nov 4–6, 2011	2011 Cup of China	2	81.37	4	145.16	4	226.53	Details
Nov 25–27, 2011	(Russia) 2011 Rostelecom Cup	2	82.78	2	158.88	1	241.66	Details
Dec 8–11, 2011	(Canada) 2011–12 Grand Prix Final	4	79.33	3	166.49	4	245.82	Details
Dec 22–26, 2011	2011–12 Japan Championships	4	74.32	1	167.59	3	241.91	Details
Mar 26 – Apr 1, 2012	(France) 2012 World Championships	7	77.07	2	173.99	3	251.06	Details

Results in the 2012–13 season
Date	Event	SP		FS		Total		Details
Date	Event	P	Score	P	Score	P	Score	Details
Oct 4–7, 2012	(Finland) 2012 Finlandia Trophy	2	75.57	1	172.56	1	248.13	Details
Oct 19–21, 2012	(United States) 2012 Skate America	1	**95.07**	3	148.67	2	243.74	Details
Nov 23–25, 2012	(Japan) 2012 NHK Trophy	1	**95.32**	1	165.71	1	261.03	Details
Dec 6–9, 2012	(Russia) 2012–13 Grand Prix Final	3	87.17	2	177.12	2	264.29	Details
Dec 20–24, 2012	2012–13 Japan Championships	1	97.68	2	187.55	1	285.23	Details
Feb 8–11, 2013	(Japan) 2013 Four Continents Championships	1	87.65	3	158.73	2	246.38	Details
Mar 10–17, 2013	(Canada) 2013 World Championships	9	75.94	3	169.05	4	244.99	Details

Results in the 2013–14 season
Date	Event	SP		FS		Total		Details
Date	Event	P	Score	P	Score	P	Score	Details
Oct 4–6, 2013	(Finland) 2013 Finlandia Trophy	1	84.66	1	180.93	1	265.59	Details
Oct 25–27, 2013	2013 Skate Canada International	3	80.40	2	154.40	2	234.80	Details
Nov 15–17, 2013	(France) 2013 Trophée Éric Bompard	2	95.37	2	168.22	2	263.59	Details
Dec 5–8, 2013	(Japan) 2013–14 Grand Prix Final	1	**99.84**	1	193.41	1	293.25	Details
Dec 20–23, 2013	2013–14 Japan Championships	1	103.10	1	194.70	1	297.80	Details
Feb 6–9, 2014	(Russia) 2014 Winter Olympics – Team event	1	97.98	–	–	5	–	Details
Feb 13–14, 2014	(Russia) 2014 Winter Olympics	1	**101.45**	1	178.64	1	280.09	Details
Mar 24–30, 2014	(Japan) 2014 World Championships	3	91.24	1	191.35	1	282.59	Details

Results in the 2014–15 season
Date	Event	SP		FS		Total		Details
Date	Event	P	Score	P	Score	P	Score	Details
Nov 7–9, 2014	2014 Cup of China	2	82.95	2	154.60	2	237.55	Details
Nov 28–30, 2014	(Japan) 2014 NHK Trophy	5	78.01	3	151.79	4	229.80	Details
Dec 11–14, 2014	(Spain) 2014–15 Grand Prix Final	1	94.08	1	194.08	1	288.16	Details
Dec 26–28, 2014	2014–15 Japan Championships	1	94.36	1	192.50	1	286.86	Details
Mar 23–29, 2015	(China) 2015 World Championships	1	95.20	3	175.88	2	271.08	Details
Apr 16–19, 2015	(Japan) 2015 World Team Trophy	1	96.27	1	192.31	3 (1)	288.58	Details

Results in the 2015–16 season
Date	Event	SP		FS		Total		Details
Date	Event	P	Score	P	Score	P	Score	Details
Oct 13–15, 2015	(Canada) 2015 Autumn Classic International	1	93.14	1	184.05	1	277.19	Details
Oct 30 – Nov 1, 2015	2015 Skate Canada International	6	73.25	2	186.29	2	259.54	Details
Nov 27–29, 2015	(Japan) 2015 NHK Trophy	1	**106.33**	1	**216.07**	1	**322.40**	Details
Dec 10–13, 2015	(Spain) 2015–16 Grand Prix Final	1	**110.95**	1	**219.48**	1	**330.43**	Details
Dec 24–27, 2015	2015–16 Japan Championships	1	102.63	1	183.73	1	286.36	Details
Mar 28 – Apr 3, 2016	(United States) 2016 World Championships	1	110.56	2	184.61	2	295.17	Details

Results in the 2016–17 season
Date	Event	SP		FS		Total		Details
Date	Event	P	Score	P	Score	P	Score	Details
Sep 29 – Oct 1, 2016	(Canada) 2016 CS Autumn Classic International	1	88.30	1	172.27	1	260.57	Details
Oct 28–30, 2016	2016 Skate Canada International	4	79.65	1	183.41	2	263.06	Details
Nov 25–27, 2016	(Japan) 2016 NHK Trophy	1	103.89	1	197.58	1	301.47	Details
Dec 7–11, 2016	(France) 2016–17 Grand Prix Final	1	106.53	3	187.37	1	293.90	Details
Feb 14–19, 2017	(South Korea) 2017 Four Continents Championships	3	97.04	1	206.67	2	303.71	Details
Mar 29 – Apr 2, 2017	(Finland) 2017 World Championships	5	98.39	1	**223.20**	1	321.59	Details
Apr 20–23, 2017	(Japan) 2017 World Team Trophy	7	83.51	1	200.49	1 (3)	284.00	Details

Results in the 2017–18 season
Date	Event	SP		FS		Total		Details
Date	Event	P	Score	P	Score	P	Score	Details
Sep 20–23, 2017	(Canada) 2017 CS Autumn Classic International	1	**112.72**	5	155.52	2	268.24	Details
Oct 20–22, 2017	(Russia) 2017 Rostelecom Cup	2	94.85	1	195.92	2	290.77	Details
Feb 16–17, 2018	(South Korea) 2018 Winter Olympics	1	111.68	2	206.17	1	317.85	Details

=== Junior level ===
Results in the 2008–09 season
Date	Event	SP		FS		Total		Details
Date	Event	P	Score	P	Score	P	Score	Details
Sep 3–7, 2008	(Italy) 2008 JGP Merano	6	51.06	4	95.62	5	146.68	Details
Nov 23–24, 2008	2008–09 Japan Junior Championships	4	57.25	1	124.92	1	182.17	Details
Dec 25–27, 2008	2008–09 Japan Senior Championships	8	64.50	5	117.15	8	181.65	Details
Feb 23 – Mar 1, 2009	(Bulgaria) 2009 World Junior Championships	11	58.18	13	103.59	12	161.77	Details

Results in the 2009–10 season
Date	Event	SP		FS		Total		Details
Date	Event	P	Score	P	Score	P	Score	Details
Sep 9–13, 2009	(Poland) 2009 JGP Torun Cup	1	66.77	1	131.88	1	198.65	Details
Oct 7–11, 2009	2009 JGP Croatia Cup	1	70.78	1	130.37	1	201.15	Details
Nov 22–23, 2009	2009–10 Japan Junior Championships	1	76.00	2	118.15	1	194.15	Details
Dec 3–6, 2009	(Japan) 2009–10 Junior Grand Prix Final	3	69.85	1	136.92	1	206.77	Details
Dec 24–27, 2009	2009–10 Japan Senior Championships	13	57.99	5	137.23	6	195.22	Details
Mar 8–14, 2010	(Netherlands) 2010 World Junior Championships	3	68.75	1	147.35	1	216.10	Details

== See also ==
Competition statistics

- List of Olympic medalists in figure skating
- World Figure Skating Championships cumulative medal count
- Grand Slam (figure skating)

Other statistics

- List of highest scores in figure skating
- List of highest historical scores in figure skating
- List of ISU Season's World Ranking statistics

== Notes and references ==
=== Books and magazines cited ===
- Hanyu, Yuzuru (March 1, 2018). 夢を生きる [Live your dream] (in Japanese). Chiyoda, Tokyo: Chuokoron-Shinsha. ISBN 978-4120050497.
- Russell, Susan D. (September 6, 2022). "Yuzuru Hanyu – An icon leaves the competitive stage". International Figure Skating. Denville Township, New Jersey. pp. 22–33. IFSISS22-05.
