= Prologue (ice show) =

2022 ice show in Japan

- Ice show type: Solo show
- Format: Figure skating performances and video segments
- Theme: Yuzuru Hanyu's skating career flashback
- Duration: 90 min
- Start date: November 4, 2022
- End date: December 5, 2022
- No. of shows: 5
- Country: Japan
- Venue: Pia Arena MM; Flat Hachinohe
- Attendance: 24,800
- Cinema live viewing: Japan
- Broadcast: TV Asahi
- Producer: Yuzuru Hanyu (performer)
- Organizer: Team Sirius; CIC; TV Asahi
- Sponsor: Towa Pharmaceutical (Yokohama shows); Kosé; Ajinomoto; Nishikawa
- Website: prologue-official.jp

Yuzuru Hanyu article series
- Skating career: Olympic seasons; Career achievements; Figure skating programs
- Other works: Bibliography
- Solo ice shows: Prologue; Gift; Repray Tour; Echoes of Life Tour; Realive
- Ensemble ice shows: Fantasy on Ice; Continues with Wings; Yuzuru Hanyu Notte Stellata

Prologue (プロローグ) was a solo ice show by Japanese figure skater and two-time consecutive Olympic champion Yuzuru Hanyu in 2022, organized by his management company Team Sirius in partnership with CIC and TV Asahi. The show was held in two cities at Pia Arena MM in Yokohama on November 4–5 and Flat Hachinohe in Hachinohe on December 2–3, and 5.

It was the first solo ice show in the sport of figure skating and served as a prologue to the Yuzuru Hanyu Ice Story series, produced and directed by Hanyu himself in collaboration with Japanese choreographer Mikiko. Each show had a duration of 90 minutes and featured eight to ten programs performed at the athletic level of skating competitions, opening with an unconventional six-minute warm-up session and a challenge of Hanyu's winning free skate program Seimei at the 2018 Winter Olympics. Koki Nakamura, the 2022 world champion and virtuoso on the tsugaru-shamisen, co-starred as a guest artist.

Prologue was sold out by lottery with a total of 24,800 spectators in attendance. The final show in each venue was screened live at cinemas in Japan and aired live on the subscription channel CS TV Asahi. The broadcast of the Hachinohe show was awarded the Grand Prize in the category "best relay broadcast" at the 13th JSBA Original Programs Awards in June 2023. A compilation on DVD and Blu-ray was released in July 2024.

== Background ==
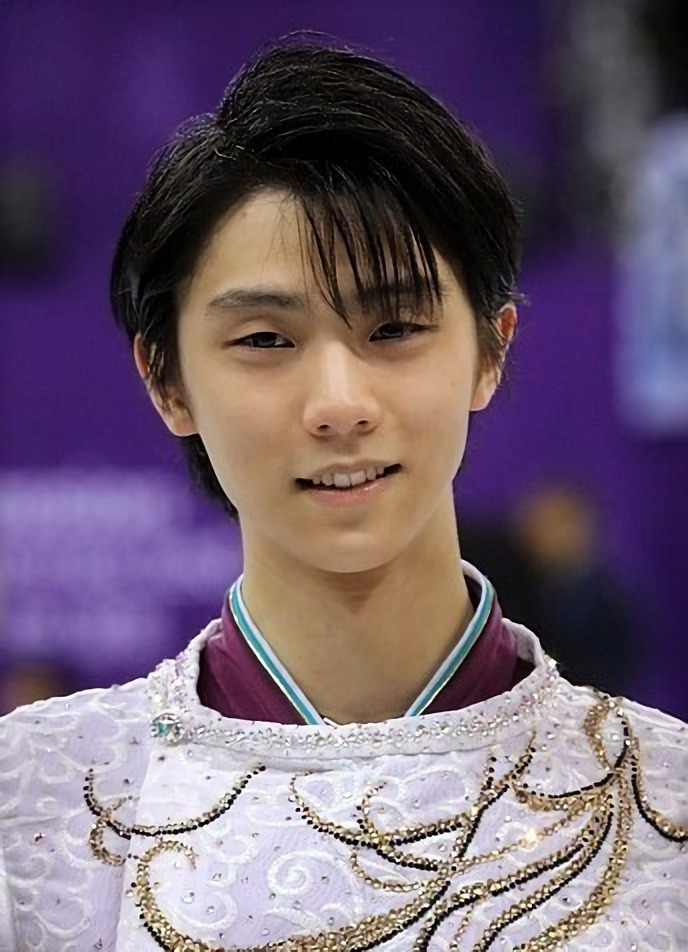
Yuzuru Hanyu at the 2018 Winter Olympics

Yuzuru Hanyu is a Japanese figure skater and ice show producer who competed in the men's singles discipline and turned professional on July 19, 2022. Regarded as one of the greatest skaters in the sport's history, he is the first two-time Olympic men's champion in 66 years with back-to-back gold medals at the 2014 and 2018 Winter Olympics and the first male single skater to complete the Super Slam, having won all major international senior and junior titles in the course of his career.

Prologue was the first solo ice show to be produced and presented in figure skating, with Hanyu as the only scheduled skater, which was an unusual approach compared to established show formats. The first major era of ice shows, headlined by Ice Follies and Ice Capades from the 1930s to 1980s, typically featured large skating ensembles inspired by ballet and theater. In the late 1980s, the ice show landscape experienced a shift towards smaller casts and individual performances by elite international skaters, including multiple Olympic and World champions. However, the production of a solo ice show was considered impractical due to the physical limits of skating and performing. As remarked by Russian world champion Elizaveta Tuktamysheva, even three programs in one show are physically very challenging to skate.

While in high-profile sports like soccer or tennis professional players are expected to be superior to amateurs in terms of athleticism and technical skills, in figure skating it is the opposite—skaters with amateur status participate in elite sports competitions, professionals perform in exhibitions and ice shows. The transition usually comes with a decline in athletic fitness and a shift in focus from the execution of technically difficult elements to the development of performing art skills. Hence, it is common practice among skating experts and journalists to talk about "retirement", when skaters announce the end of their competitive careers, regardless of their future plans as professionals. With Prologue, Hanyu hoped to trigger a change in perception of professional figure skating and produce an ice show that could match the athletic merit and tension of major skating competitions like the Winter Olympics or World Championships.

== Show dates and venues ==
Prologue was scheduled to be held in late 2022 at Pia Arena MM in Yokohama on November 4–5 and Flat Hachinohe in Hachinohe on December 2–3. Due to the small venue capacity and high ticket demand for the Hachinohe shows, a third performance on December 5 was added to the initial schedule.

Though the choice of venues was not intentional, Hanyu expressed his gratitude to skate in the two cities again. In March 2011, he experienced the Tohoku earthquake and tsunami disaster (commonly referred to as 3.11), the most powerful earthquake recorded in Japan, which cost more than 19,000 people's lives, as well as the following aftershock known as the April 2011 Miyagi earthquake. Forced to leave his severely damaged home rink in Sendai, skating facilities in Yokohama and Hachinohe offered him a place to practice and prepare for the 2011–12 figure skating season.

Chronological list of show dates and venues of Prologue
Date	Venue	Location	Seat. capacity	Max. capacity	Image	Ref.
Nov 4–5, 2022	Pia Arena MM	Yokohama (Kanagawa)	7,900	12,141	Outdoor view of Pia Arena MM	
Dec 2–3, 5, 2022	Flat Hachinohe	Hachinohe (Aomori)	3,000	5,000	Outdoor view of Flat Hachinohe	

== Promotion and ticket sales ==
Prologue was officially announced on September 30, 2022, at 11:11 local time through Hanyu's newly launched profiles on Instagram and Twitter. Hanyu, who consequently stayed away from social media during his competitive skating career, eventually decided to run accounts as the main communication platform for future projects. The show's announcement was reported by various national and international news outlets, such as Japan's major daily newspapers and the Olympic Games' official website, with large resonance among journalists and fans, who had been eagerly anticipating the two-time Olympic champions' debut on social media and his first performance as a professional skater.

Known for his preference to surprise his fans and hold back information until the last minute, Hanyu only revealed the title, logo, and broad topic of the show, stating: "For my first time, I will be performing a one-man ice show. I hope to make it a show where people will be able to get a feel for what my skating career has been like." One month prior to the opening performance in Yokohama, a skating video of his junior exhibition program "Change" and a new, self-choreographed program to the music piece "Yumemiru shokei" by MoppySound was recorded at his practice rink in Sendai and uploaded as a teaser to his YouTube-channel.

Ticket sales were handled by the show's official organizer TV Asahi and staggered into two application rounds, with the pre-sales periods having started about one month prior to the respective show. All tickets were sold by lottery, with prices ranging from ¥15,000 for stand A seats to ¥25,000 for premier seats (US$100–170 as of October 2022).

== Production ==
Prologue was produced and directed by Hanyu himself, who was responsible for the global conception of the show as well as the selection of music, skating programs, costumes, video footage and more. He received professional advice and support by renowned Japanese choreographer Mikiko, who served as a director for two programs. Mikiko is internationally known for her collaboration with the J-pop trio Perfume and her involvement in the Tokyo handover segment at the 2016 Summer Olympics closing ceremony among other works. Upon the success of Prologue, she directed all main installments of the Yuzuru Hanyu Ice Story series, including the large-scale solo ice show Gift at Tokyo Dome in February 2023.

Prologue was organized by Hanyu's private management company Team Sirius in partnership with TV Asahi, Japan's most viewed television broadcasting network alongside Nippon TV in 2022, and CIC, an event organization company that has successfully produced a variety of ice shows, such as Fantasy on Ice or Dreams on Ice. The event was sponsored by the Japanese multinational cosmetics brand Kosé, the food and biotechnology corporation Ajinomoto, and the domestic bedding manufacturer Nishikawa. The Yokohama shows received special sponsorship by Towa Pharmaceutical.

=== Conception and making ===
Prologue was designed as a flashback-performance, reflecting on Hanyu's competitive skating career, which spanned a total of 19 seasons from 2004 to 2022, and was based on the revival of past programs, presented in a new shape with a fresh, professional approach. The show also served as a prologue and test event for Gift, a solo performance of 150 minutes length, which was already in the making by late 2022. Hanyu selected the title "Prologue" to underline that his transition from competitive to professional skating means no end but the beginning of a new chapter in his career. He also stressed that his challenging mindset has not changed and that he still feels like an athlete preparing for competitions.

In order to fill a 90-minute solo show with a sufficient amount of skating, Hanyu had to increase his training workload, both on and off the ice. The preparations included a significant improvement of his stamina and physical endurance as well as a new approach to commitment and pacing, stating: "I'm used to emptying the tank for one skate. I've never thought about heading back out immediately after. But I managed to add the strength and stamina I needed to get through it all." Hanyu presented eight to ten programs per show, preceded by a six-minute warm-up session, which added up to near half an hour of net skating time—almost tripling the individual performance duration at a conventional ice show. Some programs were trimmed in length and technical content, taking care that their athletic quality and artistic appeal did not suffer.

The show was structured in a way that Hanyu had enough time for costume changes and physical recovery between his skating performances. The remaining 60 minutes were bridged with video segments shown on screen and an interactive Q&A-session, moderated by TV Asahi's sports reporter Momo Ando. The selected video material included private recordings as well as official broadcasting footage, provided by the International Skating Union (ISU), the Japan Skating Federation (JSF), and domestic television networks.

=== Music, programs, and costumes ===
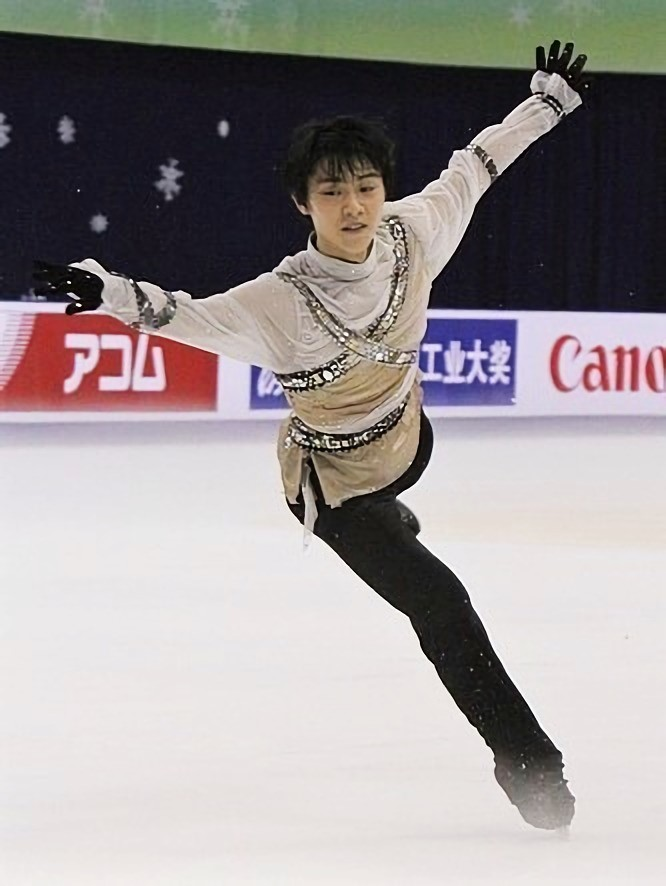
Hanyu in the costume of his free skate program Romeo + Juliet in 2011

The music selection was a balanced mix of Hanyu's former competition and exhibition programs from novice to senior level, covering a wide range of genres, such as classical pieces, pop, blues rock, swing, traditional Japanese music, film and video game soundtracks. Hanyu was actively involved in the music editing and collaborated with Japanese sound designer Keiichi Yano, who served as a music director for the show. Koki Nakamura co-starred as a guest artist who was the reigning world champion on the tsugaru-shamisen, a traditional Japanese instrument with three strings similar to a banjo-lute.

With the program selection, Hanyu paid tribute to his former choreographers, among them his Japanese coaches Shoichiro Tsuzuki and Nanami Abe, Russian figure skaters Natalia Bestemianova and Igor Bobrin as well as Canadian skaters and elite choreographers Jeffrey Buttle, Shae-Lynn Bourne, and David Wilson. Three of the five presented costumes were reused from Hanyu's competition days without any further adjustments, which was a testament to his stoic training regimen. The oldest one dated from the 2011–12 season and was made for his free skate program to Craig Armstrong's movie soundtrack Romeo + Juliet. The other four costumes were made by Japanese fashion designer Satomi Ito, who created two pieces exclusively for the show.

=== Ice rink, installations, and technology ===
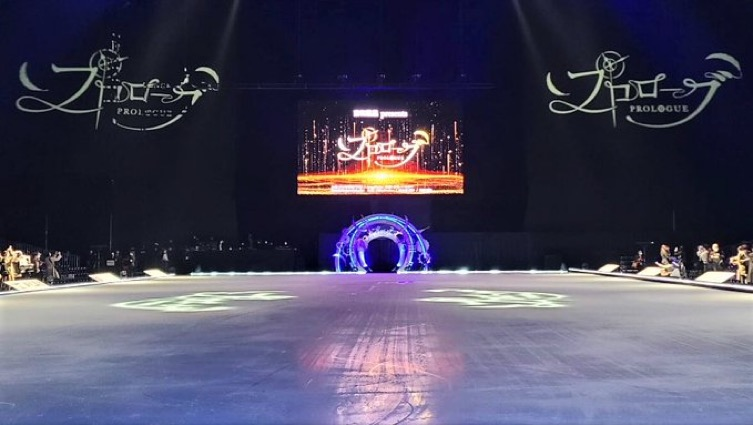
Front view of the ice rink at the Prologue opening show in Yokohama

While the Hachinohe venue was fitted with a permanent ice rink, the multipurpose arena in Yokohama required the installation of a mobile rink, provided by the Tokyo-based company Patine Leasure. With an area of 55 m × 24 m, the ice surface was larger than usual for ice shows and measured about 73 % the size of an Olympic figure skating rink (60 m × 30 m), which allowed Hanyu to perform at competitive level with little to no limitations in skating speed or ice coverage. At the rink's main entrance, a decorative, clock-shaped archway was erected, matching the show's concept and logo in design. For the video segments, a big screen was placed on the rink's short side in Yokohama and on the long side in Hachinohe, supported by a smaller, cubic screen on the ceiling.

Notable was the implementation of projection mapping in two programs, directed by Mikiko with the visuals created by Rizomatiks. The skating was filmed from a distant, aerial perspective, so that it could be captured together with the projected text elements and images. Hanyu used this technology in his new, self-choreographed program to the music piece "Itsuka owaru yume" (engl. 'A Fleeting Dream') from the video game Final Fantasy X. The choreography was motivated by his practice cool-down routines, which enjoyed great popularity among fans. The projection mapping was also implemented in his exhibition program to the song "Haru yo, koi" by Yumi Matsutoya, recorded as a piano version by Shinya Kiyozuka. The spectators were handed special LED-wristbands with an integrated switch to manually change their color. This gimmick was used for an interactive live voting round, choosing one program for Hanyu to skate on each day, and to illuminate the arena in color schemes that corresponded to his costumes.

== Show synopsis ==
Each show of Prologue lasted 90 minutes, which is about 30–60 minutes less than the duration of larger touring ice shows, such as Stars on Ice or Fantasy on Ice. Due to the shortened performance time, there was no intermission or ice resurfacing during the show. In terms of content, Prologue was divided into four main parts that highlighted key events of Hanyu's skating career and illustrated his transition from competitive to professional skating.

=== Main show ===
==== Competitive skating part ====
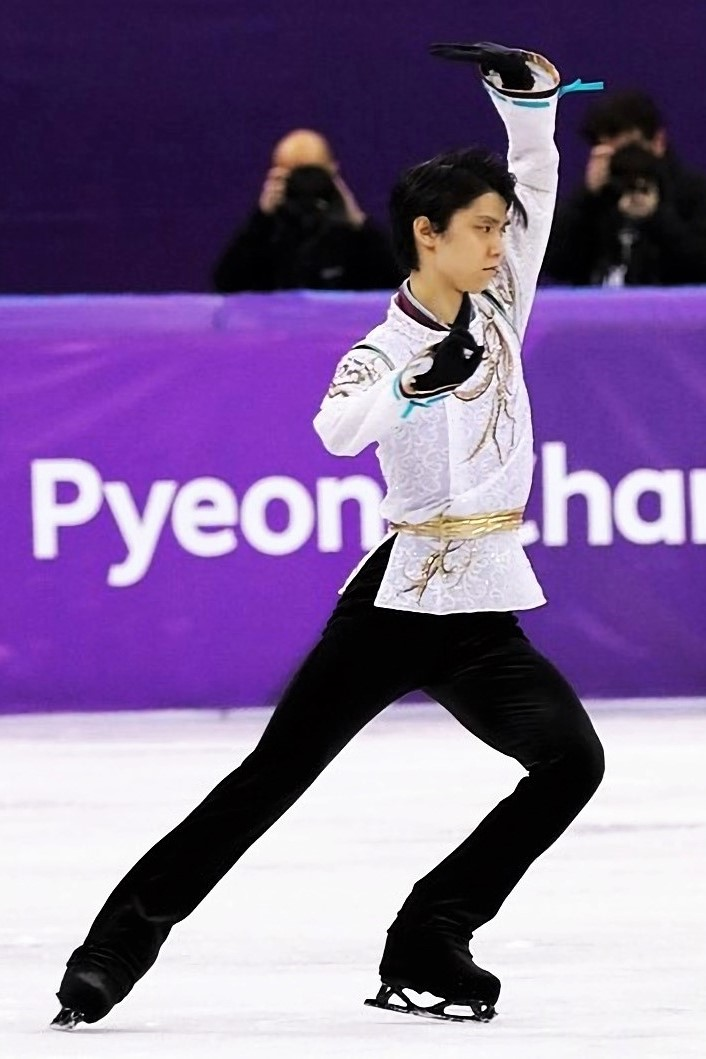
Hanyu's signature free skate program Seimei at the 2018 Winter Olympics

The show opened with a video excerpt from Hanyu's official press conference held on July 19, 2022, where he announced the conclusion of his competitive skating career. His speech was followed by a compilation of short clips that showed him at various figure skating competitions on ice and backstage. The video segment was set to the music of Hanyu's free skate program Romeo and Juliet, composed by Nino Rota, which earned him his first gold medals at the Winter Olympics, World Championships, and the Grand Prix Final in the 2013–14 season.

At full arena lighting, Hanyu entered the ice rink in his training jacket and was formally introduced over the loudspeakers by announcer Momo Ando, recreating the setting and atmosphere of a skating competition. He launched the show with a six-minute warm-up session and practiced multiple difficult figure skating jumps, which is an established part of competitions, but unusual for ice shows. The warm-up was accompanied by an extended music edit of Hanyu's free skate program Heaven and Earth, which he performed at the 2022 Winter Olympics among others. Mid-practice, he took the jacket off to reveal his costume for the upcoming performance—a ritual that enjoyed great popularity among fans in his competition days.

The first part of Prologue culminated in a full four-minute reprise of Hanyu's signature free skate program Seimei from the movies Onmyoji I and II, which earned him his second Olympic title, first Four Continents title, and the highest total score to be achieved by any skater in the former ISU Judging System with 330.95 points. (Note: With the change of the ISU Judging System in 2018, the International Skating Union decided to start the recording of highest scores statistics from zero and declared all records historical that were achieved before the 2018–19 season.) The costume was the original from his winning performance at the 2018 Winter Olympics. After the program challenge, Hanyu left the arena, and the lights turned off, which marked the conclusion of the competitive skating part of the show.

==== Collaborative and interactive part ====
The second part summarized Hanyu's early life and skating career from novice to junior level. The opening video compilation featured photographs and short clips from his childhood, set to the music of his novice free skate program From Russia with Love, composed by John Barry. The segment finished with a full recording of Hanyu's winning free skate at the 2010 World Junior Championships, performed to Sergei Rachmaninoff's Rhapsody on a Theme of Paganini. Then the spotlights moved to a small stage at the rinkside, where Koki Nakamura played a captivating solo on the tsugaru-shamisen. Towards the end of his performance, Hanyu re-entered the venue in a new, black-and-red costume and reprised his junior exhibition program "Change" by Monkey Majik and the Yoshida Brothers, accompanied live by Nakamura on the shamisen.

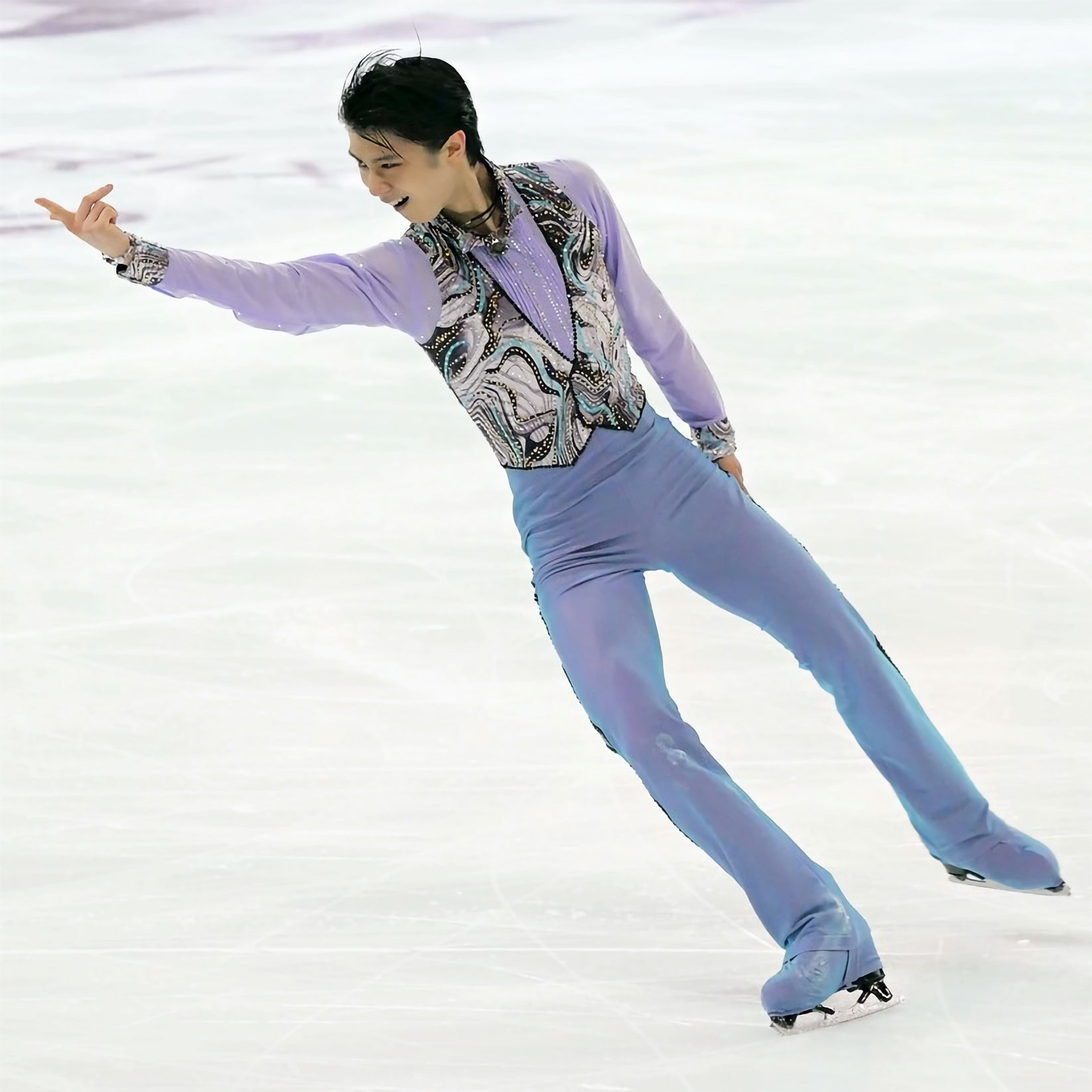
Hanyu's short program "Let's Go Crazy" at the 2016–17 Grand Prix Final

The show continued with an interactive Q&A-session, moderated by Momo Ando, where Hanyu answered three selected fan questions per day from more than 27,000 online submissions. After the talk round, spectators at the venue were asked to pick one of five different programs from his competitive skating career by using the distributed LED-wristbands. The program titles appeared on screen together with their associated colors, based on the respective costume designs.

- Étude in D-sharp minor: Blue (青)
  (2011–12 short program)
- From Russia with Love: White (白)
  (2004–06 free skate program)
- "Otoñal": Light blue / water (水)
  (2018–19 short program)
- "Let's Go Crazy": Purple (紫)
  (2016–17 short program)
- "Hana ni nare": Green (緑)
  (2012–13 exhibition program)

Hanyu's short program to the 80s' Prince-hit "Let's Go Crazy" won each voting in Yokohama, while his world record-breaking short program "Otoñal" by Raúl di Blasio was selected twice in Hachinohe. Due to the limitations in physical endurance and stamina, the programs were shortened to about one minute net skating time, only performing the characteristic step sequence and final spin. To cover the other voting options as well, Hanyu gave bonus performances on the final days in each venue. The interactive part of Prologue was concluded with a program from his early career, determined by an online fan voting on his official YouTube-channel. He skated to a different song on each day, such as the big band-classic "Sing, Sing, Sing" by Louis Prima.

==== 3.11 commemoration part ====
The third main part of the show was focusing on Hanyu's first two seasons at senior level, which were fundamentally shaped by the 2011 Tohoku earthquake and tsunami disaster. A television news segment followed by a compilation of photographs and short clips showed the devastation of the affected areas, including the severe damages at Hanyu's home rink in Sendai. The video segment was set to the piano piece "Requiem of Heaven and Earth", composed by Yasunobu Matsuo as a tribute to the victims of the disaster. On the final day of the Hachinohe show, the compilation was preceded by a live skating performance of Hanyu's 2011–12 short program Étude in D-sharp minor, composed by Alexander Scriabin. The program was created in Hachinohe few weeks after the earthquake, which made it a matter of the heart for Hanyu to perform it at that particular place.

The video segment continued with a full recording of his short program "White Legend", a variation of Piotr Tchaikosky's Swan Lake performed by violinist Ikuko Kawai. The selected footage showed Hanyu's first public performance after the disaster at a charity event in Kobe in April 2011. The third part of Prologue culminated in a reprise of his 2011–12 free skate program Romeo + Juliet, which was arranged as a unique split performance. In the first minute, a recording from the 2011–12 Grand Prix Final was shown on screen, the remaining three and a half minutes were skated live by Hanyu at the venue. He presented the same choreography and technical elements as 11 years ago, demonstrating his longevity and growth as an athlete over a decade.

==== Professional skating part ====
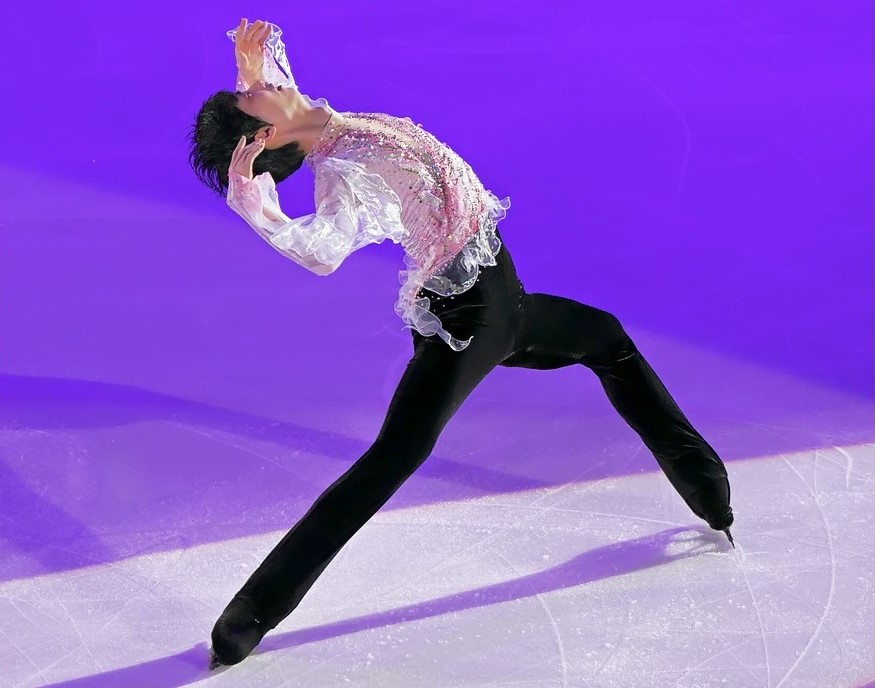
Hanyu performing his exhibition program "Haru yo, koi" at the 2018 Grand Prix of Helsinki

The fourth and final part of Prologue was a look back at Hanyu's three Olympic cycles and gave a first impression of his new career path as a professional skater. The first video segment, set to the music piece "Noir" by MoppySound, summarized his major achievements as a competitive skater, including his back-to-back Olympic titles and the first ratified quadruple loop jump in international competition.

In the next section, Hanyu reflected on the overarching challenge of his third and last Olympic cycle—the pursuit of the quadruple Axel, a jump of extraordinary difficulty with four and a half revolutions in the air that no figure skater had landed in competition until then. Hanyu's closest attempt was the opening jump of his free skate at the 2022 Winter Olympics, however, due to a fall and missing quarter of a rotation at the landing, it was not officially ratified by the ISU. In his first professional skating program "Yumemiru shokei" (lit. 'Dreamy aspiration'), which was shown as a recording on screen, he conveyed his childhood dream of landing the quad Axel. The subsequent live performance to "Itsuka owaru yume" (lit. 'A dream that ends one day') depicted his inner conflict of still wanting to pursue his dream, but feeling too exhausted and mentally drained to continue. The traces of his skating patterns were visually matched with various projections, such as growing trees and dynamic text elements. The final video segment, set to the song "Sasanqua" by Sekai no Owari, showed various attempts of the quad Axel as well as some of Hanyu's most severe falls, accidents, and injuries, including his horrible collision in the warm-up at the 2014 Cup of China.

The main show closed with a full performance to "Haru yo, koi" (lit. 'Come, spring'), which Hanyu had skated in every season since its debut in 2018, including the 2019 World Championships and the 2022 Winter Olympics. His skating was aesthetically complemented by the projection of cherry blossoms and other visuals onto the ice. The program was a counterpart to "Itsuka owaru yume", conveying the longing for "spring to come in the midst of winter that will end someday". After the performance, a big clock was shown on screen with its hands moving from 11:11 to 11:12, which marked the end of Prologue and the beginning of a new chapter in Hanyu's professional career.

=== Encore and finale ===
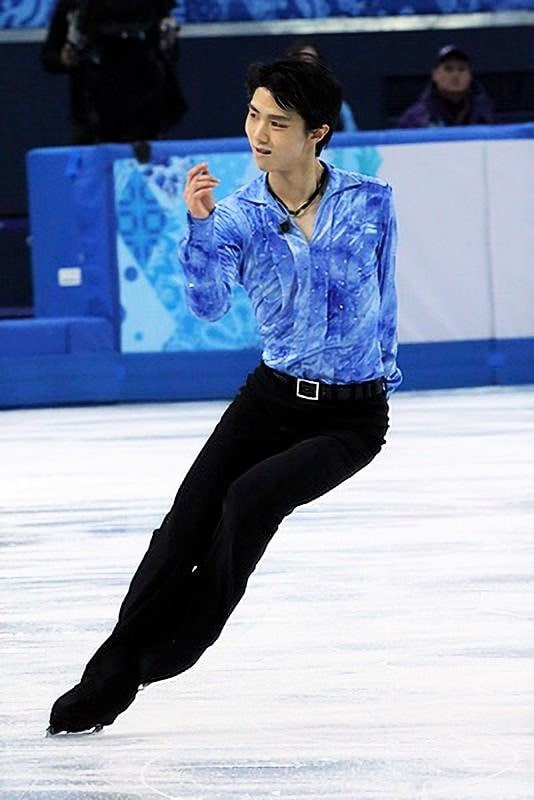
Hanyu's short program "Parisienne Walkways" at the 2014 Winter Olympics

The show's finale opened with an electric guitar solo of Gary Moore's blues rock song "Parisienne Walkways", playing from the sound boxes. Hanyu's short program to the music piece was the first in history to score above 100 points, achieved at the 2014 Winter Olympics, and became a popular exhibition number the following years. At dimmed arena lighting, Hanyu returned to the ice and performed the step sequence and final spin as an encore. The show concluded with a farewell round to the song "Watashi wa saikyou" (engl. 'I'm Invincible') by Japanese singer Ado.

On the final day of Prologue in Hachinohe, Hanyu gave a short surprise performance of his novice program From Russia with Love, presenting the final spin and iconic ending pose, which was the same as in his last competitive program Heaven and Earth. A video of his free skate from 2004 was shown on screen, mirroring his alter ego live at the venue. At the end of the show, Hanyu revealed his next solo ice show production Gift at Tokyo Dome. The audience, who was asked to hold back with loud cheers and screams as a countermeasure during the COVID-19 pandemic, erupted in thunderous applause when the announcement appeared on the big screen.

== Athletic merit and records ==
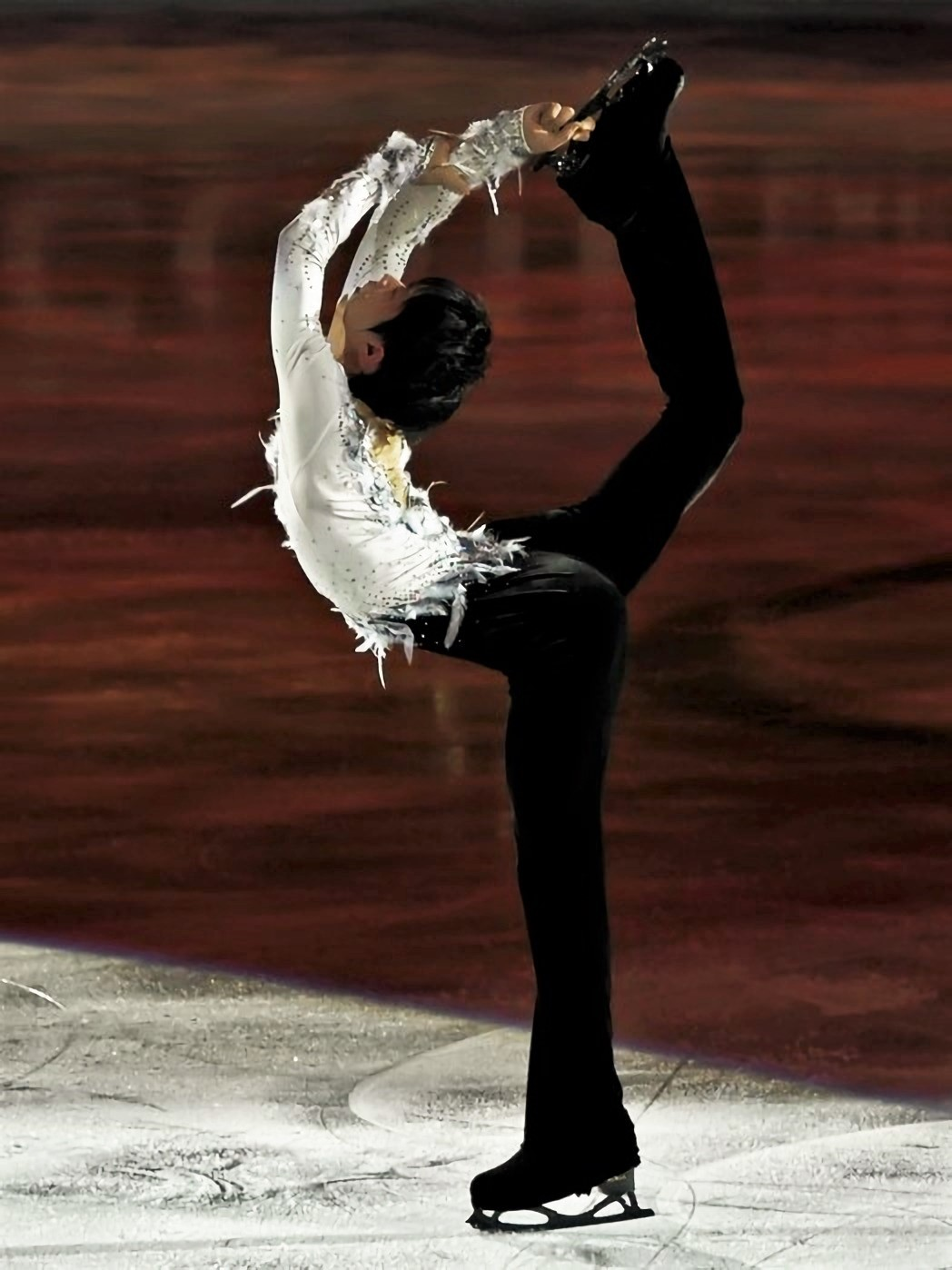
Hanyu performing a Biellmann spin in 2019

Despite the physical strain of a 90-minute solo show, the presented athletic content levelled the difficulty and tripled the number of technical elements of a competitive free skate program in the men's singles discipline. Hanyu's opening program Seimei featured two types of quadruple jumps and three triple Axels—elements of high technical difficulty that are rarely attempted by women and the riskiest to perform for men in competition. Even top skaters like multiple world champions Stéphane Lambiel and Patrick Chan struggled to stabilize the Axel with its challenging forward take-off throughout their careers. The flexible show setting allowed Hanyu to circumvent the narrow repetition rules for jumps in competition and include more than two triple Axels in one program. On the first day of Prologue in Yokohama, he also executed a clean quadruple toe loop-single Euler-triple Salchow combination in the six-minute warm-up session, which was the second highest scored element in the men's world record free skate as of December 2022, performed by US-American Nathan Chen at the 2019–20 Grand Prix Final.

Other than jump elements, Prologue notably featured multiple Biellmann spins that require high flexibility in back and hips, which makes them very rare to see among men, especially at later age. Hanyu also performed intricate step and choreo sequences and a variety of energy-consuming skating moves like the hydroblading or Ina Bauer, showcasing his versatility, longevity, and improved physical endurance as a professional. He managed to skate multiple shows cleanly without making major mistakes, which was a tremendous athletic feat, considering that he only performed three free skates with all-positive grades of execution in international competition. According to Hanyu, the priority at Prologue was to adapt to the new show format and get through the planned content without injuries or overstrain, which he pulled off successfully.

- BV – Numeric base value of a technical figure skating element in accordance with the ISU Scale of Values
- The statistics only consider the duration and content of performed programs. Warm-up sessions are not included.
- For better comparability, each jump is counted individually within a combination or sequence.

Athletic comparison of Prologue and the highest scored performance in men's singles by December 2022
Performance	Prologue (Hachinohe, day 3)	ISU Grand Prix Final (Men's free skating, Nathan Chen)
Event date	December 5, 2022	December 7, 2019
Net skating time	22:30	4:00
Number of programs	10 (av. 2:15)	1
Number of jumps	20 (2 quads, 5 triple Axels)	11 (5 quads, 1 triple Axel)
Number of spins	15	3
Step & choreo sequences	7	2
Highest valued element	3A+1Eu+3S (BV 14.03 X)	4F+3T (BV 15.20)

== Resonance and impact ==
=== Critical reception, awards, and cultural impact ===
Prologue received universal acclaim among elite skaters and journalists, both in Japan and overseas. Three-time world champion Patrick Chan from Canada was amazed by Hanyu's accomplishment of performing a solo ice show and pointed out his exceptional physical endurance, stating: "Just one person, without any group dancing in the middle? How is that possible? I think, Yuzu is the only person in the world who can do that. It's unbelievable stamina." Japanese National champion Takahito Mura praised Hanyu's skills as a producer and director, especially his attention to detail and ability to turn ambitious ideas into reality. Various news outlets complimented the high quality and technical difficulty of his solo performances, particularly the feat to skate full shows without major mistakes on multiple days, which earned him standing ovations from the audience. Renowned Japanese sports journalist Takaomi Matsubara described Prologue as a show, where elaborate staging and intricate skating were merged like "never seen before", painting a world that could be called "monumental".

In June 2023, the broadcast of the final show in Hachinohe was awarded the Grand Prize in the category "best relay broadcast" at the 13th Original Programs Awards, presented by the Japan Satellite Broadcasting Association (JSBA). Yohei Goto, member of the judging panel and the Asahi Shimbun's editorial department, named Hanyu's captivating performance skills and the show's universal appeal as the deciding factors, which attracted both long-time figure skating fans as well as casual viewers. He also appreciated the comprehensive behind-the-scenes footage, which is rarely shown in competition broadcasts.

The conception of Prologue left a notable impact on other ice show productions. At Dreams on Ice, an annual ensemble show founded with the purpose to provide competitive skaters a place to practice and perform to a live audience during the off-season, the six-minute warm-up and skating at full arena lighting were both implemented for the first time in 2024. The show featured multiple world champions, including Kaori Sakamoto from Japan and Ilia Malinin from the United States.

=== Commercial performance and economic impact ===
All five shows of Prologue were sold out by lottery, with 7,900 spectators in attendance in Yokohama and 3,000 in Hachinohe on each day. The final performances in both venues were screened live in movie theaters nationwide, with 81 participating cinemas on November 5 and 77 on December 5. The two shows were also aired live, the other three delayed in 2023, on CS TV Asahi, which led to a significant increase in subscribers to the Japanese television network. Compared to the main installments of the Yuzuru Hanyu Ice Story series, international live streaming was not available. The final performance in Hachinohe was re-broadcast on TV Asahi's terrestrial channel on April 9, 2023, presenting exclusive behind-the-scenes footage and a documentary of the show. The broadcast content was also released on DVD and Blu-ray on the second anniversary of Hanyu's professional skating career on July 19, 2024, featuring a special digital photo book. It sold more than 11,000 copies in the first week, ranking second on Oricon's Blu-ray weekly chart and fourth on the DVD weekly chart.

Prologue led to a significant boost of local economy, particularly in Hachinohe and the rural region of Aomori Prefecture. Hotels remained fully booked for four days, which forced some visitors to stay in the city of Morioka in about 100 km driving distance. Despite cold temperatures, the venue's outdoor merchandise area was bustling as well as several tourist hot spots across the city. According to a research study conducted by Shinya Koto, professor at Yamaguchi University's Faculty of Economics, the estimated revenues from Hanyu's performances in his first season as a professional skater amount to ¥12.6 billion (US$88.2 million as of July 2023), which also include his ice show productions Gift and Yuzuru Hanyu Notte Stellata as well as his participations in Stars on Ice and Fantasy on Ice.

== Attendance and distribution ==
- Attendance numbers do not include cinema live viewing events.
- Broadcast dates refer to the premiere on the subscription channel CS TV Asahi.

Chronological list of show dates, attendance, and broadcasting
Date	Location	Attendance	Cinema	Broadcast premiere	Ref.
Nov 4, 2022	Yokohama (Kanagawa)	7,900	—	Jan 1, 2023	
Nov 5, 2022	Yokohama (Kanagawa)	7,900	Live	Live	
Dec 2, 2022	Hachinohe (Aomori)	3,000	—	Feb 12, 2023	
Dec 3, 2022	Hachinohe (Aomori)	3,000	—	Mar 26, 2023	
Dec 5, 2022	Hachinohe (Aomori)	3,000	Live	Live	
Total		24,800			

== Set list ==
Main show

1. Seimei
  (from Onmyōji I and II by Shigeru Umebayashi)
2. "Change"
  (by Monkey Majik and the Yoshida Brothers;
  performed live by Koki Nakamura)
3. Fans' program choice 1: Live arena voting
4. Fans' program choice 2: YouTube voting
5. Romeo + Juliet
  (by Craig Armstrong)
6. "Itsuka owaru yume" (engl. "A Fleeting Dream")
  (from Final Fantasy X by Nobuo Uematsu and Masashi Hamauzu)
7. "Haru yo, koi"
  (by Yumi Matsutoya, piano version by Shinya Kiyozuka)

Encore

8. "Parisienne Walkways"
  (by Gary Moore; step sequence)
9. From Russia with Love
  (by John Barry; Hachinohe, day 3)

Live arena voting

- "Let's Go Crazy"
  (by Prince; Yokohama, day 1 & 2)
- "Hana ni nare"
  (by Fumiya Sashida; Yokohama, day 2)
- "Otoñal"
  (by Raúl di Blasio; Hachinohe, day 1 & 3)
- Étude in D-sharp minor
  (by Alexander Scriabin; Hachinohe, day 2 & 3)

YouTube voting

- Spartacus
  (by Aram Kachaturian; Yokohama, day 1)
- "Hello, I Love You"
  (by The Doors, remix by Adam Freeland; Yokohama, day 2)
- Mission: Impossible II
  (by Hans Zimmer; Hachinohe, day 1)
- "Somebody to Love"
  (by Justin Bieber; Hachinohe, day 2)
- "Sing, Sing, Sing"
  (by Louis Prima; Hachinohe, day 3)

== Notes and references ==
=== Official guide and documentary books ===
- Hasegawa, Hitomi (November 1, 2022a). 「プロローグ」オフィシャルガイドブック [Prologue – official guidebook] (in Japanese). Shibuya, Tokyo: Axel Entermedia Co., Ltd. ID 3410.
- Hasegawa, Hitomi (December 2, 2022b). 「プロローグ」愛蔵版ブック [Prologue – collector's edition book] (in Japanese). Shibuya, Tokyo: Axel Entermedia Co., Ltd. ID 3475.

=== Works cited ===
- Murao, Tatsuya (May 11, 2024). 無良崇人「進化するアスリート」 [Takahito Mura: 'The evolving athlete']. Quadruple Axel (2024 Yuzuru Hanyu special) (in Japanese). Chiyoda, Tokyo: Yamakei Publishing Co., Ltd. pp. 52–55. ISBN 978-4635907859.
- Rizzacasa d'Orsogna, Costanza (February 3, 2026). Yuzuru – Il volo del samurai [Yuzuru – The flight of the samurai] (in Italian). Florence: Giunti Editore. ISBN 979-1223204863.
- Russell, Susan D. (September 6, 2022). "Yuzuru Hanyu – An icon leaves the competitive stage". International Figure Skating. Denville Township, New Jersey. pp. 22–33. IFSISS22-05.
- SKY Perfect (January 24, 2023). 羽生結弦 Hanew World「羽生結弦アイスショー プロローグ in Hachinohe」 [Yuzuru Hanyu Hanew World: Yuzuru Hanyu's ice show Prologue in Hachinohe]. SKY Perfect TV Guide (in Japanese). Chūō, Tokyo: Tokyo News Agency. Archived from the original on January 20, 2023.
