= ESPN World Fame 100 =

Ranking of global sportspeople

ESPN World Fame 100 is an annual list compiled and published by ESPN magazine since 2016. The rankings were made based on salary and endorsements with their social media following Facebook, Twitter and Instagram along with Google search popularity to create a comparative ranking system.

The Portuguese footballer Cristiano Ronaldo topped the list each year since its inception. The last update was published in 2019.

== 2016 ==
| Rank | Athlete | Sport |
|---|---|---|
| 1 | (Portugal) Cristiano Ronaldo | Association football |
| 2 | (United States) LeBron James | Basketball |
| 3 | (Argentina) Lionel Messi | Association football |
| 4 | (Brazil) Neymar | Association football |
| 5 | (Switzerland) Roger Federer | Tennis |
| 6 | (United States) Kevin Durant | Basketball |
| 7 | (United States) Tiger Woods | Golf |
| 8 | (India) Virat Kohli | Cricket |
| 9 | (Colombia) James Rodriguez | Association football |
| 10 | (Spain) Rafael Nadal | Tennis |

== 2017 ==
| Rank | Athlete | Sport |
|---|---|---|
| 1 | (Portugal) Cristiano Ronaldo | Association football |
| 2 | (United States) LeBron James | Basketball |
| 3 | (Argentina) Lionel Messi | Association football |
| 4 | (Switzerland) Roger Federer | Tennis |
| 5 | (United States) Phil Mickelson | Golf |
| 6 | (Brazil) Neymar | Association football |
| 7 | (Jamaica) Usain Bolt | Track and Field |
| 8 | (United States) Kevin Durant | Basketball |
| 9 | (Spain) Rafael Nadal | Tennis |
| 10 | (United States) Tiger Woods | Golf |

== 2018 ==
| Rank | Athlete | Sport |
|---|---|---|
| 1 | (Portugal) Cristiano Ronaldo | Association football |
| 2 | (United States) LeBron James | Basketball |
| 3 | (Argentina) Lionel Messi | Association football |
| 4 | (Brazil) Neymar | Association football |
| 5 | (Switzerland) Roger Federer | Tennis |
| 6 | (United States) Tiger Woods | Golf |
| 7 | (United States) Kevin Durant | Basketball |
| 8 | (Spain) Rafael Nadal | Tennis |
| 9 | (United States) Stephen Curry | Basketball |
| 10 | (United States) Phil Mickelson | Golf |

== 2019 ==
| Rank | Athlete | Sport |
|---|---|---|
| 1 | (Portugal) Cristiano Ronaldo | Association football |
| 2 | (United States) LeBron James | Basketball |
| 3 | (Argentina) Lionel Messi | Association football |
| 4 | (Brazil) Neymar | Association football |
| 5 | (Republic of Ireland) Conor McGregor | MMA |
| 6 | (Switzerland) Roger Federer | Tennis |
| 7 | (India) Virat Kohli | Cricket |
| 8 | (Spain) Rafael Nadal | Tennis |
| 9 | (United States) Stephen Curry | Basketball |
| 10 | (United States) Tiger Woods | Golf |
