= Realive (ice show) =

2026 ice show in Japan

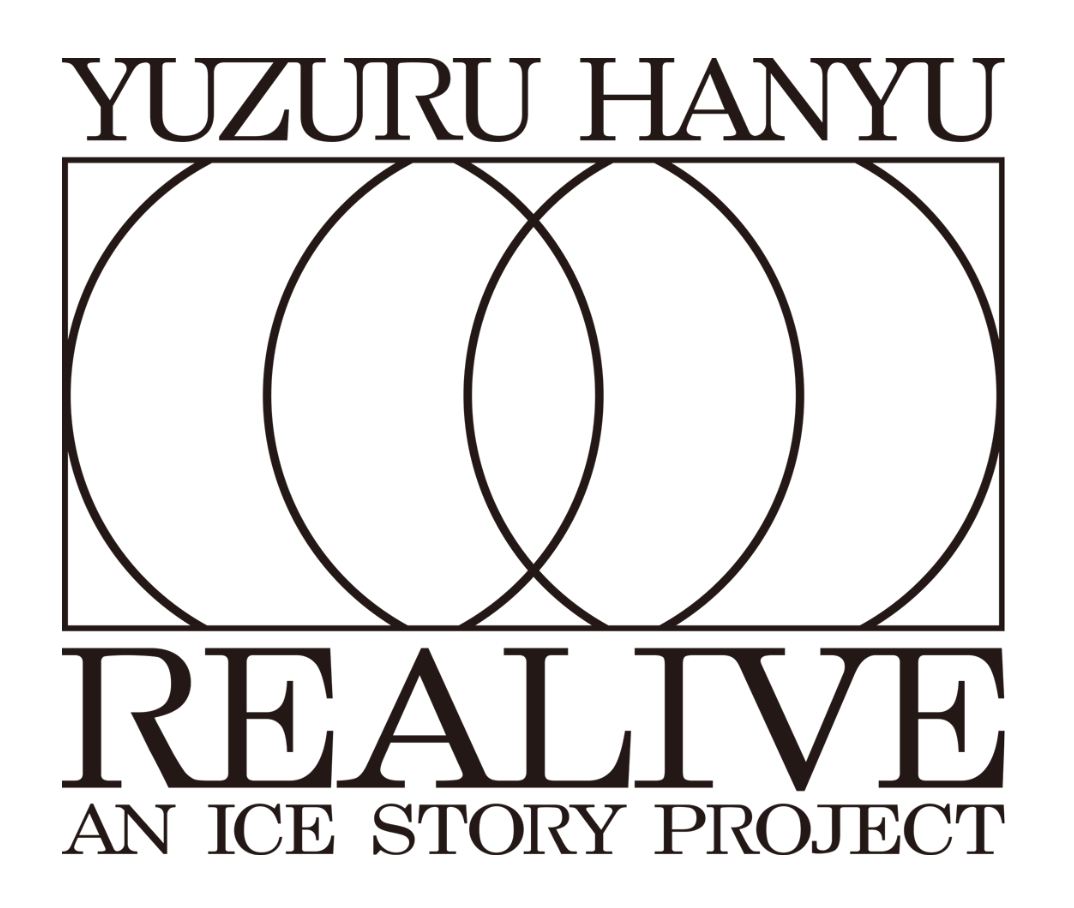
- Ice show type: Solo show
- Format: Figure skating performances and video segments
- Theme: Growth of skating programs as "living beings"
- Duration: 80 min
- Start date: April 11, 2026
- End date: November 29, 2026
- No. of shows: 4
- Country: Japan
- Venue: Sekisui Heim Super Arena; Saga Arena
- Attendance: 14,000 (as of April 2026)
- Cinema live viewing: Hong Kong; Japan; Macao; Singapore; Taiwan
- Streaming: Telasa; Beyond Live
- Broadcast: TV Asahi
- Producer: Yuzuru Hanyu (performer)
- Director: Mikiko
- Organizer: Team Sirius; CIC; TV Asahi; KHB; KBC
- Sponsor: Towa Pharmaceutical; Phiten; Ponta Pass (KDDI)
- Website: realive-icestory.jp

Yuzuru Hanyu article series
- Skating career: Olympic seasons; Career achievements; Figure skating programs
- Other works: Bibliography
- Solo ice shows: Prologue; Gift; Repray Tour; Echoes of Life Tour; Realive
- Ensemble ice shows: Fantasy on Ice; Continues with Wings; Yuzuru Hanyu Notte Stellata

Realive (full title stylized as 'Yuzuru Hanyu REALIVE an ICE STORY project') was a solo ice show by Japanese figure skater and two-time consecutive Olympic champion Yuzuru Hanyu in 2026, organized by his management company Team Sirius in partnership with CIC, TV Asahi, and the local broadcasting network KHB. The show was part of the celebration events on the occasion of KHB's 50th anniversary and was held at Sekisui Heim Super Arena in Rifu near Hanyu's hometown of Sendai on April 11–12.

Realive was based on the first three main installments of the Yuzuru Hanyu Ice Story, a series of solo shows produced and directed by Hanyu himself in collaboration with Japanese choreographer Mikiko, and served as a prequel for the upcoming fourth Ice Story titled White. Each performance had a net duration of 80 minutes and featured seven selected programs from previous Ice Stories in the first half, including a reprise of Hanyu's competitive short program "Otoñal", which scored back-to-back world records in the 2018–19 season. The second half consisted of a 20-minute-long skating medley named Prequel: Before the White, composed by Japan Academy Film Prize-winner Marihiko Hara exclusively for the show. It marked the first time that Hanyu performed a complete half of a show on his own without leaving the ice rink.

Realive was sold out by lottery with a total of 14,000 spectators in attendance (Note: According to KHB, the estimated number of visitors at the main venue across two days was 15,000.) and the first day being broadcast live on the Japanese subscription channel CS TV Asahi. The second day of the show was screened live at movie theaters nationwide and delayed overseas on April 14, 2026. In addition, it was streamed live on Telasa in Japan and Beyond Live worldwide. Upon the conclusion of Realive, the Ice Story series has become the first solo ice show production to exceed 200,000 spectators in total. (Note: The number refers to spectators at the main performance venues only. It does not include live viewing at cinemas, streaming services, or television broadcasts.) Following the success of the Miyagi event, two more performances were announced to be held on November 28–29, 2026, at Saga Arena in Saga City.

== Background ==
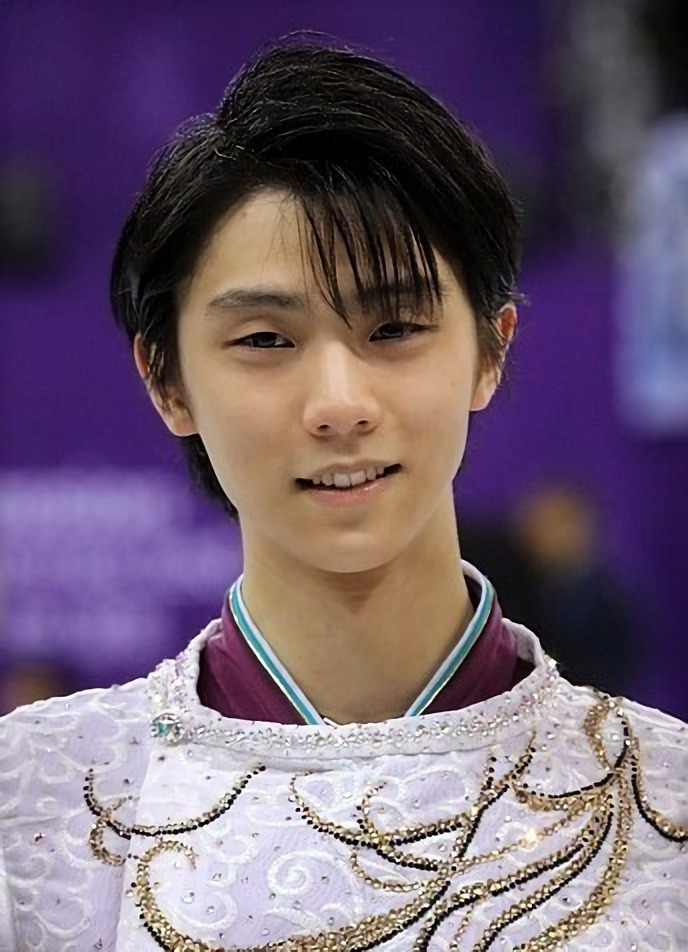
Yuzuru Hanyu at the 2018 Winter Olympics

Yuzuru Hanyu is a Japanese figure skater and ice show producer who competed in the men's singles discipline and turned professional in 2022. Regarded as one of the greatest skaters in the sport's history, he is the first two-time Olympic men's champion in 66 years with back-to-back gold medals at the 2014 and 2018 Winter Olympics, and the first male single skater to complete the Super Slam, having won all major international senior and junior titles in the course of his career.

His first major work as a professional skater is the ongoing Yuzuru Hanyu Ice Story, a series of solo ice shows produced by himself and directed by renowned Japanese choreographer Mikiko, who is internationally known for her collaboration with the J-pop trio Perfume and her involvement in the Tokyo handover segment at the 2016 Summer Olympics closing ceremony among others. Until Realive, the Ice Story series consisted of an introductory show titled Prologue (2022), the first solo ice show production in the history of figure skating, followed by three main installments with Gift (2023), the Repray Tour (2023–24) and the Echoes of Life Tour (2024–25). Each show featured 8 to 15 skating programs that were merged into a cohesive, sophisticated story supported with video narration by Hanyu on screen. The Ice Story series has been a huge commercial success, with all live performances being sold out by lottery and more than 180,000 spectators in attendance, as of February 2025.

== Show dates and venue ==
Locations of Realive

Realive was held on April 11 and 12, 2026, at Sekisui Heim Super Arena in Rifu, Miyagi, near Hanyu's hometown of Sendai. The venue served as the final stop of the Repray Tour in April 2024 and is home to the annual ensemble ice show Yuzuru Hanyu Notte Stellata, a commemoration event of the 2011 Tohoku earthquake and tsunami, the most powerful earthquake recorded in Japan, which cost more than 19,000 people's lives. The disaster has fundamentally shaped Hanyu's life and career, having experienced the 9.1-magnitude earthquake and following blackout in his hometown at 16 years old.

The Sekisui Heim Super Arena has a maximum capacity of 7,800 seats. Compared to the Repray Tour, where the number of seats had to be reduced to 5,800 due to the limited viewing angles at the installed video screen, the venue capacity at Realive was nearly maxed out with 7,000 available seats and standing views.

Following the success of the Miyagi event, two more performances were announced to be held on November 28 and 29, 2026, at Saga Arena in Saga City, which is located on the Japanese island Kyushu. The venue also hosted the second stop of the Repray Tour in January 2024 with a seating capacity of 5,500.

Chronological list of show dates and venues of Realive
| Date | Venue | Location | Seat. capacity | Max. capacity | Image | Ref. |
|---|---|---|---|---|---|---|
| Apr 11–12, 2026 | Sekisui Heim Super Arena | Rifu (Miyagi) | 7,000 | 7,063 | Outdoor view of Sekisui Heim Super Arena | |
| Nov 28–29, 2026 | Saga Arena | Saga City (Saga) | TBA | 8,400 | Outdoor view of Saga Arena | |

== Promotion and ticket sales ==
Realive was officially announced on January 11, 2026, at 11:11 local time, confirming Hanyu as the executive producer and Mikiko as the director of the two-day event. The performance was revealed to feature a selection of programs from the Ice Story series, focusing on their development and growth throughout the years with Hanyu carefully referring to them as "living beings".

Compared to previous installments of the Ice Story series, Realive was primarily covered by domestic media with little promotion overseas. However, the show was highly anticipated among fans, as it was Hanyu's first solo performance since the conclusion of the Echoes of Life Tour in February 2025. The same year on August 15, the Japanese figure skating star announced to take a maintenance break in order to recover his body from physical overstrain and develop his skills in various areas, such as contemporary dance.

Ticket sales were handled by the show's official organizer TV Asahi and staggered into multiple application rounds, with the pre-sales periods having started about two months prior to the event. All tickets were sold by lottery, with prices ranging from ¥18,000 for designated standing views to ¥30,000 for premier seats (US$113–188 as of April 2026). At the Saga event, special group tickets for four people were available for ¥80,000 (US$520 as of September 2026).

== Production ==
Realive was produced by Hanyu himself, who was responsible for the global conception as well as the story writing, selection of music, skating programs, costumes, video footage and more. As in all previous installments of the Ice Story series, he received professional guidance and support by Mikiko, who served as a director for the show.

The event was organized by Hanyu's private management company Team Sirius in partnership with TV Asahi, Japan's most viewed television network for three consecutive years between 2022 and 2024, and CIC, an event organization company that has successfully produced a variety of ice shows, such as Fantasy on Ice or Dreams on Ice. The show was part of the celebration events held on the 50th anniversary of KHB, a local broadcasting network based in Miyagi Prefecture. The Saga event received special support by the broadcasting station KBC with headquarters in Fukuoka City on Kyushu. Realive was sponsored by Towa Pharmaceutical, the sports and body care company Phiten, and the subscription service Ponta Pass launched by the telecommunications operator KDDI.

=== Conception and making ===
The conception and structure of Realive was comparable to the introductory solo ice show Prologue, produced by Hanyu in 2022. Both performances opened with reprises of past skating programs and featured a new work in the second half of the show. The debuted programs served as teasers for the succeeding solo productions Gift and White, which were already in the making by the time of their official announcements at Prologue and Realive, respectively. While the three main Ice Stories gave the impression of elaborate blockbuster movies with a cohesive story narrated by Hanyu on screen, the video segments in Realive were shorter in length and more abstract in design, relying stronger on visuals and music instead of spoken text passages. As in previous Ice Story productions, the video edits were created by the Japanese media corporation Geek Pictures.

Each show lasted 80 minutes and featured seven selected programs from previous Ice Stories in the first half and a 20-minute-long medley in the second half, which added up to 44 minutes of net skating time. The resulting short breaks of 2–5 minutes between two programs required Hanyu to adjust both his costumes and backstage routines. While one-piece clothes are generally more suitable for skating, particularly during the execution of jumps and spins, Hanyu had to detach the top from two of his outfits in order to keep his pants and skating boots on while changing costumes.

=== Music, programs, and costumes ===
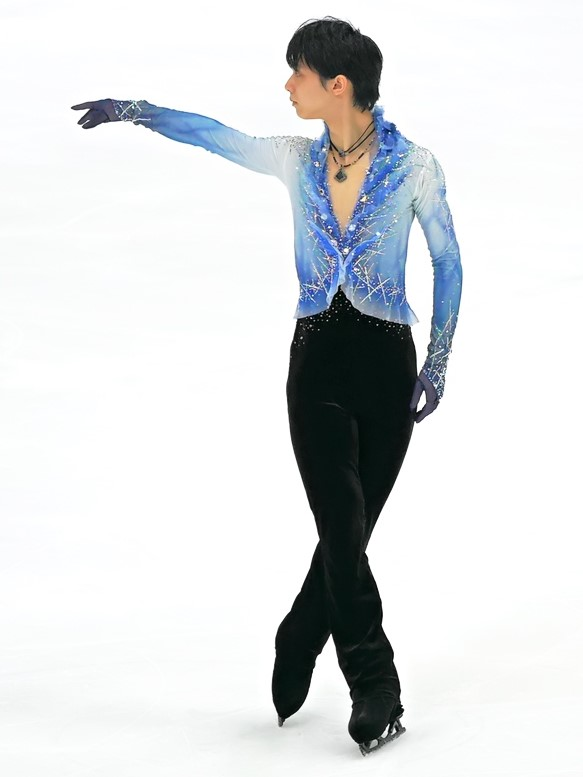
Hanyu performing his short program "Otoñal" at the 2018 Grand Prix of Helsinki

The music selection for Realive covered a wide range of genres, including piano pieces, J-pop, rap, contemporary music, film and video game soundtracks. As in previous productions, Japanese sound designer Keiichi Yano was in charge of the music direction. The first half of the show featured two programs from each of the first three Ice Stories as well as a shortened version of Hanyu's Olympic-winning free skate program Seimei, which he notably challenged at Prologue in 2022. Three of the selected programs were choreographed by Canadian skaters Jeffrey Buttle, Shae-Lynn Bourne, and David Wilson, who created the majority of Hanyu's competitive short, free, and exhibition programs, respectively. The other choreographies were developed by Hanyu himself, some of them in collaboration with Mikiko and Emi Tamura, member of the dance group Elevenplay.

The medley Prequel: Before the White, presented in the second half, consisted of ten distinct music pieces and was composed by Japan Academy Film Prize-winner Marihiko Hara exclusively for the show. Hara gained international acclaim for his music used in the show act "Moment of remembrance" at the 2021 Tokyo Olympics opening ceremony as well as his award-winning soundtrack and theme song for the movie Kokuho (lit. 'National Treasure') in 2026. Initially, he was asked to compose one or two pieces for Realive, however, after his introduction to Hanyu's show concept, he expressed his appreciation and insisted on creating the soundtrack for the entire second half.

At Realive, Hanyu presented seven different costumes, of which two were newly created by Takeru Sakai and Toko Matsumoto. It was their first collaboration with Hanyu and venture into fashion design for figure skating. Two costumes were reused from the Echoes of Life Tour, made by Toshihiko Sakurai in 2024. The other three outfits were designed by Satomi Ito, who created the majority of Hanyu's figure skating costumes in the course of his career. The oldest piece used at Realive dated from the 2018–19 season and was originally made for his short program to the piano piece "Otoñal" by Raúl di Blasio.

=== Ice rink, installations, and technology ===
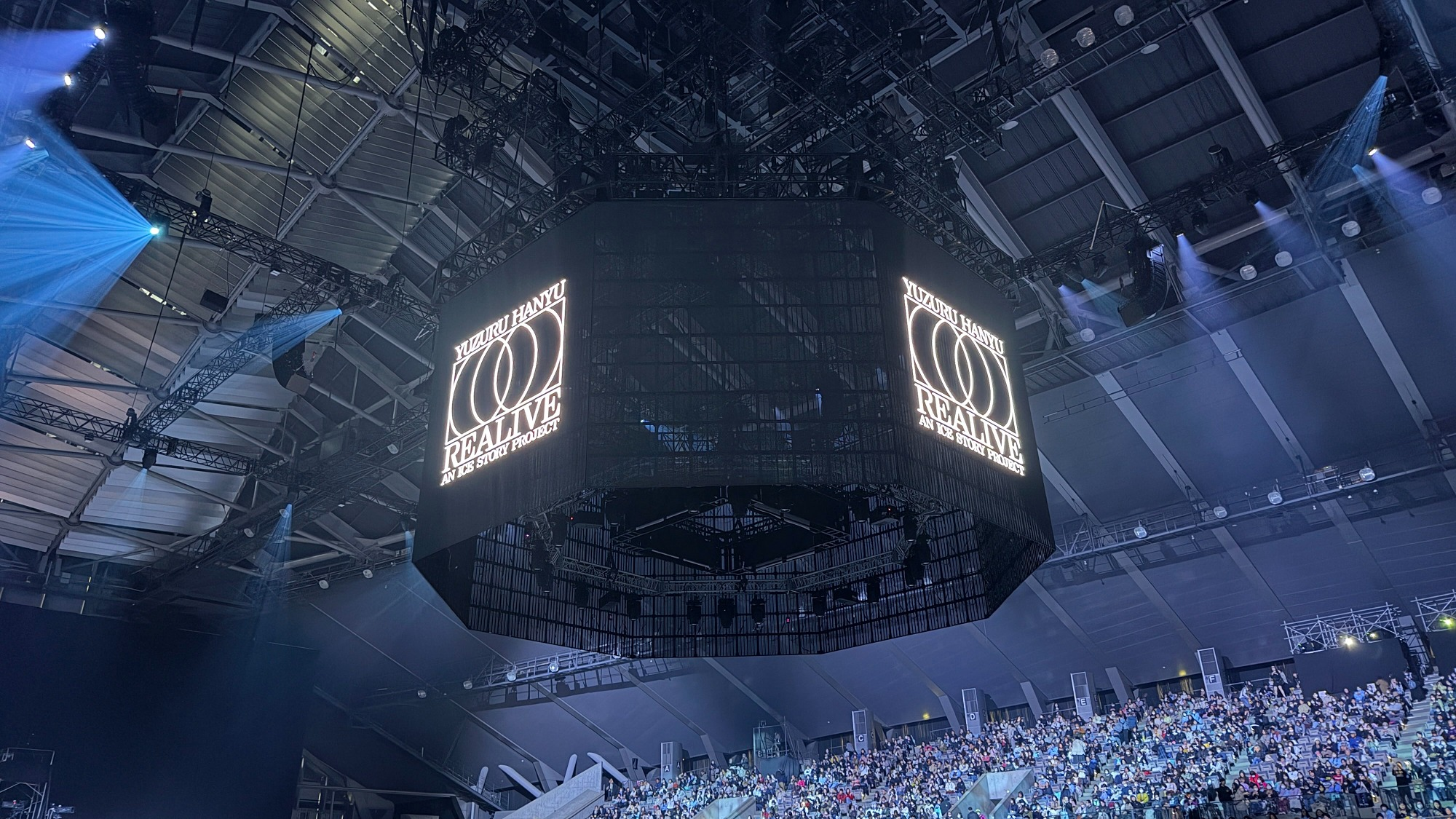
Octagonal LED-video screen installed on the arena ceiling

As the Sekisui Heim Super Arena was not fitted with a permanent ice rink, it was necessary to set up a mobile rink, provided by the Tokyo-based company Patine Leisure. For the first time at a solo ice show, the main video screen was not installed on the short side of the rink but attached to the center of the ceiling. This new setting made it possible for spectators to sit on all four sides of the rink and to max out the venue's seating capacity. The installed LED-screen was octagonal in shape, so that the played video segments were visible and undistorted from all viewing angles in the arena. The screen was designed as a unique, transparent grid that could be moved up and down, creating the impression of a rising and sinking cage. This feature was notably utilized during the medley Prequel: Before the White in the second half of the show. Like in all previous Ice Story productions, Hanyu's skating performances were visually enhanced by elaborate laser lighting and projection mapping technology.

== Show synopsis ==
Each show had a net duration of 80 minutes, which is about half the length of larger touring ice shows like Stars on Ice or Fantasy on Ice. Despite the shortened performance time, each show had an intermission of 30 minutes for ice resurfacing. In terms of content, the first half of Realive was a reprise of selected programs from the first three Ice Stories, while the second half was designed as a prequel for the upcoming fourth installment White. Unlike previous Ice Story productions, the show did not feature a six-minute warm-up session or closing encore performance.

=== First half: Realive ===
External videos
- on Hanyu's official channel
- Mass Destruction: Reload at the Echoes of Life Tour
- Gate of Living at the Repray Tour

The show opened with a remix of original soundtracks from the first three Ice Stories, accompanied by spectacular projections and laser lights, and culminated in a countdown on the main screen from 5 to 1. Hanyu entered the ice rink and performed an intricate skating sequence in silence, followed by a reprise of "Megalovania" from the video game Undertale by Toby Fox, which he debuted at the Repray Tour in 2023. After he left the rink for a costume change, a record player and vinyl record with the label "Yuzuru Hanyu Archives" appeared on screen, playing another music remix with video footage from the previous Ice Stories. In less than two minutes, Hanyu returned to the ice and reprised his dance program to the song "Mass Destruction: Reload" by Lotus Juice from the video game Persona 3 Reload, which made its first appearance at the Echoes of Life Tour in 2024.

The following video segment showed a compilation of numerical statistics and English newspaper headlines from Hanyu's competitive career, set to an audio edit of his most memorable interviews. The career flashback stopped at the 2019 Skate Canada International, with Hanyu's score results and the title of his short program "Otoñal" appearing on screen. At that event, he achieved his personal best total score of 322.59 points after the change of the ISU Judging System in 2018. Wearing the original costume from the 2018–19 season, Hanyu performed the program in full length for the first time in seven years. The music piece was also played during his first Ice Story Gift in 2023; however, he did not have the opportunity to skate to it live at the venue, so he decided to bring the program back for Realive.

The show continued with a humorous, self-ironic remake of the video segments played at the Repray Tour, showing a small 8-bit version of Hanyu walking around in a virtual world. The segment culminated in a reprise of his program to the song "Gate of Living" by Ringo Sheena. Compared to the Repray Tour, Hanyu replaced the dance part that was originally performed on a separate mobile stage with a new choreography on the ice. While Hanyu left the rink for another costume change, a chronological recap of his first four seasons as a professional skater was shown on screen, starting off on "day 0", the official announcement of the conclusion of his competitive career on July 19, 2022. Then a counter moved from 0 to 222, the premiere of his first Ice Story Gift at Tokyo Dome on February 26, 2023, visually accompanied by original footage from the show. The recap continued with stops on day 473 and 872, showing scenes from the opening performances of the Repray Tour and Echoes of Life Tour, respectively. The counter eventually came to a halt at 1362, marking the first day of Realive on April 11, 2026. Amidst circular water waves projected onto the ice surface, Hanyu re-entered the rink and gave an ethereal skating performance to Joe Hisaishi's music piece "One Summer's Day" from the Ghibli movie Spirited Away. The program was first presented at Gift in 2023 and later brought back for Stars on Ice 2023 and the Repray Tour.

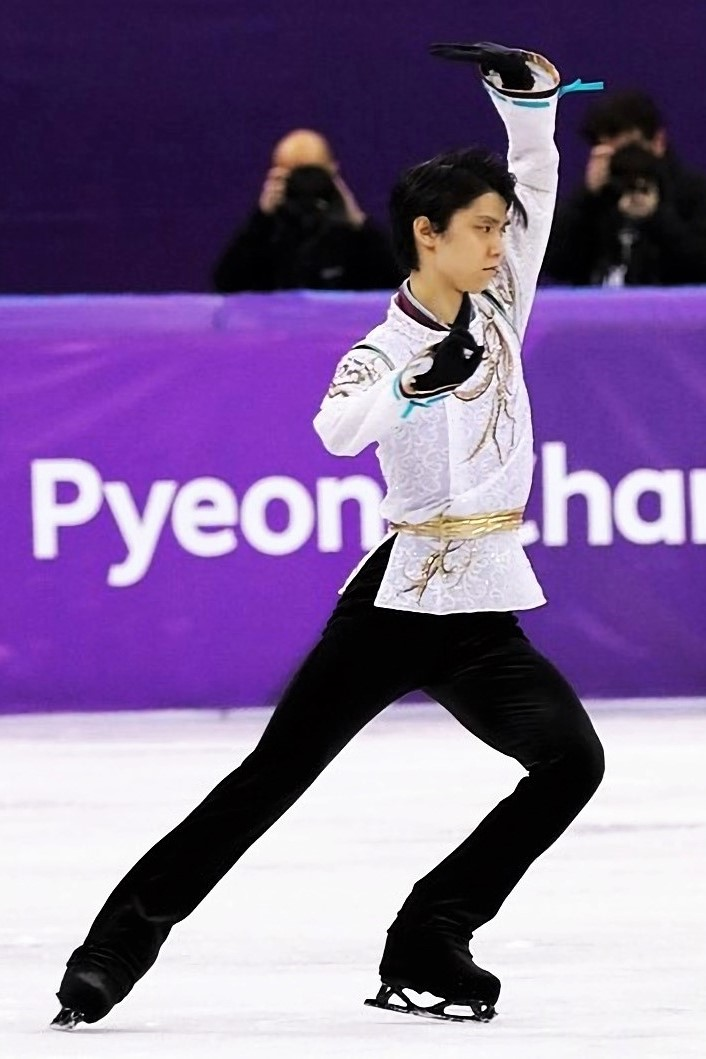
Hanyu's signature Seimei program, performed in each show of the Ice Story series

The final part of the first half opened with a backstage documentary about the making of Realive and Hanyu's preparations at his home rink in Sendai. After the video segment, he performed to the song "Utai IV: Reawakening" by Kenji Kawai from the science fiction thriller Ghost in the Shell, which made its program debut at Echoes of Life in 2024. Hanyu skated in a long, golden costume of unusually heavy fabric, giving the impression of a "ceremonial and mysterious" appearance. The image of an oppressive, dystopian scenery was visually enhanced by large black stains projected onto the ice. Without leaving the rink, Hanyu gave a surprise performance of his signature free skate program Seimei to Shigeru Umebayashi's original soundtrack from the movies Onmyoji I and II. Still dressed in his golden costume, he reprised the choreographic sequence and final spin of the program like he did in all closing encore performances of previous Ice Stories. The first half concluded with an unusually early bowing and scream of gratitude by Hanyu, indicating that Realive had come to an end and a new act would be awaiting the audience after the intermission.

=== Second half: Prequel ===
External videos
- on Hanyu's official channel
- Prequel: Before the White at Realive (digest)

In the second half of the show, Hanyu performed the medley Prequel: Before the White, composed by Marihiko Hara. He appeared on the ice in a long, all-white costume covered by a translucent black robe, and was sitting in the middle of the rink. The large octagonal screen came down to cage him, while showing an animation of a toddler sitting in a cosmic space. The opening act was set to the soundtrack named "A quiet chaos" and was presented primarily in monochrome lighting. When the screen moved up, Hanyu started running around the rink, making his first steps on the ice. At the same time, a cracked celestial body appeared on the screen, and the toddler grew up to a small child. The first segment concluded with Hanyu spinning in a vortex of magenta, yellow, and cyan blue—the three primary colors in subtractive mixing. Illuminated by warm spotlight, he skated to the soothing music of the second piece titled "Before the White", while the child on screen awakened and started walking. Mid performance, Hanyu was moving back and forth along a projected straight line that divided the rink into black and white halves, resembling a moonwalk in slow-motion. At the end of the segment, the medley title Prequel: Before the White appeared on screen and was projected onto the ice surface.

In the third act titled "Magenta Paradox", five black squares of different sizes with a white outline were mapped onto the ice. Hanyu performed a short dance in each, with their colors successively changing from black to magenta. He then lay down below the screen, which now showed the small, blue-haired child walking through a vast landscape and remote forest, set to the piano piece "Realive Interlude". Along the way, he met a crystal-shaped figure named "kaku". The two characters continued their journey together, while the small child gradually discovered the different colors of the world. As the lighting changed from magenta to yellow, Hanyu got up from the ice and skated to the piece "Tiny yellow", moving within a circular space created by yellow rays of light that were projected from the screen onto the rink. In the attendant video footage, the previously bare trees had transformed into a forest with lush greenery. Towards the end of the performance, the scenery gradually shifted from land to water, with the lighting changing from yellow to cyan blue. Hanyu disappeared behind the descending screen, which now showed the two animated characters swimming underwater. Accompanied by the music piece "Awaking", the small child walked on a narrow path, while the crystal character kaku led the way and hopped up a stairway made of ice. The video segment concluded with the gathering of dark clouds and the two companions emerging from the water.

The penultimate act, titled "Still in Motion", opened with Hanyu standing in the middle of the rink, surrounded by multiple long stripes of white fabric, hanging down from the main screen above. During his skating performance, he successively pulled the stripes apart, creating the visual impression of a wind-like network. The symbolic entering through a Torii gate, which marks the transition from the mundane to the spiritual world in Shinto religion, further added to the sacred atmosphere of the scene. In the final video segment, the small child and the crystal figure kaku were reunited in a calm place of light blue. When the child touched kaku for the first time, the screen slowly turned white and eventually black, with snow starting to fall onto the ice. Hanyu stood in the center of the rink, looking up and spreading his arms amidst the silent snowfall, then he skated the last act of Prequel to the music piece "Chroma". During his performance, the video footage showed the crystal figure being shattered into pieces in outer space, leaving the small child all alone again. Followed by a single blue spotlight, Hanyu now skated in the dark, only him and his shadows being visible to the audience. At the end of the performance, the rink was illuminated in blinding white light, while Hanyu slowly glided backward and left the rink as if he were falling backwards.

The Prequel part concluded with the show's ending credits, set to the music piece "Hiss Coda". The following video segment showed the small child falling through the cracks of a damaged sphere in outer space. When he reached the ground, an all-white museum appeared in front of him, and the title of the fourth Ice Story White was revealed on screen. It was the only video footage accompanied by Hanyu's narration voice in the second half of the show. After the announcement of his next solo production, Hanyu returned to the ice for a personal message to the audience and a farewell round to the closing act of Hara's ten-piece composition named "Curtain Call".

== Athletic merit and records ==
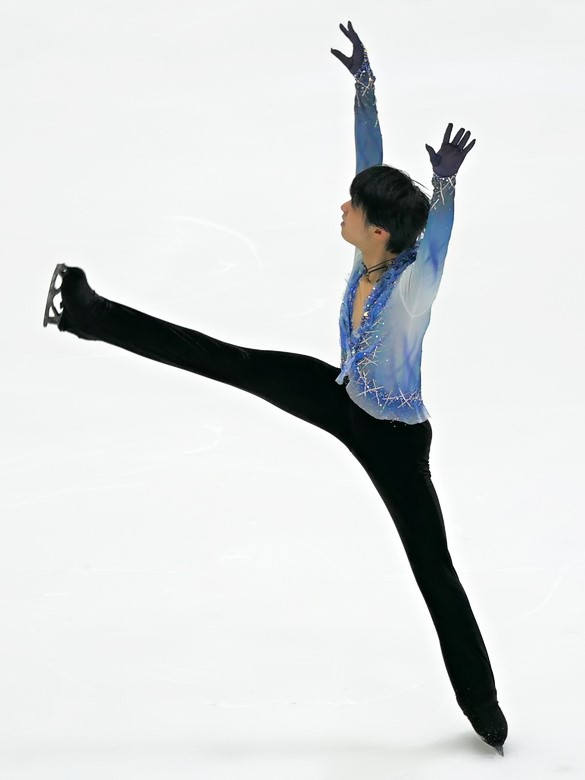
Hanyu scoring a world record with "Otoñal" at the 2018 Grand Prix of Helsinki

Realive was the first solo ice show production in figure skating where the live skating performances made up more than half of the net event duration. Compared to Prologue and the first three Ice Stories, where the recovery time between two programs was bridged with longer narration segments on screen or interactive talk rounds with the audience, Realive was constructed as a skating-packed show with short breaks of few minutes in the first half and a continuous 20-minute-long program medley in the second half. Hanyu's new Prequel-medley was the longest program he has ever performed, with a duration twice as long as his Piano Collection presented at the Echoes of Life Tour in 2024–25. It also marked the first time that he skated a complete half of a show on his own without leaving the ice rink.

The high density of presented programs required Hanyu to further improve his physical endurance and reduce the number of difficult or energy-consuming elements compared to previous solo shows. The greatest athletic challenge was the reprise of his former short program "Otoñal", which scored back-to-back world records in the 2018–19 season. Compared to the initial version presented in competition, the two quadruple jumps were replaced by triples, while the spins, step sequence, and choreography remained unchanged. In his performance at Realive, Hanyu also executed a triple Axel jump, which is rarely attempted by women and challenging for men due to its unique forward take-off and three and a half revolutions in the air. His opening program "Megalovania" notably featured a high variety of spins and twizzle turns, which are considered the technically most difficult elements in ice dance.

== Attendance and distribution ==
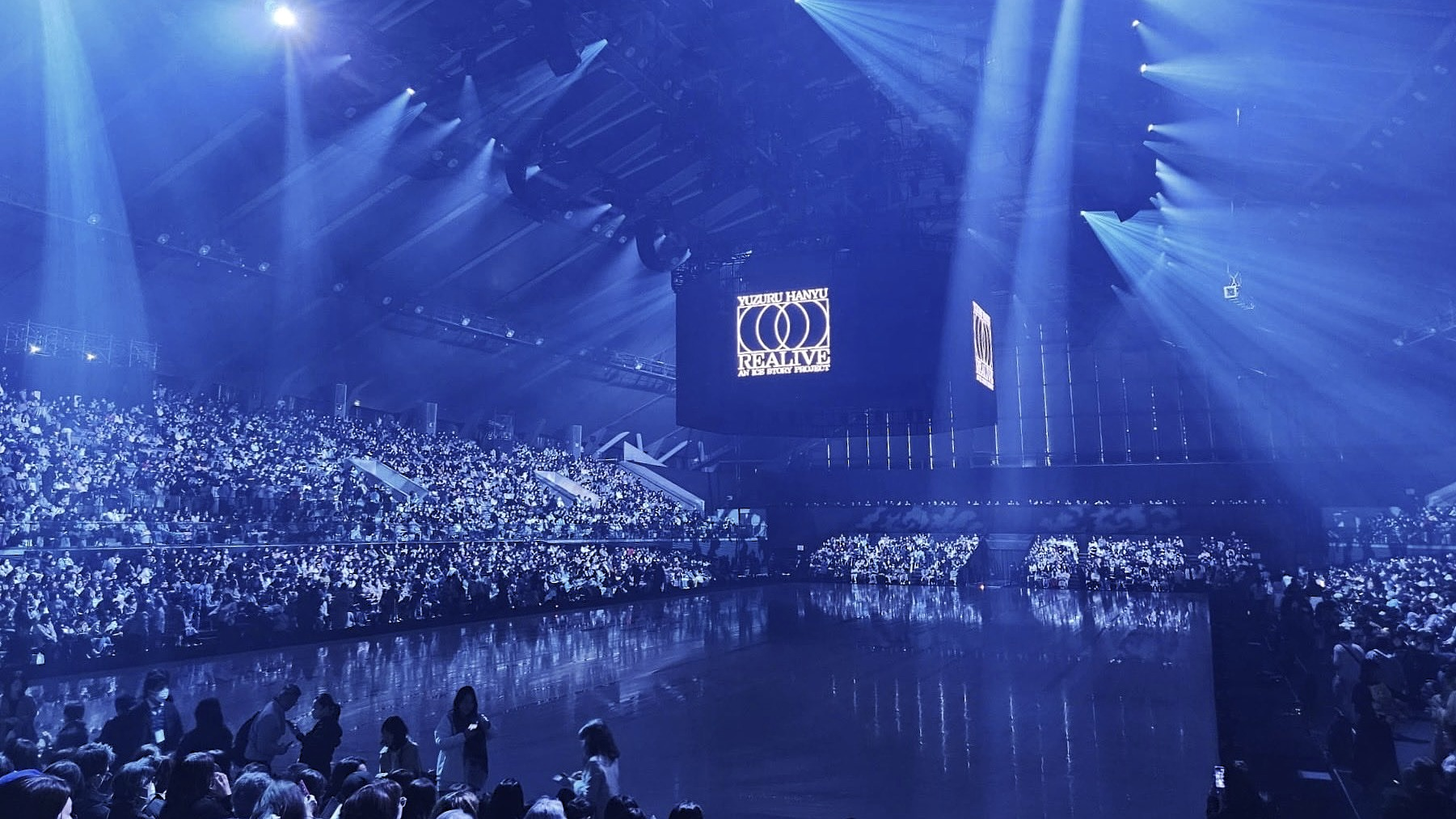
Audience view on the first day of Realive at Sekisui Heim Super Arena

Realive was sold out with a live audience of 7,000 spectators on each day and a total of 14,000 people in attendance. According to KHB, the estimated number of visitors at the main venue was approximately 15,000. The first day was broadcast live exclusively on the Japanese subscription channel CS TV Asahi. The second performance was screened live at 81 movie theaters nationwide and delayed on April 14, 2026, at 78 cinemas in Japan as well as Hong Kong, Macao, Singapore, and Taiwan. The second day was also streamed live on Telasa in Japan and Beyond Live worldwide.

Upon the conclusion of Realive, the 23 live shows of Hanyu's Ice Story series, including the introductory event Prologue, have been attended by more than 200,000 spectators in total, making it the first solo ice show production in figure skating to reach that milestone.

On July 19, 2026, which marked the fourth anniversary of Hanyu's professional skating career, a full recording of the medley Prequel: Before the White was uploaded to his official YouTube-channel and freely accessible for one week.

- Attendance numbers do not include cinema live viewing events.
- Broadcast dates refer to the premiere on the subscription channel CS TV Asahi.

Chronological list of show dates, attendance, and broadcasting
| Date | Location | Attendance | Cinema | Broadcast premiere | Ref. |
|---|---|---|---|---|---|
| Apr 11, 2026 | Rifu (Miyagi) | 7,000 | — | Live | |
| Apr 12, 2026 | Rifu (Miyagi) | 7,000 | Live (Japan); Apr 14, 2026 (Japan and overseas) | TBD | |
| Nov 28, 2026 | Saga City (Saga) | TBA | TBA | TBA | |
| Nov 29, 2026 | Saga City (Saga) | TBA | TBA | TBA | |
| Total | | 14,000 | | | |

== Set list ==
First half

1. "Megalovania"
  (from Undertale by Toby Fox)
2. "Mass Destruction: Reload"
  (from Persona 3 Reload by Lotus Juice)
3. "Otoñal"
  (by Raúl di Blasio)
4. "Gate of Living"
  (by Ringo Sheena)
5. "One Summer's Day"
  (from Spirited Away by Joe Hisaishi)
6. "Utai IV: Reawakening"
  (from Ghost in the Shell by Kenji Kawai)
7. Seimei
  (from Onmyoji I and II by Shigeru Umebayashi; choreo sequence)

Second half

8. Prequel: Before the White
  (by Marihiko Hara)
  1. "A Quiet Chaos" (video)
  2. "Before the White"
  3. "Magenta Paradox"
  4. Realive Interlude (video)
  5. "Tiny Yellow"
  6. "Awakening" (video)
  7. "Still in Motion"
  8. "Chroma"
  9. "Hiss Coda" (ending credits)
  10. "Curtain Call"

== Notes and references ==
=== Official guide and documentary books ===
- Hasegawa, Hitomi (2026a). REALIVE – official pamphlet (in Japanese). Minato, Tokyo: Bunka Kobo Inc. Archived from the original on April 1, 2026.
- Hasegawa, Hitomi (2026). PREQUEL before the WHITE – official pamphlet (in Japanese). Minato, Tokyo: Bunka Kobo Inc. Archived from the original on April 1, 2026.

=== Works cited ===
- Russell, Susan D. (September 6, 2022). "Yuzuru Hanyu – An icon leaves the competitive stage". International Figure Skating. Denville Township, New Jersey. pp. 22–33. IFSISS22-05.
- Soen editorial (January 28, 2026). 羽生結弦「Echoes of Life」衣装、革新のバックステージ [Yuzuru Hanyu 'Echoes of Life': Costumes, innovations backstage]. Soen (in Japanese). Shibuya, Tokyo: Bunka Publishing Bureau. pp. 18–25.
