= List of figure skating programs of Yuzuru Hanyu =

Two-time Olympic champion in men's figure skating

Yuzuru Hanyu
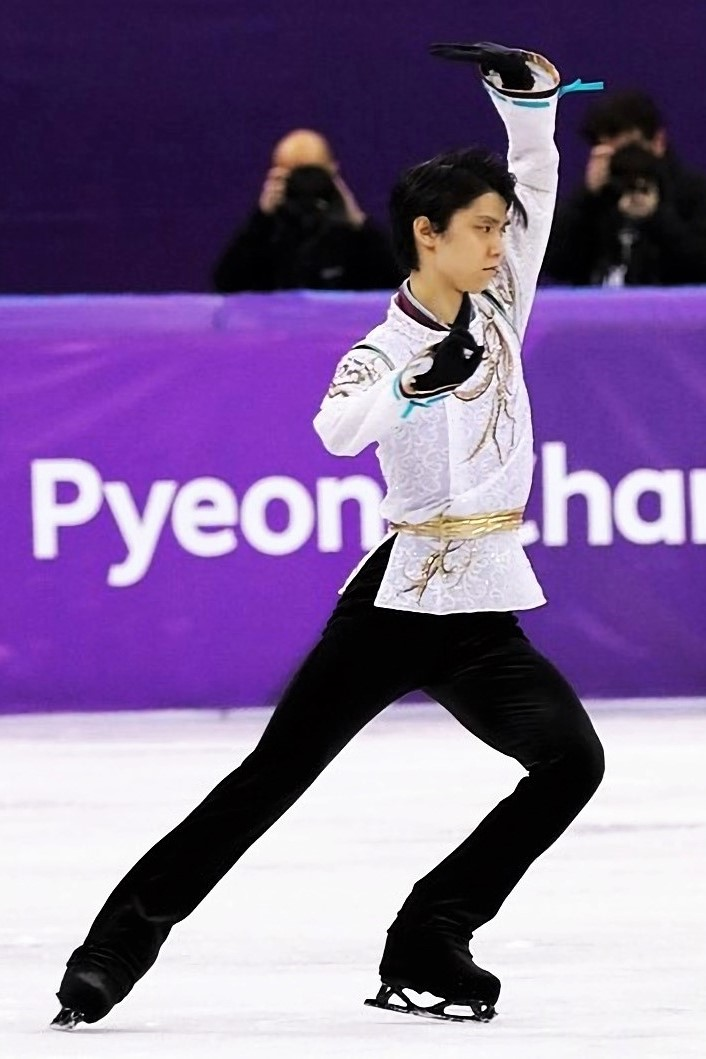
- Hanyu in his winning free skate program Seimei at the 2018 Winter Olympics

Yuzuru Hanyu article series
- Skating career: Olympic seasons; Career achievements; Figure skating programs
- Other works: Bibliography
- Solo ice shows: Prologue; Gift; Repray Tour; Echoes of Life Tour; Realive
- Ensemble ice shows: Fantasy on Ice; Continues with Wings; Yuzuru Hanyu Notte Stellata

Japanese figure skater and ice show producer Yuzuru Hanyu has presented more than 60 different skating programs in the course of his career, among them 26 competition programs which earned him back-to-back Olympic titles in 2014 and 2018, the first Super Slam in the men's singles discipline, and 19 world records among other achievements. Having experienced the 2011 Tōhoku earthquake and tsunami in his hometown of Sendai, also known as 3.11, Hanyu has dedicated various performances to the victims of the disaster. Notable are his three gala exhibitions at the Winter Olympics as well as his tributes presented at Nippon TV's annual charity show 24-hour TV "Love Saves the Earth" and the 3.11 commemoration event Yuzuru Hanyu Notte Stellata. In ice shows, Hanyu has performed live with renowned artists like Japanese singers Toshi and Dean Fujioka, the J-pop band Chemistry, and the Tokyo Philharmonic Orchestra.

The background and making of Hanyu's programs was broadly covered by the media, especially the creation of his signature free skate Seimei and other Olympic programs. Experts in- and outside figure skating praised the high technical quality, mature choreographies and musical interpretation, elaborate costumes, as well as the programs' lyrical and intellectual depth. These features enabled Hanyu to weave his programs into comprehensive philosophical stories written by himself, creating a new genre of performing art and entertainment. His first two Ice Stories included 12 programs each, presented at his record-breaking solo ice shows Gift at Tokyo Dome in 2023, the Repray Tour in 2023–24 and the Echoes of Life Tour in 2024–25, produced and directed by Hanyu himself in collaboration with Japanese choreographer Mikiko.

In 2020, the music from 23 programs of Hanyu's competitive career was performed in a special concert titled Music with Wings at Tokyo International Forum, featuring an orchestra of one hundred musicians as well as violinist Ikuko Kawai and pianist Kotaro Fukuma among the guest artists. Selections of Hanyu's programs were also published as home videos titled Time of Awakening (2014) and Time of Evolution (2019), summarizing his competitive career until the 2017–18 figure skating season.

== Figure skating programs ==
=== Competition and exhibition programs ===
- The program details are mentioned at their first occurrence only.
- Encore performances are not included in the list.
- Olympic seasons are highlighted in blue.
- Programs performed at the Winter Olympics are highlighted in **bold**.

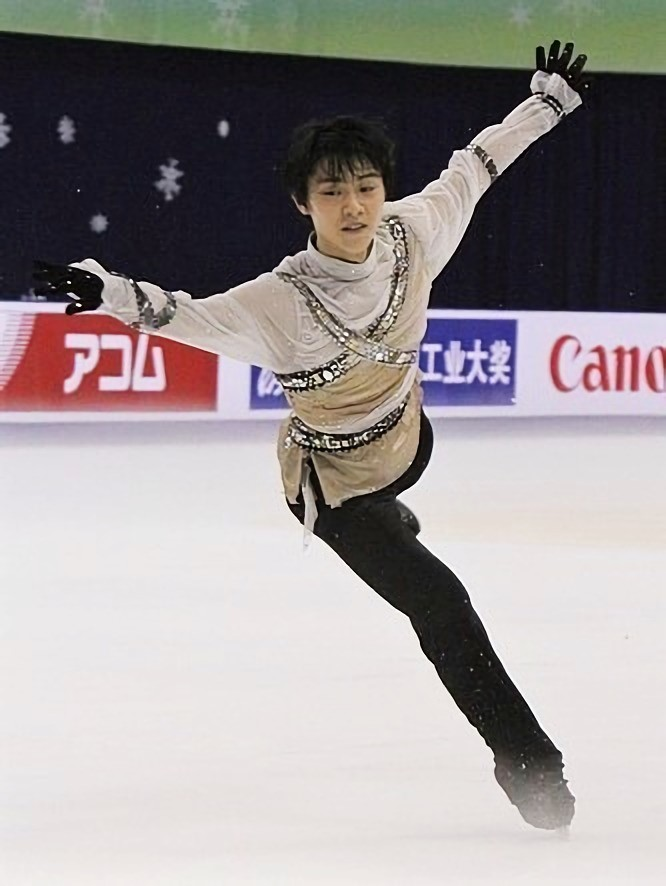
Romeo + Juliet

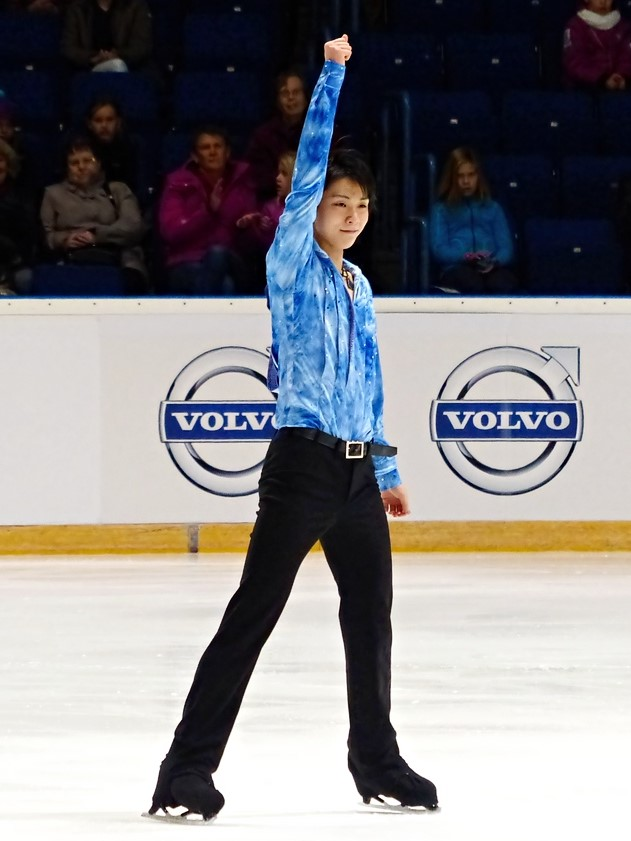
"Parisienne Walkways"

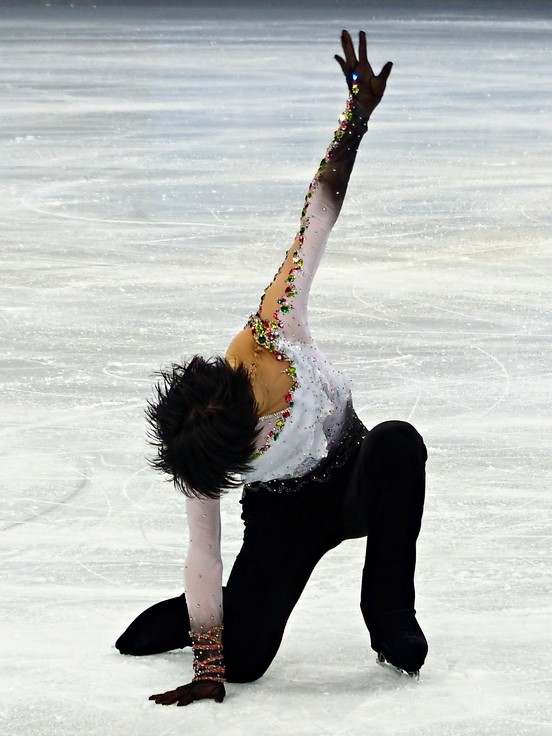
Romeo and Juliet

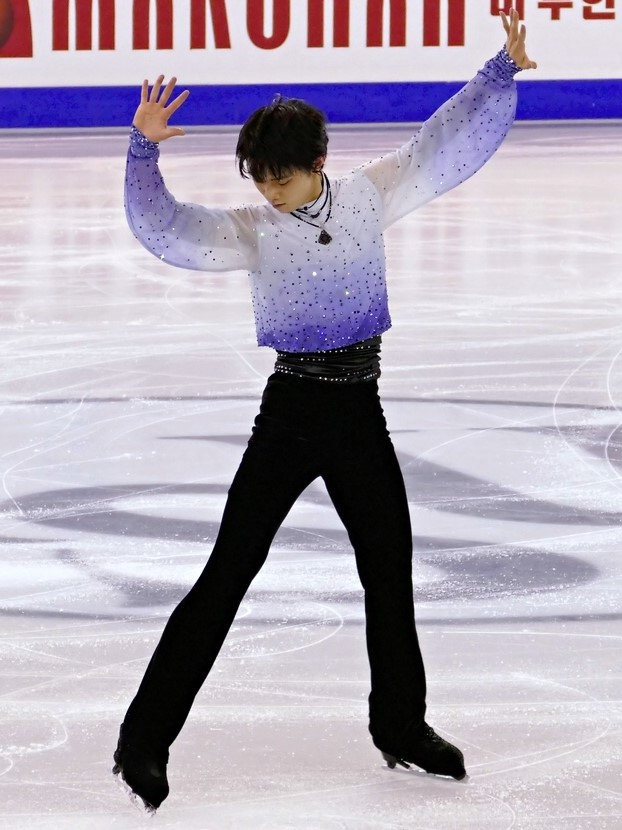
Ballade No. 1 in G minor

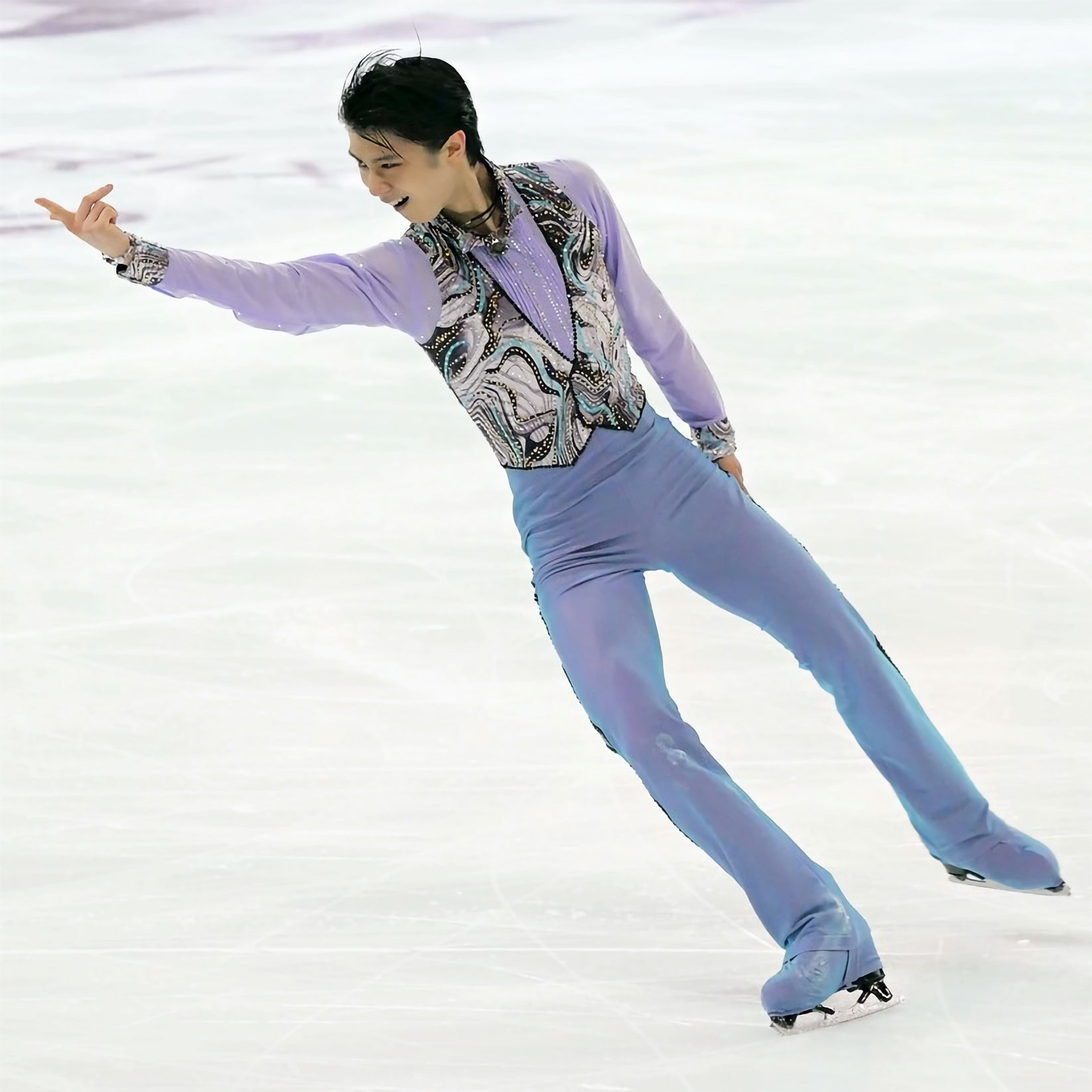
"Let's Go Crazy"

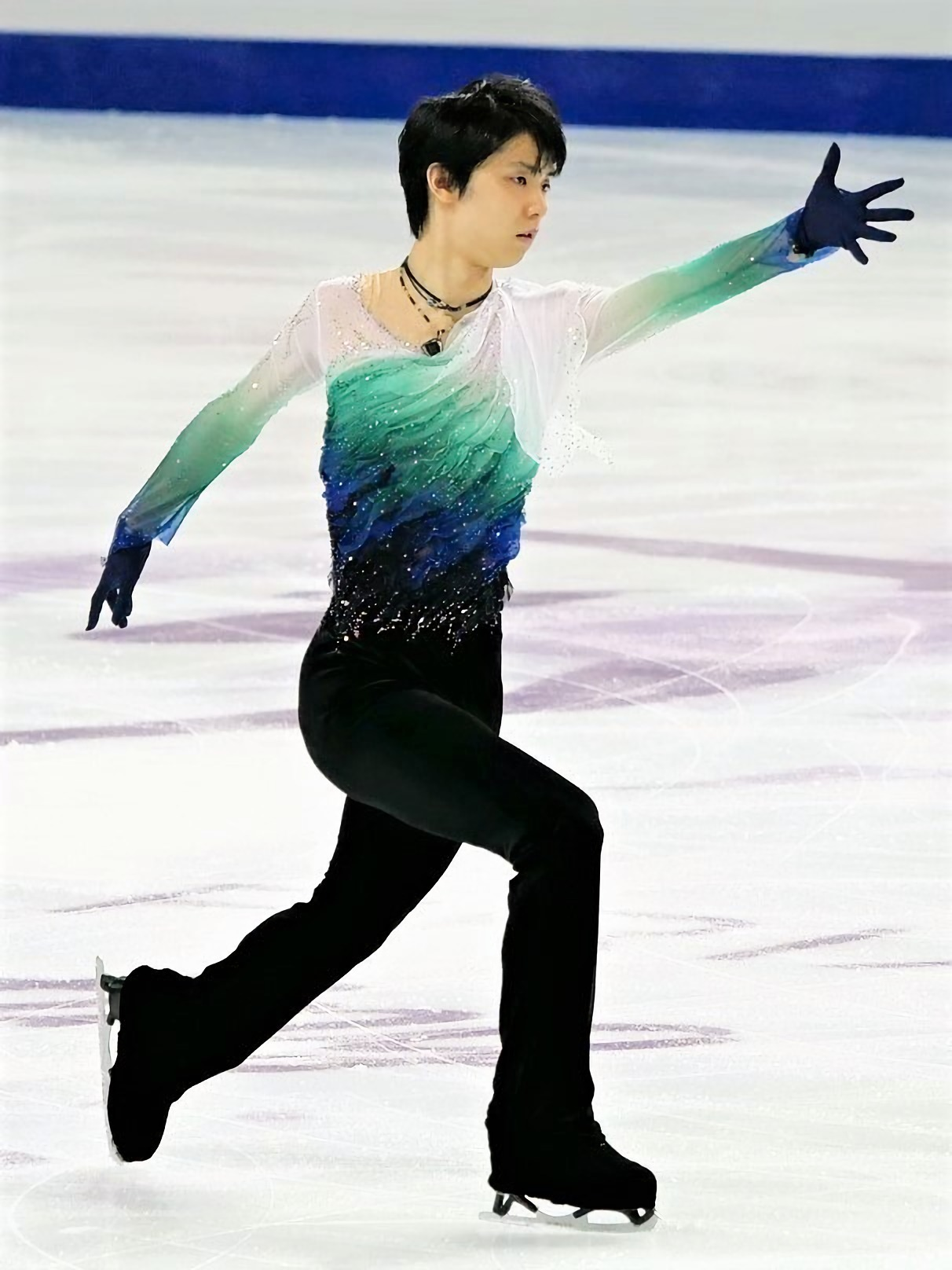
Hope and Legacy

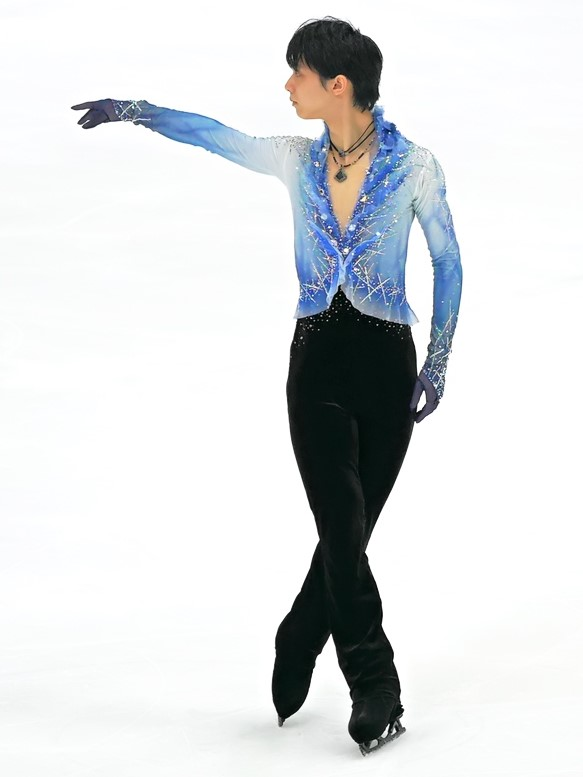
"Otoñal"

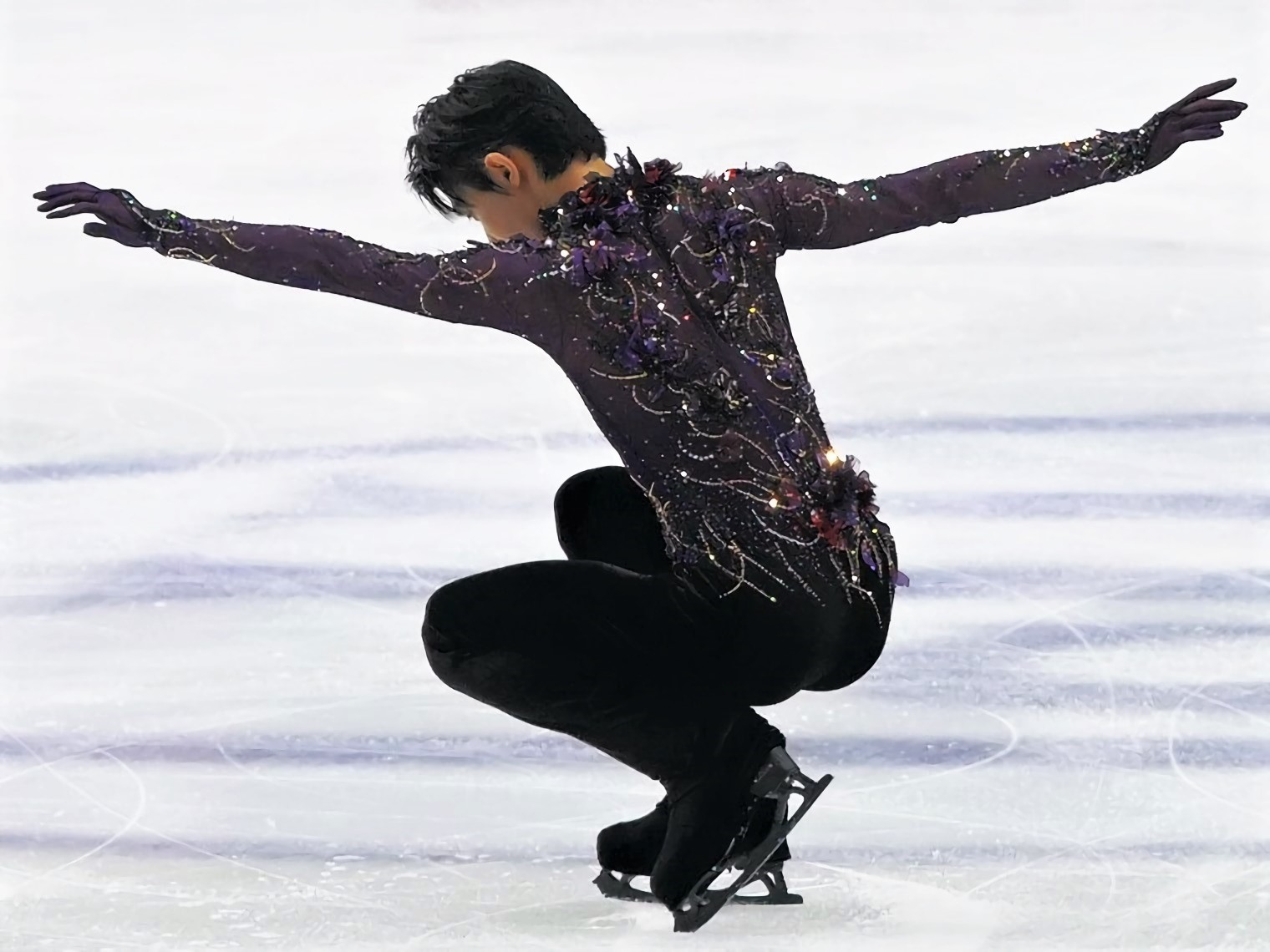
Origin

Competition and exhibition programs by season
Season	Short program	Free skate program	Exhibition program
2004–05	Spartacus: Composed by Aram Khachaturian; Choreo. by Shōichirō Tsuzuki	From Russia with Love: Composed by John Barry; Choreo. by Shōichirō Tsuzuki	—N/a
2005–06	—N/a	From Russia with Love	—N/a
2006–07	Medley: 1. "Amazonic"; 2. "Totentanz" (by Franz Liszt); Performed by Maksim Mrvica; Choreo. by Megumu Seki	"Summer Storm": Based on "Storm" from The Four Seasons; Performed by Ikuko Kawai; Choreo. by Megumu Seki	—N/a
2007–08	"Sing, Sing, Sing": Performed by Louis Prima; Choreo. by Nanami Abe	The Firebird: Composed by Igor Stravinsky; Choreo. by Nanami Abe	"Sing, Sing, Sing"
2008–09	"Bolero": From Moulin Rouge!; Composed by Steve Sharples; Choreo. by Nanami Abe	Rhapsody on a Theme of Paganini: Composed by Sergei Rachmaninoff; Choreo. by Nanami Abe	"Change": Performed by Monkey Majik, Yoshida Brothers; Choreo. by Nanami Abe
2009–10	Mission: Impossible II: Composed by Hans Zimmer; Choreo. by Nanami Abe; **Tracks used**: 1. "The Bait"; 2. "Bare Island"	Rhapsody on a Theme of Paganini	"Change"
2010–11	"White Legend": Based on Swan Lake; Composed by Pyotr Ilyich Tchaikovsky; Performed by Ikuko Kawai; Choreo. by Nanami Abe	Zigeunerweisen: Composed by Pablo de Sarasate; Choreo. by Nanami Abe	"Vertigo": Performed by U2; Choreo. by Nanami Abe
2011–12	Étude in D-sharp minor: Composed by Alexander Scriabin; Performed by Maksim Mrvica; Choreo. by Nanami Abe, Natalia Bestemianova, Igor Bobrin	Romeo + Juliet: Composed by Craig Armstrong; Choreo. by Nanami Abe, Natalia Bestemianova, Igor Bobrin; **Tracks used**: 1. "O Verona"; 2. "Kissing You" (performed by Des'ree); 3. "Escape" (from Plunkett & Macleane)	"Vertigo"
2011–12	Étude in D-sharp minor: Composed by Alexander Scriabin; Performed by Maksim Mrvica; Choreo. by Nanami Abe, Natalia Bestemianova, Igor Bobrin	Romeo + Juliet: Composed by Craig Armstrong; Choreo. by Nanami Abe, Natalia Bestemianova, Igor Bobrin; **Tracks used**: 1. "O Verona"; 2. "Kissing You" (performed by Des'ree); 3. "Escape" (from Plunkett & Macleane)	"Somebody to Love": Performed by Justin Bieber; Choreo. by Nanami Abe
2011–12	Étude in D-sharp minor: Composed by Alexander Scriabin; Performed by Maksim Mrvica; Choreo. by Nanami Abe, Natalia Bestemianova, Igor Bobrin	Romeo + Juliet: Composed by Craig Armstrong; Choreo. by Nanami Abe, Natalia Bestemianova, Igor Bobrin; **Tracks used**: 1. "O Verona"; 2. "Kissing You" (performed by Des'ree); 3. "Escape" (from Plunkett & Macleane)	"White Legend"
2012–13	"Parisienne Walkways": 1. "Parisienne Walkways"; Performed by Gary Moore; 2. "Hoochie Coochie Man"; From Live at Montreux 1999; Performed by Jeff Healey Band; Choreo. by Jeffrey Buttle	Notre-Dame de Paris: Composed by Riccardo Cocciante; Choreo. by David Wilson; **Tracks used**: 1. "Le Temps des cathédrales" 2. "Les Sans-papiers"; 3. "Tu vas me détruire" 4. "Danse Mon Esmeralda"	"Hello, I Love You": Performed by The Doors; Remixed by Adam Freeland; Choreo. by Kurt Browning
2012–13	"Parisienne Walkways": 1. "Parisienne Walkways"; Performed by Gary Moore; 2. "Hoochie Coochie Man"; From Live at Montreux 1999; Performed by Jeff Healey Band; Choreo. by Jeffrey Buttle	Notre-Dame de Paris: Composed by Riccardo Cocciante; Choreo. by David Wilson; **Tracks used**: 1. "Le Temps des cathédrales" 2. "Les Sans-papiers"; 3. "Tu vas me détruire" 4. "Danse Mon Esmeralda"	"Hana ni nare" (花になれ, lit. 'Become a flower'): Performed by Fumiya Sashida; Choreo. by Kenji Miyamoto
2013–14	"**Parisienne Walkways**" (Background and making)	**Romeo and Juliet** (Background and making): Composed by Nino Rota; Choreo. by David Wilson; **Tracks used**: 1. "The Ride from Mantua"; 2. "Love Theme"	Étude in D-sharp minor
2013–14	"**Parisienne Walkways**" (Background and making)	**Romeo and Juliet** (Background and making): Composed by Nino Rota; Choreo. by David Wilson; **Tracks used**: 1. "The Ride from Mantua"; 2. "Love Theme"	Notre-Dame de Paris
2013–14	"**Parisienne Walkways**" (Background and making)	**Romeo and Juliet** (Background and making): Composed by Nino Rota; Choreo. by David Wilson; **Tracks used**: 1. "The Ride from Mantua"; 2. "Love Theme"	"Story": Performed by Ai; Choreo. by Kenji Miyamoto
2013–14	"**Parisienne Walkways**" (Background and making)	**Romeo and Juliet** (Background and making): Composed by Nino Rota; Choreo. by David Wilson; **Tracks used**: 1. "The Ride from Mantua"; 2. "Love Theme"	"Hana ni nare"
2013–14	"**Parisienne Walkways**" (Background and making)	**Romeo and Juliet** (Background and making): Composed by Nino Rota; Choreo. by David Wilson; **Tracks used**: 1. "The Ride from Mantua"; 2. "Love Theme"	"**White Legend**"
2013–14	"**Parisienne Walkways**" (Background and making)	**Romeo and Juliet** (Background and making): Composed by Nino Rota; Choreo. by David Wilson; **Tracks used**: 1. "The Ride from Mantua"; 2. "Love Theme"	Romeo + Juliet
2014–15	Ballade No. 1 in G minor: Composed by Frédéric Chopin; Performed by Krystian Zimerman; Choreo. by Jeffrey Buttle	The Phantom of the Opera: Composed by Andrew Lloyd Webber; Choreo. by Shae-Lynn Bourne; **Tracks used**: 1. "The Music of the Night"; 2. "The Point of No Return"; 3. "Phantasia"	"Flowers Will Bloom: Composed by Yoko Kanno; Performed by Fumiya Sashida; Choreo. by Nanami Abe
2014–15	Ballade No. 1 in G minor: Composed by Frédéric Chopin; Performed by Krystian Zimerman; Choreo. by Jeffrey Buttle	The Phantom of the Opera: Composed by Andrew Lloyd Webber; Choreo. by Shae-Lynn Bourne; **Tracks used**: 1. "The Music of the Night"; 2. "The Point of No Return"; 3. "Phantasia"	"The Final Time Traveler": Composed by Hideki Sakamoto; Performed by Sarah Àlainn; Choreo. by Kenji Miyamoto
2014–15	Ballade No. 1 in G minor: Composed by Frédéric Chopin; Performed by Krystian Zimerman; Choreo. by Jeffrey Buttle	The Phantom of the Opera: Composed by Andrew Lloyd Webber; Choreo. by Shae-Lynn Bourne; **Tracks used**: 1. "The Music of the Night"; 2. "The Point of No Return"; 3. "Phantasia"	"Parisienne Walkways"
2015–16	Ballade No. 1 in G minor	Seimei: From Onmyoji, Onmyoji II; Composed by Shigeru Umebayashi; Choreo. by Shae-Lynn Bourne; **Tracks used**: 1. "Onmyoji main theme" 2. "Araburu kami" (荒ぶる神); 3. "Gobōsei" (五芒星); 4. "Onmyoji II main theme"	"Requiem of Heaven and Earth": From Requiem for the Great East Japan Earthquake 3.11; Performed by Yasunobu Matsuo; Choreo. by Kenji Miyamoto
2016–17	"Let's Go Crazy": Performed by Prince; Choreo. by Jeffrey Buttle	Hope and Legacy: Composed by Joe Hisaishi; Choreo. by Shae-Lynn Bourne; **Tracks used**: 1. "View of Silence" (from Pretender); 2. "Asian Dream Song" (from Piano Stories II – The Wind of Life)	"Notte Stellata (The Swan)": Composed by Camille Saint-Saëns, Tony Renis; Performed by Il Volo; Choreo. by David Wilson
2017–18	**Ballade No. 1 in G minor** (Background and making)	**Seimei** (Background and making)	"**Notte Stellata (The Swan)**"
2018–19	"Otoñal" (lit. 'Autumnal'): Composed by Raúl Di Blasio; Choreo. by Jeffrey Buttle	Origin: Composed by Edvin Marton; Choreo. by Shae-Lynn Bourne; **Tracks used**: 1. "Art On Ice"; 2. "Magic Stradivarius"	"Haru yo, koi": Composed by Yumi Matsutoya; Performed by Shinya Kiyozuka; Choreo. by David Wilson
2019–20	"Otoñal"	Origin	"Parisienne Walkways"
2019–20	"Otoñal"	Origin	"Haru yo, koi"
2019–20	"Otoñal"	Origin	"Notte Stellata (The Swan)"
2019–20	"Otoñal"	Origin	Seimei
2019–20	Ballade No. 1 in G minor	Seimei	Hope and Legacy
2020–21	"Let Me Entertain You": Performed by Robbie Williams; Choreo. by Jeffrey Buttle	Heaven and Earth (天と地と) (Ten to chi to, lit. 'Heaven and earth and'): From the NHK taiga drama series; Composed by Isao Tomita; Choreo. by Shae-Lynn Bourne; **Tracks used**: 1. Ten to Chi to (opening theme); 2. Shin Heike Monogatari (opening theme); 3. Ten to Chi to ("Winter of Echigo")	"Haru yo, koi"
2020–21	"Let Me Entertain You": Performed by Robbie Williams; Choreo. by Jeffrey Buttle	Heaven and Earth (天と地と) (Ten to chi to, lit. 'Heaven and earth and'): From the NHK taiga drama series; Composed by Isao Tomita; Choreo. by Shae-Lynn Bourne; **Tracks used**: 1. Ten to Chi to (opening theme); 2. Shin Heike Monogatari (opening theme); 3. Ten to Chi to ("Winter of Echigo")	"Hana wa saku"
2021–22	**Introduction and Rondo Capriccioso** (Background and making): Composed by Camille Saint-Saëns; Performed by Shinya Kiyozuka; Choreo. by Jeffrey Buttle, Shae-Lynn Bourne	**Heaven and Earth** (天と地と) (Background and making)	"Let Me Entertain You"
2021–22	**Introduction and Rondo Capriccioso** (Background and making): Composed by Camille Saint-Saëns; Performed by Shinya Kiyozuka; Choreo. by Jeffrey Buttle, Shae-Lynn Bourne	**Heaven and Earth** (天と地と) (Background and making)	"**Haru yo, koi**"

=== Show programs as a competitive skater ===
- Live collaborations with other skaters and artists are highlighted in purple.
- Programs performed at three or more ice shows within the same year are only listed with selected shows.
- Show openings and finales are not included in the list.

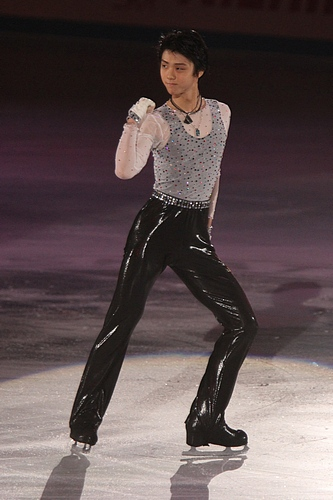
"Vertigo"

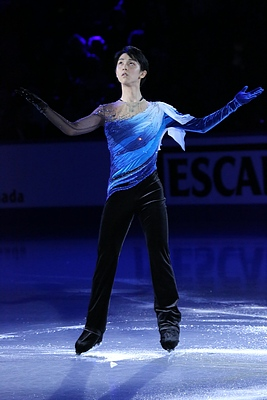
Étude in D-sharp minor

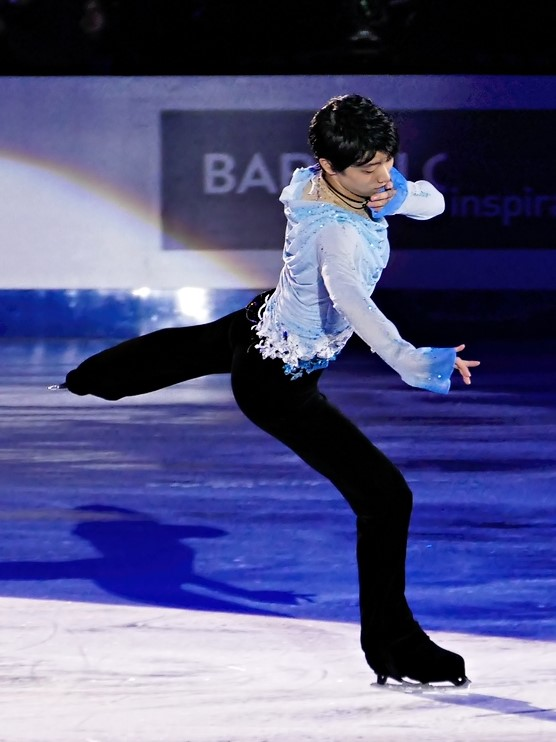
"The Final Time Traveler"

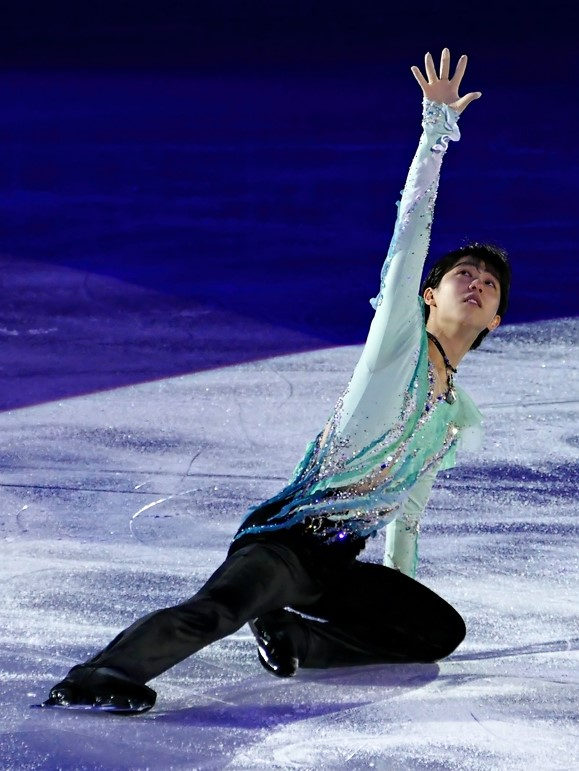
"Requiem of Heaven and Earth"

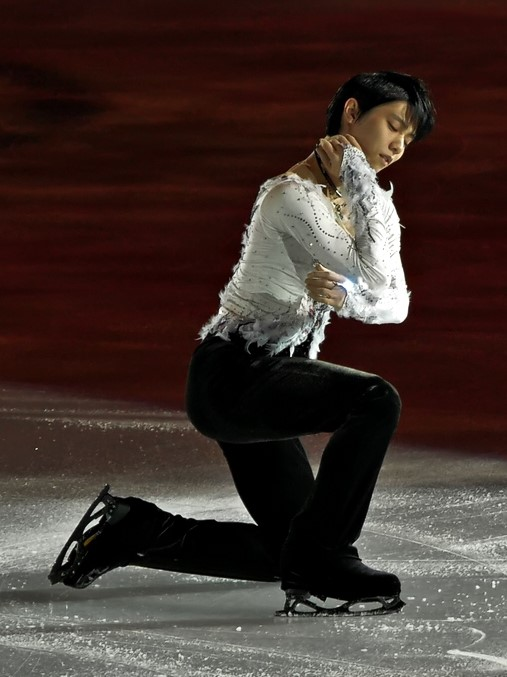
"Notte Stellata"

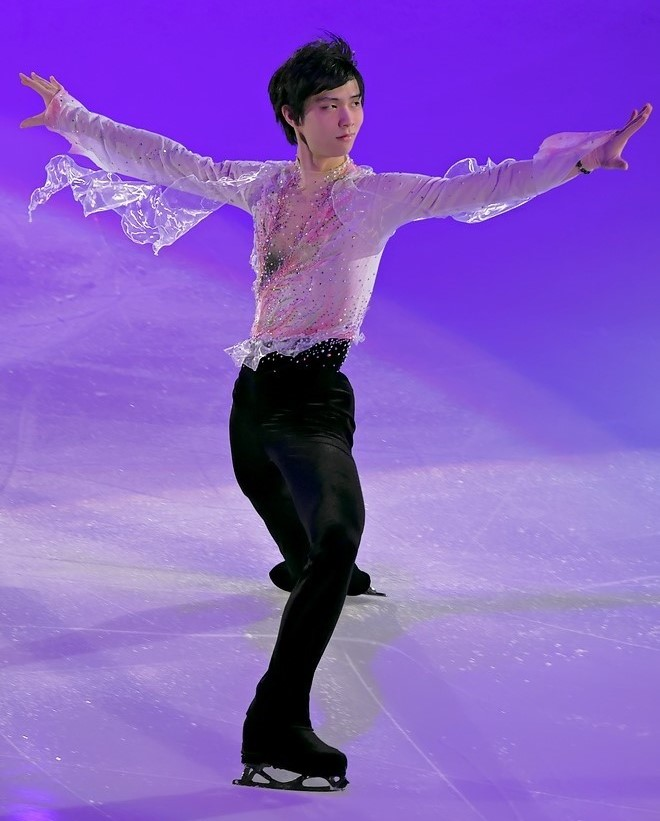
"Haru yo, koi"

Show programs as a competitive skater by year
Year	Program	Event
2008	"Bolero"	Dreams on Ice, Sendai Winter Park
2008	Amazonic	Carnival on Ice
2009	"Change"	Japan Super Challenge
2009	Mission: Impossible II	Dreams on Ice
2010	"Vertigo"	Various shows (e.g. Stars on Ice)
2010	Rhapsody on a Theme of Paganini	Ice Rink Sendai Demonstration
2010	"White Legend"	Dreams on Ice, Fantasy on Ice
2011	"Change"	Nagoya Skate Festival, Stars on Ice
2011	"White Legend"	3.11. charity shows, Japan Open
2011	Zigeunerweisen	Prince Ice World
2011	Romeo + Juliet	Fantasy on Ice, Dreams on Ice, The Ice
2011	Étude in D-sharp minor	Various shows (e.g. Friends on Ice, The Ice, Fantasy on Ice)
2011	"Vertigo"	Fantasy on Ice
2012	"Somebody to Love"	Stars on Ice
2012	Étude in D-sharp minor	Stars on Ice
2012	"Hello, I Love You"	Prince Ice World, The Ice
2012	"Parisienne Walkways"	The Ice
2012	"Hana ni nare": Performed live with Fumiya Sashida	Fantasy on Ice
2012	Notre-Dame de Paris	Fantasy on Ice
2013	"Hello, I love you"	Stars on Ice
2013	"Hana ni nare"	Nagoya Skate Festival
2013	"True Love": Performed live with Fumiya Fujii; Choreo. by Kenji Miyamoto	Art on Ice
2013	"Parisienne Walkways"	Art on Ice, Dreams on Ice
2013	"Story": Performed live with Ai	Fantasy on Ice
2014	"White Legend"	Various shows (e.g. Stars on Ice)
2014	"Parisienne Walkways"	Various shows (e.g. World Osaka Exhibition, Fantasy on Ice)
2014	"Hana ni nare"	Various shows (e.g. World Osaka Exhibition, Stars on Ice)
2014	"Change": Performed live with Monkey Majik, Yoshida Brothers	Together on Ice
2014	"Ienai yo" (言えないよ, lit. 'I can't say'): Performed live with Hiromi Go; Choreo. by Pasquale Camerlengo	Fantasy on Ice
2014	Ballade No. 1 in G minor	Dreams on Ice, Fantasy on Ice
2014	"The Final Time Traveler": Performed live with Sarah Àlainn	Fantasy on Ice
2014	Romeo and Juliet	24-hour TV "Love Saves the Earth"
2015	"Believe": Performed live with Che'Nelle; Choreo. by Kenji Miyamoto	Fantasy on Ice
2015	"Vertigo"	Fantasy on Ice
2015	"Hello, I Love You"	Fantasy on Ice
2015	Seimei	Dreams on Ice, Fantasy on Ice
2015	"Requiem of Heaven and Earth"	Fantasy on Ice, 24-hour TV "Love Saves the Earth"
2016	"Hana wa saku": Performed live with singer Misaki Usuzawa and skaters Shizuka Arakawa, Akiko Suzuki, Takeshi Honda	NHK Trophy Special Exhibition
2016	"Requiem of Heaven and Earth"	NHK Trophy Special Exhibition
2016	"White Legend"	24-hour TV "Love Saves the Earth"
2017	Ballade No. 1 in G minor	Fantasy on Ice
2017	"Ienai yo": Performed live with Hiromi Go	24-hour TV "Love Saves the Earth"
2017	"Hana ni nare"	Kametaro Midsummer Ice Festival
2018	Continues with Wings programs	Continues with Wings
2018	"Wings of Words": Composed by Yukinojo Mori, Yoko Kasinagaya, Naohisa Taniguchi; Performed live with Chemistry	Fantasy on Ice
2018	Hope and Legacy	Heroes and Future
2018	"Haru yo, koi": Performed live with Shinya Kiyozuka	Fantasy on Ice
2018	"Notte Stellata (The Swan)"	24-hour TV "Love Saves the Earth"
2019	"Masquerade" (マスカレイド): Performed live with Toshi; Choreo. by Shae-Lynn Bourne	Fantasy on Ice
2019	"Crystal Memories": Performed live with Toshi; Choreo. by David Wilson	Fantasy on Ice
2019	"Haru yo, koi": Performed live with Yumi Matsutoya, Shinya Kiyozuka	24-hour TV "Love Saves the Earth"
2021	"Let's Go Crazy"	Stars on Ice
2021	"Masquerade"	Dreams on Ice
2021	"White Legend"	24-hour TV "Love Saves the Earth"
2021	"Hana ni nare"	24-hour TV "Love Saves the Earth"
2022	"Real Face": Performed live with Shikao Suga; Choreo. by Shae-Lynn Bourne, Yuzuru Hanyu	Fantasy on Ice
2022	"Raison" (レゾン): Performed live with Taisei Miyakawa; Choreo. by David Wilson, Yuzuru Hanyu	Fantasy on Ice

=== Show programs as a professional skater ===
Show programs as a professional skater by year
Year	Program	Event
2022	"Introduction and Rondo Capriccioso"	24-hour TV "Love Saves the Earth"
2022	"Change": Performed live with Kōki Nakamura	Prologue
2022	"A Fleeting Dream" (いつか終わる夢, Itsuka owaru yume, lit. 'A dream that ends one day'): From Final Fantasy X; Composed by Nobuo Uematsu, Masashi Hamauzu; Choreo. by Yuzuru Hanyu	Prologue
2022	Prologue programs	Prologue
2023	"One Summer's Day" (あの夏へ, lit. 'To That Summer'): From the movie Spirited Away; Composed by Joe Hisaishi; Performed live with Elevenplay, Tokyo Philharmonic Orchestra; Choreo. by David Wilson	Gift
2023	"Ashura-chan": Performed by Ado; Performed live with Elevenplay; Choreo. by Yuzuru Hanyu	Gift
2023	Gift programs	Gift
2023	"Conquest of Paradise": Composed by Vangelis; Performed live with Kōhei Uchimura; Choreo. by David Wilson, Yuzuru Hanyu	Yuzuru Hanyu Notte Stellata
2023	"Dynamite" (Hanyu's dance performance shown on screen): Performed by BTS; Performed live with Shae-Lynn Bourne Turok, Rika Hongo, Takahito Mura, Akiko Suzuki; Choreo. by Kenji Miyamoto	Yuzuru Hanyu Notte Stellata
2023	2023 Yuzuru Hanyu Notte Stellata programs	Yuzuru Hanyu Notte Stellata
2023	"The Phantom of the Opera"	Stars on Ice
2023	"Ashura-chan"	Stars on Ice
2023	"One Summer's Day"	Stars on Ice
2023	"If ...": Performed by Da Pump; Performed live with Issa, Kimi (Da Pump); Choreo. by Yuzuru Hanyu	Fantasy on Ice
2023	"Glamorous Sky": Performed live with Mika Nakashima; Choreo. by Yuzuru Hanyu	Fantasy on Ice
2023	"Gate of Living" (鶏と蛇と豚, Niwatori to hebi to buta, lit. 'Chicken and snake and pig'): Performed by Ringo Sheena; Choreo. by Mikiko, Yuzuru Hanyu	Repray Tour
2023	"Megalovania": From Undertale; Composed by Toby Fox; Remixed by Music Engine; Choreo. by Yuzuru Hanyu	Repray Tour
2023	"The Darkness of Eternity" (破滅への使者, Hametsu e no shisha, lit. 'Messenger to Destruction'): From Final Fantasy IX; Composed by Nobuo Uematsu; Performed by Shinya Kiyozuka; Choreo. by Yuzuru Hanyu	Repray Tour
2023	"A Fleeting Dream;re" (piano version): From Final Fantasy X; Composed by Nobuo Uematsu, Masashi Hamauzu; Performed by Shinya Kiyozuka; Choreo. by Yuzuru Hanyu	Repray Tour
2023	Repray Tour programs	Repray Tour
2024	"Carmina Burana": Performed live with Mao Daichi; Choreo. by Shae-Lynn Bourne, Rino Masaki	Yuzuru Hanyu Notte Stellata
2024	"Permission to Dance" (Hanyu's dance performance shown on screen): Performed by BTS; Performed live with Shae-Lynn Bourne Turok, Rika Hongo, Takahito Mura, Akiko Suzuki, Keiji Tanaka	Yuzuru Hanyu Notte Stellata
2024	"Danny Boy": Performed by Keith Jarrett; Choreo. by David Wilson	Yuzuru Hanyu Notte Stellata, Fantasy on Ice
2024	2024 Yuzuru Hanyu Notte Stellata programs	Yuzuru Hanyu Notte Stellata
2024	"Meteor": Performed by Takanori Nishikawa (T.M. Revolution); Performed live with Takanori Nishikawa; Choreo. by Yuzuru Hanyu	Fantasy on Ice
2024	"Haru yo, koi": Composed by Yumi Matsutoya; Performed by Shinya Kiyozuka; Choreo. by David Wilson	Noto Peninsula reconstruction support charity performance
2024	"First Pulse": Composed by Kenji Hiramatsu (original song); Choreo. by Yuzuru Hanyu	Echoes of Life Tour
2024	"First Cry~ Circulation" (Ubugoe〜 meguri): From Wolf Children; Composed by Masakatsu Takagi; Choreo. by Yuzuru Hanyu	Echoes of Life Tour
2024	"Utai iv: Reawakening": From Ghost in the Shell; Composed by Kenji Kawai; Choreo. by Mikiko	Echoes of Life Tour
2024	"Mass Destruction": From Persona 3 Reload; Composed by Lotus Juice; Choreo. by emmy (Elevenplay), Yuzuru Hanyu, Mikiko	Echoes of Life Tour
2024	"Piano Collection": Performed by Shinya Kiyozuka; Choreo. by Jeffrey Buttle	Echoes of Life Tour
2024	"Ballade No. 1 in G minor": Composed by Frédéric Chopin; Performed by Krystian Zimerman; Choreo. by Jeffrey Buttle	Echoes of Life Tour
2024	"Goliath": Composed by Moppy Sound (もっぴーさうんど); Choreo. by Yuzuru Hanyu	Echoes of Life Tour
2024	"Aqua's Journey": Composed by Moppy Sound (もっぴーさうんど); Choreo. by Yuzuru Hanyu	Echoes of Life Tour
2024	"Eclipse/Blue": Composed by Nosaj Thing; Choreo. by Yuzuru Hanyu	Echoes of Life Tour
2024	"Gate of Steiner – Aesthetics on Ice": From Steins;Gate; Composed by Takeshi Abo; Choreo. by Yuzuru Hanyu	Echoes of Life Tour
2024	"Danny Boy": Performed by Keith Jarrett; Choreo. by David Wilson	Echoes of Life Tour
2024	"Hymn of the Soul" (全ての人の魂の戦い, Subete no hito no tamashī no tatakai, lit. 'Battle for Everyone's Souls'): From Persona 3 Reload; Composed by Haruko Komiya; Choreo. by Yuzuru Hanyu	Echoes of Life Tour
2024	Echoes of Life Tour programs	Echoes of Life Tour
2025	Mansai Boléro: Performed live with Mansai Nomura, Shae-Lynn Bourne Turok, Satoko Miyahara, Akiko Suzuki, Takahito Mura, Keiji Tanaka; Choreo. by Mansai Nomura, Shae-Lynn Bourne	Yuzuru Hanyu Notte Stellata
2025	"Seimei": Performed live with Mansai Nomura	Yuzuru Hanyu Notte Stellata
2025	2025 Yuzuru Hanyu Notte Stellata programs	Yuzuru Hanyu Notte Stellata
2025	"Haru yo, koi": Composed by Yumi Matsutoya; Performed by Shinya Kiyozuka; Choreo. by David Wilson	The First Skate
2025	"Bow and Arrow": From Medalist; Composed by Kenshi Yonezu; Choreo. by Yuzuru Hanyu	Bow and Arrow Music Video (Kenshi Yonezu Official YouTube Channel)
2026	Happy End: Composed by Ryuichi Sakamoto; Performed live with Tohoku Youth Orchestra; Choreo. by Yuzuru Hanyu, Nanako (Elevenplay)	Yuzuru Hanyu Notte Stellata
2026	Yae no Sakura: From Yae no Sakura; Composed by Ryuichi Sakamoto; Performed live with Tohoku Youth Orchestra; Choreo. by David Wilson, Yuzuru Hanyu	Yuzuru Hanyu Notte Stellata
2026	2026 Yuzuru Hanyu Notte Stellata programs	Yuzuru Hanyu Notte Stellata
2026	Prequel: Before the White: Composed by Marihiko Hara; Choreo. by Mikiko, Yuzuru Hanyu	Realive
2026	Realive programs	Realive
2026	"Ikue": Composed by Yujin Kitagawa and Marihiko Hara; Performed by Yuzu; Choreo. by Yuzuru Hanyu	NHK special program commemorating the 15th anniversary of the Great East Japan Earthquake

=== Programs recorded exclusively on YouTube ===
Programs on Hanyu's official YouTube channel by year
Year	Program	Video
2022	"Yumemiru shōkei" (夢見る憧憬, lit. 'Dreamy Aspiration'): Composed by MoppySound (もっぴーさうんど); Choreo. by Yuzuru Hanyu	October 5, 2022 on YouTube
2022	"Sasanqua" (サザンカ): Performed by Sekai no Owari; Choreo. by Yuzuru Hanyu	December 24, 2022 on YouTube
2023	"Boku no koto" (僕のこと, lit. 'About me'): Performed by Mrs. Green Apple; Choreo. by Yuzuru Hanyu	February 26, 2023 on YouTube (Ending credits of Gift)
2023	"Goliath" (ゴリアテ): Composed by MoppySound; Choreo. by Yuzuru Hanyu	December 24, 2023 on YouTube
2023	"Akua no tabiji" (アクアの旅路, lit. 'Aqua's journey'): Composed by MoppySound; Choreo. by Yuzuru Hanyu	December 24, 2023 on YouTube
2024	Lufia II: Rise of the Sinistrals (エストポリス伝記II, Estpolis Denki II): Composed by Yasunori Shiono; Remixed by Music Engine; Choreo. by Yuzuru Hanyu; **Tracks used**: 1. "The Prophet"; 2. "The Savior of Those on Earth"; 3. "Battle #1"; 4. "Battle #2"	April 14, 2024 on YouTube (Ending credits of the Repray Tour)
2024	"Last Ambient" (ラストアンビエント): Performed by Taisei Miyakawa; Choreo. by Yuzuru Hanyu	October 25, 2024 on YouTube
2025	"Danny Boy for "Ogensan" and "Families"-Full Version" (Danny Boy for ”おげんさん”and ”families”-Full Version): Performed by Keith Jarrett; Choreo. by David Wilson	May 22, 2025 on YouTube
2025	"Danny Boy for "Ogensan" and "Families”-Short Version" (Danny Boy for ”おげんさん”and ”families”-Short Version): Performed by Keith Jarret	May 22, 2025 on YouTube
2025	”Mass Destruction Reload”: Performed by Lotus Juice, Azumi Takahashi, ATLUS Sound Team; Choreo. by emmy (Elevenplay), Mikiko, Yuzuru Hanyu	July 19, 2025 on YouTube
2026	"Gate of Living": Performed by Sheena Ringo; Choreo. by Mikiko, Yuzuru Hanyu	January 1, 2026 on YouTube

== Music with Wings program concert ==
Event information

- Original title: 羽生結弦プログラムコンサート ～Music with Wings～
- Organizer: TV Asahi, CIC Co., Ltd.
- Venue: Tokyo International Forum (hall A)
- Date: January 6–7, 2020

Invited artists and orchestra

- Conductor: Daisuke Nagamine
- Violinist: Ikuko Kawai
- Pianists: Kotaro Fukuma, Toshiya Shioiri
- Tenor singer: Satoshi Chubachi
- Music with Wings orchestra (ca. 100 musicians)

Music with Wings set list (first half)
No.	Program title	Artist
1	"Summer Storm"	Ikuko Kawai (with orchestra)
2	Ultraman Gaia	Music with Wings orchestra
3	"Camptown Races"	Music with Wings orchestra
4	From Russia with Love	Music with Wings orchestra
5	"Sing, Sing, Sing"	Music with Wings orchestra
6	The Firebird	Music with Wings orchestra
7	Mission: Impossible II	Music with Wings orchestra
8	Rhapsody on a Theme of Paganini	Kotaro Fukuma (with orchestra)
9	"White Legend"	Ikuko Kawai (with orchestra)
10	Zigeunerweisen	Ikuko Kawai (with orchestra)
11	Étude in D-sharp minor	Kotaro Fukuma (with orchestra)
12	Romeo + Juliet	Music with Wings orchestra

Music with Wings set list (second half)
No.	Program title	Artist
13	"Parisienne Walkways"	Music with Wings orchestra
14	Notre-Dame de Paris	Music with Wings orchestra
15	Romeo and Juliet	Music with Wings orchestra
16	"Requiem of Heaven and Earth"	Toshiya Shioiri
17	Hope and Legacy ("Asian Dream Song")	Toshiya Shioiri (with orchestra)
18	"Notte Stellata (The Swan)"	Satoshi Chubachi, Toshiya Shioiri
19	The Phantom of the Opera	Satoshi Chubachi (with orchestra)
20	Ballade No. 1 in G minor	Kotaro Fukuma
21	"Otoñal"	Toshiya Shioiri (with orchestra)
22	Origin ("Art on Ice")	Ikuko Kawai (with orchestra)
23	Seimei	Music with Wings orchestra

== Home media ==
=== Yuzuru Hanyu "Time of Awakening" ===
- Original title: 羽生結弦「覚醒の時」
- Language: Japanese
- Released: July 16, 2014
- Labels: Fuji TV, Pony Canyon
- Formats: DVD (Region 2), Blu-ray
- Runtime: 170 minutes (1 disc)

Yuzuru Hanyu "Time of Awakening" track list
No.	Program title	Event	Segment
1	"White Legend"	2010–11 Japan Championships	Short program
2	Étude in D-sharp minor	2011–12 Japan Championships	Short program
3	"Parisienne Walkways"	2012–13 Japan Championships	Short program
4	"Parisienne Walkways"	2013–14 Japan Championships	Short program
5	"Parisienne Walkways"	2014 Winter Olympics	Short program
6	Zigeunerweisen	2011 Four Continents Championships	Free skating
7	Rhapsody on a Theme of Paganini	2010 World Junior Championships	Free skating
8	Romeo + Juliet	2011–12 Japan Championships	Free skating
9	Romeo + Juliet	2012 World Championships	Free skating
10	Notre-Dame de Paris	2012–13 Japan Championships	Free skating
11	Romeo and Juliet	2013–14 Japan Championships	Free skating
12	Romeo and Juliet	2014 Winter Olympics	Free skating
13	Romeo and Juliet	2014 World Championships	Free skating
14	"Sing, Sing, Sing"	2007 Medalists on Ice	Bonus videos
15	The Firebird	2007–08 Japan Junior Championships	Bonus videos
16	"Change"	2008 Medalists on Ice	Bonus videos
17	"Hana ni nare"	2012 Medalists on Ice	Bonus videos
18	Yuzuru Hanyu "Congratulations on your Olympic victory" parade (digest)		Bonus videos

=== Yuzuru Hanyu "Time of Evolution" ===
- Original title: 羽生結弦「進化の時」
- Language: Japanese
- Released: September 25, 2019
- Labels: Fuji TV, Pony Canyon
- Formats: DVD (Region 2), Blu-ray
- Runtime: 161 minutes (2 discs)

Yuzuru Hanyu "Time of Evolution" track list
No.	Program title	Event	Segment
1	Ballade No. 1 in G minor	2014–15 Grand Prix Final	Main videos
2	The Phantom of the Opera	2014–15 Grand Prix Final	Main videos
3	Ballade No. 1 in G minor	2014–15 Japan Championships	Main videos
4	The Phantom of the Opera	2014–15 Japan Championships	Main videos
5	Ballade No. 1 in G minor	2015 NHK Trophy	Main videos
6	Seimei	2015 NHK Trophy	Main videos
7	Ballade No. 1 in G minor	2015–16 Grand Prix Final	Main videos
8	Seimei	2015–16 Grand Prix Final	Main videos
9	Ballade No. 1 in G minor	2015–16 Japan Championships	Main videos
10	Seimei	2015–16 Japan Championships	Main videos
11	Hope and Legacy	2016 NHK Trophy	Main videos
12	Hope and Legacy	2017 World Championships	Main videos
13	Seimei	2017 Rostelecom Cup	Main videos
14	Ballade No. 1 in G minor	2018 Winter Olympics	Main videos
15	Seimei	2018 Winter Olympics	Main videos
16	"White Legend"	2011 Medalists on Ice	Bonus videos
17	"Requiem of Heaven and Earth"	2015 Medalists on Ice	Bonus videos
18	"Notte Stellata (The Swan)"	2018 Winter Olympics	Bonus videos
19	Yuzuru Hanyu "Congratulations on your second consecutive victory" parade (digest)		Bonus videos

=== Prologue ===
- Original title: プロローグ
- Language: Japanese
- Released: July 19, 2024
- Distributor: TV Asahi
- Formats: DVD (Region 2), Blu-ray
- Runtime: 110 minutes main performance, 30 minutes aprox. bonus videos (1 disc)

Prologue track list
No.	Program title	Segment
1	6-minute practice	Main performance
2	Seimei	Main performance
3	Change	Main performance
4	Otoñal	Main performance
5	Q&A	Main performance
6	Sing, Sing, Sing	Main performance
7	Pathetique (Étude in D-sharp minor, Op. 8, No. 12)	Main performance
8	Romeo + Juliet	Main performance
9	A Dream That Will End Someday	Main performance
10	Haru, Yo Koi	Main performance
11	Parisienne Walkways	Encore
12	Multi-angle footage (3 programs)	Bonus video
13	Backstage footage	Bonus video

=== Yuzuru Hanyu Ice Story 2023 “GIFT” at Tokyo Dome ===
- Original title:Yuzuru Hanyu Ice Story 2023 “GIFT” at Tokyo Dome
- Language: Japanese
- Released: August 20, 2024
- Distributor: TV Asahi
- Formats: DVD (Region 2), Blu-ray
- Runtime: 140 minutes main performance, 30 minutes aprox. bonus videos (1 disc)

GIFT track list
No.	Program title	Segment
1	The Firebird	Main performance
2	Hope and Legacy	Main performance
3	One Summer’s Day	Main performance
4	Hope and Legacy	Main performance
5	Ballad No. 1 in G minor	Main performance
6	Introduction and Rondo Capriccioso	Main performance
7	Let's Go Crazy	Main performance
8	Let Me Entertain You	Main performance
9	Ashura-chan	Main performance
10	The Phantom of the Opera	Main performance
11	A Dream That Will End Someday	Main performance
12	Notte Stellata (The Swan)	Main performance
13	Haru, Yo Koi	Encore
14	Seimei	Encore
15	Multi-angle footage (4 programs)	Bonus video
16	Special Documentary	Bonus video

=== 'Yuzuru Hanyu Ice Story 2nd “RE_PRAY” Tour ===
- Original title: Yuzuru Hanyu Ice Story 2nd “RE_PRAY” Tour
- Language: Japanese
- Release: January 23, 2026
- Distributor: TV Asahi
- Formats: DVD (all regions), Blu-ray (region free)
- Runtime: 144 minutes main performance, plus bonus videos (1 disc)
- Recording: April 7 and 9, 2024, Sekisui Heim Super Arena

RE_PRAY track list
No.	Program title	Segment
1	A Dream That Will End Someday (Original)	Main performance
2	Gate of Living	Main performance
3	Hope and Legacy	Main performance
4	Ashura-chan	Main performance
5	Megalovania	Main performance
6	Messengers to Destruction	Main performance
7	A Dream That Will End Someday;re (piano version)	Main performance
8	Requiem of Heaven and Earth	Main performance
9	One Summer’s Day	Main performance
10	Haru, Yo Koi	Main performance
11	Lufia 2 Medley	Ending
12	Let Me Entertain You	Encore
13	Introduction and Rondo Capriccioso	Encore
14	Seimei	Encore
15	Yuzuru Hanyu × MIKIKO Audio Commentary	Bonus video
