= Music of Spirited Away =

Music of the 2001 feature film

The music for Studio Ghibli's 2001 Japanese animated fantasy film Spirited Away, directed by Hayao Miyazaki, features a score composed by Joe Hisaishi and performed by the New Japan Philharmonic symphony orchestra. Hisaishi received critical acclaim and numerous accolades for his work in the film. An original soundtrack album that contains 20 tracks from the film score and one song was released in July 2001, whereas an image album that had five songs and five instrumentals, released three months before, in April 2001. Both of them were re-issued on a double disc vinyl LP in 2020.

== Background ==
Originally, the opening track "One Summer's Day" was an instrumental theme. Later, Hisaishi added lyrics to those tunes, and named the new version of the song "The Name of Life" (いのちの名前, "Inochi no Namae") which was performed by Ayaka Hirahara. It was not featured in the album.

The closing song, "Always With Me" (いつも何度でも, "Itsumo Nando Demo"; lit. 'Always, No Matter How Many Times') was composed and performed by Youmi Kimura, with lyrics by Wakako Kaku. The song was intended to be used for Rin the Chimney Painter (煙突描きのリン, Entotsu-kaki no Rin), an unproduced Miyazaki film.

== Reception ==
A review from Sputnikmusic rated the album 4.5 out of 5, opining that it is "nearly as perfect as the film it accompanies". Filmtracks.com wrote "Hisaishi's output for the animated genre has created a unique voice in the realm of children's music that is difficult to compare to any other film music composer. His airy and whimsical tone and almost Golden Age-style of melodic grace make his music instantly recognizable, and Spirited Away is no exception."

Karen Han of Polygon considered the title theme "One Summer's Day" to be "wistful, with intentionally discordant notes scattered throughout and a melody that ventures in and out of minor-key territory". She also observed the song's "eerie synthesizer sounds and strings" and "warm and shimmering" chords and concluded that it was "crucial to setting the tone for Spirited Away, which captures the bittersweetness in growing up and growing out of things, as well as establishing the thoughts of Chihiro herself." In Dazed, Thomas Hobbs considered "One Summer's Day" his personal favorite Hisaishi composition, stating that "a meandering piano melody makes it feel like you're flipping through a book of historic family photos on a reflective and sunny Sunday afternoon in a garden awash with purple tulips." He considered the opening theme to precisely match the film's ideas regarding freedom, hope, and death.

In a ranking of the ten best compositions by Hisaishi, Classic FM ranked "One Summer's Day" in seventh place: "A simple, melancholy piano melody on a bed of soft string chords reflects Chihiro's reluctance to leave her home and friends behind. The music builds to a richer texture with full, jazz-inflected piano chords, more orchestration, and a more optimistic mood as Chihiro's mother encourages her to view the move as an adventure."

== Track listings ==
=== Original soundtrack ===
Spirited Away Original Soundtrack

Soundtrack album by Joe Hisaishi
- Released: 11 July 2001
- Studios: Wonder Station; Sumida Triphony Hall
- Genres: Film score; orchestral
- Length: 59:54
- Language: Japanese
- Labels: Studio Ghibli; Milan
- Producer: Joe Hisaishi

Joe Hisaishi chronology
| Brother (2001) | Spirited Away (2001) | Quartet (2001) |

Spirited Away Original Soundtrack (千と千尋の神隠し サウンドトラック, Sen to Chihiro no Kamikakushi Saundotorakku) is the soundtrack to the film released on 11 July 2001 by Studio Ghibli Records and published by Tokuma Japan Communications. It featured 20 of Hisaishi's scores from the film and the end credits song "Always With Me". Ahead of the US release, Milan Records distributed the album on 10 September 2002.

All music is composed by Joe Hisaishi, except where listed.

Track listing (Note: The Japanese titles are noted in each track of the album)
| No. | Title | Lyrics | Composer | Length |
|---|---|---|---|---|
| 1. | "One Summer's Day" (あの夏へ, Ano natsu e) | | | 3:09 |
| 2. | "A Road to Somewhere" (とおり道, Tōri michi) | | | 2:07 |
| 3. | "The Empty Restaurant" (誰もいない料理店, Daremoinai ryōri-ten) | | | 3:15 |
| 4. | "Nighttime Coming" (夜来る,Yoru kuru) | | | 2:00 |
| 5. | "The Dragon Boy" (竜の少年, Ryū no shōnen) | | | 2:12 |
| 6. | "Sootballs" (ボイラー虫, Boirā mushi) | | | 2:33 |
| 7. | "Procession of Gods" (神さま達, Kamisama-tachi) | | | 3:00 |
| 8. | "Yubaba" (湯婆婆) | | | 3:30 |
| 9. | "Bathhouse Morning" (湯屋の朝, Yuya no asa) | | | 2:02 |
| 10. | "Day of the River" (あの日の川, Ano hinokawa) | | | 3:13 |
| 11. | "It's Hard Work" (仕事はつらいぜ, Shigoto wa tsurai ze) | | | 2:26 |
| 12. | "The Stink God" (おクサレ神, O kusare-shin) | | | 4:01 |
| 13. | "Sen's Courage" (千の勇気, Sen no yūki) | | | 2:45 |
| 14. | "The Bottomless Pit" (底なし穴, Sokonashi ana) | | | 1:18 |
| 15. | "Kaonashi (No Face)" (カオナシ) | | | 3:47 |
| 16. | "The Sixth Station" (6番目の駅, 6-Banme no eki) | | | 3:38 |
| 17. | "Yubaba's Panic" (湯婆婆狂乱, Yubaba kyōran) | | | 1:38 |
| 18. | "The House at Swamp Bottom" (沼の底の家, Numa no soko no ie) | | | 1:29 |
| 19. | "Reprise" (ふたたび, Futatabi) | | | 4:53 |
| 20. | "The Return" (帰る日, Kaeru hi) | | | 3:20 |
| 21. | "Always With Me" (いつも何度でも, Itsumo nando demo) | Wakako Kaku | Youmi Kimura | 3:35 |
| Total length: | | | | 59:51 |

=== Image album ===
Spirited Away Image Album

Soundtrack album by Joe Hisaishi
- Released: 4 April 2001
- Genre: Image album
- Length: 37:20
- Language: Japanese
- Label: Studio Ghibli
- Producer: Joe Hisaishi

Besides the original soundtrack, an image album titled Spirited Away Image Album (千と千尋の神隠し イメージアルバム, Sen to Chihiro no Kamikakushi Imēji Arubamu) accompanied the film's music. The 10-track album was released on 4 April 2001 through Studio Ghibli's music label.

Track listing
| No. | Title | Lyrics | Artist(s) | Length |
|---|---|---|---|---|
| 1. | "Day of the River" (あの日の川へ, Ano hinokawa e) | | Yamagata Yūka | 3:54 |
| 2. | "The Night Is Coming" (夜が来る, Yoru ga kuru) | | | 4:25 |
| 3. | "The Gods" (神々さま, Kamigami sama) | Joe Hisaishi | Sizzle Ohtaka | 3:55 |
| 4. | "The Bathhouse" (油屋, Aburaya) | Hayao Miyazaki | Tsunehiko Kamijō | 3:56 |
| 5. | "People In The Wonderland" (不思議の国の住人, Fushigi no kuni no jūnin) | | | 3:20 |
| 6. | "Lonely, Lonely" (さみしい さみしい, Samishī samishī) | Miyazaki | Hiroshi Kamayatsu | 3:41 |
| 7. | "Solitude" (ソリチュード, Sorichūdo) | | | 3:49 |
| 8. | "The Sea" (海, Umi) | | | 3:22 |
| 9. | "White Dragon" (白い竜, Shiroi ryū) | Miyazaki | Rikki | 3:33 |
| 10. | "Chihiro's Waltz" (千尋のワルツ, Chihiro no warutsu) | | | 3:20 |
| Total length: | | | | 37:20 |

== Accolades ==
| Award | Category | Recipient | Result |
|---|---|---|---|
| Annie Awards | Annie Award for Music in a Feature Production | Joe Hisaishi | Won |
| Chicago Film Critics Association | Best Original Score | Joe Hisaishi | Nominated |
| Japan Academy Film Prize | Best Song | Youmi Kimura – "Always With Me" (いつも何度でも, Itsumo nando demo) | Won |
| Japan Gold Disc Award | Animation Album of the Year | Joe Hisaishi | Won |
| Japan Record Awards | Best Song | Youmi Kimura – "Always With Me" (いつも何度でも, Itsumo nando demo) | Gold |
| Mainichi Film Awards | Best Music | Joe Hisaishi and Youmi Kimura | Won |
| Tokyo Anime Award | Best Music | Joe Hisaishi | Won |
| Tokyo International Anime Fair | Best Music (Theatrical Film) | Joe Hisaishi | Won |
| 29th Saturn Awards | Saturn Award for Best Music | Joe Hisaishi | Nominated |

== Personnel ==
Credits adapted from the liner notes of Spirited Away's original soundtrack.

- Kazumi Inaki – A&R
- Tomoko Okada – A&R
- Joe Hisaishi – composer, arranger, producer, conductor, orchestrator, piano
- Jodi Tack – design, layout
- Laetitia Bellon – design, layout
- Shohei Kaneko – vocal director
- Hiroyuki Akita – assistant engineer
- Shigeki Fujino – mastering engineer
- Shinichi Tanaka – recording engineer (orchestra)
- Masayoshi Okawa – recording engineer (score)
- Christopher Kimball – executive producer
- Emmanuel Chamboredon – executive producer
- Keith Walner – executive producer
- Wonder City Tokyo – artist management
- Jun Nagao – orchestrator
- Kazunori Miyake – orchestrator
- New Japan Philharmonic Orchestra – performer
- Masaki Sekijima – production manager
- Soichiro Ito – production manager
- Hiroshi Kuwabara – orchestra recording staff
- Masaya Yasue – orchestra recording staff
- Masamichi Ohashi – orchestra recording staff
- Shinya Tanaka – orchestra recording staff
- Hirokazu Fujita – orchestra recording staff
- Suminobu Hamada – orchestra recording staff
