= Children Untold =

2026 Japanese drama film

- Official theatrical release poster

Japanese name
- Kanji: わたしの知らない子どもたち
- Directed by: Miwa Nishikawa
- Written by: Miwa Nishikawa
- Screenplay by: Miwa Nishikawa
- Based on: Children Untold by Miwa Nishikawa
- Produced by: Daiju Koide; Taichi Ito
- Starring: Aoi Koyae; Fumi Nikaido; Ryota Bando; Yō Yoshida; Yutaka Takenouchi; Junichi Okada; Yūko Tanaka; Koji Yakusho
- Cinematography: Norimichi Kasamatsu
- Edited by: Tomomi Kikuchi
- Music by: Marihiko Hara
- Production company: Kii no Muneyuki
- Distributed by: K2 Pictures
- Release dates: 10 September 2026 (TIFF); 16 October 2026 (Japan)
- Running time: 150 minutes
- Country: Japan
- Language: Japanese

Children Untold (Japanese: わたしの知らない子どもたち) is a 2026 Japanese post-war drama film written and directed by Miwa Nishikawa. Based on her unpublished novel of same name, it's set in Tokyo during the final days and immediate aftermath of the Second World War. It follows a 12-year-old orphaned girl who disguises herself as a boy to survive the city's dangerous underworld, while her former teacher retraces her path in search of redemption.

The film opened the Platform section of the 2026 Toronto International Film Festival on 10 September 2026, competing for the Platform Prize. It was theatrically released in Japan by K2 Pictures on 16 October.

== Synopsis ==
In the charred ruins of 1945 Tokyo, during the final days and immediate aftermath of World War II, a young orphan 12-year-old daughter of musicians, to survive the harsh realities of the city's underworld, assumes the identity of a boy. Running parallel to her journey is that of her former teacher, who, haunted by guilt and struggling to survive herself, retraces the girl's footsteps in an attempt to uncover her fate.

== Cast ==
- Aoi Koyae as Kotoko Kayano
- Fumi Nikaido as Fumiko Sone
- Ryota Bando as Kyoichiro Morozumi
- Kaito Sakurai as Ritsuro Kayano
- Yukiya Kitamura as a detective
- Yō Yoshida
- Yuichiro Hayama
- Josuke Kobayashi
- Iwata Ryumon
- Shibuya Soraji
- Hinata Takeuchi
- Kotone Hanase as Hiroe
- Yutaka Takenouchi as Koichi Chino
- Junichi Okada as Toru Kikuzawa
- Yūko Tanaka as Kei Yamai
- Koji Yakusho as Jinbe Yamai

== Production ==
Miwa Nishikawa revealed that she thought about this project during the pandemic in 2020. Aoi Koyae plays the role of 12-year-old Kotoko, who was selected from around 500 people in an audition. It is produced by Daiju Koide and Taichi Ito, with K2 Pictures serving as production company. Norimichi Kasamatsu handled the cinematography, Tomomi Kikuchi edited the film, and the musical score was composed by Marihiko Hara.

== Release ==
Children Untold opened the Platform Competition at the 2026 Toronto International Film Festival on 10 September 2026.

On 14 May 2026, Italian sales agent Intramovies acquired worldwide rights to the film, giving it a wider theatrical release.

It was released theatrically in Japan on 16 October 2026 by K2 Pictures.

== Reception ==
=== Accolades ===
Award	Date of ceremony	Category	Recipient(s)	Result	Ref.
Toronto International Film Festival	20 September 2026	Platform Prize	Children Untold	Nominated	
Nikkan Sports Film Awards	27 December 2026	Best Film	Children Untold	Pending	
Nikkan Sports Film Awards	27 December 2026	Best Director	Miwa Nishikawa	Pending	
Nikkan Sports Film Awards	27 December 2026	Best Actress	Ami Koyae	Pending	
Nikkan Sports Film Awards	27 December 2026	Best Supporting Actress	Fumi Nikaido	Pending	
Nikkan Sports Film Awards	27 December 2026	Best Supporting Actress	Yūko Tanaka	Pending	
Nikkan Sports Film Awards	27 December 2026	Best Newcomer	Ami Koyae	Pending	
