= Marihiko Hara =

Japanese composer

Marihiko Hara 原摩利彦
- Born: August 14, 1983 (age 43); Osaka, Japan
- Genres: Film score; Electronic music; Ambient music; New Age; New Wave; Minimal
- Occupations: Composer; pianist; sound artist
- Instruments: Piano; Synthesizer; Keyboard
- Years active: 2000–present
- Website: https://www.marihikohara.com/

Marihiko Hara (原 摩利彦, Hara Marihiko; born August 14, 1983) is a Kyoto-based composer and sound artist whose work explores the subtle boundaries between sound, silence, memory, and space. His compositions blend field recordings, acoustic instruments, and electronics into quiet, immersive soundscapes.

Centered on the theme of strength within stillness, he creates music in various media, including piano-centered chamber music, field recordings, sound works using electronic sounds, stage performances, contemporary art, and film. He is a member of the Kyoto-based artist collective Dumb Type.

== Biography ==
Marihiko took piano lessons as a child, but he was a terrible student and quit around the age of 10. He didn't start playing the piano again until he was in junior high school. At age 13, he attended a concert by Ryuichi Sakamoto's trio at Festival Hall in Osaka in 1996, as part of the tour for the album "1996," where Jaques Morelenbaum and Everton Nelson performed together. He was so deeply impacted by the experience that it inspired him to become a composer. He began taking private composition lessons toward the end of his third year of junior high school and continued for three years. Although he excelled in harmony, he was not very skilled at piano performance or solfège. He initially aimed to attend music school but ultimately decided against going to a music university in Tokyo. He eventually enrolled and graduated from the Faculty of Education, Kyoto University. At university, he bought a Mac and started what's called DTM (Desktop Music). He had been composing since around junior high school, started using samplers, synthesizers and sequencers around high school, and then switched to computers when he entered university.

He withdrew from the Master's program in the Graduate School of Education, Kyoto University.

He has a younger brother, Rurihiko Hara, who is a researcher of Japanese gardens and Noh theater.

Hara composed a music for the opening ceremony at the 2020 Olympic Games. In 2020 he won two awards at the Music Awards Japan for the music of the film Kokuo. In 2026 Hara also composed the music for the show Realive held by two-times Olympic champion Yuzuru Hanyu.

== Works ==
=== Film ===
Year	Title	Notes	Ref.
2022	The Wandering Moon	Directed by Lee Sang-il	
2023	Do Unto Others	Directed by Tetsu Maeda	
2025	On Summer Sand	Directed by Shinya Tamada	
2025	Kokuho	Directed by Lee Sang-il	
2026	Children Untold	Directed by Miwa Nishikawa	

=== Television ===
Year	Title	Notes	Ref.
2023	Koun na Hito	Directed by Masae Ichiki	
2024	Deaf Voice	Directed by Kazutaka Watanabe	

=== Documentary Film ===
Year	Title	Notes	Ref.
2019	Agniyogana	Co-music with Ryuichi Sakamoto	
2020	Being	Directed by Moe Wada	
2023	SHUNGA	Directed by Junko Hirata	
2024	CACAO y los Japoneses	Directed by Moe Wada	
2024	Dearest Viet	Directed by Kohei Kawabata	
2025	Guardians of the Harvest	Directed by Riko Hiro	

=== Short Film ===
Year	Title	Notes	Ref.
2021	TRINITY	Directed by Yukihiko Tsutsumi	
2024	A Tiny Story for TRINITY LES POCHES	Directed by Yuri Kanchiku	

=== Animation Film ===
Year	Title	Notes	Ref.
2015	COLUMBOS	Directed by KAWAI + OKAMURA	
2019	MOOD HALL	Directed by KAWAI + OKAMURA	

=== Theatre/Performance ===
Year	Title	Notes	Ref.
2021	MOMENT OF REMEMBRANCE	Tokyo Olympics 2020 Opening Ceremony, performance by Mirai Moriyama	
2024	JUNGLE	Korea National Contemporary Dance Company	
2026	Yuzuru Hanyu REALIVE an ICE STORY project	Composed 10 songs for the 2nd half of the show, "Prequel: before the WHITE" Setlist: Video 1: A Quiet Chaos; M1: Before the WHITE; M2: Magenta Paradox; Video 2: Realive Interlude; M3: Tiny Yellow; Video 3: Awaking; M4: Still in Motion; M5: Chroma; Ending credits: Hiss Coda; M6: Curtain Call	

== Awards ==
- Recipient of the Kyoto Prefecture Cultural Award Encouragement Prize for fiscal year 2021
- Kyoto City New Artist Award, 2025
- For the film Kokuho
  - 67th Japan Record Awards - Special Award Winner (Broadcast on TBS Television and TBS Radio on December 30, 2025)
  - Winner of the Music Award at the 80th Mainichi Film Awards
  - The 49th Japan Academy Film Prize
    - Winner of the Best Music Award
    - Winner of the Best Theme Song ("Luminance" by Marihiko Hara feat. Satoru Iguchi)
  - Osaka Cinema Festival 2026 Music Award Winner

== Discography ==
=== Solo Album ===
Year	Title	Ref.
2011	Credo	
2013	Flora	
2017	Landscape in Portrait	
2020	PASSION	

=== EP ===
Year	Title	Ref.
2008	unrhymed	
2017	Habit	
2017	Radix	
2021	3 States for TRANSDUCER	
2021	Marihiko Hara Selected Live Recordings 2018-2019	
2021	Resonant I	
2021	Resonant II	
2021	ALL PEOPLE IS NICE	
2024	Blue	

=== Soundtrack ===
Year	Title	Ref.
2021	FAKESPEARE Original Soundtrack	
2022	Wandering Original Soundtrack	
2022	Sol Torainoashioto Original Soundtrack	
2023	Do Unto Others Original Soundtrack	
2023	NHK TV Show Koun na Hito Original Soundtrack	
2023	NODA・MAP; Usagi, Nami wo Hashiru Original Soundtrack	
2024	NHK TV Show Deaf Voice Original Soundtrack	
2024	CACAO y los Japoneses Original Soundtrack	
2024	SHUNGA Original Soundtrack	
2024	UP AND DOWN; Directed by Kodue Hibino; Music for Children	
2024	DEAREST VIET Original Soundtrack	
2024	NODA・MAP; Love in Action Original Soundtrack	
2025	KOKUHO Original Soundtrack	
