= Youmi Kimura =

Japanese singer and lyre performer

Youmi Kimura 木村 弓
- Origin: Osaka Prefecture, Japan
- Genres: J-pop
- Occupation: Musician
- Instruments: Vocals, lyre
- Years active: 1988–present
- Website: youmi-kimura.com

Youmi Kimura (Japanese: 木村 弓, Hepburn: Kimura Yumi) is a Japanese singer and lyre performer. She is best known for her compositions on the soundtracks of Studio Ghibli films.

== Career ==
Kimura was born in Osaka Prefecture and attended Kobe College. She studied the piano at California State University, Fresno. After returning to Japan, she began performing as a vocalist with lyre accompaniment in 1988.

Taking inspiration from the films of Hayao Miyazaki, Kimura recorded the song "Always With Me". Miyazaki favored the song, and planned to use it in his project "Rin the Chimney Painter ", which was ultimately canceled. It was eventually used as the closing theme of Spirited Away (2001). She reflected on Spirited Away receiving the Academy Award for Best Animated Feature in 2003, saying "the view of the world Miyazaki animation impressed on people's hearts transcends culture and lifestyle."

Kimura wrote the song "Promise of the World", which was rearranged and featured as the closing theme of another of Miyazaki's films, Howl's Moving Castle (2004).

== Accolades ==
"Always With Me" placed 43rd on the 2001 annual singles chart in Japan, with an estimated 404,000 CD sales. Along with Joe Hisaishi, Kimura was awarded the Music Award at the 56th Mainichi Film Awards for their work on the soundtrack of Spirited Away. She also received a Special Award from the Association at the 25th Japan Academy Film Prize.

In 2005, Kimura was presented with the Los Angeles Film Critics Association Award for Best Music along with Joe Hisaishi for their work on Howl's Moving Castle.
