= Dreams on Ice =

Annual ice show

Dreams on Ice ドリーム・オン・アイス
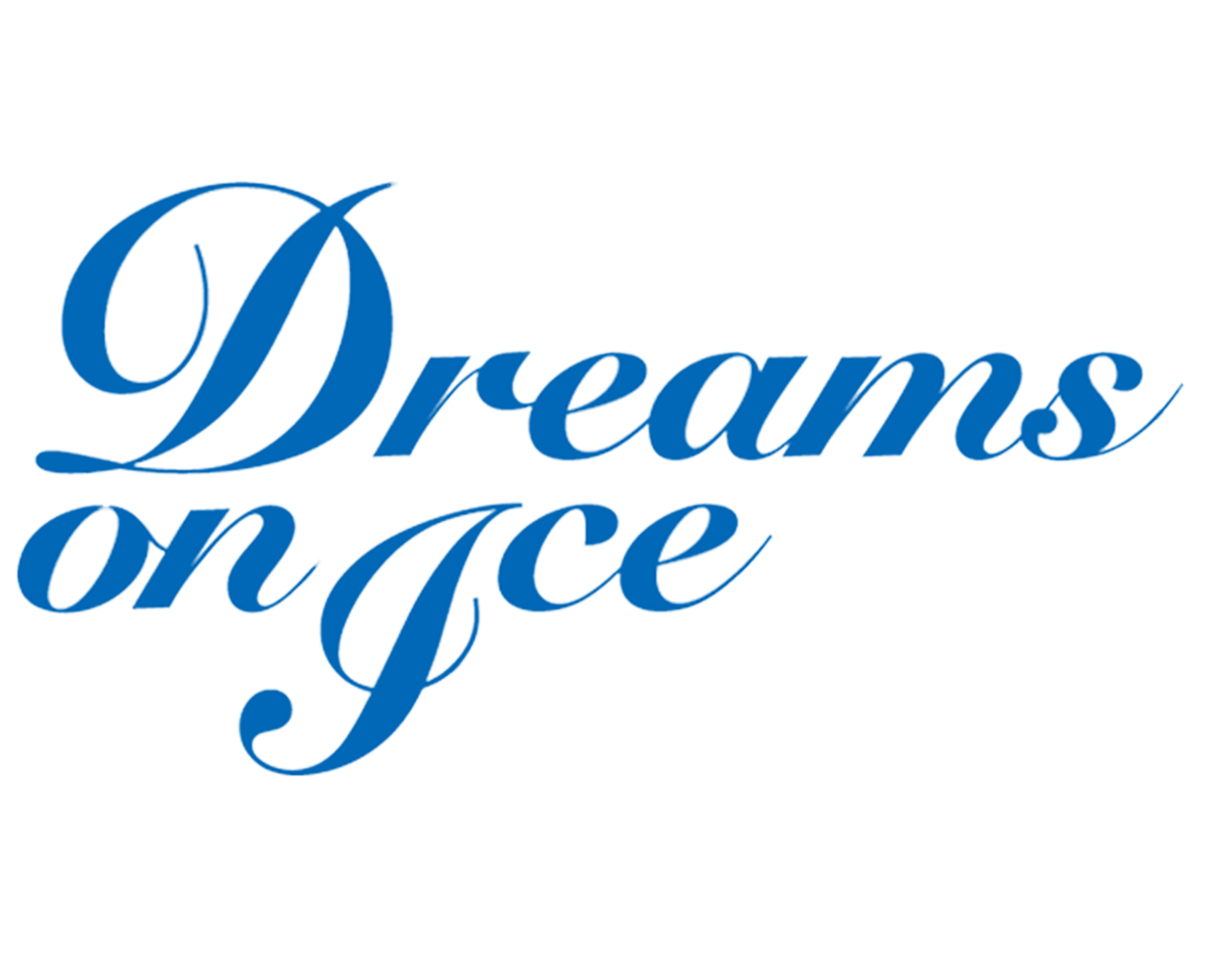

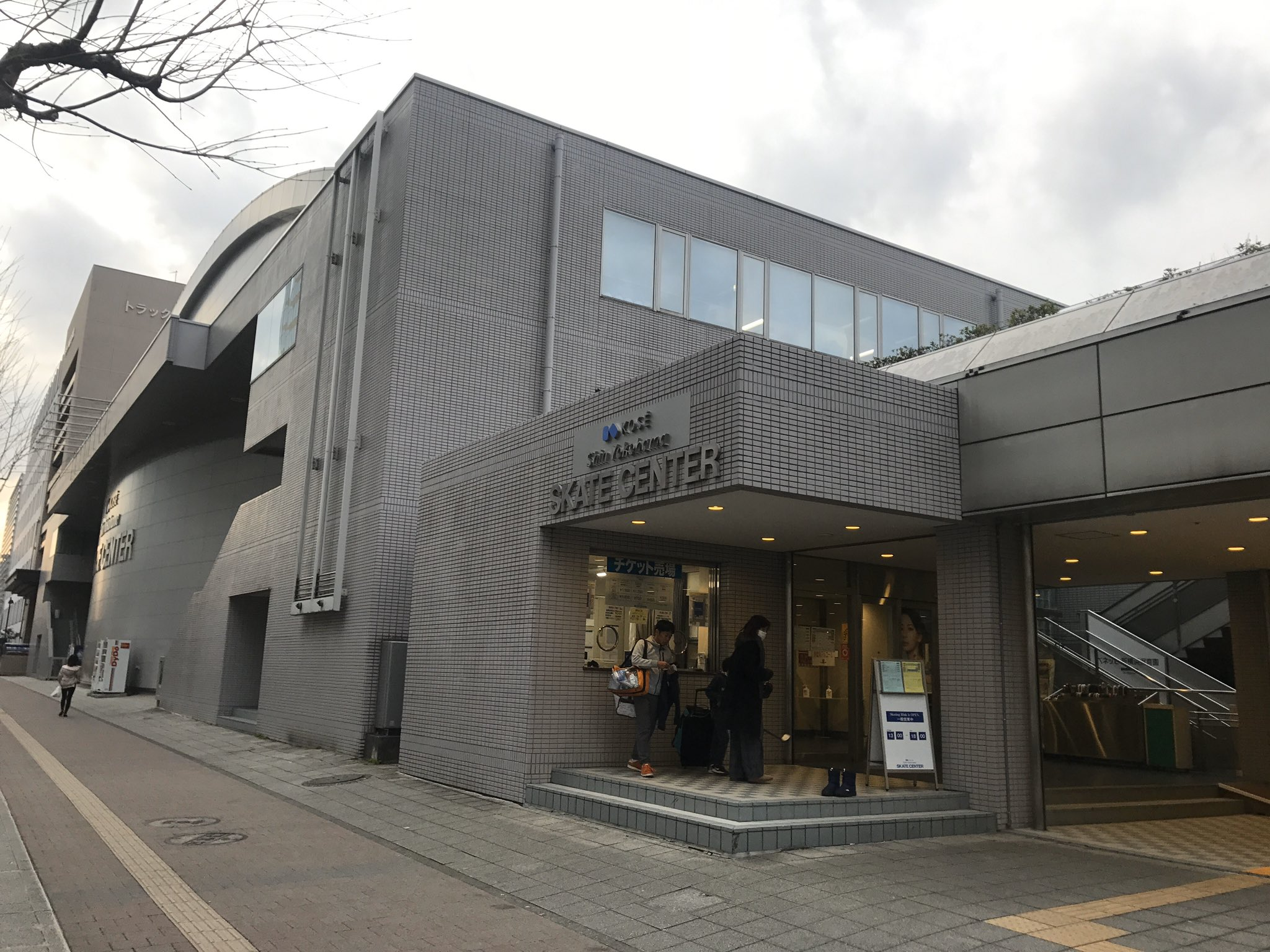
- KOSÉ Shin Yokohama Skate Center (KOSÉ新横浜スケートセンター) located in Yokohama, Kanagawa, Japan
- Status: Ongoing
- Genre: Ice show
- Frequency: Annual
- Country: Japan
- Inaugurated: 2004
- Most recent: 2025
- Major events: Skating exhibitions
- Website: www.onice.jp

Dreams on Ice (ドリーム・オン・アイス) is an annual ice show produced by CIC Co., Ltd. It takes place at KOSÉ Shin-Yokohama Skate Center at the end of June and early July at the conclusion of the figure skating season, featuring a cast of Japanese senior and junior skaters with international skaters from overseas. Dreams on Ice is different from other shows due to the Japanese Skating Federation's involvement in the selection of national skaters, and international skaters are only invited as guests.

== History ==
Dreams on Ice was founded by Kikuo Makabe, representative director of CIC Co., Ltd. in 2004. Around this period, Akie Murakushi finished first at the 2003 Grand Prix Final, Yukina Ota won the 2004 Four Continents Championships, Miki Ando became the 2004 Junior World Champion, and Shizuka Awakawa stood atop the podium at the 2004 World Championships. The ultimate goal, however, was an Olympic gold medal for Japan, and Makabe wanted the name of his show to reflect those dreams.

The inaugural Dreams on Ice shows were aptly called "Dreams on Ice 2004 Road to Torino" and took place on June 26–27, 2004, with a cast that included 2002 Olympic Men's Champion Alexei Yagudin, 2002 Olympic Ice Dance Champions Marina Anissina and Gwendal Peizerat, newly crowned World Champion Awakawa, who would later go on to win Japan's first gold medal at the 2006 Winter Olympics, and European Champion Brian Joubert.

== Concept ==
Makabe initially wanted a show starring international medalists from the figure skating season that was coming to a close but when he pitched the project to the Japanese Skating Federation, they wanted to include eligible national senior and junior level skaters to help them improve their presentation by performing in front of an audience. Dreams on Ice became a showcase of top Japanese skaters who were selected based on competition results. Accordingly, receiving an invitation to skate in the show meant being recognized as a top skater in Japan.

As the show is held at the end of the season, it also serves as a kick-off event for the new season. Most skaters perform new exhibition programs, and others want to test their new short programs in front an audience ahead of the upcoming season.

== Audience and accessibility ==
Shows have been broadcast on terrestrial channels such as TBS Television and satellite channels in the past. In 2022, two shows were televised live on the subscription channel CS TBS 2.

== Cast ==
Past skaters performing at Dreams on Ice include:

- (Japan) Miki Ando
- (Japan) Shizuka Arakawa
- (Japan) Mone Chiba
- (Japan) Yuzuru Hanyu
- (Japan) Wakabe Higuchi
- (Japan) Marin Honda
- (Japan) Rika Hongo
- (Japan) Yuma Kagiyama
- (Japan) Takeru Amine Kataise
- (Japan) Rika Kihira
- (Japan) Tatsuki Machida
- (Japan) Mai Mihara
- (Japan) Kao Miura
- (Japan) Ami Nakai
- (Japan) Nobunari Oda
- (Japan) Kaori Sakamoto
- (Japan) Shun Sato
- (Japan) Mao Shimada
- (Japan) Akiko Suzuki
- (Japan) Daisuke Takahashi
- (Japan) Keiji Tanaka
- (Japan) Kazuki Tomono
- (Japan) Rena Uezono
- (Japan) Shoma Uno
- (Japan) Rinka Wantanabe
- (Japan) Sota Yamamoto
- (Japan) Hana Yoshida
- (Japan) Nozomu Yoshioka

=== Guest skaters ===
Since the show's inception, international guest skaters invited to the show include:

==== Men's singles ====
- (South Korea) Cha Jun-hwan
- (United States) Nathan Chen
- (Spain) Javier Fernandez
- (France) Brian Joubert
- (Switzerland) Stephane Lambiel
- (United States) Ilia Malinin
- (Russia) Evgeni Plushenko
- (United States) Kevin Reynolds
- (United States) Johnny Weir
- (Russia) Alexei Yagudin

==== Women's singles ====
- (Belgium) Loena Hendrickx
- (South Korea) Yuna Kim
- (Russia) Aliona Kostornaia
- (South Korea) Lee Hae-in
- (Russia) Evgenia Medvedeva
- (Russia) Elena Radionova
- (Russia) Anna Shcherbakova
- (Russia) Maria Sotskova
- (Russia) Alexandra Trusova

==== Pairs ====
- (Canada) Meagan Duhamel / Eric Radford
- (France) Vanessa James / Morgan Cipres
- (Germany) Aljona Savchenko / Bruno Massot
- (Russia) Tatyana Volosozhar / Maxim Trankov

==== Ice dance ====
- (France) Marina Anissina / Gwendal Peizerat
- (France) Nathalie Pechalat / Fabian Bourzat
- (Canada) Tessa Virtue / Scott Moir
