= List of Korea University people =

The list of Korea University people includes notable alumni, faculty, and administrators affiliated with Korea University in Seoul, South Korea.

== Business ==
- Chung Mong-won (BBA 1979) – CEO of Halla Group and Mando Corporation
- Lee Jay-hyun, chairman of CJ Group
- Shin Dong-won, chairman and CEO of Nongshim
- Chung Eui-sun (BBA 1993) - Chairman of Hyundai Motor Group
- Park Hyeon-joo (BBA 1983 ) - Founder of Mirae Asset Financial Group
- Chey Tae-won (BS 1982) - Chairman of SK Group

== Law and politics ==
=== Presidents ===
- Lee Myung Bak: 10th president of South Korea; former mayor of Seoul; former President of Hyundai Group

=== Prime Ministers ===
- Heo Jeong: former acting prime minister during the First Republic of Korea interim government

=== Other political figures and activists ===
- Oh Se Hoon: former mayor of Seoul
- Sukhee Kang: current mayor of Irvine, California
- Yoon Chang-jung: former spokesman of Blue House.

== Literature ==
- Kim Hoon: A Korean novelist
- Park Hyoung-su: Korean author

== Entertainment ==
- Alexander Lee: Singer (U-Kiss)
- Bae Jong-ok: Actress
- Choi Song-hyun: Actress
- Chung Ji-young: Director
- Esther K. Chae: Korean-American actress
- Eugene: Actress and singer (S.E.S.)
- Hyun Young: entertainer
- Josh Carrott: Youtuber
- Jung Ryeo-won: Actress and singer (Chakra)
- Kim Ah-joong: Actress
- Kim Greem: Singer
- Kim Soo-hyun: Writer
- Kim Soo-mi: Actress
- Kim Yong-rim: Actress
- Lee Beom-soo: Actor and co-CEO of Celltrion Entertainment
- Lee Hoon: Actor
- Lee In-hye: Actress
- Lee Jae-ryong: Actor
- Lee Je-hoon: Actor
- Lee Mi-sook: Actress
- Lee Sang-woo: Actor
- Lee Se-eun: Actress
- Lee Young-ha: Actor
- Oh Dae-gyu: Actor
- Ok Taec-yeon: Actor and singer (2PM)
- Park Hye-su: Actress and singer
- Park Ji-sun: Gagwoman
- Park Sang-wook: Actor
- Sam Hammington: Actor
- Soy Kim: Singer (T.T.Ma and Raspberry Field)
- Sung Si-kyung: Singer
- Yeo Woon-kay: Actress
- Yoon Je-kyoon: Director

== Sports ==
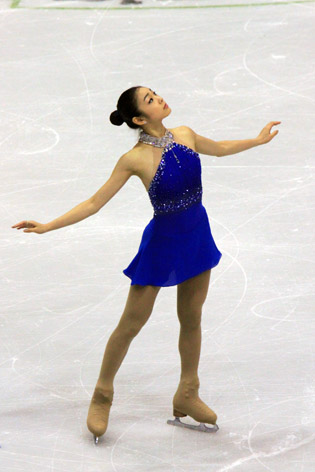
Yuna Kim (B.S., Physical Education) 2010 Winter Olympic gold medalist

- Hwang Young-Cho: Gold medalist in marathon, Summer Olympics in Barcelona (1992)
- Hong Myung-bo: FIFA World Cup 2002 Bronze Ball winner; the first Asian player to play in four consecutive World Cup finals tournaments
- Park Joo Young: current player at AS Monaco
- Cha Bum-Kun: Retired footballer, MVP of the Bundesliga in 85~86 season, be awarded as Asia's Player of the Century by the International Federation of Football History and Statistics
- Yuna Kim: 2009 World Figure Skating Champion, 2013 World Figure Skating Champion, 2010 Olympic Figure Skating Champion, and 2014 Olympic Figure Skating Silver Medalist.
- Kim Gil-li: a South Korean short track speed skater, and double Olympic champion. At the 2026 Winter Olympics, she won gold medals in both the 1500 meters and the 3000 meter relay, as well as a bronze medal in the 1000 meters.
- Jang Mi-Ran: 2008 Beijing Olympics gold medalist of weight-lifting
- Sun Dong-yeol: current head coach of Samsung Lions; former baseball pitcher with the most MVP in Korea baseball history
- Sohn Kee-Chung: The first medal-winning Korean Olympian. 1936 Berlin Olympics marathon gold medalist
- Choi Hee-seop: current Kia Tigers player. former MLB player for the Chicago Cubs, Florida Marlins, and the Los Angeles Dodgers
- Kim Dong-Sung: a South Korean short track speed skater, who won two medals at the 1998 Winter Olympics and has been the two-time champion at the World Short Track Speed Skating Championships (1997, 2002).
- Seo Jung-Won: Retired National team footballer (capped 87 games), player of the year (Jahreswertung aller Spieler) of the 2005–2006 season in the Austrian Bundesliga
- Cha Jun-hwan: a South Korean figure skater. He is the 2023 World silver medalist, a four-time the Four continents medalist (gold in 2022, silver in 2025 and 2026, and bronze in 2024). And He is also 2025 Asian Winter Games Cahmpion.

== Academics ==
=== College founders and presidents ===
- Kim Jung-bae: former President of Korea University; Founder and Chairman, Goguryeo Research Society (Goguryeo Yeongudan); Professor Emeritus, Korea University Department of History; Ancient Historian.*

=== Professors and scholars ===
- Do-ol (Young-Oak Kim): Internationally renowned philosopher.

== Faculty ==
- Park Gil Sung: leading sociology professor in Korea
