= TTMA =

TTMA may refer to:

- T.T.Ma, a South Korean girl band
- Texas Talent Musicians Association (TTMA), awarders of the Tejano Music Awards
