= The Ice (show) =

Japanese ice show

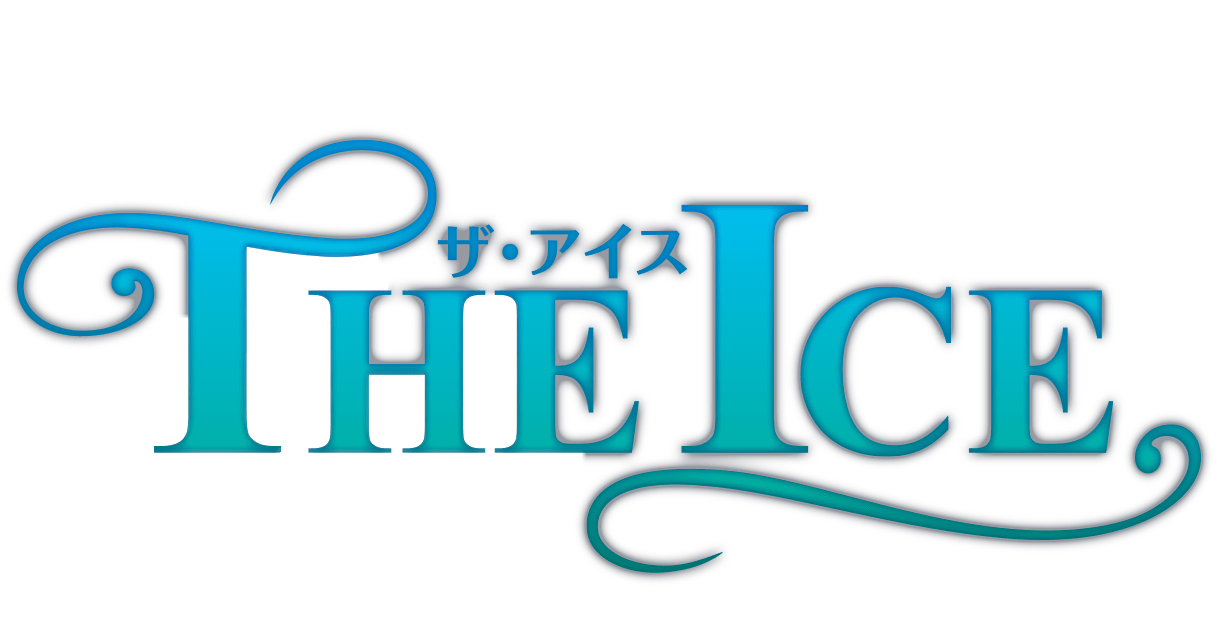
- Status: Ongoing
- Genre: Ice show
- Frequency: Annual
- Country: Japan
- Inaugurated: 2007
- Most recent: 2023
- Major events: Skating exhibitions
- Website: fs-theice.com

The Ice (ザ・アイス) is an annual touring ice show in Japan held over the summer at the end of July and early August with a cast of national top skaters from Japan and around the world. The show includes a variety of group numbers, collaborations between top singles skaters, and dance battles.

== History ==
Originally labeled a midsummer ice festival, The Ice debuted in Aichi Prefecture in 2007, featuring Mao Asada and Mai Asada. In the early years, the show was sponsored by Olympus from 2007 to 2010. Lotte took over the title sponsorship from 2011. After the "Great East Japan Earthquake" in 2011, the shows in Osaka and Hachinoe in 2011, and the show in Nikko in 2012 were charity performances benefitting the recovery effort. In 2020 and 2021, the tour was canceled as a result of the ongoing COVID-19 pandemic. It resumed in 2022.

== Concept ==
The Ice follows a variety show format with group numbers, special collaborations between top skaters that don't usually team up, dance battles, and other game show elements. The 2022 and 2023 editions included duets featuring two-time world champion Shoma Uno and Olympic champion Nathan Chen set to music from The Mission by Ennio Morricone and "On the Nature of Daylight" by Max Richter respectively. The show introduced off-ice dance performances for the first time in 2023 with Kevin Aymoz, Daisuke Takahashi, Cha Jun-hwan and Ilia Malinin.

== Attendance and accessibility ==
The tour attracts up to 30,000 spectators on an annual basis, and ticket prices ranged from 3,000 yen to 29,000 yen for the shows in Osaka in 2023 The shows have since 2007 been televised on local terrestrial channels and nationwide on satellite channels by Chukyo TV and Nippon Television. In 2023, The Ice stopped in Aichi, Nikko, Osaka and Morioka and all 12 shows were streamed live on four different subscription channels.

== Cast ==
The skaters performing in The Ice since its inception in 2007 include:

=== Men's singles ===
- (Canada) Jeffrey Buttle (2007–2017)
- (Japan) Takahiko Kozuka (2007–2015, 2017)
- (Switzerland) Stéphane Lambiel (2007)
- (Japan) Daisuke Takahashi (2007, 2016–2017)
- (United States) Evan Lysacek (2008–2009)
- (Russia) Alexei Yagudin (2008)
- (Japan) Takahito Mura (2009–2018)
- (United States) Adam Rippon (2009–2011, 2015–2016)
- (Kazakhstan) Denis Ten (2009)
- (France) Florent Amodio (2010–2011, 2016)
- (Russia) Evgeni Plushenko (2010)
- (Japan) Yuzuru Hanyu (2011–2012)
- (United States) Jeremy Abbott (2012–2015)
- (Spain) Javier Fernández (2012–2013)
- (Russia) Maxim Kovtun (2013–2015)
- (Canada) Kevin Reynolds (2013)
- (Canada) Patrick Chan (2014–2016)
- (Uzbekistan) Misha Ge (2015)
- (Japan) Nobunari Oda (2015–2018)
- (United States) Jason Brown (2016, 2022–2023)
- (Japan) Shoma Uno (2016–2024)
- (Russia) Dmitri Aliev (2018)
- (United States) Nathan Chen (2018–2019, 2022–2023)
- (China) Boyang Jin (2018–2019)
- (Japan) Kazuki Tomono (2018, 2021–2023)
- (Russia) Sergei Voronov (2018)
- (United States) Tomoki Hiwatashi (2019)
- (Russia) Mikhail Kolyada (2019)
- (France) Romain Ponsart (2019)
- (United States) Vincent Zhou (2019, 2022)
- (Japan) Yuma Kagiyama (2021)
- (Japan) Sena Miyake (2021)
- (Japan) Shun Sato (2021)
- (Japan) Keiji Tanaka (2021)
- (Japan) Sota Yamamoto (2021)
- (France) Kevin Aymoz (2022–2024)
- (South Korea) Junhwan Cha (2022–2024)
- (Italy) Daniel Grassl (2022)
- (United States) Ilia Malinin (2022–2024)
- (Italy) Matteo Rizzo (2022)
- (Canada) Keegan Messing (2023)
- (France) Adam Siao Him Fa (2023)
- (Japan) Kao Miura (2024)
- (Estonia) Aleksandr Selevko (2024)
- (Latvia) Deniss Vasiļjevs (2024)
- (Kazakhstan) Mikhail Shaidorov (2024)
- (Georgia (country)) Nika Egadze (2024)
- (United States) Jean-Luc Baker (2024)

=== Women's singles ===
- (Japan) Miki Ando (2007–2009)
- (Japan) Mai Asada (2007–2012, 2016–2017)
- (Japan) Mao Asada (2007–2017)
- (United States) Mirai Nagasu (2007–2008, 2011–2013, 2016–2018)
- (Japan) Aki Sawada (2007)
- (Japan) Miki Sone (2007–2009)
- (Japan) Nana Takeda (2007)
- (United States) Sasha Cohen (2008)
- (Japan) Yukari Nakano (2008)
- (Japan) Akiko Suzuki (2008–2010, 2015, 2017)
- (Japan) Kanako Murakami (2009–2017)
- (Japan) Rumi Suizu (2009)
- (Georgia (country)) Elene Gedevanishvili (2010)
- (Canada) Joanie Rochette (2010–2011, 2015–2016)
- (United States) Alissa Czisny (2011)
- (Russia) Alena Leonova (2012)
- (Russia) Adelina Sotnikova (2012–2015, 2017)
- (United States) Gracie Gold (2013–2014)
- (Japan) Satoko Miyahara (2013–2018, 2021–2022, 2024)
- (France) Maé-Bérénice Méité (2014)
- (Italy) Carolina Kostner (2015–2016)
- (United States) Ashley Wagner (2015)
- (United States) Mariah Bell (2018–2021)
- (Canada) Gabrielle Daleman (2018)
- (Japan) Marin Honda (2018–2022)
- (Japan) Mai Mihara (2018, 2021–2023)
- (Japan) Kaori Sakamoto (2018–2023)
- (Russia) Alina Zagitova (2018–2019)
- (Japan) Miyu Honda (2019)
- (Japan) Rika Kihira (2019–2021)
- (Japan) Wakaba Higuchi (2021)
- (Japan) Rika Hongo (2021)
- (Japan) Mana Kawabe (2021)
- (Japan) Rino Matsuike (2021)
- (Japan) Mako Yamashita (2021)
- (Japan) Yuhana Yokoi (2021)
- (United States) Alysa Liu (2022)
- (Belgium) Loena Hendrickx (2023)

=== Pairs ===
- (United States) Kyoko Ina / John Zimmerman (2007)
- (China) Shen Xue / Zhao Hongbo (2007, 2010)
- (China) Zhang Dan / Zhang Hao (2008)
- (China) Pang Qing / Tong Jian (2009, 2011, 2015, 2017)
- (Japan) Narumi Takahashi / Mervin Tran (2011–2012)
- (Japan) Narumi Takahashi / Ryuichi Kihara (2013–2014)
- (United States) Tarah Kayne / Daniel O'Shea (2016)
- (France) Vanessa James / Morgan Cipres (2018)
- (Japan) Riku Miura / Ryuichi Kihara (2022–2023)
- (United States) Emily Chan / Spencer Akira Howe (2024)

=== Ice dance ===
- (United Kingdom) Sinead Kerr / John Kerr (2008–2011)
- (United States) Tanith Belbin White / Benjamin Agosto (2009)
- (United States) Meryl Davis / Charlie White (2011–2012, 2014)
- (United States) Maya Shibutani / Alex Shibutani (2012–2014)
- (Canada) Kaitlyn Weaver / Andrew Poje (2013, 2015, 2017)
- (United States) Madison Hubbell / Zachary Donohue (2016)
- (France) Gabriella Papadakis / Guillaume Cizeron (2018–2019, 2023-2024)
- (Japan) Misato Komatsubara / Tim Koleto (2019)
- (United States) Madison Chock / Evan Bates (2022–2024)
- (Japan) Kana Muramoto / Daisuke Takahashi (2023)
