= Miki Sone =

Japanese figure skater

Miki Sone (曾根美樹, Sone Miki; born May 8, 1986) is a former Japanese figure skater. She is known for her take on 101 Dalmatians and her Ooku (大奥) exhibition. Sone participated in the Japanese touring show The Ice for three years in the Aughts before retiring.

== Early life and family ==
Born in Aichi Prefecture, Sone enrolled in the Chukyo University School of Physical Education and joined the skating club there. Her father is actor Harumi Sone, and her brother is actor Yuta Sone.

== Career ==
Sone started skating at age six. She moved up to the junior class in the 1999–2000 season and competed in the All Japan Junior Championships four times; she competed in women's singles.

Sone moved to the senior class in the 2004–2005 season and competed in the All Japan Championships (全日本選手権) for five consecutive seasons. Her highest ranking was 14th place at the 74th All Japan Championships in the 2005–2006 season.

Although she has not competed in international competitions, Sone has outstanding performance skills and self-production abilities, and has attracted attention with her unique exhibitions such as 101 Dalmatians and Ooku (大奥). She participated in the touring show The Ice every year from 2007 to 2009.

She retired from competitive skating at the end of the 2008–2009 season in March 2009.

== Achievements ==
Tournament/Year	1999–00	2000–01	2001–02	2002–03	2003–04	2004–05	2005–06	2006–07	2007–08
All Japan Championships					16	17	14	15	21
All Japan Junior Championships	13	20	23	25					

== Program ==
シーズン	SP	FS	EX
2007–2008			大奥
2006–2007	Sarabande 作曲：George Frideric Handel	Salome	101 Dalmatians
2005–2006			Phantom of the Opera
