= Raspberry Field =

South Korean musical duo

Raspberry Field 라즈베리필드
- Origin: Seoul, South Korea
- Genres: Folk, neofolk, indie
- Instrument: Guitar
- Years active: 2010–present
- Label: Cho Ah Entertainment
- Members: Soy; Jang Jun Seon
- Website: Raspberry Field Official site

Raspberry Field (Hangul: 라즈베리필드) is a South Korean indie duo formed in 2007. The duo debuted in the year 2010 with a single entitled Saturday Afternoon (토요일 오후에). The group consists of Soy (Vocals & Guitar) and Jang Jun Seon (Guitar).

== History ==
Soy was previously a member of the girl group T.T.Ma before she formed an indie duo along with Jang Jun Seon. The acoustic version of the song Wanna Be Loved was originally from T.T.Ma and was included as a bonus track on Raspberry Field's first single.

Raspberry Field initially appeared in various clubs in the Hong Ik University area and other various music festivals, particularly in the Pentaport Concert. The name of the duo was created because of their music that was compared to a raspberry. According to Soy, their songs are about the double-sidedness of life, as it offers both sweet and bitter moments.

Their single Saturday Afternoon was featured in the commercial of Etude, a cosmetic brand in South Korea. The lyrics and music of the song was composed by Soy herself.

Although all their singles were done through Cho Ah Entertainment, their latest album was produced through Macaroon Company and distributed in the United States by Kingpin Entertainment

== Members ==
=== Soy ===
Soy (born Kim So Yeon (김소연) on 1980 November 24) debuted in 1999 as a member of the group T.T.Ma. She has an older sister who go with the stage name Hey (해이). She is a graduate of Korea University. She has also acted in various films and dramas since 2004 before debuting as a member of Raspberry Field in 2010. She is in charge of the vocals and occasionally on guitar.

=== Jang Jun Seon ===
Jang Jun Seon (장준선) was born on July 22, 1980. He is in charge of the guitar.

== Discography ==
=== Singles ===
Title	Album Information	Track listing
Saturday Afternoon (토요일 오후에)	Format: CD; Release Date: July 16, 2010; Language: Korean, English; Record Label: Cho Ah Entertainment	Track listing: 1. Saturday Afternoon (토요일 오후에); 2. 3月 (Feat. 조규찬); 3. Wanna Be Loved (bonus track); 4. Saturday Afternoon (토요일 오후에) Instrumental
Have You Seen...? (본 적 있나요...?)	Format: CD; Release Date: October 21, 2010; Language: Korean, English; Record Label: Cho Ah Entertainment	Track listing: 1. Have You Seen...? (본 적 있나요...?); 2. 호밀밭의 파수꾼 (Feat. 강민국); 3. Perfect Reason (2008 Demo Version); 4. Have You Seen...? (본 적 있나요...?) Instrumental
You Know, (있잖아,)	Format: CD; Release Date: July 5, 2011; Language: Korean, English; Record Label: Cho Ah Entertainment	Track listing: 1. You Know, (있잖아,) Ft. Kim Young Woo of Sweet Sorrow; 2. She Was Right

=== Albums ===
Title	Album Information	Track listing
Sweet & Bitter	Format: CD; Release Date: January 18, 2013; Language: Korean, English; Record Label: Macaroon Company, Kingpin Entertainment	Track listing: 1. Sweet & Bitter; 2. 처음 만난 자유; 3. Can You (duet with Hosomi Takeshi); 4. Lullaby; 5. My J Boy; 6. 있잖아, (Without Him ver.); 7. 토요일 오후에 (Mars ver.); 8. 149; 9. She Was Right (Liverpool ver.); 10. Away From You; 11. Beautiful Collision; 12. Can You (Korean ver.) (feat. 조규찬)
