= Park Gil-sung =

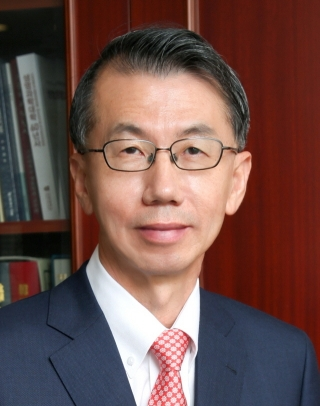

Korean name
- Hangul: 박길성
- Hanja: 朴吉聲
- RR: Bak Gilseong
- MR: Pak Kilsŏng

Gil-Sung Park is the Chairman of The Blue Tree Foundation and Emeritus Professor of Korea University. He is also known as the Member of Samsung Ho-Am Prize Committee and the Member of Seoul Peace Prize Selection Committee. He was also the Provost and Executive Vice President for Academic Affairs, and Professor of Sociology at Korea University, and the President of the Korean Sociological Association starting in 2019. He also served as the former Dean of the Graduate School and of College of Liberal Arts at Korea University, and the board of directors of the National Research Council for Economics, Humanities, and Social Sciences in Korea.

== Biography ==
Park was born in Myungju, Gangwon-do, South Korea. He obtained his B.A. and M.A. degrees from Korea University, followed by a Ph.D. in Sociology from the University of Wisconsin–Madison in 1988. As a leading sociologist in South Korea, Park's research spans a variety of issues in economic sociology, information sociology, comparative sociology, developmental sociology, and sociology of world society. He has been a member of the Presidential Advisory Committee of Aging and Future Society, and President of the Korean Comparative Sociological Association and World Association for Hallyu Studies (WAHS). He was also a visiting scholar at the Center for International Affairs, Harvard University, and was a visiting professor at Washington University in St. Louis. Park was a former director of the Institute of Social Research at Korea University and an adjunct professor at the Utah State University. Park's current research focuses on the Korean Wave and its social, economic, and cultural implications in both Korean and global contexts.

== Editorial activity ==
Park was a former Editor-in-Chief of the Korean Journal of Sociology, a flagship journal of the Korean Sociological Association, and served on the editorial board of several scholarly journals including Global Policy and International Journal of Comparative Sociology, of which he also guest-edited a special issue.

== Selected bibliography ==
- Park, Gil-Sung (2022) "Development and Globalization in South Korea: From Financial Crisis to K-pop." Korea University Press.
- Park, Gil-Sung, I. Oh (2017) "Political Economy of Business Erhics in East Asia." Elsevier. Pages 151-157
- Park, Gil-Sung (2013) "Society makes conflict, conflict makes society." Korea University Press.
- Park, Gil-Sung, Yong Suk Jang, and Hang-Young Lee (2007) "Global and Local Interplay: Korea’s Globalization Revisited." International Journal of Comparative Sociology 48(4): 337-353.
- Park, Gil-Sung and Tackmeon Lee (2007) Understanding Theories in Economic Sociology. Seoul: Namam Publishing House.
- Park, Gil-Sung (2003) Restructuring of Korean Society: Forced Adjustments and Contentious Coordinations. Seoul: Korea University Press.

== See also ==
- List of sociologists
- Economic sociology
- List of University of Wisconsin–Madison people
