= Korean Journal of Sociology =

- Discipline: Sociology
- Language: Korean, English
- Edited by: In Hee Hahm

Publication details
- History: 1964-present
- Publisher: Seoul National University Press on behalf of the Korean Sociological Association (South Korea)
- Frequency: Bimonthly

Standard abbreviations
- ISO 4: Korean J. Sociol.

Indexing
- ISSN: 1225-0120

Links
- Journal homepage

- Korean Journal of Sociology
- Hangul: 한국사회학
- Hanja: 韓國社會學
- Revised Romanization: Hanguksahoehak
- McCune–Reischauer: Hankuksahoehak

The Korean Journal of Sociology (Korean: Han'guk Sahoehak, 한국사회학) is a peer-reviewed academic journal on sociology that was established in 1964. It is the official journal of the Korean Sociological Association and covers theoretical developments, results of qualitative or quantitative research that advance our understanding of Korean society, and related subjects. The aim of the journal is to promote academic interaction and communication among sociologists in Korea and abroad. The editor in chief is In Hee Hahm (Ewha Womans University). The journal was published quarterly between 1964 and 2000, but since 2001 is published bimonthly, with issues in Korean published in February, April, August and October (issues 1, 2, 4, 5) and issues in English published biannually in June and December (issues 3 and 6). The journal is abstracted and indexed by CSA Illumina's Sociological Abstracts as a "core" journal.
