= Korean Sociological Association =

South Korean organisation

- Hangul: 한국사회학회
- Hanja: 韓國社會學會
- Revised Romanization: Hanguksahoehakhoe
- McCune–Reischauer: Hankuksahoehakhoe

The Korean Sociological Association is South Korea's national academic organization for sociologists and those researching the related social sciences. It was founded in 1956 and has been publishing the Korean Journal of Sociology since 1964. In addition it organises annual symposia and workshops and hosts biannual nationwide conventions as well as quarterly seminars, and various occasional workshops. It is one of the larger of Korea's academic organizations with over 800 members.

The role of the KSA in the development of Korean sociology is discussed by Park Myoung-Kyu and Chang Kyung-Sup (1999). In particular its role in permitting "the values and norms of scientific research to be articulated, shared and controlled". They also note the key role played by the KSA in debates about the need for relevance and indigenization.
