= Soy Kim =

South Korean entertainer (born 1980)

- Born: Kim So-yeon; November 24, 1980 (age 45); British Hong Kong
- Education: Korea University
- Occupations: Actress; singer-songwriter; model
- Years active: 1999–present
- Relatives: Kim Hye-won (sister); Cho Kyu-chan (brother-in-law); Paul Kim (cousin)
- Musical career
- Genre: Acoustic music
- Instruments: Vocals; acoustic guitar
- Years active: 1999–present

Korean name
- Hangul: 김소연
- RR: Gim Soyeon
- MR: Kim Soyŏn

Stage name
- Hangul: 김소이
- RR: Gim Soi
- MR: Kim Soi

Kim So-yeon (김소연; born November 24, 1980), known professionally as Soy Kim (김소이), is a South Korean actress, singer-songwriter, and model.

== Career ==
=== Film ===
Soy started her acting career as Hye-young in the 2005 movie The Wig. After landing several lead roles in movies such as Ohayo Sapporo, she began working closely with South Korean director Shin Yeon-shick in movies such as Rough Play, The Avian Kind, and most recently a lead role in his omnibus Like a French Film, opposite Steven Yeun from The Walking Dead.

=== Interviewer ===
Due to her multilingualism, Soy had the opportunity to interview many Hollywood stars such as Ben Stiller, Liam Neeson, Mike Myers, and Beyoncé. She also had interviewed Leonardo DiCaprio, Tom Hardy, and director Alejandro G. Iñárritu for the 2015 Academy Award-winning film The Revenant.

=== Music ===
Soy was included in the original lineup for S.E.S under SM Entertainment in 1997, but left the group prior to debut for personal reasons.

Soy started her musical career as the leader of 5-member K-pop girl band T.T.MA in 1999. After releasing two albums, the group disbanded in 2002 and Soy now performs under the moniker, Raspberry Field.

== Early life ==
Soy was born in British Hong Kong. She has an older sister named Kim Hye-won, who is married to singer Cho Kyu-chan. Her parents were South Korean diplomats, allowing her to travel to many countries in her youth such as England, United States, and Taiwan. Her cousin is singer Paul Kim.

Upon her return to South Korea, she enrolled in Korea University and graduated with a Bachelor's degree in Chinese Language & Literature. She is also an M.A. candidate in media studies.

Soy is fluent in English, Korean, and Chinese.

== Filmography ==
=== Film ===
Year	Title	Role	Notes
2005	The Wig	Hye-young	
2007	The Cut	Eun-joo	
2011	Index Finger	Soy	Short film
2013	Ohayo Sapporo	Mo Re	Short film
2013	Rough Play	Theatre Actress	Cameo
2015	The Avian Kind	So-yeon	
2016	Like a French Film	Soyeon	

=== Television ===
Year	Title	Role	Notes
2009	High Kick Through the Roof	Soy	Supporting role
2010	I Am Legend	Shin-ae	Guest role
2012	I Love Lee Tae-ri	Na Hong-shil	Supporting role
2014	Potato Star 2013QR3	Herself	Cameo
2024	Sorry Not Sorry	Shannon's mom	Supporting role
2026	XO, Kitty	Yisoo	Supporting role

== Discography ==
=== As Raspberry Field ===
Studio albums

- Sweet & Bitter (2013)
- Dream, Cast (2015)

Singles

- "Saturday Afternoon" (2010)
- "Have You Seen...?" (2010)
- "You Know" (2010)
- "Can You" (2012)
- "What a Feeling" (2013)
- "Time Traveler" (2013)

=== As T.T.MA ===
Studio albums

- In the Sea (1999)
- 2nd Story I Wanna Be... (2000)
