= Yoon Chang-jung =

South Korean journalist and official (born 1956)

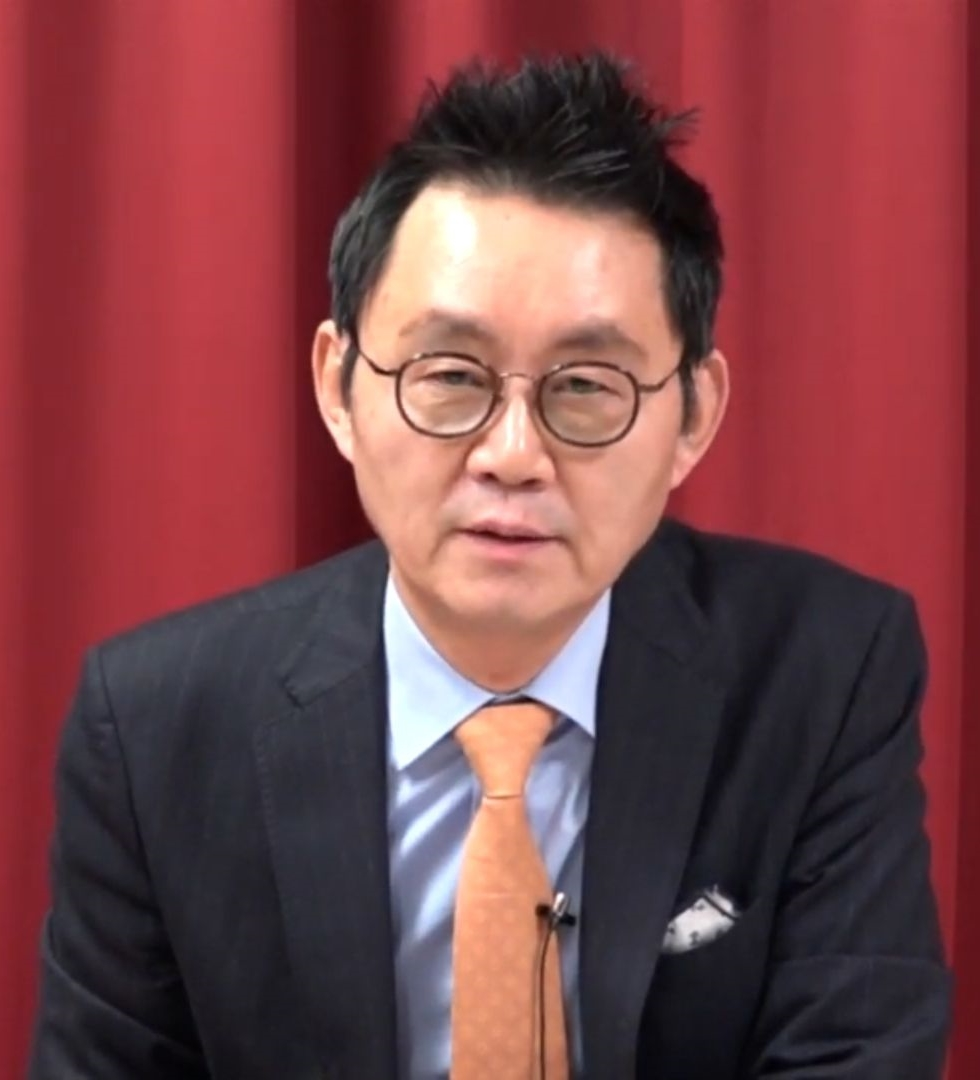

Korean name
- Hangul: 윤창중
- Hanja: 尹昶重
- RR: Yun Changjung
- MR: Yun Ch'angjung

Yoon Chang-jung (Korean: 윤창중; Hanja: 尹昶重; born July 17, 1956) is a South Korean journalist and official. He briefly served as the press spokesman for Korean president Park Geun-hye in early 2013, and was fired following a sexual assault on a Korean American female intern at the South Korean Embassy in the U.S. in May 2013. This event is said to "have overshadowed President Park's first visit to the US".

Yoon is a 1982 Korea University alumnus who joined the Park election team in 2012. becoming the Blue House spokesman on February 24, 2013. He has been described as a "conservative columnist ... disliked by many progressives".

== Sexual assault incident ==
South Korean President Park Geun-hye visited the United States between May 5 and 9, with Yoon accompanying Park as her chief spokesman.

The sexual assault, or sexual harassment in question, consisted of groping the intern, and later calling her up to his room and answering the door either naked or in underwear (sources vary); those events occurred on May 7. On May 8, 2013, the intern reported those events to the American police. Yoon escaped to Seoul after the alleged assault. Kwak Sang-do, Senior Secretary to the President for Civil Affairs, said the order for Yoon to return "didn't conflict with any South Korean or US laws," and that "Yoon's return from the US was a policy decision by the Blue House, and because he was only under indictment, it was not a criminal flight from justice for him to return to South Korea."

Yoon apologized for his actions on May 11, 2013.

On May 12, 2013, Present Park Geun-hye fired spokesman Yoon Chang-jung in the middle of her trip to the United States after he was accused of sexually assaulting a Korean American female intern from the Washington, D.C. Embassy of South Korea. President Park and her office have apologized for Yoon actions on Monday.

23 women lawmakers of the Democratic Party in South Korea condemned Yoon for having returned to South Korea in a rush to avoid a U.S. police investigation into his alleged sexual assault and criticized the Blue House for trying to cover up the scandal. The Democratic Party has demanded the resignation of a number of Blue House officials. It has also called for a more thorough investigation. Due to those allegations and demands, Ms. Park’s senior presidential press secretary and Mr. Yoon’s immediate supervisor, Lee Nam-ki, who is said to have encouraged Yoon to return to South Korea as soon as possible to avoid being arrested by U.S. law enforcement, declared that he is willing to resign. On May 10, the Democratic Party stated that the Washington scandal was a "foreseeable tragedy" because of Park’s refusal to heed her critics.
