= Cha Jun-hwan =

South Korean figure skater (born 2001)

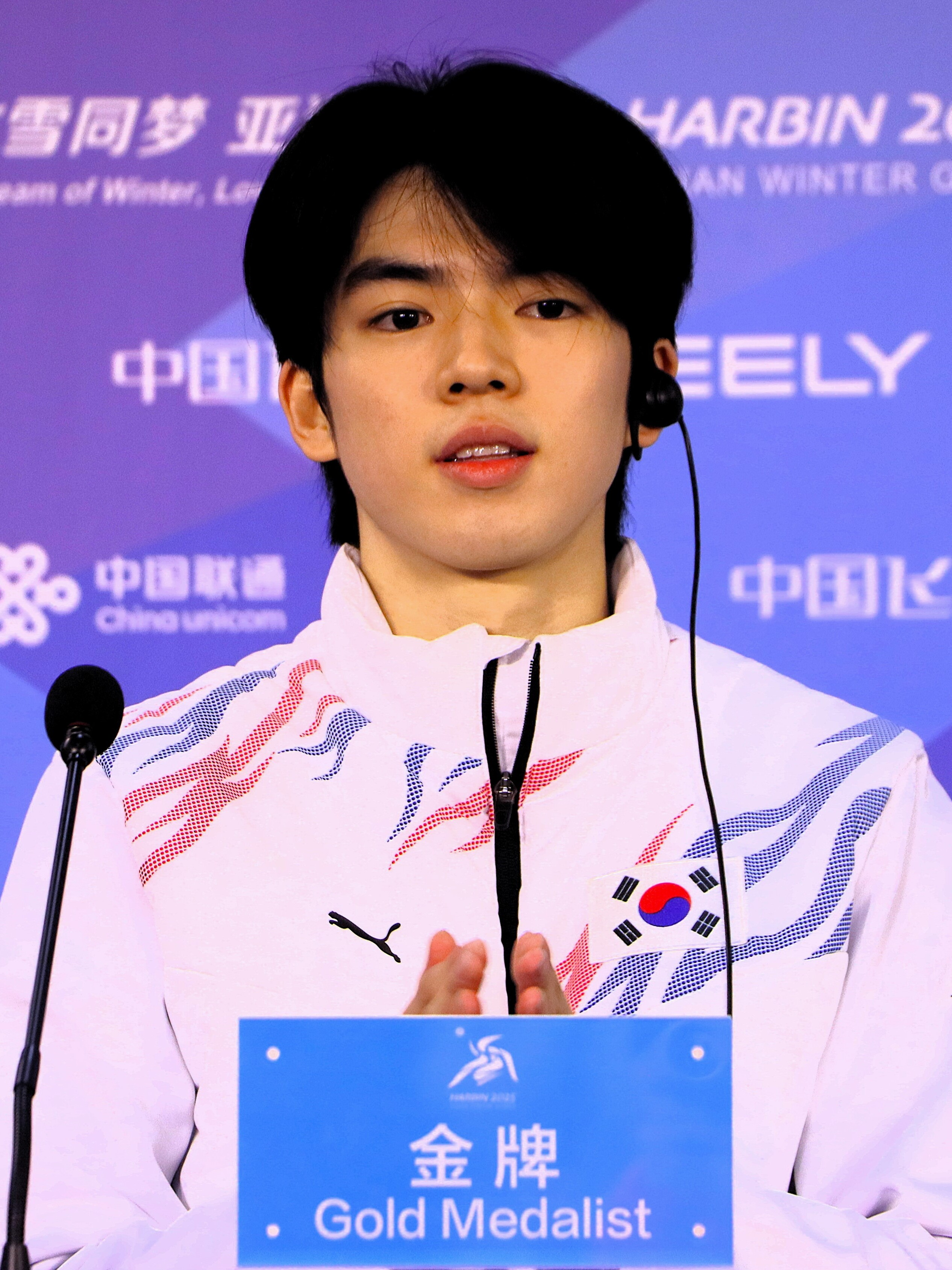
- Cha at the 2025 Asian Winter Games

Personal information
- Native name: 차준환
- Born: October 21, 2001 (age 25) Seoul, South Korea
- Education: Korea University
- Height: 1.80 m (5 ft 11 in)

Figure skating career
- Country: South Korea
- Discipline: Men's singles
- Coach: Chi Hyun-jung
- Began skating: 2009
- Highest WS: 3rd (2022–23)

Medal record
| Event | Gold medal – first place | Silver medal – second place | Bronze medal – third place |
| World Championships | 0 | 1 | 0 |
| Four Continents Championships | 1 | 2 | 1 |
| Grand Prix Final | 0 | 0 | 1 |
| South Korean Championships | 10 | 0 | 2 |
| World Team Trophy | 0 | 1 | 0 |
| Junior Grand Prix Final | 0 | 0 | 1 |
Medal list
World Championships
| Silver medal – second place | 2023 Saitama | Singles |
Four Continents Championships
| Gold medal – first place | 2022 Tallinn | Singles |
| Silver medal – second place | 2025 Seoul | Singles |
| Silver medal – second place | 2026 Beijing | Singles |
| Bronze medal – third place | 2024 Shanghai | Singles |
Grand Prix Final
| Bronze medal – third place | 2018–19 Vancouver | Singles |
South Korean Championships
| Gold medal – first place | 2017 Gangneung | Singles |
| Gold medal – first place | 2018 Seoul | Singles |
| Gold medal – first place | 2019 Seoul | Singles |
| Gold medal – first place | 2020 Uijeongbu | Singles |
| Gold medal – first place | 2021 Uijeongbu | Singles |
| Gold medal – first place | 2022 Uijeongbu | Singles |
| Gold medal – first place | 2023 Uijeongbu | Singles |
| Gold medal – first place | 2024 Uijeongbu | Singles |
| Gold medal – first place | 2025 Uijeongbu | Singles |
| Gold medal – first place | 2026 Seoul | Singles |
| Bronze medal – third place | 2015 Seoul | Singles |
| Bronze medal – third place | 2016 Seoul | Singles |
World Team Trophy
| Silver medal – second place | 2023 Tokyo | Team |
Junior Grand Prix Final
| Bronze medal – third place | 2016–17 Marseille | Singles |

Korean name
- Hangul: 차준환
- Hanja: 車俊煥
- RR: Cha Junhwan
- MR: Ch'a Chunhwan

Cha Jun-hwan (Korean: 차준환; born October 21, 2001) is a South Korean figure skater and actor. He is the 2023 World silver medalist, a four-time Four Continents medalist (gold in 2022, silver in 2025 and 2026, and bronze in 2024), the 2018–2019 Grand Prix Final bronze medalist, a six-time Grand Prix medalist (6 bronze), a five-time ISU Challenger Series medalist (2 gold and 3 silver), the 2025 Asian Winter Games champion, the 2025 World University Games bronze medalist, as well as a ten-time consecutive South Korean national champion (2017–2026). He represented South Korea at the 2018, 2022, and 2026 Winter Olympics. At the junior level, Cha is the 2016–17 Junior Grand Prix Final bronze medalist and a two-time Junior Grand Prix gold medalist.

Cha is the first South Korean man to win and to medal at the Four Continents Championships and the Asian Winter Games, as well as the first to medal at the World Championships, Grand Prix Final, Junior Grand Prix Final, and any senior Grand Prix event.

== Personal life and education ==
Cha Jun-hwan was born on October 21, 2001, in Seoul, South Korea. He has a brother who is four years older than him and a cat named Thor. In addition, he speaks English fluently.

He graduated from Whimoon Middle School and Whimoon High School. In 2020, he enrolled in the Global Sport program at Korea University, majoring in Sport Business, and graduated in 2025.

== Competitive skating career ==
=== Early career ===
Having learned various skills such as ballet, swimming, violin and piano to become a more versatile actor, Cha also began skating at age seven during a special class held at a public rink near his home over the school break. Although he initially started with short-track speed skating, he later switched to figure skating, which he found more engaging. After the class ended, he decided to pursue figure skating seriously. He later said that while skating, he "liked the wind" and "felt the freeness," which was "so impactful" that he continued to learn skating and decided to become an athlete. His first coach was former South Korean Olympic competitor Shin Hea-sook, and his skating idols were Evgeni Plushenko and Daisuke Takahashi.

Cha placed fourth as a junior skater at the 2011 South Korean Championships. In 2012, he won the junior level at the South Korean Championships. In the 2012–13 season, he took the novice gold medal at the Asian Trophy and repeated as the junior champion at the South Korean Championships. He placed fifth at the senior level at the 2014 Korean Championships. This was his first senior experience at national championships. During the 2014–15 season, Cha won the novice gold medal at the Merano Cup and the senior bronze medal at the South Korean Championships. In March 2015, he began training in Toronto under Brian Orser to improve his jumps, including the triple Axel and quads.

=== Junior career ===
==== 2015–16 season: Junior international debut ====
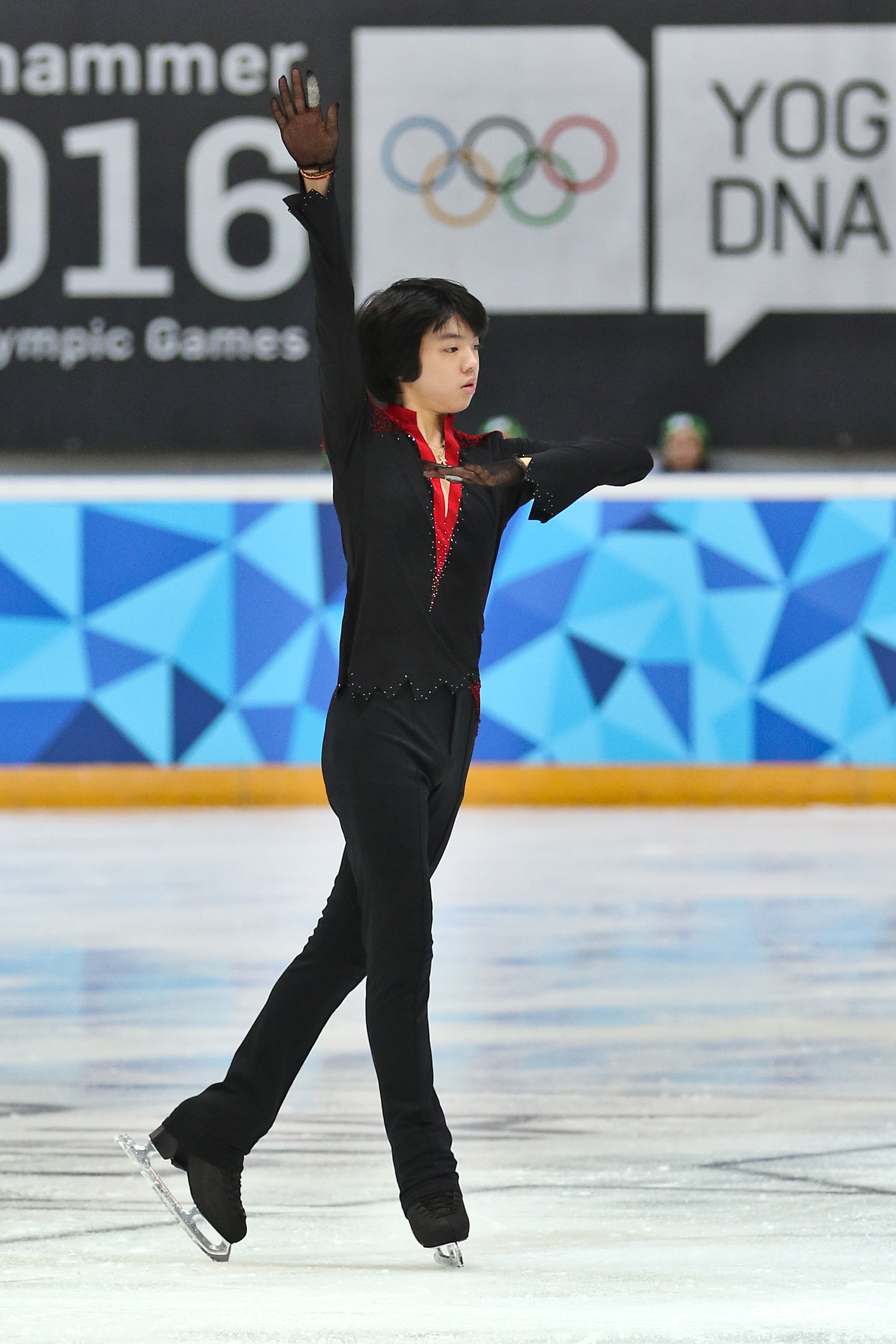
Cha performing his short program at the 2016 Winter Youth Olympics

Cha earned a spot on the national team for the first time after combining his scores from the two major domestic competitions, the 2014 Ranking Competition and the 2015 Korean Championships. In August, he competed in the Korean qualifying competition for the Junior Grand Prix, but due to the lingering effects of an ankle fracture, he did not make the list of selected athletes. Later, reflecting on this experience, he said, "I pushed myself to compete with an unhealed body, but I didn't lower the difficulty of my program. It was an inevitable result." He went on to add, "It was reckless, but I worked hard nonetheless."

Making his junior international debut, Cha won gold at the 2015 Skate Canada Autumn Classic by over 30 points. Despite a deduction, he landed his first triple Axel in an international competition. At the 2015 Ranking Competition in South Korea, he claimed his first senior-level win with a total score of 220.40 points, setting a new national record for Korean men's singles. Competing with an ear infection at the 2016 South Korean Championships, he won the senior national bronze medal again.

In February, Cha represented South Korea at the 2016 Winter Youth Olympics, becoming the youngest member of the South Korean team. He placed fourth in the short program, fifth in the free skating, and fifth overall. In the team event, Cha competed for Team Courage, earning a season's best 139.97 points in the free skate to place third individually, while the team finished sixth overall. In March, Cha competed at the 2016 World Junior Championships. He placed seventh in the short program with 74.38 points and sixth in the free skate with 132.73 points. In both segments, he successfully landed the triple Axel and received GOE for the first time at an international competition. With a total score of 207.11 points, he finished seventh overall.

==== 2016–17 season: Junior Grand Prix Final bronze ====
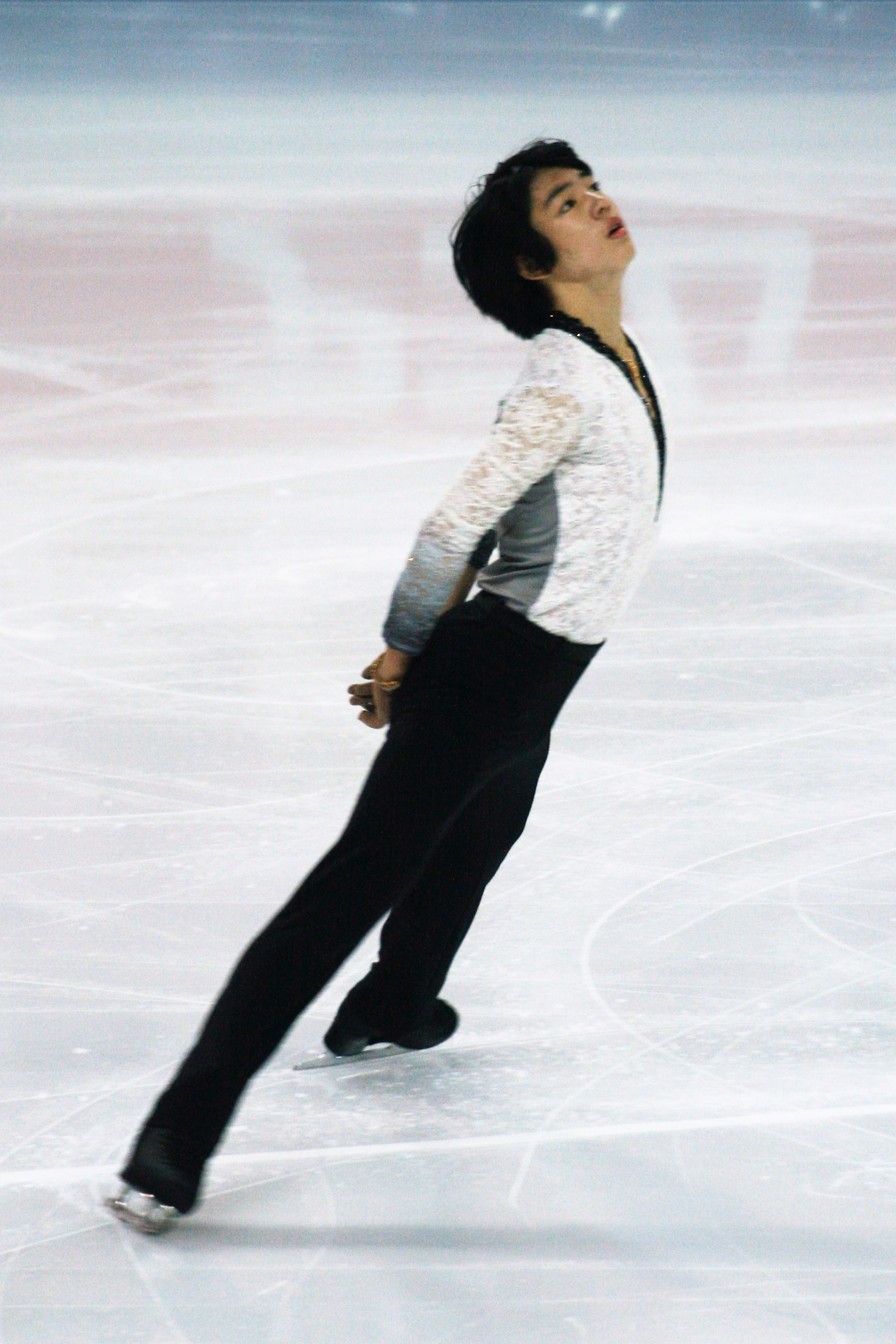
Cha at the 2016–17 JGP Final

Starting the 2016–17 season, Cha placed first at the Korean qualifying competition for the Junior Grand Prix, earning two spots on the circuit. He made his Junior Grand Prix debut at the JGP Japan, scoring a personal best of 79.34 points in the short program and placing second. In the free skate, he scored another personal best of 160.13 points by landing a quadruple Salchow with a 2.0 GOE, making him the first Korean male skater to successfully land a quad jump in an ISU international competition and the youngest male skater in the world to do so at the time. His combined total of 239.47 points set a new world record for junior men's combined total score, earning him the gold medal. Cha then won his second gold medal at the 2016 JGP Germany, becoming the first Korean male skater to win two consecutive Junior Grand Prix titles, which qualified him for the 2016–17 Junior Grand Prix Final.

One week later, Cha earned his second consecutive win at the 2016 Ranking Competition held in South Korea. In the 2016–17 Junior Grand Prix Final, he fell on the combination jump in the short program causing a large point loss, but completed the other elements without major errors to place fourth. In the free program, he placed third by successfully performing most elements, except for a fall on the second triple flip. He won the bronze medal, becoming the first Korean male skater to medal at the Junior Grand Prix Final. Cha reflected on his first Junior Grand Prix circuit, saying, "I learned a lot from it." He mentioned that he realized it's important to "enjoy the competition" and "maintain rhythm during the performance."

In January, Cha won his first national title at the 2017 South Korean Championships. At the 2017 World Junior Championships in March, he earned a personal best of 82.34 points in the short program, placing second. He added two quad Salchows in the free program unlike previous competitions. He successfully completed the first quadruple combination jump but fell on the second solo quad jump, scoring 160.11 points. He finished fifth overall with a personal best total of 242.45 points, which ranks fifth on the list of highest junior men's combined totals through the 2017–18 season.

=== Senior career ===
==== 2017–18 season: Pyeongchang Olympics ====
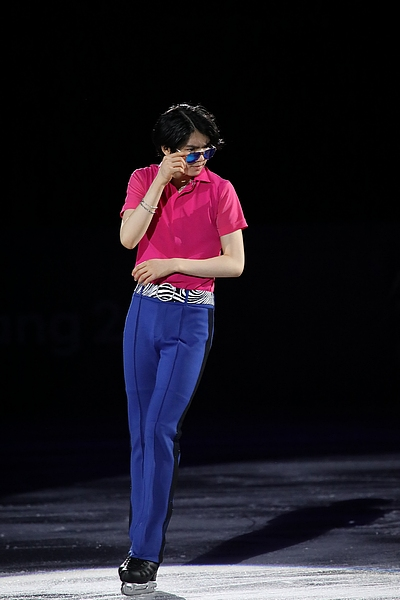
Cha at the exhibition gala at the 2018 Winter Olympics

Cha made his senior debut at age 15 as he was invited to two Grand Prix events. In July, he competed in the first-round Olympic qualifying event, but sustained a hip injury, which landed him nearly 20 points behind the leader. He then suffered a series of ankle and wrist injuries and finished ninth at 2017 Skate Canada. Cha withdrew from 2017 Skate America to focus on the second-round Olympic qualifying and the 2017 Ranking Competition.

He finished second at the aforementioned event, but was 27.54 points behind the leader after the combined scores from the first and second rounds. However, Cha went on to win the third-round qualifying and 2018 South Korea Championships to become the second consecutive national champion. He was selected to represent South Korea at the Olympic after overtaking the leader by 2.13 points with the combined scores from first through third rounds.

Cha competed at the 2018 Winter Olympics Games in Pyeongchang at the age of 16, the youngest competitor in the men's event and the youngest male athlete in any sport on the South Korea team. He arrived late to the athletes' village after being quarantined due to the flu, but competed in the team event, finishing sixth in person and ninth as a team. In the men's event, he scored a personal best 83.43 in the short program to become the first South Korean man to qualify for the Olympic free skate in 20 years. He scored 165.16 in the free program and 248.59 for a total score, all personal bests, and a 15th-place finish, the best Olympic result for a South Korean male skater. He was scheduled to compete at the 2018 World Junior Championships, but withdrew to recover from injury.

==== 2018–19 season: Grand Prix Final bronze ====
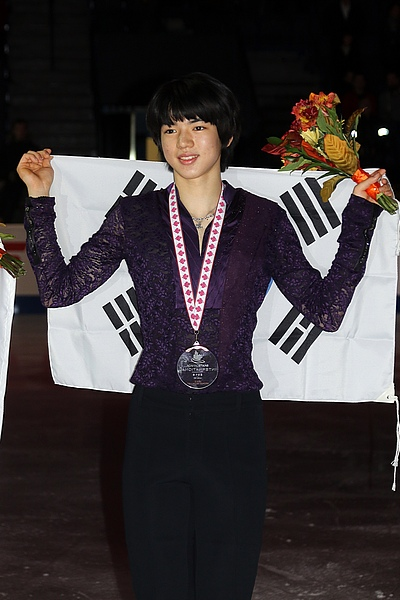
Cha at the 2018 Skate Canada podium

Cha performed his short program to the ballet Cinderella on his coach's recommendation, which he said the choreography was enjoyable. For his free skate he chose Romeo + Juliet himself, a program he had wanted to skate two years ago. He said it was better to perform it this season and was satisfied with the modern-style program and its character. Cha began his season at the 2018 Autumn Classic, where he won the silver medal with a total score of 259.78 points, his first senior international medal. He placed second in the short program with 90.56 points and first in the free skate with 169.22 points. All three scores were personal bests, and he landed a quadruple toe loop and a triple Lutz–triple loop combination. He later won another silver medal at the 2018 Finlandia Trophy with a total score of 239.19 points.

At his first Grand Prix assignment, the 2018 Skate Canada, he placed third in the short program and third in the free skate to win the bronze medal overall, landing two clean quadruple salchows across both segments of the competition. With this finish, Cha became the second-ever South Korean figure skater to win a Grand Prix medal, after Yuna Kim, and the first-ever South Korean man to make the podium at a Grand Prix. Cha then won a second bronze medal at 2018 Grand Prix of Helsinki with a total of 243.19 points, making him the first-ever South Korean man to win two medals on the Grand Prix series. These two bronze medals qualified him for the 2018 Grand Prix Final, making him the first South Korean man to do so and the first from his country since Kim.

Cha concluded the Grand Prix series at the Final, placing fourth in the short program and third in the free skate. This won him the bronze medal, earning personal bests of 174.42 points in the free skate and 263.49 points in total. He is the first South Korean man to win a Grand Prix Final medal and the second South Korean skater to do so since Kim. Following the Final, Cha competed in domestic events over the next three weeks, winning the Seoul qualifying round of the Winter Sports Festival and the 2018 Ranking Competition. He then took his third consecutive South Korean national title.

At the 2019 Four Continents Championships he placed second in the short program with a personal best of 97.33 points, winning a small silver medal. He struggled in the free skate, where six of his jumps were called underrotated. He placed eighth in the free skate and dropped to sixth place overall. Two weeks later, he competed in the high school division of the Winter Sports Festival held in South Korea, finishing first. Despite the physical strain, he said, "Last season my condition was not good and I withdrew from many competitions. This season I decided to compete in all the scheduled competitions." He concluded his season at the 2019 World Figure Skating Championships, placing eighteenth in both the short program and free skate to finish nineteenth overall. After the free skate, he noted that his goal for the season had been to compete in many events so that he "persevered until the end," adding that although there were mistakes he had tried his best throughout. He also described the season as meaningful and mentioned "I learned a lot and grew. I will continue to work hard."

==== 2019–20 season ====
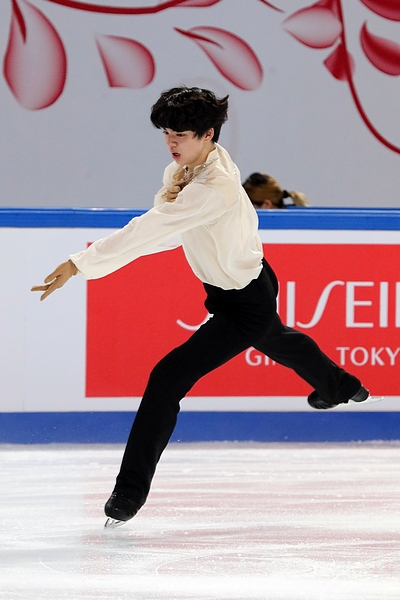
Cha at the 2019 Cup of China

Beginning the season, Cha's short program came from his request to his choreographer to skate an unfamiliar tango. For his free skate, he explained, "This is kind of my story," saying that he intended to portray a person learning about the world and growing through emotions such as happiness, joy, and sadness. His first event of the season was the 2019 CS Autumn Classic International, where Cha attempted the quad flip in competition for the first time. He was fourth overall in the competition after several jumps were called underrotated. At his first Grand Prix assignment, 2019 Skate America, Cha doubled his planned quad in the short program placing seventh. Multiple falls in the free skate dropped him to eighth overall. At the 2019 Cup of China, he began the short program in eleventh place but rebounded in the free skate, finishing sixth overall.

After competing in domestic events, he won the 2019 Ranking Competition for the fourth time and claimed his fourth consecutive national title at the 2020 South Korean Championships. Following that, Cha competed at the 2020 Four Continents Championships, held in Seoul. He earned a season's best in the short program despite underrotating his triple Axel attempt. In the free skate, he landed all his jumps and received level 4 on all his other elements, but four of his jumps were called underrotated, which left him off the podium. Cha was assigned to represent South Korea at 2020 World Championships but the competition was cancelled due to coronavirus pandemic.

==== 2020–21 season ====
The COVID-19 pandemic prompted long-term changes to Cha's training situation as he could no longer reside in Canada, where he had trained since 2015. He was assigned to compete at the 2020 Skate Canada International, but the event was also cancelled as a result of the pandemic. From mid-February, he competed while enduring back pain and a muscle tear in his leg. Cha's first event of the season was the 2021 South Korean Championships held in late February, where he won his fifth consecutive title. He was assigned to Korea's lone men's berth at the 2021 World Championships in Stockholm.

At the 2021 Ranking Competition held in March, he made several mistakes and finished in second place. It was the first time since the 2017 Ranking Competition that he missed winning a domestic competition. Two weeks later, at the 2021 World Championships, Cha placed eighth in the short program. For the free skate, he adjusted the program to prioritize stability, but errors had him place thirteenth in that segment. Still, he held tenth overall and qualified one berth for Korea at the 2022 Winter Olympics, with the possibility of a second to be earned later.

==== 2021–22 season: Beijing Olympics and Four Continents champion ====
Cha began his Olympic season by selecting one of the pieces recommended by fans in a message book for his short program, creating a story in which an orchestra conductor travels through time to find missing members. For his free program, he used Turandot, an opera piece he had originally chosen for the 2020–21 season but could not receive the choreography due to the COVID-19 pandemic. Cha's first competition of the season was the Olympic test event, the 2021 Asian Open in Beijing, where he placed sixth. His first Grand Prix assignment was initially the 2021 Cup of China, but following its cancellation he was reassigned to the 2021 Gran Premio d'Italia in Turin. Third in the short program, he dropped to fifth overall after a sixth-place free skate. At the 2021 NHK Trophy, his second Grand Prix, Cha placed third in the short program and fifth in the free skate, which led to a bronze medal overall. He described himself as "happy but also disappointed because I had a lot of mistakes. I really fought through."

After achieving his fifth win at the 2021 Ranking Competition and claiming his sixth consecutive national title at the 2022 South Korean Championships, he was named to the South Korean team for the 2022 Winter Olympics. Sent to compete at the 2022 Four Continents Championships in Tallinn, Cha placed first in both segments, earning personal bests in the short program and overall total to take the gold medal. He became the first South Korean man to win and medal at the Four Continents Championships. He said afterward that "when coming here, I was not thinking about medals or winning this competition, just training and just doing what I trained before. It was pretty tough to solve all the elements during my practice sessions, but finally, I got the medal, and I'm very satisfied with this."

Competing at the 2022 Winter Olympics in the men's event, Cha skated a clean short program to place fourth in that segment with a new personal best of 99.51. He remarked, "Despite my nervousness, I, trusting my own competence, managed to finish this program as I did in my training." Cha opened his free skate with a hard fall on the quad toe loop but recovered to execute the rest of the program. He earned another set of personal bests, scoring 182.87 points in the free skate and 282.38 points in total, which placed him seventh in the segment and fifth overall. In an interview, Cha noted that he had made a big fall early on but tried to finish the remaining elements well. Since it was the Olympics, he had tried to feel every moment of the competition in detail and make it memorable, and within that goal thought he had done well. He also stated, "Just as I have grown so far, I want to continue developing as a skater. I want to become a stronger and more solid athlete." Then, at the 2022 World Championships, he experienced boot problems during the first official practice and placed seventeenth in the short program. He completed the practice on the day of the free skate, but subsequently withdrew due to the condition of his boots, which made it impossible to perform the program and posed a risk of injury.

==== 2022–23 season: World silver medalist ====
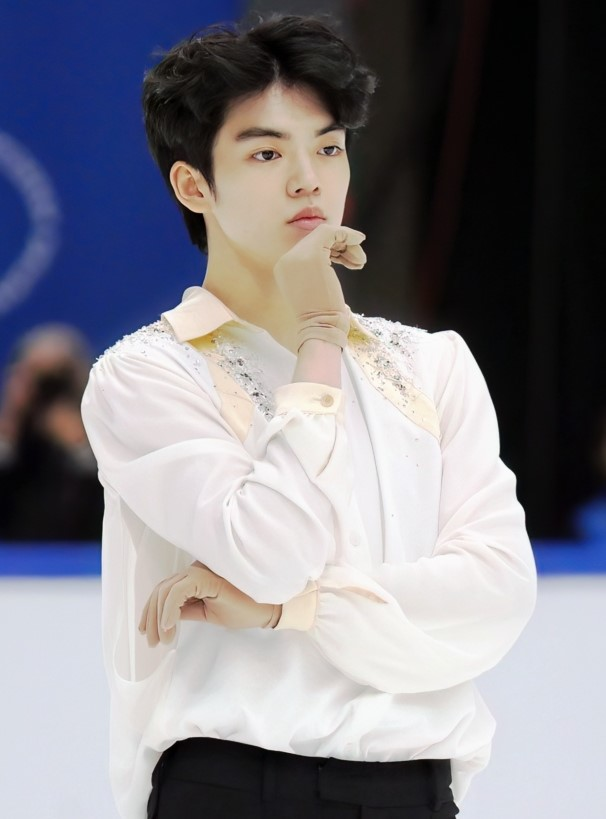
Cha performing his free skate at the 2022 CS Finlandia Trophy

Following the end of the Beijing Olympic cycle, Cha said he wanted to break his habit of using "rather classical music" and instead, "I wanted to show a different side of my character and reinvent myself on the ice. I wanted something modern, with vocals." He and choreographer Shae-Lynn Bourne chose the music of Michael Jackson for the short program while the free skate used the soundtrack of the James Bond film No Time to Die, which he cited as one of his favorites. Cha opted to begin the season with back-to-back events on the Challenger series, citing a desire for "motivation for myself to improve as quickly as possible." He won silver at the 2022 CS Nepela Memorial and then gold at the 2022 CS Finlandia Trophy on the following weekend.

Cha's first Grand Prix assignment of the year was the 2022 Skate America, where he won the bronze medal. He said the result was "not perfect, and it was not what I wanted, but I tried hard, and I'm quite satisfied." At this second event, the 2022 NHK Trophy, he finished sixth in the short program after two jumping errors. He rallied in the free skate, finishing second in that segment and rising to third overall for his second bronze medal of the series. He expressed pleasure at the result after disappointment on the previous day.

He won the 2022 Ranking Competition held in December in South Korea for the sixth time and his seventh consecutive title at the 2023 South Korean Championships held in January. Cha competed at the 2023 Four Continents Championships and finished fifth in the short program after falling on his jump combination and having his triple Axel called on the quarter. A strong free skate lifted him to fourth overall. He revealed that this result was difficult, so he decided to compete at the National Winter Sports Festival held a week later to "reset [his] body and mind and erase bad memories to start fresh." He participated in the university division of the event and placed first.

At the 2023 World Championships in Saitama, Cha skated a clean short program and placed third in the segment with a new personal best score of 99.64. He noted that he had been struggling in recent seasons, but was "happy" that his recent training had paid dividends. Cha finished second in the free skate, rising to second overall and winning the silver medal. In doing so, he became the first South Korean male skater in history to reach the podium at the World Championships. He said he was satisfied "above all with having cleanly performed everything I had practiced," and that he was most gratified by earning three spots for Korean men's singles at the World Championships. A month later, Cha participated in the 2023 World Team Trophy, for which South Korea had qualified for the first time in the history of the event. Cha set a new personal best in the short program, coming second in the segment, and then won the free skate, helping the Korean team win the silver medal.

In June 2023, Brian Orser announced during an interview with Yahoo! Japan that Cha made the decision to end their coaching relationship. Regarding the change, Cha later elaborated, "I worked with Brian for so long time; we know each other so much. Since Covid, everything changed. It was quite hard to train with Brian [because] we just always [only] met at competitions." Orser further stated that he wished Cha all the best and that he would be open to working with him again should he desire.

==== 2023–24 season: Struggles with injury and Four Continents bronze ====
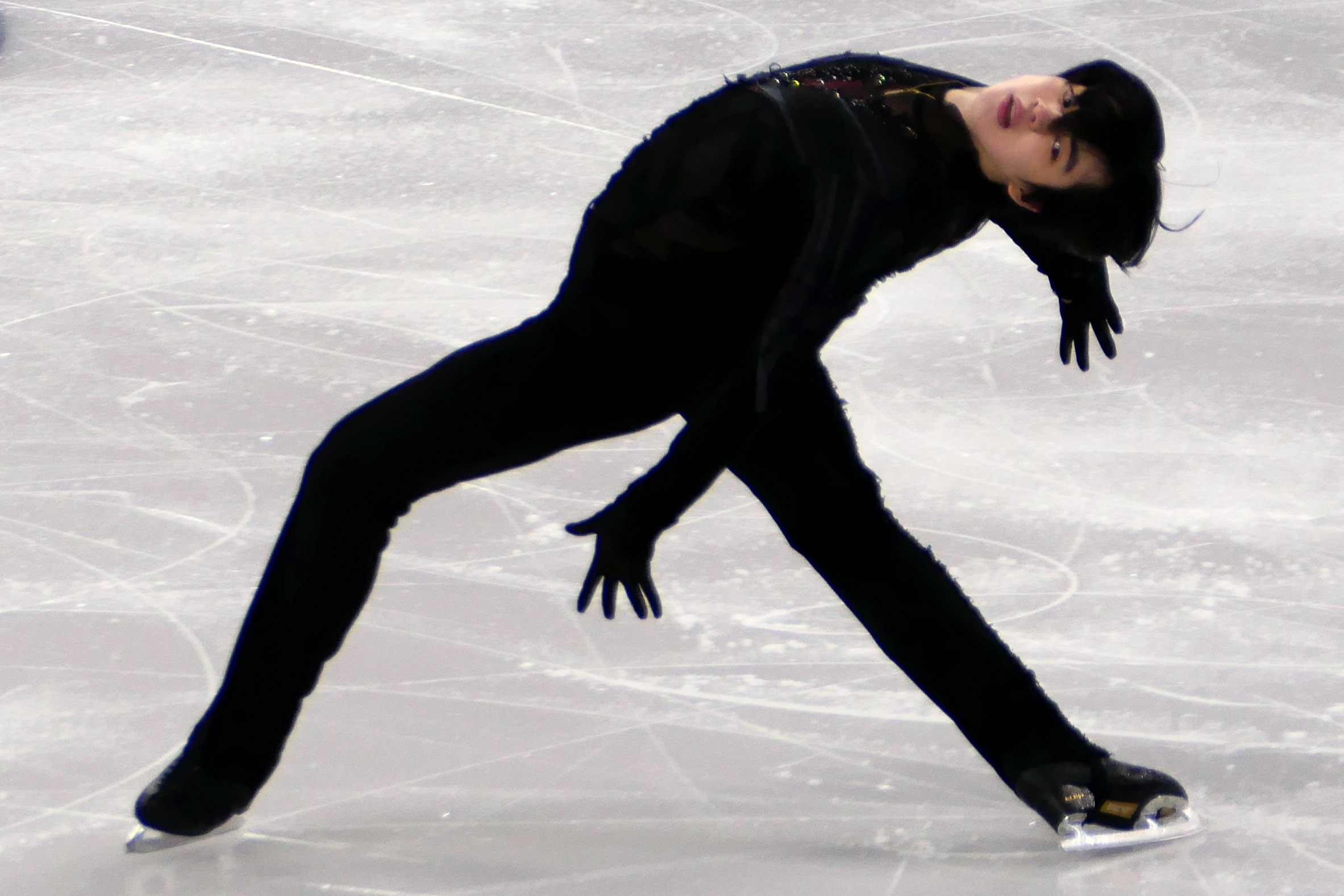
Cha performing his signature Ina Bauer during his free skate at the 2024 World Championships

Cha came sixth at the 2023 CS Nepela Memorial in his first competitive appearance of the season, before winning the silver medal at the Shanghai Trophy. He began the Grand Prix at the 2023 Skate Canada International, placing second in the short program despite a fall on his quad toe loop. However, an error-filled performance in the free skate saw him eleventh in that segment, dropping to ninth overall. Cha subsequently revealed that he was dealing with a right ankle injury, and in consequence he withdrew from the 2023 Grand Prix of Espoo. Despite continuing issues, he planned to participate in the Korean national ranking competition in order to maintain his eligibility for international assignments. He resumed training a week before the ranking competition, and with the use of painkillers was able to compete at and win the event, saying afterward that he would focus on recuperating the nerve injury to his ankle.

After another national gold medal at the South Korean Championships, Cha won the bronze medal at the 2024 Four Continents Championships, including a second-place finish in the free skate. He said afterward that his health was "improving," but that he would continue to work to balance recovery and training. Cha came tenth at the 2024 World Championships. He competed despite his ongoing injury difficulties, but concluded that with the season over "I can take a rest and I think everything will be fine."

==== 2024–25 season: Asian Winter Games champion and Four Continents silver ====
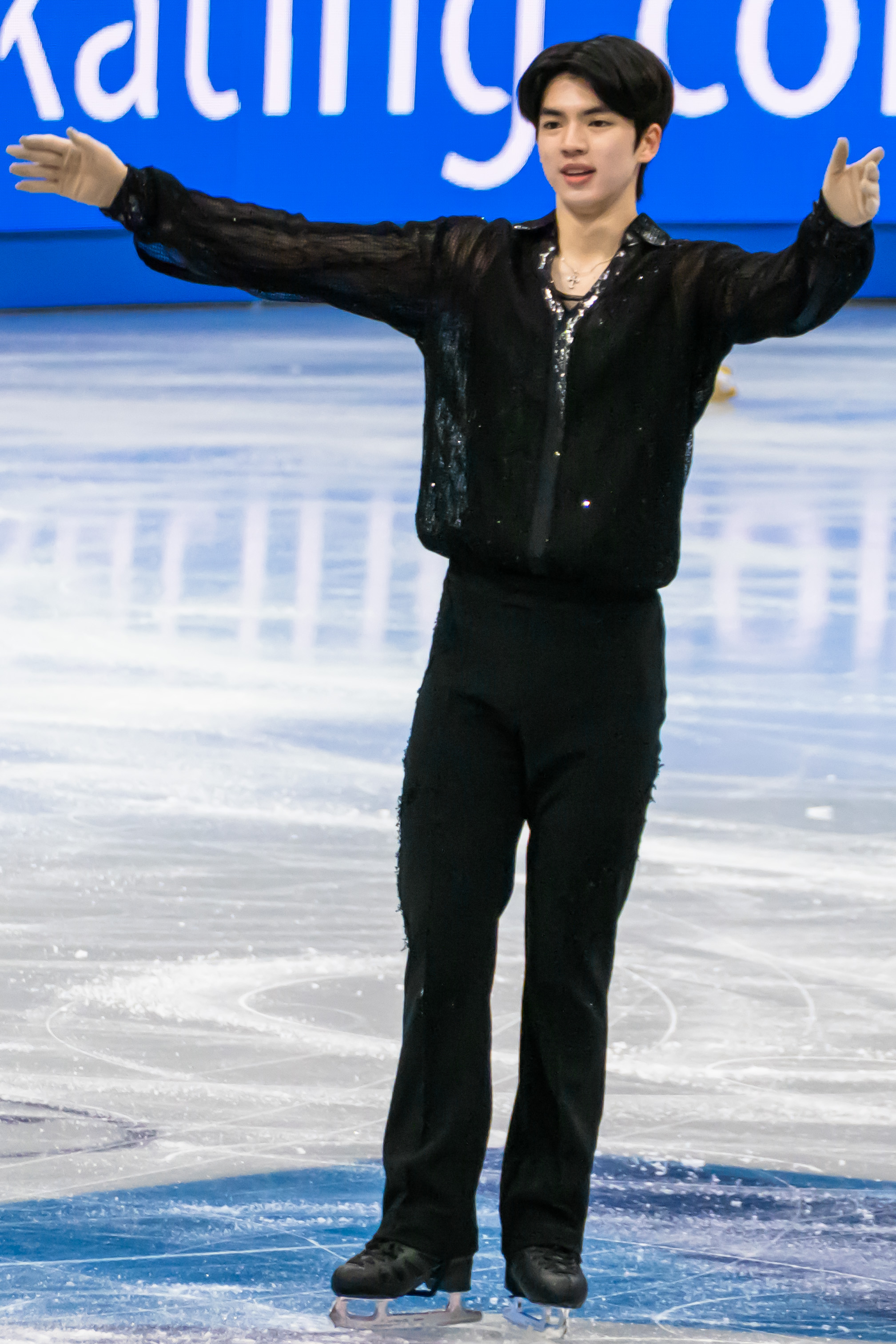
Cha following his short program at 2025 World Championships

As he began the new season, Cha said he loved the lyrics of "Natural" for its strong voice and beat, and he chose it for his short program because it gives him "power" like "magic". He said that his free program "Balada para un Loco" was completely different from his previous music choices, and he felt "really into the voice and the music", so he could "focus on [his own] skating". He also explained that his intention was not just to follow the song's vocals but to express he was "speaking [directly] during [his] skating."

Cha began the season by finishing fourth at the 2024 Nebelhorn Trophy. He went on to take gold at the 2024 Shanghai Trophy. One week following that event, Cha competed at the 2024 Korean Universiade and Asian Games Qualifiers, which he won. With this result, Cha was selected to represent South Korea at the 2025 Winter World University Games and the 2025 Asian Winter Games.

Going on to compete on the 2024–25 Grand Prix series, Cha placed fourth in the short program at 2024 Skate Canada International, but second in the free skate, moving up to the bronze medal position overall. "There were some mistakes, but I think in my condition right now, I think I did everything that I can do right now," said Cha after the free skate. "I think those small mistakes and the quality is what I have to work on and improve for the next one. I think still I can make it better quality. So that's what I've worked on." At the 2024 Finlandia Trophy, Cha placed seventh in the short program after falling on his opening quadruple Salchow. He withdrew from the competition before the free skate morning practice due to worsening ankle pain, as the injury he sustained during the previous season had not yet fully healed. As there were many more international competitions ahead of him this season, Cha stated he would focus on treating his injury, which was aggravated further during the recent boot replacement process, before the upcoming annual Korean Ranking Competition. This competition determines the National Athlete Team membership while also serving as the selection process for the skaters who will participate in the Four Continents Championships for South Korea.

Cha ultimately won the gold medal at the Ranking Competition and was thus named to the 2025 Four Continents Championships team. One month later, he won his ninth consecutive national title at the 2025 South Korean Championships, solidifying his place on the 2025 Worlds team.

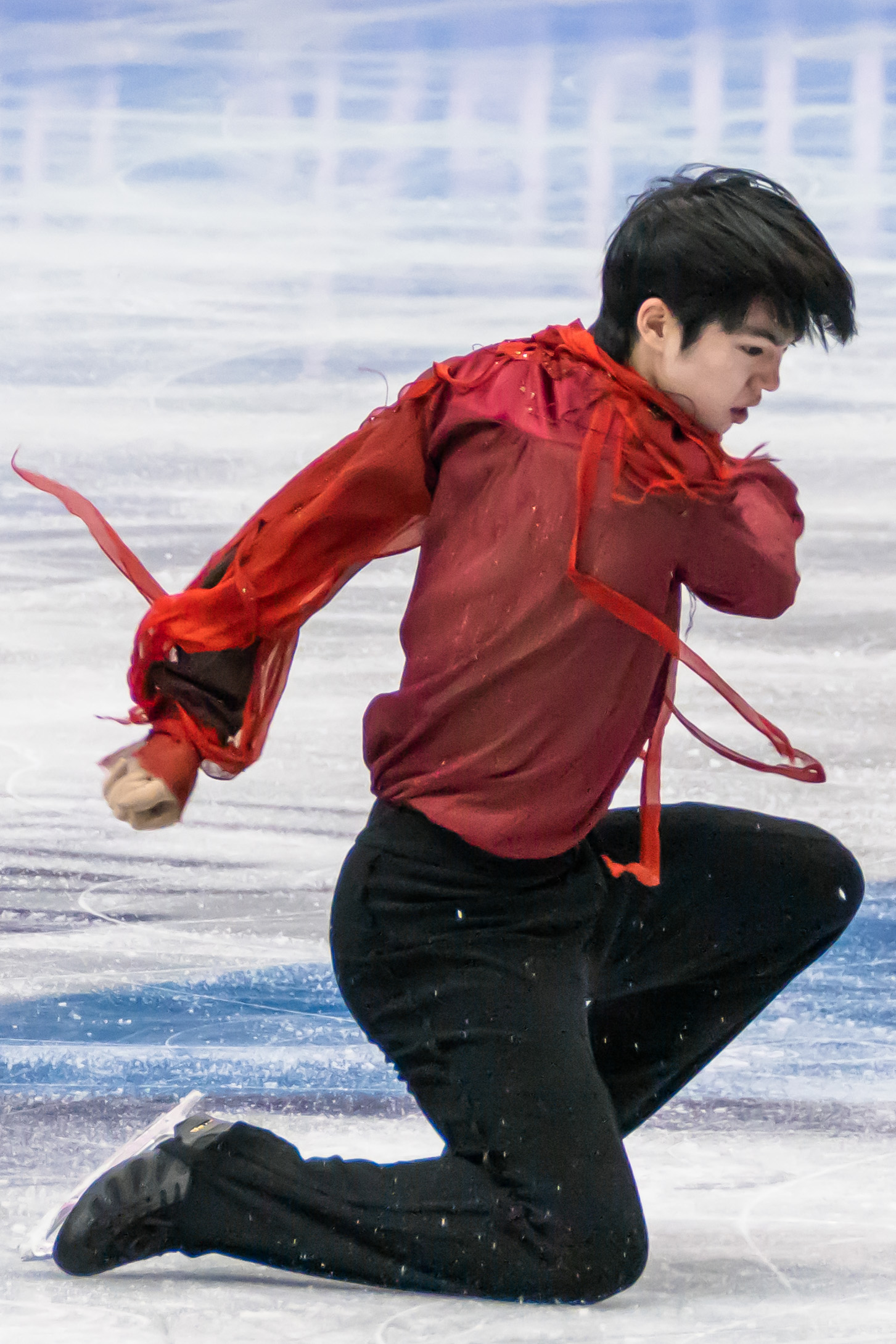
Cha during his free skate at 2025 World Championships

In mid-January, Cha competed at the 2025 Winter World University Games in Turin, Italy. He was fifth after the short program but delivered a clean free skate, winning the bronze medal. He revealed, "until the beginning of December I was having a really bad injury and about a month ago I got into normal training" and said he was very happy that "I saved a lot of things and put in the energy."

Cha then went on to compete at the 2025 Asian Winter Games, where he placed second in the short program but finished first in the free skate to win the gold medal. This marked the first medal and gold ever won by a Korean male skater at the Asian Winter Games. Cha said that he made up for a risky moment in the free skate, noting, "I focused entirely on my performance and tried to maintain my concentration until the very end." He subsequently remarked, "honestly, I was satisfied with the way I performed. I had absolutely no regrets, and it didn't matter to me what the result was." Following his gold medal win, he was classified as Art and Sports Personnel, a type of supplementary service, instead of serving on active duty or as social service personnel. This is generally regarded as a form of exemption from compulsory military service in the Republic of Korea Armed Forces.

One week later, Cha competed at the 2025 Four Continents Championships in his hometown of Seoul. He placed fourth in the short program after popping a planned quad Salchow into a double. During the free skate, Cha skated a solid performance, apart from doubling a planned quad toe loop. He finished second in that segment and won the silver medal overall. Following the event, Cha said, "There are a lot of things going on this season, but I was able to finish my free skating pretty well. It was a bit tough to keep the form as the best, but I've tried my best as this is the second Four Continents held in Korea. I feel a little disappointed about on the double toe-loop but overall, I'm satisfied with the result."

In March, at the 2025 World Championships in Boston, Massachusetts, United States, he fell on his triple Axel in the short program and placed tenth in that segment. In the free skate he placed fifth, which helped him rise to seventh place overall. This result gave South Korea one quota for the men's event at the upcoming 2026 Winter Olympics as well as allowing them to attempt to qualify a second quota at the qualifying competition in September. In an interview following the event, Cha reflected on the season, sharing, "Looking back on my season, it was a long season. I had 11 competitions. My injury got worse in the middle of it, and I wasn’t sure mid-season where I was going to go. But I took one step at a time, and it got better. My biggest support during that time was clearly my family, my fans, and also my coach, who said a lot of motivating and inspiring words to me. Now, I will take some time to recover and train again for the Olympic season."

In May, Cha became the first member to join the Seoul Metropolitan Government's new figure skating team. This marks the first-ever instance of a figure skater joining a workplace sports team in South Korea. He expressed being "honored and excited" and added, "The fact that it is the first such Korean team established for figure skaters makes it even more meaningful." He also went on to say, "As this is the first of its kind, I am eager to see the positive impact it will have on my peers and juniors in the future."

==== 2025–26 season: Milano Cortina Olympics, Four Continents silver, and struggles with boot problems ====
Cha opened the season by competing on the 2025–26 Challenger Series, winning gold at the 2025 CS Kinoshita Group Cup. The following month, he competed at the 2025 CS Denis Ten Memorial Challenge but was forced the withdraw following the short program due to boot problems. Issues with his skates continued at the 2025 Cup of China only weeks later, where Cha finished the event in eighth place overall. A couple weeks following that event, Cha competed at the 2025 NHK Trophy. He placed third in the short program but only tenth in the free skate, dropping to fifth place overall. Following his free skate, he shared, "I wasn't that disappointed with my skating today. For the past few months, I haven't been able to practice as much as I wanted due to boot issues. So, I'll just accept today's result and regroup to prepare for the second half of the season."

In early December, Cha finished second at the Korean Ranking Competition, which named him to the 2026 Four Continents team and placed him in the lead for the Milan Olympics team selection. After the event, he shared that he had not yet found a solution to his boot problems and would likely have to purchase new ones. He said that he felt a bit exhausted but regained his strength thanks to the support, adding, "Although I'm preparing under difficult circumstances, I won't give up until the end." The following month, Cha won his tenth consecutive national title at the 2026 South Korean Championships. Following the event, he was named to the 2026 Winter Olympic team.

Prior to the Four Continents Championships, it was announced that Cha had decided to bring back his "Balada para un Loco" free program from the previous season. At the event, he placed sixth in the short program and won the free skate to win the silver medal overall, only 0.11 points behind gold medalist, Kao Miura. "I'm very happy about my performance today," said Cha after the free skate. "I'm glad that I can skate here, because the last three months I was very unstable. After nationals, I could train properly, especially in these two weeks. Yesterday I made mistakes, but even then, I was really happy that I can skate here and enjoy the competition."

One week before the start of the Olympics, it was announced that Cha and speed skater, Park Ji-woo, would serve as flag bearers for the South Korean Olympic team during the opening ceremony.

On 7 February, Cha placed eighth in the short program in the 2026 Winter Olympics Figure Skating Team Event due popping a planned triple Axel into a single. "I tried my best, I really enjoyed my performance today," he said. "I made a little mistake on the third jump, but I can recover and prepare for that jump in the individual events. Overall, I’m really happy and I really enjoyed the Olympics today." With his placement, Team South Korea finished in seventh place overall.

On 10 February, Cha competed in the short program in the Men's singles event at the 2026 Winter Olympics. He placed sixth in that segment after a relatively clean skate apart from his triple Axel being deemed to have been landed on the quarter. "I think today my biggest goal was to enjoy skating and skate with my heart," said Cha after his performance. "I think I achieved that goal because I really skated from my heart, and I think I truly did my very best. I gave it everything I have. I'm very grateful and happy. Especially today in the venue, the audience was really cheering for the skaters. That was really powerful for us, to react on that energy and give it back. It made us feel really grateful. I was very happy that I could skate here today." Cha's score and placement sparked online backlash with many skating fans feeling like he deserved a higher score than the 92.72 points he was given. He echoed these sentiments in an interview, saying, "Honestly, I expected a slightly higher score. That's probably why I became a bit more indifferent during the kiss-and-cry zone." After the free skating practice, he said, "Even though I did not receive the score I wanted, I believe that the moment in which I gave everything I had was mine. The fact that I did my best does not change."

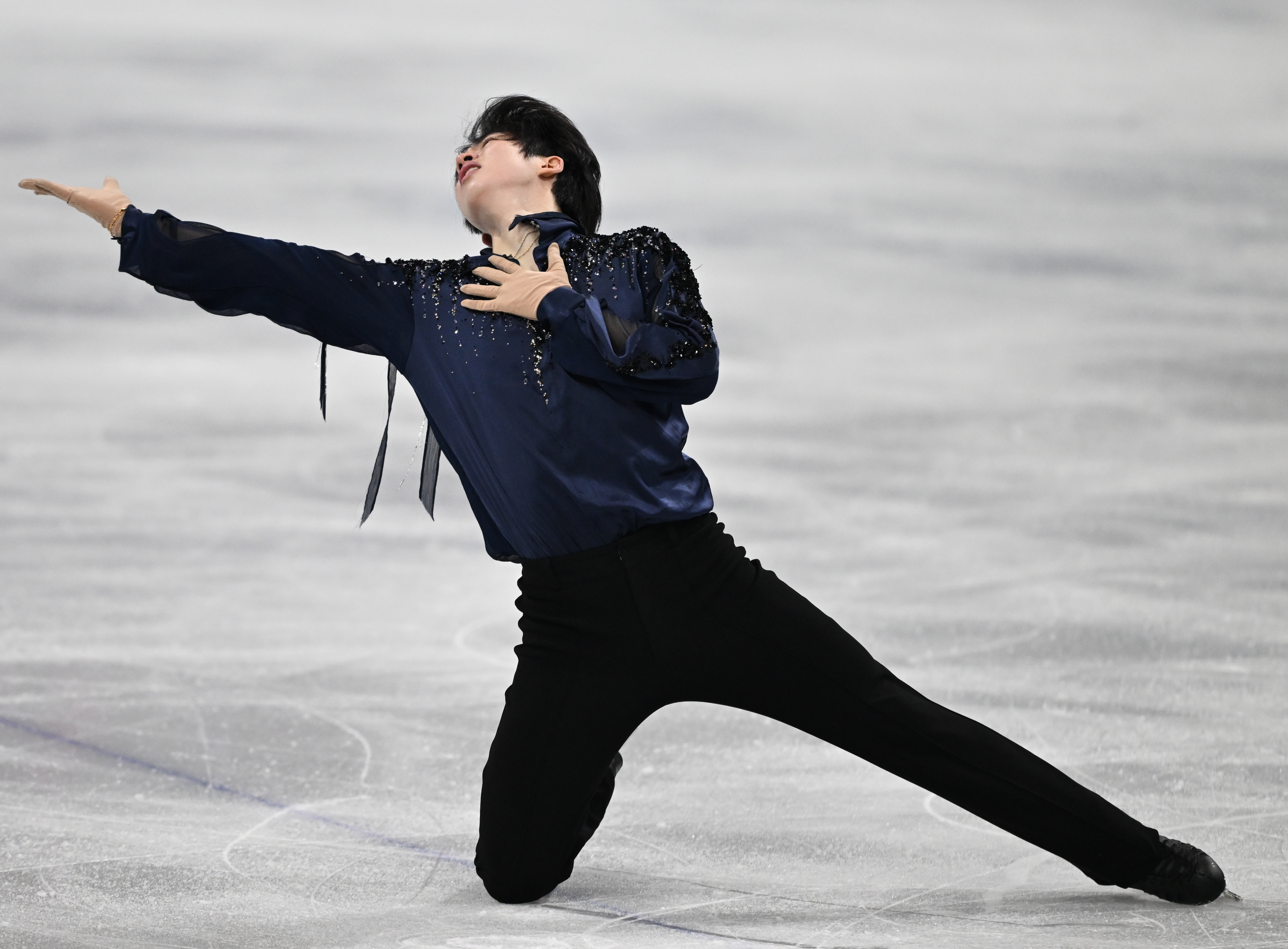
Cha performing at the 2026 Winter Olympics

Two days later, Cha skated a solid free skate apart from falling on a planned quad toe. He placed fifth in that segment and due to a few skaters that placed ahead of him in the short program having error-riddled free skate performances, Cha managed to climb up to fourth place overall, only 0.98 points out of the bronze medal position. Despite this, Cha's placement became the highest result for a South Korean men's singles skater, beating his previous fifth-place finish at the 2022 Winter Olympics. Despite this, Cha expressed satisfaction with his result, saying, "I'm happy, I'm grateful. I really gave my best today here. Even though I made a mistake, I fought through everything else. I gave everything today, so I'm proud of myself that I came here and I didn't give up. It was through those hard times... I didn't expect the placement because my main goal at this point was to have my moment and enjoy that moment. On that side, I think I achieved that goal. So I was already proud of myself and happy." Further reflecting on his struggles with injuries and boot problems throughout the four-year Olympic cycle, he shared, "The thing I'm most proud of is that I didn't give up. Because in the last couple of years I really had a hard time, with injuries or skates. It was really hard for me. Sometimes I didn't even want to think about skating because it was so hurtful. I still don't know how I did it, but somehow every season I stood up again and I didn't give up. I pushed myself again. And finally I came here to compete and skate. So I'm really proud of myself that I made it here." Cha notably had the highest program component scores of the men's free skate event.

Several figure skating fans expressed disappointment at Cha's overall placement, claiming that had his short program been scored higher as fans and skating personnel thought it should have been, he would have won the Olympic bronze medal. Cha said a few days after the free skating event, "Rather than not winning a medal, I feel disappointed that I received a lower score than I deserved after overcoming such a difficult moment. I resented myself for having expected a high score after I finished skating." He added, "The fact that I gave it my all will not change. I think I wrapped up my third Olympics well, so I am accepting the result."

Meanwhile, Martina Corgnati, daughter late singer, Milva, praised Cha's free skate performance to her mother's song, "Balada para un Loco." "That was sublime," she said addressing Cha, "You were so graceful. So deeply in touch with the music that I really felt an emotion I couldn't imagine I could've felt. My mother died five years ago but she would've been so grateful. So touched. That I want to express also from her, our gratitude." She also wrote Cha a letter and gifted him with a Milva CD album that included the song he skated to as well as a rare discontinued set of Milva stamps that had previously been issued in Italy four years prior. In response to Corgnati's recognition, Cha expressed, "It was such an honor. I never imagined they would recognize me like that. I think they did it because my performance touched their hearts. I felt grateful because I felt like my sincerity was conveyed."

Days following the event, Cha revealed that he had been suffering from severe pain in his right ankle throughout the duration of the Games. "To be honest, my physical condition is not normal," he shared. "Over the past month, I changed skates a lot during training (because they didn't fit my feet exactly), and the pressure on my ankle made the pain worse. Fluid built up around the outer ankle bone of my right foot, and I kept having it drained as I prepared for this Olympics. I approached it thinking I would just hold out through this Olympics... Right before arriving in Milan I felt a bout of body aches, and after taking vitamin C before boarding the plane and sleeping deeply, it got a bit better. Once the free skate ended, my body relaxed and my throat started to hurt. I'm glad the cold symptoms got worse only after the free skate." Cha also stated that he was unsure whether he would compete at the 2026 World Championships the following month because of the injury. One week before the event, it was announced that Cha had withdrawn.

==== 2026–27 season: Hiatus ====
On October 12, 2026, Cha announced that he would not continue national team activities or compete in events during the 2026–27 season. He also stated that his contract with the Seoul Metropolitan Government had ended by mutual agreement.

== Other works ==
=== Media career ===
Before becoming a figure skater, Cha was active as a child actor and model. He worked as a child model in magazines and appeared in various commercials for brands in categories such as toys, finance, hygiene products, and food. He also acted in television dramas including Miracle, Best Theater, and The Return of Iljimae.

Since beginning figure skating, Cha has participated in various media activities alongside his athletic career. In 2011, he appeared on the television program Kim Yuna's Kiss & Cry as a professional skating partner to actress Jin Ji-hee. He also took part in the music variety show King of Mask Singer in June 2020, and in December 2022, performed a cover dance and served as a guest MC at the music festival SBS Gayo Daejeon. he has appeared in several popular television programs, including You Quiz on the Block, Running Man, 2 Days & 1 Night, and Knowing Bros. He has also made appearances on news programs such as SBS's News Briefing and JTBC Newsroom, and CCTV's Live News. Additionally, he has also narrated for the Korean radio program Just a Moment campaign and the Korean edition of the BBC documentary series Frozen Planet II.

In April 2026, Cha signed with South Korean entertainment company, Fantagio. In June, it was reported that he was considering a return to acting. In October, he was confirmed to be returning to television drama in the youth sitcom Palace Land, playing Sung Dae-han, a new part-time employee at an amusement park.

=== Endorsements and public appearances ===
Cha has been featured in fashion magazine editorials, including Vogue Korea, Elle Korea, Men's Health Korea, W Korea, GQ Korea and Japan's SPUR. He has participated in several public campaigns, including those by the Seoul Metropolitan Office of Education, the National Election Commission and UNICEF Korea. Cha has also endorsed various brands across fashion, pharmaceutical and healthcare products, and food. In 2025, he was named honorary ambassador for Incheon International Airport and became a promotional ambassador for the 120th anniversary of Korea University following his graduation.

Outside competition, Cha has taken part in various skating events and ice shows. He began performing in public during his novice years. In 2018 and 2019, he took on the role of host for Ice Fantasia, an ice show sponsored by LG. He has also performed in several Japanese ice shows, including Stars on Ice, The Ice, Dreams on Ice, Friends on Ice and Fantasy on Ice.

=== Roles and involvement ===
In January 2020, Cha participated in the 135th IOC Session as part of the South Korean delegation supporting the bid to host the 2024 Winter Youth Olympics. Motivated by this experience, he ran in the 2025 domestic selection to become the South Korean candidate for the IOC Athletes' Commission, with the goal of advocating for athletes' rights, while the candidacy was awarded to bobsledder Won Yun-jong. In June of the same year, Cha was named as one of 13 elected members of the Athletes' Committee of the 42nd Korean Sport & Olympic Committee and commenced a four-year term. He was also appointed as a vice chairperson for winter sports.

He took part in national ceremonies commemorating the March First Movement, reciting the pledge to the national flag at the 103rd anniversary in 2022 and delivering a message expressing commitment at the 106th anniversary ceremony in 2025. In observance of International Youth Day on August 12, 2025, Cha delivered a keynote speech on youth and peace at a public communication event organized by the Ministry of Unification.

=== Choreography ===
Cha expanded his involvement in choreography in 2026. He said, "I really like the moment of creating something. The creative process is my favorite part of skating." He choreographed exhibition programs for South Korean skaters including Shin Ji-a and Lee Jae-keun. He also noted, "It is enjoyable to think about how to bring out each skater's potential and see the overall picture." In May 2026, Cha was cast as the lead character Sung Jin-woo in the ice show adaptation of Solo Leveling, and in June 2026 he was credited as a co-choreographer for the show alongside Kim Hae-jin.

== Records and achievements ==
- The first South Korean male skater to medal at the World Championships (2023 Worlds)
- The first South Korean male skater to win and medal at the Four Continents Figure Skating Championships (4CC 2022)
- The first and currently the only South Korean skater to break the 100-point mark in the short program in an international competition (2023 World Team Trophy)
- The first South Korean male skater to qualify for and medal at the Grand Prix Final (2018–19 Grand Prix Final)
- The first South Korean male skater to medal at two consecutive ISU Grand Prix events. (2018 Skate Canada and 2018 Grand Prix of Helsinki).
- The first South Korean male skater to medal at an ISU Grand Prix event (2018 Skate Canada)
- The first South Korean male skater to win an ISU Challenger Series event (2022 CS Finlandia Trophy)
- The first South Korean male skater to win and medal at the Asian Winter Games (2025 Asian Winter Games)
- The first South Korean male skater to medal at the ISU Junior Grand Prix Final (2016–17 Junior Grand Prix Final)
- The first South Korean male skater to win two consecutive ISU Junior Grand Prix events (2016 Junior Grand Prix Japan, 2016 Junior Grand Prix Germany)
- The first South Korean skater to land a quad jump at a competition recognized by the ISU (2016 Junior Grand Prix Japan)
- At 14 years old, Cha was the youngest man to land a quad Salchow at the 2016 Junior Grand Prix Japan. Record was broken by Stephen Gogolev at the 2018 Junior Grand Prix Slovakia.

=== Historical junior world record score ===
Cha had set a junior world record score under the previous +3/-3 GOE system.

| Date | Seg. | Score | Event | Note |
|---|---|---|---|---|
| September 11, 2016 | Combined total | 239.47 | 2016 JGP Japan | Broken by Dmitri Aliev at the 2016–17 Junior Grand Prix Final |

== Programs ==
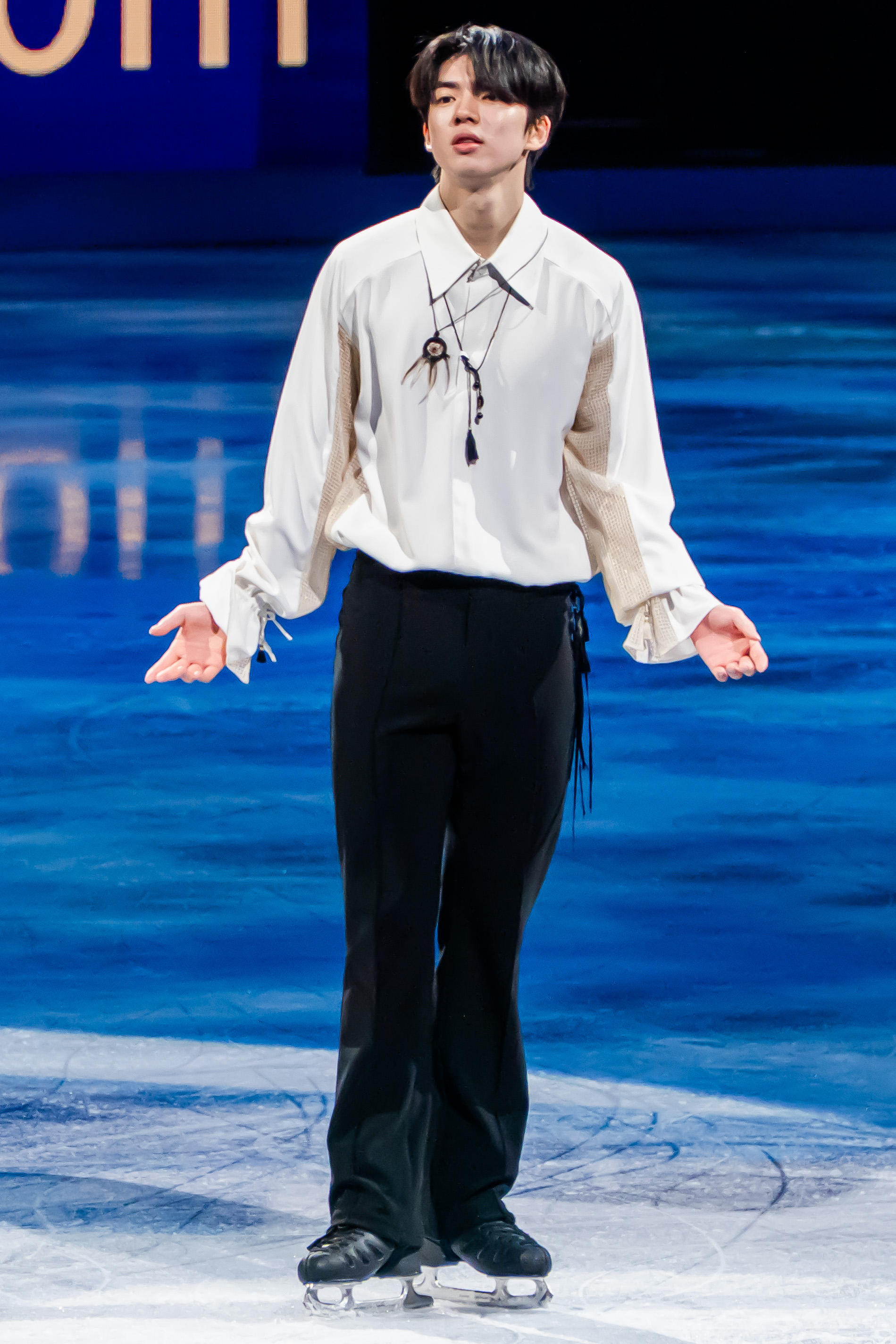
Cha during the gala at the 2025 World Championships

Competition and exhibition programs by season until the 2014–15 season
| Season | Short program | Free skate program | Exhibition program |
|---|---|---|---|
| 2009–10 | —N/a | Kung Fu Panda: 1. Hero; 2. Let The Tournament Begin; Composed by Hans Zimmer, John Powell; Choreo. by Shin Yea-ji | —N/a |
| 2010–11 | "Piano Concerto No. 2": Composed by Sergei Rachmaninoff; Choreo. by Kenji Miyamoto | "La Cumparsita/Tango Please": From Strictly Ballroom; Composed by David Hirschfelder; Choreo. by Kenji Miyamoto | —N/a |
| 2011–12 | "Fantaisie-Impromptu": Composed by Frédéric Chopin; Performed by Robert Wells; Choreo. by Kenji Miyamoto | Pérez Prado Mambo Medley: 1. Granada; 2. St. Louis Blues Mambo; Performed by Pérez Prado; Choreo. by Kenji Miyamoto | —N/a |
| 2012–13 | "Piano Concerto No. 2" | "La Cumparsita/Tango Please" | —N/a |
| 2012–13 | "Fantaisie-Impromptu" | The Mummy: 1. Camel Race; 2. The Caravan; From The Mummy; Composed by Jerry Goldsmith; 3. The Mummy Returns; From The Mummy Returns; Composed by Alan Silvestri; Choreo. by Kenji Miyamoto | "Gopher Mambo": Performed by Yma Sumac; Choreo. by Kenji Miyamoto |
| 2013–14 | "Moonlight Sonata": Composed by Ludwig van Beethoven; Performed by Vladimir Ashkenazy; Choreo. by Shin Yea-ji | "Toccata and Fugue in D minor": Composed by Johann Sebastian Bach; Performed by Boston Symphony Orchestra; Choreo. by Kenji Miyamoto | "Gopher Mambo" |
| 2014–15 | "Danse Macabre": Composed by Camille Saint-Saëns; Choreo. by Cindy Stuart | "Piano Concerto No. 3": From Shine; Composed by Sergei Rachmaninoff; Performed by David Helfgott; Choreo. by Cindy Stuart | "One Day I'll Fly Away": From Moulin Rouge!; Performed by Nicole Kidman; Choreo. by Cindy Stuart |

Competition and exhibition programs by season since the 2015–16 season
| Season | Short program | Free skate program | Exhibition program |
|---|---|---|---|
| 2015–16 | "Scent of a Woman: Tango": Based on Por una cabeza from Scent of a Woman; Composed by John Williams; Choreo. by Kenji Miyamoto | Swan Lake: Composed by Pyotr Ilyich Tchaikovsky; Choreo. by Kenji Miyamoto | —N/a |
| 2015–16 | "Danse Macabre" | Swan Lake | Moulin Rouge!: 1. "One Day I'll Fly Away"; Performed by Nicole Kidman; 2. "The Show Must Go On"; Performed by Jim Broadbent, Nicole Kidman; Choreo. by Cindy Stuart, Joey Russell |
| 2016–17 | A Chorus Line: 1. One; 2. I Hope I Get It; 3. I Can Do That; 4. The Music and the Mirror; Composed by Marvin Hamlisch; Choreo. by David Wilson | Il Postino: The Postman: 1. Il Postino (Guitar and Bandoneon version); Composed by Luis Bacalov; 2. "Mi Mancherai"; Composed by Luis Bacalov, Marco Marinangeli; Performed by Josh Groban, Joshua Bell; Choreo. by David Wilson | "One Day I'll Fly Away" |
| 2016–17 | A Chorus Line: 1. One; 2. I Hope I Get It; 3. I Can Do That; 4. The Music and the Mirror; Composed by Marvin Hamlisch; Choreo. by David Wilson | Il Postino: The Postman: 1. Il Postino (Guitar and Bandoneon version); Composed by Luis Bacalov; 2. "Mi Mancherai"; Composed by Luis Bacalov, Marco Marinangeli; Performed by Josh Groban, Joshua Bell; Choreo. by David Wilson | "Peanut Butter Jelly": Performed by Galantis; Choreo. by Jeffrey Buttle |
| 2017–18 | "What a Wonderful World": Performed by OneRepublic; Choreo. by David Wilson | The Planets: Composed by Gustav Holst; Choreo. by David Wilson | —N/a |
| 2017–18 | "Gypsy Dance": From Don Quixote; Composed by Ludwig Minkus; Choreo. by David Wilson | "The Planets" | "What a Wonderful World" |
| 2017–18 | "Gypsy Dance" | ''Il Postino: The Postman'' | "Peanut Butter Jelly" |
| 2017–18 | "Gypsy Dance" | ''Il Postino: The Postman'' | Il Postino: The Postman |
| 2017–18 | "Gypsy Dance" | ''Il Postino: The Postman'' | "There's Nothing Holdin' Me Back": Performed by Shawn Mendes; Choreo. by David Wilson |
| 2018–19 | "The Prince": 1. Waltz-Coda; 2. Midnight; From Cinderella; Composed by Sergei Prokofiev; Choreo. by David Wilson | Romeo + Juliet: 1. "O Verona"; 2. Young Hearts Run Free (Ballroom Version); 3. Kissing You (instrumental); 4. Mantua; 5. Escape from Mantua; Composed by Nellee Hooper, Craig Armstrong, Marius de Vries; Choreo. by Shae-Lynn Bourne | "There's Nothing Holdin' Me Back" |
| 2018–19 | "The Prince": 1. Waltz-Coda; 2. Midnight; From Cinderella; Composed by Sergei Prokofiev; Choreo. by David Wilson | Romeo + Juliet: 1. "O Verona"; 2. Young Hearts Run Free (Ballroom Version); 3. Kissing You (instrumental); 4. Mantua; 5. Escape from Mantua; Composed by Nellee Hooper, Craig Armstrong, Marius de Vries; Choreo. by Shae-Lynn Bourne | "What a Wonderful World" |
| 2018–19 | "The Prince": 1. Waltz-Coda; 2. Midnight; From Cinderella; Composed by Sergei Prokofiev; Choreo. by David Wilson | Romeo + Juliet: 1. "O Verona"; 2. Young Hearts Run Free (Ballroom Version); 3. Kissing You (instrumental); 4. Mantua; 5. Escape from Mantua; Composed by Nellee Hooper, Craig Armstrong, Marius de Vries; Choreo. by Shae-Lynn Bourne | Romeo + Juliet |
| 2018–19 | "The Prince": 1. Waltz-Coda; 2. Midnight; From Cinderella; Composed by Sergei Prokofiev; Choreo. by David Wilson | Romeo + Juliet: 1. "O Verona"; 2. Young Hearts Run Free (Ballroom Version); 3. Kissing You (instrumental); 4. Mantua; 5. Escape from Mantua; Composed by Nellee Hooper, Craig Armstrong, Marius de Vries; Choreo. by Shae-Lynn Bourne | "Boy with a Star": Performed by Hyuk; Choreo. by David Wilson |
| 2019–20 | Astor Piazzolla Tango Medley: 1. Michelangelo 70; 2. La Muerte del Angel; Composed by Astor Piazzolla; Performed by Pablo Ziegler Quintet; Choreo. by David Wilson | "The Fire Within": Composed by Jennifer Thomas, Kimberly StarKey; Choreo. by Shae-Lynn Bourne | "Crazy": Performed by 2WEI; Choreo. by Joey Russell |
| 2020–21 | "Dark Pastoral": Composed by Ralph Vaughan Williams, David Matthews; Choreo. by David Wilson | "The Fire Within" | —N/a |
| 2021–22 | Eternal Eclipse Medley: 1. Fate of the Clockmaker; Composed by Flynn Hase Spence; 2. Cloak and Dagger; Composed by Bianca Ban; Performed by Eternal Eclipse; Choreo. by Shae-Lynn Bourne | Turandot: 1. Popoli de Pekino; 2. Violin Fantasy on Puccini's 'Turandot'; Performed by Vanessa-Mae; 3. Nessun dorma; Performed by José Carreras; Composed by Giacomo Puccini; Choreo. by Shae-Lynn Bourne | "Crazy" |
| 2021–22 | Eternal Eclipse Medley: 1. Fate of the Clockmaker; Composed by Flynn Hase Spence; 2. Cloak and Dagger; Composed by Bianca Ban; Performed by Eternal Eclipse; Choreo. by Shae-Lynn Bourne | Turandot: 1. Popoli de Pekino; 2. Violin Fantasy on Puccini's 'Turandot'; Performed by Vanessa-Mae; 3. Nessun dorma; Performed by José Carreras; Composed by Giacomo Puccini; Choreo. by Shae-Lynn Bourne | "Believer": Performed by Imagine Dragons; Choreo. by Shin Yea-ji |
| 2021–22 | Eternal Eclipse Medley: 1. Fate of the Clockmaker; Composed by Flynn Hase Spence; 2. Cloak and Dagger; Composed by Bianca Ban; Performed by Eternal Eclipse; Choreo. by Shae-Lynn Bourne | Turandot: 1. Popoli de Pekino; 2. Violin Fantasy on Puccini's 'Turandot'; Performed by Vanessa-Mae; 3. Nessun dorma; Performed by José Carreras; Composed by Giacomo Puccini; Choreo. by Shae-Lynn Bourne | "There's Nothing Holdin' Me Back" |
| 2021–22 | Eternal Eclipse Medley: 1. Fate of the Clockmaker; Composed by Flynn Hase Spence; 2. Cloak and Dagger; Composed by Bianca Ban; Performed by Eternal Eclipse; Choreo. by Shae-Lynn Bourne | Turandot: 1. Popoli de Pekino; 2. Violin Fantasy on Puccini's 'Turandot'; Performed by Vanessa-Mae; 3. Nessun dorma; Performed by José Carreras; Composed by Giacomo Puccini; Choreo. by Shae-Lynn Bourne | "Boy with a Star" |
| 2022–23 | Michael Jackson Medley: 1. Immortal Megamix; 2. Billie Jean; 3. Smooth Criminal (Immortal Version); Performed by Michael Jackson; Choreo. by Shae-Lynn Bourne | No Time to Die: 1. Gun Barrel & Square Escape; 2. Message from an Old Friend; 3. Final Ascent; 4. No Time to Die (instrumental); Remixed by Entropy Zero, Soul Extract; 5. "No Time to Die"; Performed by Billie Eilish; Composed by Hans Zimmer; Choreo. by Shae-Lynn Bourne | "Believer" |
| 2022–23 | Michael Jackson Medley: 1. Immortal Megamix; 2. Billie Jean; 3. Smooth Criminal (Immortal Version); Performed by Michael Jackson; Choreo. by Shae-Lynn Bourne | No Time to Die: 1. Gun Barrel & Square Escape; 2. Message from an Old Friend; 3. Final Ascent; 4. No Time to Die (instrumental); Remixed by Entropy Zero, Soul Extract; 5. "No Time to Die"; Performed by Billie Eilish; Composed by Hans Zimmer; Choreo. by Shae-Lynn Bourne | "Boy with a Star" |
| 2022–23 | Michael Jackson Medley: 1. Immortal Megamix; 2. Billie Jean; 3. Smooth Criminal (Immortal Version); Performed by Michael Jackson; Choreo. by Shae-Lynn Bourne | No Time to Die: 1. Gun Barrel & Square Escape; 2. Message from an Old Friend; 3. Final Ascent; 4. No Time to Die (instrumental); Remixed by Entropy Zero, Soul Extract; 5. "No Time to Die"; Performed by Billie Eilish; Composed by Hans Zimmer; Choreo. by Shae-Lynn Bourne | "Nessun dorma": From Turandot; Composed by Giacomo Puccini; Performed by José Carreras; Choreo. by Shae-Lynn Bourne |
| 2022–23 | Michael Jackson Medley: 1. Immortal Megamix; 2. Billie Jean; 3. Smooth Criminal (Immortal Version); Performed by Michael Jackson; Choreo. by Shae-Lynn Bourne | No Time to Die: 1. Gun Barrel & Square Escape; 2. Message from an Old Friend; 3. Final Ascent; 4. No Time to Die (instrumental); Remixed by Entropy Zero, Soul Extract; 5. "No Time to Die"; Performed by Billie Eilish; Composed by Hans Zimmer; Choreo. by Shae-Lynn Bourne | "Golden Hour": Performed by Jvke; Choreo. by Joey Russell |
| 2023–24 | "Masquerade Waltz": Composed by Aram Khachaturian; Choreo. by Shae-Lynn Bourne | The Batman: 1. The Batman Theme; 2. Sonata in Darkness; 3. "Something in the Way"; Remixed by Samuel Kim; Composed by Michael Giacchino; Choreo. by Shae-Lynn Bourne | Michael Jackson Medley |
| 2023–24 | "Masquerade Waltz": Composed by Aram Khachaturian; Choreo. by Shae-Lynn Bourne | The Batman: 1. The Batman Theme; 2. Sonata in Darkness; 3. "Something in the Way"; Remixed by Samuel Kim; Composed by Michael Giacchino; Choreo. by Shae-Lynn Bourne | "Golden Hour" |
| 2023–24 | "Masquerade Waltz": Composed by Aram Khachaturian; Choreo. by Shae-Lynn Bourne | The Batman: 1. The Batman Theme; 2. Sonata in Darkness; 3. "Something in the Way"; Remixed by Samuel Kim; Composed by Michael Giacchino; Choreo. by Shae-Lynn Bourne | Black Panther: 1. Casino Brawl; Composed by Ludwig Göransson; 2. "Pray for Me"; Performed by The Weeknd, Kendrick Lamar; Choreo. by Shin Yea-ji |
| 2023–24 | "Masquerade Waltz": Composed by Aram Khachaturian; Choreo. by Shae-Lynn Bourne | The Batman: 1. The Batman Theme; 2. Sonata in Darkness; 3. "Something in the Way"; Remixed by Samuel Kim; Composed by Michael Giacchino; Choreo. by Shae-Lynn Bourne | "Masquerade Waltz" |
| 2024–25 | "Natural": Composed by Imagine Dragons; Choreo. by Shae-Lynn Bourne | "Balada para un Loco": 1. "Balada para un Loco"; Performed by Milva; 2. Balada para un Loco; Performed by Alfredo Marcucci, Ensemble Piacevole; Composed by Astor Piazzolla; Choreo. by Shae-Lynn Bourne | "Masquerade Waltz" |
| 2024–25 | "Natural": Composed by Imagine Dragons; Choreo. by Shae-Lynn Bourne | "Balada para un Loco": 1. "Balada para un Loco"; Performed by Milva; 2. Balada para un Loco; Performed by Alfredo Marcucci, Ensemble Piacevole; Composed by Astor Piazzolla; Choreo. by Shae-Lynn Bourne | "Mr/Mme": Performed by Loïc Nottet; Choreo. by Guillaume Cizeron |
| 2024–25 | "Natural": Composed by Imagine Dragons; Choreo. by Shae-Lynn Bourne | "Balada para un Loco": 1. "Balada para un Loco"; Performed by Milva; 2. Balada para un Loco; Performed by Alfredo Marcucci, Ensemble Piacevole; Composed by Astor Piazzolla; Choreo. by Shae-Lynn Bourne | Black Panther |
| 2024–25 | "Natural": Composed by Imagine Dragons; Choreo. by Shae-Lynn Bourne | "Balada para un Loco": 1. "Balada para un Loco"; Performed by Milva; 2. Balada para un Loco; Performed by Alfredo Marcucci, Ensemble Piacevole; Composed by Astor Piazzolla; Choreo. by Shae-Lynn Bourne | "Natural" |
| 2025–26 | "Rain, In Your Black Eyes": Composed by Ezio Bosso; Choreo. by Shae-Lynn Bourne | Moulin Rouge!: 1. "The Show Must Go On"; Performed by Jim Broadbent, Nicole Kidman; 2. "El Tango de Roxanne"; Performed by Ewan McGregor, Jacek Koman, José Feliciano; 3. "Come What May"; Performed by Ewan McGregor, Nicole Kidman; Choreo. by Shae-Lynn Bourne | "Thunder": Performed by Imagine Dragons; Choreo. by Shin Yea-ji |
| 2025–26 | "Rain, In Your Black Eyes" | "Balada para un Loco" | "Not a Dream": Performed by Song So-hee; Choreo. by Shin Yea-ji |
| 2026–27 | —N/a | —N/a | "Experience": Composed by Ludovico Einaudi; Choreo. by Cha Jun-hwan |

== Competitive highlights ==
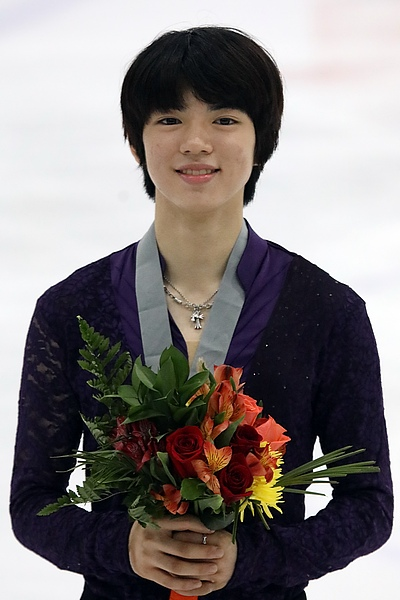
Cha at the 2018 Autumn Classic

- GP – Event of the ISU Grand Prix Series
- JGP – Event of the ISU Junior Grand Prix Series
- CS – Event of the ISU Challenger Series
- TBD – Assigned
- WD – Withdrew from competition
- C – Event was cancelled
- Medals at team events are awarded for the team results only. Individual placements at team events are listed in parentheses.

Competition placements at senior level
| Season | 2017–18 | 2018–19 | 2019–20 | 2020–21 | 2021–22 | 2022–23 | 2023–24 | 2024–25 | 2025–26 | 2026–27 |
|---|---|---|---|---|---|---|---|---|---|---|
| Winter Olympics | 15th | | | | 5th | | | | 4th | |
| Winter Olympics (Team event) | 9th | | | | | | | | 7th | |
| World Championships | | 19th | C | 10th | WD | 2nd | 10th | 7th | WD | |
| Four Continents Championships | | 6th | 5th | | 1st | 4th | 3rd | 2nd | 2nd | |
| Grand Prix Final | | 3rd | | | | | | | | |
| South Korean Championships | 1st | 1st | 1st | 1st | 1st | 1st | 1st | 1st | 1st | |
| World Team Trophy | | | | | | 2nd (1st) | | | | |
| GP Cup of China | | | 6th | | C | | | | 8th | WD |
| GP Finland | | 3rd | | | | | WD | WD | | |
| GP Italy | | | | | 5th | | | | | |
| GP NHK Trophy | | | | | 3rd | 3rd | | | 5th | WD |
| GP Skate America | WD | | 8th | | | 3rd | | | | |
| GP Skate Canada | 9th | 3rd | | C | | | 9th | 3rd | | |
| CS Autumn Classic | | 2nd | 4th | | | | | | | |
| CS Denis Ten Memorial | | | | | | | | | WD | |
| CS Finlandia Trophy | | 2nd | | | | 1st | | | | |
| CS Golden Spin of Zagreb | | | | | WD | | | | | |
| CS Kinoshita Group Cup | | | | | | | | | 1st | |
| CS Nebelhorn Trophy | | | | | | | | 4th | | |
| CS Nepela Memorial | | | | | | 2nd | 6th | | | |
| Asian Games | | | | | | | | 1st | | |
| Asian Open Trophy | | | | | 6th | | | | | |
| Shanghai Trophy | | | WD | | | | 2nd | 1st | | |
| Winter World University Games | | | | | | | | 3rd | | |

Competition placements at junior level
| Season | 2010–11 | 2011–12 | 2012–13 | 2013–14 | 2014–15 | 2015–16 | 2016–17 | 2017–18 |
|---|---|---|---|---|---|---|---|---|
| Winter Youth Olympics | | | | | | 5th | | |
| Winter Youth Olympics (Team event) | | | | | | 6th | | |
| World Junior Championships | | | | | | 7th | 5th | WD |
| Junior Grand Prix Final | | | | | | | 3rd | |
| South Korean Championships (Senior) | | | | 5th | 3rd | 3rd | 1st | |
| South Korean Championships (Junior) | 4th | 1st | 1st | | | | | |
| JGP Germany | | | | | | | 1st | |
| JGP Japan | | | | | | | 1st | |
| Autumn Classic | | | | | | 1st | | |

== Detailed results ==
ISU personal best scores in the +5/-5 GOE System
| Segment | Type | Score | Event |
|---|---|---|---|
| Total | TSS | 296.03 | 2023 World Championships |
| Short program | TSS | 101.33 | 2023 World Team Trophy |
| Short program | TES | 55.04 | 2023 World Championships |
| Short program | PCS | 46.63 | 2023 World Team Trophy |
| Free skating | TSS | 196.39 | 2023 World Championships |
| Free skating | TES | 105.65 | 2023 World Championships |
| Free skating | PCS | 92.28 | 2023 World Team Trophy |

ISU personal best scores in the +3/-3 GOE System
| Segment | Type | Score | Event |
|---|---|---|---|
| Total | TSS | 248.59 | 2018 Winter Olympics |
| Short program | TSS | 83.43 | 2018 Winter Olympics |
| Short program | TES | 45.27 | 2017 World Junior Championships |
| Short program | PCS | 39.64 | 2018 Winter Olympics |
| Free skating | TSS | 165.16 | 2018 Winter Olympics |
| Free skating | TES | 85.59 | 2017 World Junior Championships |
| Free skating | PCS | 81.22 | 2018 Winter Olympics |

- Small medals for the short program and free skating are only awarded at ISU Championships.
- Medals at team events are awarded for the team results only. Individual placements at team events are listed in parentheses.

=== Senior level ===
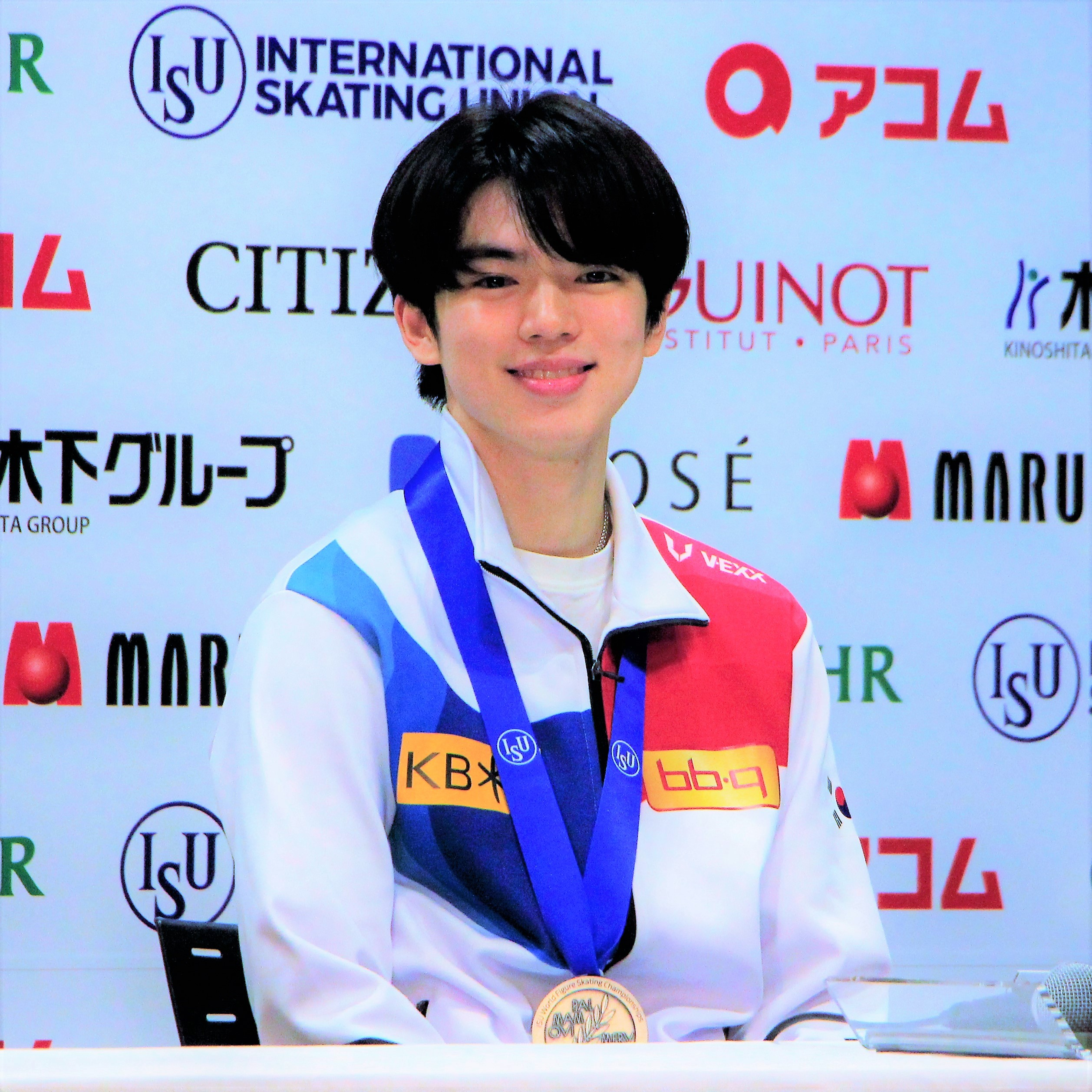
Cha at the 2023 World Championships.

Results in the 2013–14 season
| Date | Event | SP | | FS | | Total | |
| Date | Event | P | Score | P | Score | P | Score |
|---|---|---|---|---|---|---|---|
| Jan 3–5, 2014 | (South Korea) 2014 South Korean Championships | 5 | 60.44 | 3 | 123.94 | 5 | 184.38 |

Results in the 2014–15 season
| Date | Event | SP | | FS | | Total | |
| Date | Event | P | Score | P | Score | P | Score |
|---|---|---|---|---|---|---|---|
| Jan 7–9, 2015 | (South Korea) 2015 South Korean Championships | 4 | 58.28 | 3 | 122.85 | 3 | 181.13 |

Results in the 2015–16 season
| Date | Event | SP | | FS | | Total | |
| Date | Event | P | Score | P | Score | P | Score |
|---|---|---|---|---|---|---|---|
| Jan 8–10, 2016 | (South Korea) 2016 South Korean Championships | 4 | 58.60 | 3 | 131.38 | 3 | 189.98 |

Results in the 2016–17 season
| Date | Event | SP | | FS | | Total | |
| Date | Event | P | Score | P | Score | P | Score |
|---|---|---|---|---|---|---|---|
| Jan 6–8, 2017 | (South Korea) 2017 South Korean Championships | 1 | 81.83 | 1 | 157.24 | 1 | 238.07 |

Results in the 2017–18 season
| Date | Event | SP | | FS | | Total | |
| Date | Event | P | Score | P | Score | P | Score |
|---|---|---|---|---|---|---|---|
| Oct 27–29, 2017 | 2017 Skate Canada International | 11 | 68.46 | 8 | 141.86 | 9 | 210.32 |
| Jan 5–7, 2018 | (South Korea) 2018 South Korean Championships | 1 | 84.05 | 1 | 168.60 | 1 | 252.65 |
| Feb 9–12, 2018 | (South Korea) 2018 Winter Olympics (Team event) | 6 | 77.70 | – | – | 9 | – |
| Feb 14–23, 2018 | (South Korea) 2018 Winter Olympics | 15 | 83.43 | 14 | 165.16 | 15 | 248.59 |

Results in the 2018–19 season
| Date | Event | SP | | FS | | Total | |
| Date | Event | P | Score | P | Score | P | Score |
|---|---|---|---|---|---|---|---|
| Sep 20–22, 2018 | (Canada) 2018 CS Autumn Classic International | 2 | 90.56 | 1 | 169.22 | 2 | 259.78 |
| Oct 4–7, 2018 | (Finland) 2018 CS Finlandia Trophy | 2 | 84.67 | 2 | 154.52 | 2 | 239.19 |
| Oct 26–28, 2018 | 2018 Skate Canada International | 3 | 88.86 | 3 | 165.91 | 3 | 254.77 |
| Nov 2–4, 2018 | (Finland) 2018 Grand Prix of Helsinki | 4 | 82.82 | 3 | 160.37 | 3 | 243.19 |
| Dec 6–9, 2018 | (Canada) 2018–19 Grand Prix Final | 4 | 89.07 | 3 | 174.42 | 3 | 263.49 |
| Jan 11–13, 2019 | (South Korea) 2019 South Korean Championships | 1 | 89.12 | 1 | 156.40 | 1 | 245.52 |
| Feb 7–10, 2019 | (United States) 2019 Four Continents Championships | 2 | 97.33 | 8 | 158.50 | 6 | 255.83 |
| Mar 18–24, 2019 | (Japan) 2019 World Championships | 18 | 79.17 | 18 | 150.09 | 19 | 229.26 |

Results in the 2019–20 season
| Date | Event | SP | | FS | | Total | |
| Date | Event | P | Score | P | Score | P | Score |
|---|---|---|---|---|---|---|---|
| Sep 12–14, 2019 | (Canada) 2019 CS Autumn Classic International | 4 | 84.23 | 4 | 146.21 | 4 | 230.44 |
| Oct 18–20, 2019 | (United States) 2019 Skate America | 7 | 78.98 | 9 | 140.69 | 8 | 219.67 |
| Nov 8–10, 2019 | 2019 Cup of China | 11 | 69.40 | 6 | 152.86 | 6 | 222.26 |
| Jan 3–5, 2020 | (South Korea) 2020 South Korean Championships | 1 | 93.45 | 1 | 185.09 | 1 | 278.54 |
| Feb 4–9, 2020 | (South Korea) 2020 Four Continents Championships | 6 | 90.37 | 4 | 175.06 | 5 | 265.43 |

Results in the 2020–21 season
| Date | Event | SP | | FS | | Total | |
| Date | Event | P | Score | P | Score | P | Score |
|---|---|---|---|---|---|---|---|
| Feb 24–26, 2021 | (South Korea) 2021 South Korean Championships | 1 | 90.36 | 1 | 166.76 | 1 | 257.12 |
| Mar 22–28, 2021 | (Sweden) 2021 World Championships | 8 | 91.15 | 13 | 154.84 | 10 | 245.99 |

Results in the 2021–22 season
| Date | Event | SP | | FS | | Total | |
| Date | Event | P | Score | P | Score | P | Score |
|---|---|---|---|---|---|---|---|
| Oct 13–17, 2021 | (China) 2021 Asian Open Trophy | 5 | 74.47 | 5 | 139.77 | 6 | 214.24 |
| Nov 5–7, 2021 | (Italy) 2021 Gran Premio d'Italia | 3 | 95.56 | 6 | 152.18 | 5 | 247.74 |
| Nov 12–14, 2021 | (Japan) 2021 NHK Trophy | 3 | 95.92 | 5 | 163.68 | 3 | 259.60 |
| Jan 7–9, 2022 | (South Korea) 2022 South Korean Championships | 1 | 98.31 | 1 | 185.00 | 1 | 283.31 |
| Jan 18–23, 2022 | (Estonia) 2022 Four Continents Championships | 1 | 98.96 | 1 | 174.26 | 1 | 273.22 |
| Feb 8–10, 2022 | (China) 2022 Winter Olympics | 4 | 99.51 | 7 | 182.87 | 5 | 282.38 |
| Mar 21–27, 2022 | (France) 2022 World Championships | 17 | 82.43 | – | – | – | WD |

Results in the 2022–23 season
| Date | Event | SP | | FS | | Total | |
| Date | Event | P | Score | P | Score | P | Score |
|---|---|---|---|---|---|---|---|
| Sep 29 – Oct 1, 2022 | (Slovakia) 2022 CS Nepela Memorial | 2 | 80.81 | 2 | 145.51 | 2 | 226.32 |
| Oct 4–9, 2022 | (Finland) 2022 CS Finlandia Trophy | 1 | 91.06 | 1 | 162.14 | 1 | 253.20 |
| Oct 21–23, 2022 | (United States) 2022 Skate America | 2 | 94.44 | 3 | 169.61 | 3 | 264.05 |
| Nov 18–20, 2022 | (Japan) 2022 NHK Trophy | 6 | 80.35 | 2 | 174.41 | 3 | 254.76 |
| Jan 5–8, 2023 | (South Korea) 2023 South Korean Championships | 1 | 101.04 | 1 | 170.17 | 1 | 271.21 |
| Feb 7–12, 2023 | (United States) 2023 Four Continents Championships | 5 | 83.77 | 4 | 166.37 | 4 | 250.14 |
| Mar 20–26, 2023 | (Japan) 2023 World Championships | 3 | 99.64 | 2 | 196.39 | 2 | 296.03 |
| Apr 13–16, 2023 | (Japan) 2023 World Team Trophy | 2 | 101.33 | 1 | 187.82 | 2 (1) | 289.15 |

Results in the 2023–24 season
| Date | Event | SP | | FS | | Total | |
| Date | Event | P | Score | P | Score | P | Score |
|---|---|---|---|---|---|---|---|
| Sep 28–30, 2023 | (Slovakia) 2023 CS Nepela Memorial | 2 | 83.91 | 7 | 138.25 | 6 | 222.16 |
| Oct 3–5, 2023 | (China) 2023 Shanghai Trophy | 1 | 91.80 | 2 | 163.06 | 2 | 254.86 |
| Oct 27–29, 2023 | 2023 Skate Canada International | 2 | 86.18 | 11 | 130.43 | 9 | 216.61 |
| Jan 4–7, 2024 | (South Korea) 2024 South Korean Championships | 1 | 96.51 | 1 | 179.43 | 1 | 275.94 |
| Jan 30 – Feb 4, 2024 | (China) 2024 Four Continents Championships | 3 | 95.30 | 2 | 177.65 | 3 | 272.95 |
| Mar 18–24, 2024 | (Canada) 2024 World Championships | 9 | 88.21 | 11 | 161.44 | 10 | 249.65 |

Results in the 2024–25 season
| Date | Event | SP | | FS | | Total | |
| Date | Event | P | Score | P | Score | P | Score |
|---|---|---|---|---|---|---|---|
| Sep 19–21, 2024 | (Germany) 2024 CS Nebelhorn Trophy | 10 | 69.81 | 3 | 158.67 | 4 | 228.48 |
| Oct 3–5, 2024 | (China) 2024 Shanghai Trophy | 1 | 92.28 | 1 | 177.25 | 1 | 269.53 |
| Oct 25–27, 2024 | 2024 Skate Canada International | 4 | 88.38 | 2 | 171.93 | 3 | 260.31 |
| Nov 15–17, 2024 | (Finland) 2024 Finlandia Trophy | 7 | 77.33 | —N/a | —N/a | – | WD |
| Jan 2–5, 2025 | (South Korea) 2025 South Korean Championships | 1 | 90.53 | 1 | 190.49 | 1 | 281.02 |
| Jan 16–18, 2025 | (Italy) 2025 Winter World University Games | 5 | 82.40 | 2 | 182.54 | 3 | 264.94 |
| Feb 11–13, 2025 | (China) 2025 Asian Winter Games | 2 | 94.09 | 1 | 187.60 | 1 | 281.69 |
| Feb 19–23, 2025 | (South Korea) 2025 Four Continents Championships | 4 | 79.24 | 2 | 185.78 | 2 | 265.02 |
| Mar 25–30, 2025 | (United States) 2025 World Championships | 10 | 86.41 | 5 | 179.33 | 7 | 265.74 |

Results in the 2025–26 season
| Date | Event | SP | | FS | | Total | |
| Date | Event | P | Score | P | Score | P | Score |
|---|---|---|---|---|---|---|---|
| Sep 5–7, 2025 | (Japan) 2025 CS Kinoshita Group Cup | 1 | 87.76 | 1 | 165.55 | 1 | 253.31 |
| Oct 1–4, 2025 | (Kazakhstan) 2025 CS Denis Ten Memorial Challenge | 13 | 70.78 | – | – | – | WD |
| Oct 24–26, 2025 | 2025 Cup of China | 7 | 75.61 | 8 | 141.92 | 8 | 217.53 |
| Nov 7–9, 2025 | (Japan) 2025 NHK Trophy | 3 | 91.60 | 10 | 138.66 | 5 | 230.26 |
| Jan 3–6, 2026 | (South Korea) 2026 South Korean Championships | 1 | 97.50 | 1 | 180.34 | 1 | 277.84 |
| Jan 21–25, 2026 | (China) 2026 Four Continents Championships | 6 | 88.89 | 1 | 184.73 | 2 | 273.62 |
| Feb 6–8, 2026 | (Italy) 2026 Winter Olympics – Team event | 8 | 83.53 | —N/a | —N/a | 7 | —N/a |
| Feb 10–13, 2026 | (Italy) 2026 Winter Olympics | 6 | 92.72 | 5 | 181.20 | 4 | 273.92 |

=== Junior level ===
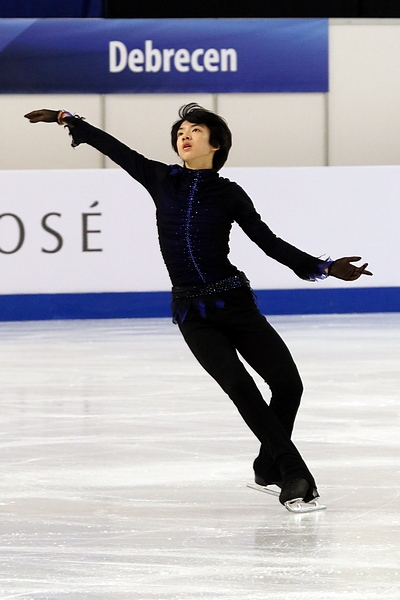
Cha at the 2016 Junior Worlds.

Results in the 2010–11 season
| Date | Event | SP | | FS | | Total | |
| Date | Event | P | Score | P | Score | P | Score |
|---|---|---|---|---|---|---|---|
| Jan 14–16, 2011 | (South Korea) 2011 South Korean Championships (Junior) | 3 | 37.16 | 4 | 70.65 | 4 | 107.81 |

Results in the 2011–12 season
| Date | Event | SP | | FS | | Total | |
| Date | Event | P | Score | P | Score | P | Score |
|---|---|---|---|---|---|---|---|
| Jan 6–8, 2012 | (South Korea) 2012 South Korean Championships (Junior) | 1 | 46.26 | 1 | 86.95 | 1 | 133.21 |

Results in the 2012–13 season
| Date | Event | SP | | FS | | Total | |
| Date | Event | P | Score | P | Score | P | Score |
|---|---|---|---|---|---|---|---|
| Jan 4–6, 2013 | (South Korea) 2013 South Korean Championships (Junior) | 1 | 50.67 | 1 | 100.07 | 1 | 150.74 |

Results in the 2015–16 season
| Date | Event | SP | | FS | | Total | |
| Date | Event | P | Score | P | Score | P | Score |
|---|---|---|---|---|---|---|---|
| Oct 12–15, 2015 | (Canada) 2015 Autumn Classic International | 1 | 65.48 | 1 | 132.96 | 1 | 198.44 |
| Feb 12–21, 2016 | (Norway) 2016 Winter Youth Olympics | 4 | 68.76 | 5 | 130.14 | 5 | 198.90 |
| Feb 12–21, 2016 | (Norway) 2016 Winter Youth Olympics (Team event) | – | – | 3 | 139.97 | 6 | – |
| Mar 14–20, 2016 | (Hungary) 2016 World Junior Championships | 7 | 74.38 | 6 | 132.73 | 7 | 207.11 |

Results in the 2016–17 season
| Date | Event | SP | | FS | | Total | |
| Date | Event | P | Score | P | Score | P | Score |
|---|---|---|---|---|---|---|---|
| Sep 7–11, 2016 | 2016 JGP Japan | 2 | 79.34 | 1 | 160.13 | 1 | 239.47 |
| Oct 5–9, 2016 | 2016 JGP Germany | 1 | 76.82 | 1 | 143.72 | 1 | 220.54 |
| Dec 8–11, 2016 | (France) 2016–17 Junior Grand Prix Final | 4 | 71.84 | 3 | 153.70 | 3 | 225.55 |
| Mar 15–19, 2017 | (Taiwan) 2017 World Junior Championships | 2 | 82.34 | 6 | 160.11 | 5 | 242.45 |

== Filmography ==
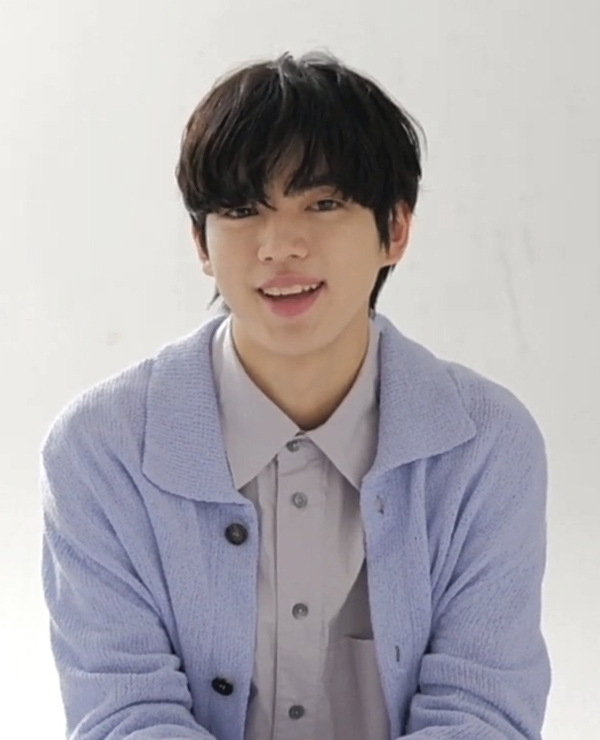
Cha as a magazine model in 2022

=== Television series ===
| Year | Title | Role | Notes | Ref. |
|---|---|---|---|---|
| 2006 | Miracle | Woon-hyuk | | |
| 2007 | Best Theater – Romance Papa | Ha-neul | Episode 658; one act-drama | |
| 2007 | Best Theater – Amnesia | Young Seo Jin-woo | Episode 663; one act-drama | |
| 2008 | Night After Night | Young Heo Gyun | Episode 13 & 17 | |
| 2009 | The Return of Iljimae | Young Iljimae / Young-yi | Episode 2 / Episode 24 | |
| 2009 | The Accidental Couple | Young Han Sang-chul | Episode 4 | |
| 2027 | Palace Land | Sung Dae-han | | |

=== Television shows ===
| Year | Title | Role | Notes | Ref. |
|---|---|---|---|---|
| 2011 | Kim Yuna's Kiss & Cry | Contestant | as Professional skaters (episode 2–10); with Jin Ji-hee | |
| 2017 | Becoming Stars beyond Dreams | Himself | Documentary | |
| 2020 | King of Mask Singer | Contestant | as "Lottery Ticket" (episode 261) | |
| 2024 | Frozen Planet II | Narrator | Nature documentary, KBS version | |

=== Theater ===
| Year | Title | Role | Notes | Ref. |
|---|---|---|---|---|
| 2026 | Solo Leveling on Ice | Sung Jin-woo | | |

=== Music video appearances ===
| Year | Title | Artist | Ref. |
|---|---|---|---|
| 2026 | "Sparkle" | Roy Kim | |

Olympic Games
| Preceded by Kim A-lang and Kwak Yoon-gy | Flagbearer for South Korea (with Park Ji-woo); Milano Cortina 2026 | Succeeded by |
