= T.T.Ma =

South Korean girl group

- Origin: South Korea
- Genres: K-pop
- Years active: 1999–2002, 2007
- Labels: Music Factory Entertainment
- Past members: Soy; Queena; Juhae; Semi; Ujin; Zin; Euni

T.T.Ma (Korean: 티티마) was a five-member South Korean girl group that debuted in 1999. The group, which was referred to as the female version of NRG, disbanded in 2002.

== History ==
One of the group songs, "Loner" was featured in the South Korean dance simulation game Pump It Up. On January 25, 2001, T.T.Ma and their labelmates NRG signed a contract with a Latvian concert performer to embark on a European tour in June, making them the first K-pop groups to perform in Eastern Europe.

After some speculation of a third album, the group was disbanded in 2002, with only Soy (the group leader) continuing in the entertainment industry as a VJ. On May 15, 2007, Ujin released a solo single and the band reunited for a Christmas single that year.

== Members ==
- Soy (소이)
- Queena (퀴나)
- Juhae (주혜)
- Semi (세미)
- Ujin (유진)

=== Later changes ===
At the time of their second album, Juhae and Queena had left T.T.Ma., being replaced by Zin and Euni as the new members.

- Zin (진경) (b. October 13, 1981)
- Euni (은희) (b. February 12, 1981)

== Discography ==
=== Studio albums ===
Title	Album details	Peak chart positions	Sales
Title	Album details	KOR	Sales
In The Sea	Released: May 18, 1999; Label: Music Factory; Format: CD, cassette; Track listings: 1. Come To Me; 2. My Baby; 3. Prism; 4. Audition; 5. Heaven; 6. Smile Again; 7. It’s Me; 8. A+ (A Plus); 9. Loving; 10. Loner	43	KOR: 6,944+
I Wanna Be...	Released: June 15, 2000; Label: Music Factory; Format: CD, cassette; Track listings: 1. Magic; 2. Wanna Be Loved; 3. Don't You Make Me Cry; 4. Going Crazy; 5. 덫 (Trap); 6. Special; 7. 가식 (Pupperty); 8. Delight; 9. Karma; 10. Vacation; 11. 지워 버려 (Erase It); 12. Saturday Night; 13. His Smile; 14. Love Castle	—	—
