= Hyoen =

- Ice show type: Theatrical cross-genre ensemble show
- Format: Figure skating performances combined with acting and singing
- Theme: Japanese culture/heritage
- Cast size: 30-50
- Duration: 125-155 min
- First held: May 2017
- Last held: July 2025
- Status: ongoing
- Country: Japan
- Venue: Yoyogi 1st National Gymnasium (2017); Yokohama Arena (since 2019)
- Attendance: 40,000 (2017 production); 45,000 (2019 production)
- Streaming: Hulu, PIA Live Stream, ZAIKO, ePlus
- Broadcast: NHK BS Premium; CS Nittelle Plus
- Chairperson: Daisuke Takahashi
- Producer: Universal Sports Marketing Co., Ltd.
- Director: Ichikawa Somegorō VII; Amon Miyamoto; Kikunosuke Onoe; Yukihiko Tsutsumi
- Organizer: Nippon Television Network Corporation; Universal Sports Marketing Co., Ltd.
- Sponsor: Sky Court Co., Ltd.; Apex Co., Ltd.; Japan Post Holdings Co., Ltd.
- Website: hyoen.jp

Hyoen (Japanese: 氷艶) is a series of Japanese cross-genre ice shows produced by USM (Universal Sports Marketing Co., Ltd.), starring 2010 Olympic men's figure skating bronze medallist and World Champion, Daisuke Takahashi. Hyoen fuses figure skating with Japanese culture, blending elements of Japanese traditional performing arts (e.g., Kabuki theatre, Takarazuka Revue), contemporary storytelling, music and advanced visual effects. Each production features a narrative, integrating skating, acting, singing, (Japanese) dance and acrobatics, creating a multidisciplinary theatrical experience. Hyoen draws from Japanese heritage, whether through adaptations of classic literature, such as The Tale of Genji (Hyoen 2019) or modern reinterpretations of folklore, such as the Ura Legend (Hyoen 2025), a legend from Okayama that inspired the Momotarō folk tale. Themes range from historical epics to contemporary fantasies, like Night on the Galactic Railroad in Hyoen 2024. The narratives often explore universal themes such as moral conflicts, justice, love, (self) sacrifice/altruism and identity.

== Performers and creative contributors ==
The shows are headlined by Japanese men's figure skating pioneer Daisuke Takahashi, bringing both performance skill and star appeal. The casts are complemented by other popular top figure skaters, such as 2006 Olympic Champion Shizuka Arakawa, 2006 Olympic silver medalist Stéphane Lambiel, 2014 World silver medalist Yulia Lipnitskaya, 2012 World bronze medalist Akiko Suzuki, 2005 World Junior Men's Champion Nobunari Oda, 2010 World Junior Women's Champion Kanako Murakami and Takahashi's ice dance partner, 2022 Four Continents silver medalist, Kana Muramoto, as well as established actors, singers, dancers and performers like Blue Tokyo (an ensemble that fuses dance and rhythmic gymnastics) or Japanese taiko drum ensemble Tao (formerly: Drum Tao).

Notable directors from different fields (e.g., Ichikawa Somegorō VII (now Matsumoto Kōshirō X), Amon Miyamoto, Yukihiko Tsutsumi), musicians (e.g., soundtrack composer Kenji Kawai, SUGIZO, YUZU, Takahiro Matsumoto) and choreographers (e.g., Kikunojo Onoe, Kenji Miyamoto, Tokyo Gegegay, Avecoo), contribute to the productions. VOGUE Japan served as artistic consultant for the 2017, 2019 and 2021 productions.

== Rehearsal process and evolution of performers' skills ==
Because the Hyoen productions are interdisciplinary and performers from various backgrounds perform together on the ice, rehearsals involve intensive training camps lasting several weeks. While actors and singers are learning the basics of figure skating, the figure skaters are receiving acting instructions and, in some cases, singing lessons. For Takahashi, in particular, who often sings and speaks live as a lead actor, Hyoen provides a platform where he takes on new challenges in various performance disciplines beyond figure skating.

== Venue and distribution ==
Hyoen is typically held at Yokohama Arena, accommodating large audiences. The shows have been broadcast live on TV channels NHK BS Premium (2017) and CS Nittele Plus (2019–2025) as well as streamed on HuluJapan (2019, 2021), PIA Live Stream (2019), ZAIKO (2021) and ePlus (2024) and screened nationwide in cinemas.

== Visual production ==
Hyoen utilizes large-scale staging, projection mapping, spatial video production and intricate lighting to create immersive experiences. The implementation of projection mapping followed a test project for the fusion of this technology with figure skating, which was performed by Daisuke Takahashi to the song GIFT by the Japanese pop rock band Mr. Children, in March 2016. The aforementioned project as well as the subsequent implementation in Hyoen were realized by the art collective teamLab, an interdisciplinary group of artists, programmers, engineers, CG animators, mathematicians and architects.

== Productions ==
=== Hyoen 2017 - Basara ===
- Date: May 2017
- Venue: Yoyogi 1st National Gymnasium
- Number of shows: 6
- Attendance: 40,000
- Duration: 135 minutes
- Live Broadcast: NHK BS Premium
- Theme: Inspired by the Genpei War and the legendary figure Minamoto no Yoshitsune, this show incorporated traditional Japanese Kabuki theater elements, one of Japan's cultural arts. The narrative followed a fictional storyline loosely based on historic events, blending skating performances with Kabuki style acting, sword fighting, traditional Japanese music and vibrant costumes. It established Hyoen's signature style of merging athleticism with theatrical storytelling.
- Direction: Basara was directed by Kabuki actor Ichikawa Somegorō VII (now Matsumoto Kōshirō X), who also starred as the villain Nikki Danjo.
- Music: The show featured live Taiko drum performances by Drum Tao.
- Choreography: Kikunojo Onoe (traditional Japanese dance), Kenji Miyamoto (figure skating), Tokyo Gegegay (traditional Japanese dance / hip hop fusion)
- Movement instruction: Kikunojo Onoe
- (Visual) effects: teamLab (projection mapping), Chūnori (wire-flying)
- Notable Performers: Ichikawa Somegorō VII (Kabuki actor) as Nikki Danjo, Daisuke Takahashi (figure skater) as Minamoto no Yoshitsune, Shizuka Arakawa (figure skater) as Goddess Ina / Princess Snake-Hair, Emiya Ichikawa (Kabuki actor) as Iwanaga-hime, Kikaku Nakamura (Kabuki actor) as Saruta Hiko / Musashibo Benkei, Akiko Suzuki (figure skater) as Shizuka Gozen, Hirotaro Otani (Kabuki actor) as Oni Sadobo, Sonosuke Sawamura (Kabuki actor) as Yakko Edobei, Nobunari Oda (figure skater) as God Ninigi no Mikoto, Kanako Murakami (figure skater) as Ame no Uzume, Mai Asada (figure skater) as Konohana Sakuya Hime, members of BLUE TOKYO, Drum Tao

=== Hyoen 2019 - Like the Moonlight ===
- Date: July 26–28, 2019
- Venue: Yokohama Arena
- Number of shows: 6
- Attendance: 45,000
- Duration: 125 minutes
- Live Broadcast: CS Nittelle Plus
- Cinema delayed viewing: nationwide (Japan)
- Streaming: Hulu, PIA Live Stream
- Theme: A loose adaptation of The Tale of Genji, a classic 11th-century Japanese novel by Murasaki Shikibu, depicting the aristocratic society of the Heian period, focusing on the romantic and political life of Hikaru Genji. The show incorporated elements of musical theatre to enhance its storytelling. It combined skating with live singing and acting.
- Direction: Like the Moonlight was directed by internationally acclaimed theatre director Amon Miyamoto.
- Music: Takahiro Matsumoto of the rock duo B'z contributed the theme song. All other music was written by acclaimed soundtrack composer Kenji Kawai.
- Choreography: Kenji Miyamoto (figure skating)
- Movement instruction: Kikunojo Onoe
- (Visual) effects: teamLab (projection mapping), Chūnori (wire-flying)
- Notable Performers: Daisuke Takahashi (figure skater) starring as Hikaru Genji, Stéphane Lambiel (figure skater) as Emperor Suzaku, Ayaka Hirahara (singer) as Kiritsubo Consort / Lady Fujitsubo, Reon Yuzuki (former Takarazuka top star) as Matsuura, Tokuma Nishioka (actor) as Emperor Kiritsubo, Yulia Lipnitskaya (figure skater) as Murasaki no Ue, Shizuka Arakawa (figure skater) as Empress Kokiden, Seiji Fukushi (actor) as Chujo Tono, Kazuki Namioka (actor) as Nagamichi, Nobunari Oda (figure skater) as Onmyoji, Kanako Murakami (figure skater) as Sakikaze, Akiko Suzuki (figure skater) as Oborozukiyo, members of BLUE TOKYO, members of MOTOFUJI

=== LUXE 2021 (Hyoen spin-off) ===
- Date: May 15–17, 2021
- Venue: Yokohama Arena
- Number of shows: 6
- Duration: 150 minutes
- Live Broadcast: CS Nittelle Plus
- Cinema live viewing: nationwide (Japan)
- Streaming: Hulu, ZAIKO
- Theme: Due to the COVID-19 pandemic a full Hyoen production could not be realized. Instead, LUXE was promoted as a Takarazuka Revue-style Hyoen spin-off without a strict storyline, themed around a journey around the world, featuring loosely connected vignettes.
- Direction: LUXE was directed by Kikunojo Onoe, who had previously directed Japanese dance dramas, as well as Kabuki and Takarazuka Revue works, and Ryo Harada, a Takarazuka Revue director.
- Music: Ayaka Hirahara wrote and performed the theme song live in the show. Most of the other music was written by Shoichi Tamasa.
- Choreography: Kenji Miyamoto (figure skating), Daisuke Togin (floor dance)
- Visual effects: teamLab (advanced projection mapping involving motion tracking technology and timing based on music cues)
- Notable Performers: Daisuke Takahashi (figure skater), Ayaka Hirahara (singer), Reon Yuzuki (former Takarazuka top star), Tokuma Nishioka (actor), Shizuka Arakawa (figure skater), Seiji Fukushi (actor), Kazuki Namioka (actor), Nobunari Oda (figure skater), Kanako Murakami (figure skater), Akiko Suzuki (figure skater), Kana Muramoto (figure skater), Keiji Tanaka (figure skater)

=== Hyoen 2024 - The Miracle of the Cross Star ===
- Date: June 8–11, 2024
- Venue: Yokohama Arena
- Number of shows: 4
- Duration: 150 minutes
- Live Broadcast: CS Nittelle Plus
- Cinema delayed viewing: nationwide (Japan)
- Streaming: ePlus
- Theme: The 2024 production was a loose adaptation of the classic philosophical fantasy novel, Night on the Galactic Railroad by Kenji Miyazawa. The story, revolving around a cosmic journey and exploring themes of self-sacrifice and altruism, was reimagined as a contemporary fantasy, focusing on protagonists Kakeru, a mineralogist and Tokio, an aeronautics scientist. The show featured a cast of 38 performers, combining skating, singing, and acting.
- Direction: The production was set to be directed by Amon Miyamoto again, who, due to an unspecified conflict, was replaced by Kikunojo Onoe, who had worked on all previous Hyoen productions, one month before the opening of the show.
- Music: The story was entirely told through pre-existing songs of the Japanese pop rock duo YUZU, who also performed a short set at the end of each show. Amon Miyamoto chose the songs from the band's back catalogue that suited the storyline best and Kenji Kawai rearranged and re-recorded them, adding original parts where needed. Yūjin Kitagawa, one of the two members of YUZU, was in charge of musical direction. The band also wrote a theme song specifically for the show, titled Jyujisei (engl.: Cross Star Miracle), which was subsequently released on the album Zukan (図鑑 engl.: Illustration book).
- Choreography: Kenji Miyamoto (figure skating), Akiko Suzuki (figure skating), Avecoo (floor dance)
- Acting instruction: Seiji Fukushi
- Singing/vocal coaching: Kai Hasegawa
- Visual effects: FLYD Tokyo (spatial video production)
- Notable Performers: Daisuke Takahashi (figure skater) as Kakeru, Takurō Ōno (actor) as Tokio, Kana Muramoto (figure skater) as Yuki, Kazuki Tomono (figure skater) as young Kakeru, Koshiro Shimada (figure skater) as young Tokio, Ayumi Urabe (figure skater) as young Yuki, Shizuka Arakawa (figure skater) as a "rich woman", Masahiro Ehara (actor and comedian) as the train conductor, Marie (actress and singer), Eliana (singer) and Kai Hasegawa (singer) portraying several roles, members of BLUE TOKYO, Ayumu Matsuoka of TOK¥O TRICKING MOB, YUZU

=== Hyoen 2025 - Kagamon no Yasha ===
- Date: July 5–7, 2025
- Venue: Yokohama Arena
- Number of shows: 5
- Duration: 155 minutes
- Live Broadcast: CS Nittelle Plus
- Theme: Inspired by the Ura Legend, that served as the basis for the popular Momotarō folktale, the story explored the clash of ideals between Ura (the benevolent king of the Shirakiri tribe, who befriended the villagers of Kibi no Sato and was portrayed as a demon/ogre (yasha) by the Yamato Imperial Court) and Kibitsuhiko (the model for Momotarō). Set in Okayama Prefecture, it explored themes of "justice" and "evil" against a backdrop of Japanese mythology, with a focus on dramatic confrontations and cultural motifs. The regional connection, due to Okayama being Takahashi's home Prefecture, added a personal layer.
- Direction: The production was directed by movie director Yukihiko Tsutsumi.
- Screenplay: Takuma Suehara
- Music: Rock musician SUGIZO of Luna Sea and X Japan composed the music for the entire play and performed live on guitar and violin throughout the show. SUGIZO said about his involvement in the production: "It has been my long-cherished wish for a quarter century to work with director Tsutsumi Yukihiko, whom I respect deeply as an artist. I think this rock opera that I will create with director Tsutsumi using the expressive method of ice skating will be the culmination of my musical career".
- Choreography: Kenji Miyamoto (figure skating), Kana Muramoto (figure skating)
- Movement instruction: Kikunojo Onoe
- (Visual) effects: Video production by RAM, Chūnori (wire-flying)
- Notable Performers: Daisuke Takahashi (figure skater) as Ura, Takahisa Masuda (actor and singer, member of the boy band NEWS) as Kibitsuhiko, Misato Morita (actress) as Asohime, Ryota Aoyama (actor) as Senshū, Seiji Fukushi (actor) as Yakumo, Eisaku Yoshida (actor and singer) as Shadow Emperor, Shizuka Arakawa (figure skater) as Iron Goddess, Takuma Zaiki (actor) as Tometamaomi no Mikoto, Keiji Tanaka (figure skater) as Sasamorihiko no Mikoto, Koshiro Shimada (figure skater) as Takeru Inukai, Kana Muramoto (figure skater) as Kasumi, on-screen performance by Masachika Ichimura (actor) as Darkness Swallowing God, voice performance by Keiko Toda (actress) as Iron Goddess, members of BLUE TOKYO, Ayumu Matsuoka of TOK¥O TRICKING MOB, SUGIZO

== Cultural significance ==
Hyoen pushes the boundaries of ice shows by merging figure skating with Japanese storytelling and performing arts, appealing to both skating fans and theatergoers. By adapting Japanese stories and aesthetics, Hyoen celebrates and reinterprets the country's cultural heritage, making it accessible to both domestic and international audiences.
