= Kenji Miyamoto (figure skater) =

Japanese figure skating choreographer, coach and former competitive ice dancer

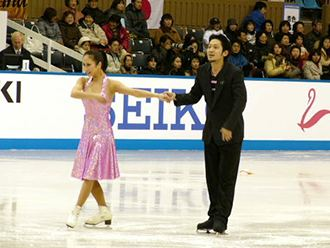
- Tsuzuki and Miyamoto in 2003.

Personal information
- Born: November 6, 1978 (age 47) Himeji, Hyōgo
- Height: 1.75 m (5 ft 9 in)

Figure skating career
- Country: Japan
- Partner: Nakako Tsuzuki, Rie Arikawa
- Coach: Muriel Zazoui, Pasquale Camerlengo, Romain Haguenauer
- Skating club: Ryukoku University
- Began skating: 1988
- Retired: 2006
Medal record
Figure skating: Ice dancing
Representing Japan
Asian Winter Games
Bronze medal – third place	2003 Aomori	Ice dancing
Silver medal – second place	1999 Gangwon	Ice dancing

Kenji Miyamoto

Japanese name
- Kanji: 宮本 賢二
- Kana: みやもと けんじ

Kenji Miyamoto (宮本 賢二, Miyamoto Kenji; born November 6, 1978 in Himeji, Hyōgo) is a Japanese figure skating choreographer, coach, and former competitive ice dancer. He skated with Rie Arikawa, winning two Japanese national titles, and then with Nakako Tsuzuki. During his career, he competed at a total of ten ISU Championships.

== Career ==
Miyamoto began learning to skate in 1988.

=== Partnership with Arikawa ===
He teamed up with Rie Arikawa no later than 1995. After winning the Japanese junior title, they were sent to the 1996 World Junior Championships in Brisbane, Australia, where they finished 22nd. The following season, they placed second at the Japan Junior Championships. They regained their national junior title before placing 16th at the 1998 World Junior Championships in Saint John, New Brunswick, Canada.

Advancing to the senior ranks, Arikawa/Miyamoto competed at their first Grand Prix events and became the national silver medalists in the 1998–1999 season. They took silver at the Asian Winter Games in South Korea and placed 9th at the 1999 Four Continents Championships in Canada.

In the 2001–2002 season, Arikawa/Miyamoto won their first senior national title and then placed 8th at the Four Continents Championships in Jeonju, South Korea. Making their only World Championships appearance, they qualified to the free dance and finished 24th overall in Nagano, Japan.

Arikawa/Miyamoto repeated as national champions the following season. In February 2003, they won the bronze medal at the Asian Winter Games in Aomori, Japan, and placed 8th at their final competition, the Four Continents Championships in Beijing, China. They were coached by Muriel Zazoui, Pasquale Camerlengo, Romain Haguenauer in Lyon, France.

=== Partnership with Tsuzuki ===
Later in 2003, Miyamoto formed a partnership with Nakako Tsuzuki. During their three-season partnership, they competed together at six Grand Prix events and placed in the top ten at three Four Continents Championships. They were coached by Muriel Zazoui in Lyon, France.

They both retired from competitive skating following the 2005–2006 season.

=== Post-competitive career ===
Miyamoto became a choreographer for ice shows (most notably for Friends on Ice, Hyoen, Ice Explosion and Ice Brave) and competitive skaters. He also did the choreography and provided motion capture for the figure skating anime, Yuri on Ice.

He has choreographed for the following skaters:

- Miki Ando
- Shizuka Arakawa
- Mao Asada
- Hana Bath
- Cha Jun-hwan
- Mone Chiba
- Choi Da-bin
- Maria Egawa
- Javier Fernández
- Yuzuru Hanyu
- Tomoki Hiwatashi
- Marin Honda
- Marin Honda / Shoma Uno
- Rika Hongo
- Haru Kakiuchi
- Takeru Amine Kataise
- Kim Hae-jin
- Kim Jin-seo
- Takahiko Kozuka
- Tatsuki Machida
- Yura Matsuda
- Rino Matsuike
- Akari Matsuoka
- Kao Miura
- Satoko Miyahara
- Sena Miyake
- Yuka Nagai
- Ami Nakai
- Shunsuke Nakamura
- Yukari Nakano
- Miyu Nakashio
- Rio Nakata
- Yasuharu Nanri
- Yuki Nishino
- Shingo Nishiyama
- Miyabi Oba
- Nobunari Oda
- Mei Okada
- Shotaro Omori
- Promsan Rattanadilok Na Phuket
- Kosho Oshima
- Kevin Reynolds
- Shun Sato
- Koshiro Shimada
- Risa Shoji
- Rion Sumiyoshi
- Tsudoi Suto
- Akiko Suzuki
- Yo Takagi
- Daisuke Takahashi
- Sena Takahashi
- Keiji Tanaka
- Tatsuya Tsuboi
- Shoma Uno
- Kaoruko Wada
- Rinka Watanabe
- Sōta Yamamoto
- Kaho Yamashita / Yuto Nagata
- Mako Yamashita
- Nozomu Yoshioka

Additionally, Miyamoto has his own TV segment titled, KENJI's Room, on the J Sports channel, where he conducts interviews with fellow Japanese figure skaters.

== Programs ==
=== With Tsuzuki ===
Season	Original dance	Free dance
2005–2006	Samba; Rhumba; Mambo	House of Flying Daggers by Shigeru Umebayashi
2004–2005	Charleston; Slow foxtrot; Quickstep	Tango; Quidam (from Cirque du Soleil)
2003–2004	Boogie-woogie; Blues; Boogie-woogie	The Prince of Egypt by Hans Zimmer

=== With Arikawa ===
Season	Original dance	Free dance
2002–2003	Waltz: Aquarellen by Josef Strauss performed by the Vienna Philharmonic; Polka	Conan the Barbarian by Basil Poledouris
2001–2002	Tango: Tango del Atardecer by Lalo Schifrin; Flamenco: Fiesta de Jerez by Carmen Amaya	Kojiki by Kitarō

== Results ==
GP: Grand Prix

=== With Tsuzuki ===
International
Event	03–04	04–05	05–06
Four Continents Championships	9th	8th	8th
GP Cup of Russia	11th		11th
GP NHK Trophy	10th	9th	11th
GP Trophée Éric Bompard		11th	
National
Japan Championships	2nd	2nd	2nd

=== With Arikawa ===
International
Event	95–96	96–97	97–98	98–99	99–00	00–01	01–02	02–03
Worlds							24th	
Four Continents				9th	11th		8th	8th
GP Lalique						12th		
GP NHK Trophy				9th	9th		9th	11th
GP Sparkassen					9th			
GP Skate America				9th				
GP Skate Canada						10th		
Asian Games				2nd				3rd
International: Junior
Junior Worlds	22nd		16th					
National
Japan				2nd	3rd	3rd	1st	1st
Japan Junior	1st	2nd	1st					
