= Daisuke Takahashi =

Japanese figure skater (born 1986)

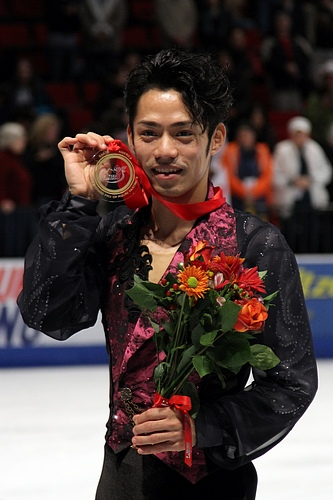
- Takahashi at the 2010 Skate America

Personal information
- Native name: 高橋 大輔
- Nickname: Dai-chan (nickname)
- Born: March 16, 1986 (age 40) Kurashiki, Okayama, Japan
- Education: Kansai University (2015)
- Occupations: Professional figure skater; Ice show producer; Actor
- Height: 165 cm (5 ft 5 in)

Figure skating career
- Country: Japan
- Discipline: Ice dance (2020–2023); Men's singles (until 2019)
- Partner: Kana Muramoto
- Coach: Marina Zueva; Ilia Tkachenko; Johnny Johns; Utako Nagamitsu; Takeshi Honda; Nikolai Morozov
- Skating club: Kansai Univ. Kaisers FSC
- Began skating: 1994
- Competitive: 1997–2014, 2018–2023
- Professional: 2014–2018, 2023–present
- Retired: 2023
- Highest WS: 1st (singles, 2008, 2011); 13th (ice dance, 2023)
Event	Gold medal – first place	Silver medal – second place	Bronze medal – third place
Olympic Games	0	0	1
World Championships	1	2	0
Four Continents Championships	2	2	1
Grand Prix Final	1	3	1
Japan Championships	6	4	2
World Team Trophy	1	0	2
World Junior Championships	1	0	0
Medal list
Olympic Games
Bronze medal – third place	2010 Vancouver	Singles
World Championships
Gold medal – first place	2010 Turin	Singles
Silver medal – second place	2007 Tokyo	Singles
Silver medal – second place	2012 Nice	Singles
Four Continents Championships
Gold medal – first place	2008 Goyang	Singles
Gold medal – first place	2011 Taipei	Singles
Silver medal – second place	2012 Colorado Springs	Singles
Silver medal – second place	2022 Tallinn	Ice dance
Bronze medal – third place	2005 Gangneung	Singles
Grand Prix Final
Gold medal – first place	2012–13 Sochi	Singles
Silver medal – second place	2006–07 Saint Petersburg	Singles
Silver medal – second place	2007–08 Turin	Singles
Silver medal – second place	2011–12 Quebec	Singles
Bronze medal – third place	2005–06 Tokyo	Singles
Japan Championships
Gold medal – first place	2005–06 Tokyo	Singles
Gold medal – first place	2006–07 Nagoya	Singles
Gold medal – first place	2007–08 Osaka	Singles
Gold medal – first place	2009–10 Osaka	Singles
Gold medal – first place	2011–12 Osaka	Singles
Gold medal – first place	2022–23 Osaka	Ice dance
Silver medal – second place	2012–13 Sapporo	Singles
Silver medal – second place	2018–19 Osaka	Singles
Silver medal – second place	2020–21 Nagano	Ice dance
Silver medal – second place	2021–22 Saitama	Ice dance
Bronze medal – third place	2003–04 Nagano	Singles
Bronze medal – third place	2010–11 Nagano	Singles
World Team Trophy
Gold medal – first place	2012 Tokyo	Team
Bronze medal – third place	2013 Tokyo	Team
Bronze medal – third place	2023 Tokyo	Team
World Junior Championships
Gold medal – first place	2002 Hamar	Singles

Daisuke Takahashi (高橋 大輔, Takahashi Daisuke; born March 16, 1986) is a Japanese figure skater (men's singles and ice dance), ice show producer and actor. As a singles skater, he is the 2010 Olympic bronze medalist, the 2010 World champion, the 2012–13 Grand Prix Final champion, a two-time (2008, 2011) Four Continents champion, and a five-time (2006–2008, 2010, 2012) Japanese national champion.

Takahashi represented Japan at the 2006 Winter Olympics, 2010 Winter Olympics, and 2014 Winter Olympics. His bronze medal at the 2010 Winter Olympics was the first Olympic medal for an Asian country in the men's singles event. He was also the first Asian man to win a World title at the 2010 World Championships. At the 2012–13 Grand Prix Final, Takahashi made history again as the first Asian man to win a gold medal in the event, an addition to his previous accomplishment of being the first Japanese man to medal at the event in 2005.

Takahashi retired on October 14, 2014, but returned to competitive skating on July 1, 2018. After two seasons competing domestically in Japan, Takahashi began a career in ice dance partnered with Kana Muramoto beginning in the 2020–21 season. With Muramoto he is the 2022 Four Continents silver medalist, the 2022–23 Japanese national champion and the 2022 Denis Ten Memorial Challenge champion. Takahashi is the first and at present only competitor to have earned medals at the Four Continents Figure Skating Championships in two different disciplines.

Although he has struggled with the lingering effects of an anterior cruciate ligament rupture since 2008, his senior career spanned 16 seasons in singles skating and ice dance combined, which is well above the average senior career length in any discipline in the era of the ISU Judging System.

Takahashi, a pioneer of men's singles skating in Japan and Asia, is also known and admired for his unique style, and has been be cited as an inspiration by his peers including as Patrick Chan, Tatsuki Machida, Adam Rippon or Tomáš Verner as well as by skaters of younger generations such as Shoma Uno, Denis Ten, Cha Jun-hwan, Jason Brown, Deniss Vasiljevs, Misha Ge, Lewis Gibson, Jimmy Ma or Kazuki Tomono.

Outside of the competitive field Takahashi has been a key individual in innovating the Japanese ice show market by headlining Hyoen, a new cross-genre show format, which combines figure skating and Japanese culture (incorporating several genres, such as kabuki, the Takarazuka Revue, musicals and literature) and by producing Kassouya, an ensemble show that provides performance opportunities for and nurtures young figure skaters.

In addition to performing in ice shows, he has also appeared as a dancer in Cheryl Burke's stage production Love on the Floor.

In July/August 2024 he made his acting debut in the movie Kura no Aru Machi (蔵のある街) (engl. The Tales of Kurashiki), written and directed by Emiko Hiramatsu. The movie is scheduled to be released in cinemas nationwide in the summer of 2025.

For October 2025 he is scheduled to make his stage acting debut at the Nagoya Odori NEO festival.

== Career ==
=== Early career ===
Born in Kurashiki, Okayama Prefecture, Japan, Takahashi began figure skating when he was eight years old. When a skating rink was built near his house, he went with his mother to watch the skaters at the rink and, afterward, enrolled in the figure skating club. His mother intended for him to enroll in the ice hockey club, but he did not like the protective gear of ice hockey and enrolled instead in the figure skating club.

Takahashi had a successful junior career, winning the 2002 World Junior Championships in his first and only appearance at that competition. Takahashi is the first Japanese man to have won the title.

=== Senior career ===
==== Senior debut ====
For the 2002–03 season, Takahashi turned senior. He struggled with consistency during the first few years of his senior career. In 2004, he moved to Osaka to attend university – the university built a rink for him and other elite skaters.

Takahashi won a bronze medal at the 2005 Four Continents Championships and went on to the 2005 World Championships as the second-ranked of the two Japanese men on the World team, after Takeshi Honda. However, when Honda was forced to withdraw due to injury, it fell on Takahashi to qualify spots for Japan at the 2006 Winter Olympics. Takahashi placed 15th, qualifying only one spot for the Japanese men.

==== 2005–06 season ====
Takahashi won his first Grand Prix Assignment of the season, 2005 Skate America, and won the bronze medal at the 2005 NHK Trophy, and thus, qualified for the 2005–2006 Grand Prix Final where he placed third, becoming the first Japanese man to medal at the event.

The selection criteria for the allocation of Olympic spots considered "retained points" from the 2004–2005 season (70% of the athlete's best international competition results) as well as the points calculated from the athletes' top two international competition results of the 2005–2006 season and the 2005–06 Japanese Championships.

Takahashi and Nobunari Oda, who had turned senior in the 2005–06 season and emerged as a challenger for Japan's sole men's Olympic spot, both had very good Grand Prix seasons. However, due to the points accumulated in the previous season, Takahashi was the first choice for the Olympic berth, even if he would not go on to win the final ranking competition, the 2005–06 Japanese Championships.

At the 2005–06 Japanese Championships, Oda was initially declared the winner, but his gold medal was revoked when a glitch in the calculation of scores in the event's computer system was discovered. The reason for the error lay in Oda's first jump combination, a combination of triple Axel, triple toe loop and triple loop. The last jump of the combination, the triple loop, was initially incorrectly identified as a double jump, but was later corrected to an under-rotated triple jump attempt.

This is where the Zayak rule came into play, which says that in a free skate "of all triple and quadruple jumps only two can be executed twice." Oda had performed two triple toe loops and two triple Lutzes, and since he had also performed a triple loop and the loop at the end of his first combination jump was corrected to an under-rotated attempt at another triple, he had performed three triple jumps twice. As a result, the score for the second triple lutz was invalidated. The rankings were reversed and Takahashi was awarded the gold.

However, due to both skaters' strong results during the 2005–2006 season, the Japanese Skating Federation split the international assignments, giving Takahashi the Olympic berth and Oda a place at the World Championship. At the 2006 Winter Olympics, Takahashi was in a good position after the short program but had a poor free skate and placed 8th overall.

==== 2006–07 season ====
In the 2006–07 competitive season, Takahashi won a silver medal at 2006 Skate Canada International, then gold at the 2006 NHK Trophy. He qualified for the Grand Prix Final and won the silver medal, although he was ill. He won the Japanese Championships, taking the national title for the second year in a row, and then went on to the Winter Universiade in Turin, Italy, which he won as well.

Takahashi placed third in the short program at the 2007 World Championships. In the free skate, he skated the performance of his life in his home country, placing first in that segment and ending up winning the silver medal, trailing Brian Joubert narrowly. It was the first silver medal for Japan in the men's event at Worlds. Together with Oda, who placed seventh, Takahashi secured 3 spots for the 2008 World Championships.

Following that season, the ISU ranked Takahashi first in the world. However, over the summer, the ISU tweaked its scoring criteria. Takahashi had been placed on top, just ahead of Brian Joubert, partly due to Takahashi's victory at the Winter Universiade, a competition for which Brian Joubert was not eligible, as Joubert was not a university student. The ISU determined that the results of the Winter Universiade could not be used to calculate world ranking, and Takahashi's ranking fell from first to second place.

==== 2007–08 season ====
In the 2007–08 season, he won gold at both his Grand Prix events and then silver at the Grand Prix Final behind Stéphane Lambiel. A few weeks later, he won his third Japanese national title and was named to the Four Continents and Worlds teams.

Takahashi won the 2008 Four Continents Championships, scoring a new record in the free skate (175.84) and in the total score (264.41) under the ISU Judging System.

He was considered a favorite heading into the 2008 World Championships but finished off the podium after a disappointing free skate in which he fell on his second quad toe attempt, then stumbled on a triple Axel and triple loop, and, finally, performed an extra combination, an invalid element, which did not count towards his points total. Placing fourth overall, he and Takahiko Kozuka, who placed eighth, were able to maintain three spots for the Japanese men at the 2009 World Championships.

In May 2008, Takahashi announced that he had parted ways with Nikolai Morozov, who had been his co-coach for several years in Hackensack, New Jersey. Morozov explained the split by stating that he could no longer coach Takahashi due to problems with Takahashi's new agent. Takahashi continued training under coach Utako Nagamitsu and jump coach Takeshi Honda in Osaka, Japan.

==== 2008–09 season ====
Takahashi was originally assigned to the 2008 Cup of China and the 2008 NHK Trophy for the 2008–09 Grand Prix season. He had to withdraw after suffering a torn ACL in his right knee on October 31, 2008, only a few days before his first event. It was later reported that Takahashi would undergo surgery to repair ligament damage and his right meniscus and would miss the entire 2008–09 season. A bolt was inserted into his right knee. He was able to return to the ice in April and began practicing jumps in June.

==== 2009–10 season ====
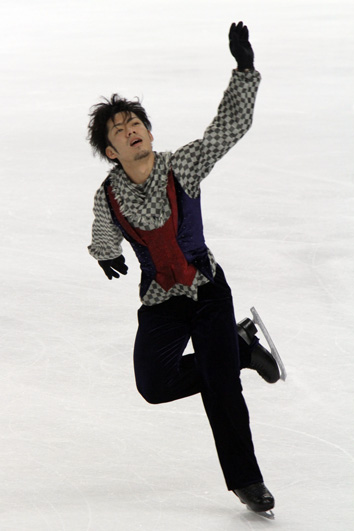
Takahashi at the 2010 World Championships.

After recovering from the surgery and returning to training normally, Takahashi began the Olympic season at the 2009 Finlandia Trophy, which he won. For the Grand Prix season, he was assigned to compete at the 2009 Skate Canada International and 2009 NHK Trophy. He placed second at Skate Canada and fourth at the NHK Trophy. Those placements qualified him to compete in the Grand Prix Final. At the final, he led after the short program with a new personal best of 89.95 but was fifth in the free skate and fifth overall.

He won his fourth national title at the 2009–10 Japanese Championships. At the 2010 Winter Olympics, Takahashi won the bronze medal with a score of 247.43. It was the first Olympic medal to be won by a male figure skater representing an Asian country. Takahashi said about his historic achievement: "I was so happy I was in tears. I am not normally like that. The Olympics are very special. I saw the same faces at the venue that I see at other competitions, but the atmosphere was totally different. There was a lot of pressure on everyone so I am very proud that I did my best under those conditions." He said about standing on the Olympic podium: "That feeling was something I never felt before. I was thinking about all of the time I had invested to get onto that podium and all the people who had helped me realize that dream."

Takahashi went on to dominate the men’s event at the 2010 World Championships in Turin, Italy with two outstanding performances. He won the gold medal with a combined total of 257.70, more than 10 points over his nearest rival, becoming the first Asian to win a world championship in men's singles. Takahashi’s jump coach, 2002 and 2003 World bronze medalist Takeshi Honda, said: "Daisuke’s victory was a big step forward for Japanese men’s skating. I was very happy for him because I see him train so hard every day."

At this competition, Takahashi attempted a quadruple flip, marking the first attempt of this jump at an ISU sanctioned competition, but underrotated it and two-footed the landing. Together with Kozuka's result, who placed tenth, three spots were maintained for the 2011 World Championships.

Upon his return from Turin a parade was held in his hometown of Kurashiki to celebrate his historic achievements. Takahashi said about the reception he received when he returned home from Italy: "I did not realize it when I was in Torino, but my victory was bigger news in Japan than I thought. I was very surprised about that." Together with Mao Asada he was also invited to a garden party held by the Emperor and Empress of Japan to honour the achievements of all of the Japanese athletes, who medaled at the 2010 Winter Olympics.

==== 2010–11 season ====
Takahashi's 2010–11 ISU Grand Prix events were the NHK Trophy and Skate America. At the 2010 NHK Trophy, he placed first with 234.79 points, 16.60 ahead of silver medalist Jeremy Abbott. Takahashi also won 2010 Skate America despite having a flawed short program and the free skate. During a practice session at the Grand Prix Final, Takahiko Kozuka inadvertently collided with him while Takahashi was doing his run-through; Takahashi said, "it wasn't such a serious injury, just a bit of bruising. [...] It was the first time for me (to be involved in such an accident). I was surprised, but there was no malice involved." Takahashi placed third in short program. In the free skate, he attempted a quad flip but landed it two-footed. Multiple problems, including low levels on two spins, resulted in a sixth-place finish in that segment, dropping him to fourth overall.

Takahashi won the bronze medal at the 2010–11 Japanese Championships. Takahashi won the 2011 Four Continents Championships. At the 2011 World Championships, he was third in the short program but finished in fifth overall. In the free skate, a screw in his boot came loose on his first element, a quad toe. The Japanese team was able to get it fixed within the three minutes allowed, and he resumed his program. He said it may occur at any time regardless of inspections, which his coach does daily, and he does not blame her. Takahashi and Kozuka, who had earned the silver medal, once again managed to secure three spots for the Japanese men at the 2012 World Championships.

On May 19, Takahashi underwent surgery to remove a bolt in his right knee stemming from surgery in late 2008. Following the surgery, he said, "It is thinner around my knee, but I feel better now that there is nothing inside my body. I might be imagining it, but it feels lighter."

==== 2011–12 season ====
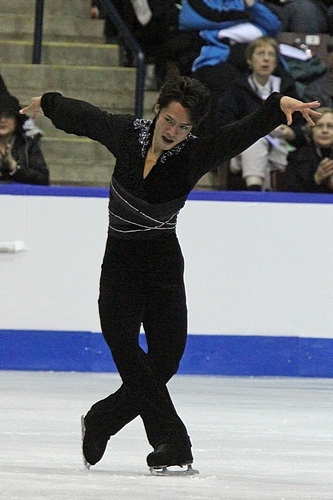
Takahashi at the 2011 Skate Canada International.

As part of his preparation for the 2011–12 season, Takahashi spent two weeks in August 2011 working with ice dancing specialists Muriel Boucher-Zazoui, Romain Haguenauer, and Olivier Schoenfelder in Lyon, France, to hone his skating skills. He said, "I wanted to improve my skating technique, not because I was bad in this sector, but I think Olivier is the best. I love the way he skates."

At 2011 Skate Canada International, Takahashi earned a score of 84.66 in the short program and 153.21 in the free skate to win the bronze medal with a combined score of 237.87. At the 2011 NHK Trophy, he earned a new personal best score of 90.43 to take the lead in the short program, with a 10.66 point lead over teammate Takahiko Kozuka. He won the gold medal with a combined total of 259.75 points and qualified for the Grand Prix Final. He finished second at the Final. At the Japanese Championships, Takahashi was first after the short program with a score of 96.05 and placed third in the free skate, scoring 158.38 points. With a total score of 254.60, he won his fifth national title, finishing ahead of Takahiko Kozuka and Yuzuru Hanyu, and was selected to compete at the 2012 World Championships, where he won the silver medal. The French crowd believed he deserved the gold medal over Patrick Chan, who had mistakes, including a fall on a double Axel, and booed the final result. Takahashi stated that he was pleased with the result, which he had not expected after his off-season surgery. Takahashi finished the season at the 2012 World Team Trophy. He set new personal best scores in the short program, the free skate, and overall, and finished first in the men's event. His short program score, 94.00, set a new record as the highest ever under the ISU Judging System. It was Takahashi's first win over Patrick Chan since the 2010 World Championships.

On June 15, 2012, Takahashi confirmed that he would resume working with Morozov – Nagamitsu remained his primary coach, and Morozov became his advisory coach.

==== 2012–13 season ====
Takahashi presented his new free skate for the season at the 2012 Japan Open. It was the first time since his injury that he performed two quad jumps in his free skate. He placed first in the men's event, and Japan took the team gold medal. He switched to new skating boots just after returning from training in the U.S. in October. This affected his practice schedule leading up to his Grand Prix events. Takahashi said: "The shoes happened to be uncomfortable beyond my expectations, which attributed to difficulty in blade adjustments. As a result, I was not able to practice as I had scheduled." At the 2012 Cup of China, his first Grand Prix event of the season, he won the silver medal behind Tatsuki Machida. Takahashi won the silver medal at his next Grand Prix event, the 2012 NHK Trophy, and qualified for his seventh Grand Prix Final. The 2012 Grand Prix Final took place in Sochi, Russia at the planned 2014 Winter Olympics rink. Takahashi placed first in the short program, third in the free skate, and won his first GPF gold medal. He is also the first Japanese man ever to win a gold medal at the Grand Prix Final.

At the Japanese Championships, six strong competitors fought for three available spots on the Japanese men's world team. Takahashi came in second in the short program, nine points behind Yuzuru Hanyu. Takahashi was first in the free skate but finished second overall. He was named to the Japanese team for the 2013 Four Continents Championships, held in Takahashi's current hometown, and the 2013 World Championships.

Takahashi announced he would change his short program to Moonlight Sonata. With roughly a month to prepare the new program, Takahashi said he was still trying to "feel" the music with his body. He was 4th in the short program, 8th in the free skate, and finished 7th overall at the Four Continents Championships. Takahashi was also 4th in the short program and 8th in the free skate at the World Championships, finishing sixth overall and thus securing three spots for the Japanese men's team at the 2014 Olympics and 2014 World Championships, together with Hanyu, who placed fourth.

==== 2013–14 season ====
In the 2013–14 ISU Grand Prix season, Takahashi placed 4th at 2013 Skate America before winning the 2013 NHK Trophy for the fifth and final time and thus qualifying for the Grand Prix Final, from which he had to withdraw due to an injury, a shinbone bruise, he sustained on November 26. He was replaced by compatriot Nobunari Oda, who was the first alternate.

At the Japanese Championships, not having recovered from the injury, he placed 4th in the short program and 5th in the free skate to place 5th overall. Due to satisfying multiple selection criteria over other contenders, including ISU World Standings and ISU Season's Best Score, he was named to the Sochi Olympic team.

At the Olympics, he finished 4th in the short program and 6th in the free skate to finish 6th overall, with a total score of 250.67. He was originally slated to compete at the 2014 World Championships in Saitama, Japan, but pulled out due to lingering effects of his injury.

Takahashi announced his retirement from competitive skating in October 2014.

==== 2018–19 season ====
Takahashi announced his intent to return to competitive skating at the start of the 2018–19 season. Asked for his goal/reason for coming out of retirement, he replied: "I have decided that I want to live as a skating performer, so my goal is to perform the best I can until I feel I have reached my limits. To be able to do so, I see this return to active competition as the start. I haven't thought about my goals as an active skater yet. However, in terms of goals for the future, I think the time I can perform is short (due to my age), and I don't know what the future holds for figure skating, and I don't know how long I'll have a place to skate, but as long as I have the opportunity, I want to show my best performances in ice shows. After that, if there is anything I can do to help the younger skaters involved in skating, I would like to support them. I tried out different talking jobs (as a newscaster, etc.), but I've come to realise that I don't have the talent for that. I think that I'm better suited to expressing myself through my body, regardless of whether I have talent or not. I've come to realise that people have their own strengths and weaknesses, so I want to rebuild my body again… When I went to New York, I didn’t skate for months and just quit completely. If I had kept performing in shows after retiring, I probably wouldn’t have ended up like this, but I realised that it takes time to get back to that level."

At the 2018–19 Japan Championships he placed second behind Shoma Uno, but declined offers of international assignments.

==== 2019–20 season ====
In September 2019, Takahashi announced that he would finish his competitive singles career that season and switch to competing in ice dance with partner Kana Muramoto. He finished twelfth at the 2019–20 Japan Championships, his last appearance in singles competition, where fans and skating officials gave him a standing ovation after his free skate as a sendoff, paying tribute to his extraordinary achievements as a trailblazer in men's singles skating for Japan.

==== 2020–21 season ====
Following the conclusion of his singles career, Takahashi began training with Muramoto in Florida under Marina Zoueva, the coach of Olympic champions Virtue/Moir and Davis/White. Takahashi's star status in Japan made his decision to switch to ice dance a point of considerable interest in the country's media and figure skating audience.

Due to the COVID-19 pandemic, the Grand Prix was assigned based primarily on geographic location. Muramoto/Takahashi nevertheless traveled from Florida to Japan to make their debut at the 2020 NHK Trophy, in a field consisting of three Japanese dance teams. They were second in the rhythm dance, six points behind the reigning national champions, Komatsubara/Koleto and narrowly ahead of reigning national silver medalists Fukase/Cho. They placed third in the free dance, winning the bronze medal overall. Muramoto said she felt they could do better at their next competition.

Making their Japan Championships debut, Muramoto/Takahashi placed second in the rhythm dance, less than four points behind Komatsubara/Koleto. They dropped to third in the free dance, but won the silver medal overall. They were named as first alternates to the World team. In February, they were forced to withdraw as alternates due to a knee injury from Muramoto and were replaced by bronze medalists Fukase/Cho.

==== 2021–22 season ====
Muramoto/Takahashi were again assigned to begin the season at the 2021 NHK Trophy, their lone assignment on the Grand Prix for the year. Sixth in both segments, they were sixth overall, defeating domestic rivals Komatsubara/Koleto by 7.30 points. Both expressed satisfaction with the results, but Takahashi said, "there is still a large gap we want to close to the top teams." They went on to win a silver medal at the 2021 CS Warsaw Cup.

The 2021–22 Japan Championships, the final national qualification event for the 2022 Winter Olympics, pitted Muramoto/Takahashi against Komatsubara/Koleto for the second time that season. Muramoto and Takahashi both fell in the rhythm dance, as a result placing second in that segment, five points back of their rivals. They won the free dance but took the silver medal overall for the second consecutive year and were subsequently named as alternates for the Japanese Olympic team. They were instead assigned to make their World Championship debut later in the season and were named to compete at the Four Continents Championships as well.

Muramoto/Takahashi won the silver medal at Four Continents, placing second in both segments. Takahashi became the first person to win Four Continents medals in two different disciplines and said he could "hardly put my joy into words" but that he had been frustrated with the mistake.

The team concluded the season at the 2022 World Championships, held in Montpellier with Russian dance teams absent due to the International Skating Union banning all Russian athletes due to their country's invasion of Ukraine. Qualifying to the free dance, Muramoto/Takahashi finished sixteenth.

==== 2022–23 season ====
At the end of May, Muramoto/Takahashi confirmed that they would continue through the 2022–2023 season.

After a sixth-place finish at the 2022 Skate America, they went on to compete at the 2022 CS Denis Ten Memorial Challenge, where they earned their first gold medal as a team. They then finished sixth at the 2022 NHK Trophy, their second Grand Prix.

At the 2022–23 Japan Championships, Muramoto/Takahashi became national champions for the first time and were subsequently named to compete at the 2023 World Championships and at the 2023 Four Continents Championships.

The team encountered difficulties at the Four Continents Championships, beginning in the rhythm dance, where Muramoto fell in the midst of their midline step sequence. Takahashi fell twice in the second half of their free dance. They finished ninth at the event.

At the 2023 World Championships, which were held on home ice in Saitama, Muramoto/Takahashi notably finished eleventh, which, tied with Muramoto/Reed in 2018, meant the highest placement of a Japanese ice dance team at a World Championships. They also achieved a personal best in the free dance. Takahashi said afterward that "today's performance really gave me the meaning to continue for a year. I have grown and experienced a lot in this past year."

Muramoto/Takahashi were Team Japan's dance entry at the 2023 World Team Trophy, coming fourth in the rhythm dance. They were fifth in the free dance, setting a new personal best in the segment and in total score. Team Japan won the bronze medal. Muramoto said that they were undecided about continuing for another year and would discuss it while touring. They announced their joint decision to retire in May 2023. Takahashi explained that he was unable to put any further strain on his long-term knee injury and therefore saw no opportunity to continue his athletic development. Muramoto decided to retire with him to pursue a professional show career together.

== Post-competitive career ==
After his first retirement from competitive figure skating in October 2014, Takahashi mainly performed in ice shows such as the new Japanese production Hyoen, Art on Ice and Ice Legends in Switzerland, Denis Ten and Friends in Kazakhstan, The Ice, Shizuka Arakawa's Friends on Ice and Stars on Ice Japan and worked as a reporter and sports caster for Fuji tv, hosting, among other things, a segment called Spotlight, for which he interviewed professionals and artists from various fields such as movie director and visual effects supervisor Takashi Yamazaki, actor Nomura Mansai or photographer Mika Ninagawa. Together with triple Olympic champion, retired judoka Tadahiro Nomura, he reported live from the 2016 Summer Olympics in Rio and the 2018 Winter Olympics in Pyeongchang. He also appeared as a guest on numerous talk and variety shows.

In 2016 Takahashi took part in a test-run for the fusion of projection mapping and figure skating, performed to the song GIFT by Japanese pop rock band Mr. Children. The technology was subsequently implemented in the new innovative cross-genre show Hyoen – Basara (2017), starring Takahashi, kabuki actor Ichikawa Somegoro VII (now Matsumoto Kōshirō X) and retired singles figure skater and Olympic champion Shizuka Arakawa. This marked the first time projection mapping was used in a Japanese ice show.

In 2016 and 2017 Takahashi performed as a main dancer alongside retired singles figure skater Kristi Yamaguchi, retired ice dancers Meryl Davis and Charlie White as well as an ensemble consisting of professional dancers in Cheryl Burke's (Dancing with the Stars) stage production Love on the Floor. Burke praised Takahashi: "When I heard that Daisuke would love to be a part of 'Love on the Floor,' I was just so blown away that he would even want to do something like this … [and] the fact that he is able to take on such an amazing challenge, and be so ready and willing to do it. I've seen him dance and grow as an artist – he is already such an amazing dancer. I have a lot of experience working with celebrities with no dance experience, and I tell you – if he were ever to do ‘Dancing with the Stars’ here in America, he would win hands down." The premiere was attended by world-renowned ballet dancer Tetsuya Kumakawa, actor Junichi Ishida and ballet dancer and actor Shuntaro Miyao, among others. Kumakawa offered his support, saying, "He has a gentle personality, but on the ice, Takahashi Daisuke has a wonderful charisma that I really relate to. I'm looking forward to a performance that will really bring out Daisuke's talent. I hope that he will become a dancer and leader in Japan." The show was held at the TOKYU THEATRE Orb. During its 2016 run it grossed over two million dollars in ticket sales in ten sold out shows.

In 2018 Takahashi took on his first project (called D-color) as 'total coordinator' for his sponsor, real estate company Sky Court Ltd, designing the interior and exterior of a 13-storey condominium building in Asakusa, Tokyo.

Following his second retirement in May 2023, Takahashi has performed solo and with Muramoto in ice shows such as Hyoen – The Miracle of the Cross Star, Hyoen – Mirror-Patterned Demon, Prince Ice World, Friends on Ice, Stars on Ice Japan and The Ice. In February 2024, he produced the first edition of his own ice show Kassouya, having already made his debut as producer for the second edition of his show Ice Explosion in January 2023. The second edition of Kassouya took place in March 2025 with a third edition planned for spring 2026.

In 2024 Takahashi co-choreographed the program Symmetry with Muramoto, which they debuted during the Prince Ice World – Broadway Rocks! tour. For Friends on Ice 2024 he choreographed his solo show program Wake up, you're dreaming.

In April 2024 Takahashi completed his third D-color project for the 55th Anniversary of Sky Court Ltd, designing the interior of a one-room apartment.

Since April 2024, he has co-hosted the variety show Poka Poka (ぽかぽか) on Fuji tv on Thursdays.

In July/August 2024 he made his acting debut in the movie Kura no Aru Machi (蔵のある街) (engl. The Tales of Kurashiki), written and directed by Emiko Hiramatsu, which is set and was entirely filmed in Takahashi's hometown of Kurashiki, Okayama Prefecture. In the film, he plays a curator of a local museum who becomes the confidant of the main characters, high school students Aoi Nanba and Beniko Shiraga, portrayed by Soma Santoki and Runa Nakashima. Director Emiko Hiramatsu on why she cast Takahashi: "I really wanted an actor with name recognition for this important role. So while I was wondering what to do, just by chance, I saw a program on NHK where Mr. Takahashi was being interviewed. And I instantly knew I didn't have to worry anymore. It was such a perfect match that I thought that his speaking style, mannerisms, and atmosphere were so perfect that I thought that was all I needed. And he's also from Kurashiki." Takahashi reflected on his first movie acting experience: "My honest impression is that I am grateful for the opportunity to participate in a film production despite having no acting experience. Although it was challenging and difficult, the experience made me realise that I enjoy acting. I would like to continue participating in similar projects in the future. In addition to acting itself, I truly enjoy the process of collaborating with others to create a work of art." The movie is scheduled to be released in cinemas nationwide on August 22, 2025.

In October 2024 he was announced as the recipient of the "Suits of the Year 2024" award in the sports category, "which focuses on people who have achieved results through their spirit of challenge and fair play and are admired around the world". The award is sponsored by The Nikkei Magazine, a media business of the Nihon Keizai Shimbun, and recognizes "people who have the talent and ambition to take on challenges with passion in business or their own field and change the times." The awards ceremony took place on November 13, 2024.

In October 2024 Takahashi founded the members-only official fan community F-Ske on the platform Fanicon together with Shizuka Arakawa, his ice dance partner Kana Muramoto, Takahito Mura, Kazuki Tomono, Keiji Tanaka, Yuna Aoki, Kosho Oshima, Yuto Kishina and Rena Uezono.

For October 2025 he is scheduled to make his stage acting debut in the Japanese dance drama Genroku Chûshingura at the Nagoya Odori NEO festival.

== Notable show appearances ==
Takahashi has performed in numerous (ice) shows in Japan and abroad. Because of the high number of appearances, only the most notable ones are listed below.

For further information about the Hyoen series see the main article: Hyoen

Producer and performer

- Ice Explosion (Japan) (2023)
- Kassouya (Japan) (2024–2026)

Headliner / Chairperson

- Kobe charity show (Japan) (2011–2015)
- Christmas on Ice (Japan) (2014–2018)
- Hyoen (Japan) (2017, 2019, 2024, 2025)
- Ice Explosion (Japan) (2020)
- LUXE (Japan) (2021)

Dancer

- Love on the Floor (Japan) (2016, 2017)

Stage Actor

- Genroku Chûshingura (Japan) (2025)

Cast member

- Prince Ice World (Japan) (2006–08, 2010–14, 2016, 2018–19, 2023–25)
- Friends on Ice (Japan) (2006–2014, 2016–17, 2019, 2022–25)
- Stars sur glace (France) (2007)
- The Ice (Japan) (2007, 2016–17, 2023)
- Stars on Ice (Japan) (2007–08, 2010–13, 2015–16, 2022, 2025)
- Festa on Ice (South Korea) (2008)
- Carnival on Ice (Japan) (2008–13, 2016–17)
- Fantasy on Ice (Japan) (2011, 2014)
- Art on Ice (China) (2012)
- Art on Ice (Japan) (2013)
- Denis Ten and Friends (Kazakhstan) (2014)
- Art on Ice (Switzerland) (2015, 2017)
- Ice Legends (Switzerland) (2016)
- Golden Moment (Hawaii) (2017)
- Bloom on Ice (Japan) (2023, 2024)

== Filmography ==
- The Tales of Kurashiki (2025)

== Personal life ==
Takahashi was a student at Kansai University, along with Nobunari Oda. He has three elder brothers.

After initially retiring from figure skating, Takahashi moved to Long Island, New York, where he enrolled in English classes at a local university. During his stay he also studied several dance styles at the Broadway Dance Center.

In January 2023, Takahashi announced that he had changed the spelling of his name from 髙橋 大輔 to 高橋 大輔.

In 2023 Takahashi moved from Osaka to Tokyo.

== Public life and endorsements ==
With the silver medal at the 2007 Worlds, Takahashi made many media appearances and performed in many ice shows in Japan. He was also invited to the French team's show Stars sur glace (Stars On Ice) in Paris. In 2008, he performed at Festa On Ice in South Korea.

In July 2007, the Japanese Olympic Committee selected Takahashi as one of the "JOC symbol athletes" (JOC paid about 20 million yen per year to the symbol athletes for the image rights. JOC partner companies can use images of JOC Symbol Athletes for free). The program provided him with funding from JOC partner companies.

After his win at 2010 Worlds, Takahashi appeared as a guest on many TV shows and as an advertising spokesperson for the "Use pesticides safely campaign" and Japan Post.

== Programs ==
=== Ice Dance with Muramoto ===
Season	Rhythm dance	Free dance	Exhibition
2022–2023	Conga Is Gonna Get You by Gloria Estefan & Miami Sound Machine Remix by pSyk; Ahora (Emotional Rap Beat Mix) by Isatorresbeats; Move by Said Mrad choreo. by Marina Zoueva, Ilia Tkachenko, Koyo Yanai, Maxim Kozhevnikov, Sarry, Randi Strong	Phantasia by Andrew Lloyd Webber arranged by Geoffrey Alexander performed by Julian Lloyd Webber & Sarah Chang; Overture; The Music of the Night (from The Phantom of the Opera) by Andrew Lloyd Webber choreo. by Marina Zoueva, Ilia Tkachenko, Kenta Kojiri	Love Goes by Sam Smith choreo. by Massimo Scali
2021–2022	Sōran Bushi by Maïa Barouh Koto by Clozee choreo. by Marina Zoueva, Ilia Tkachenko, Koyo Yanai	La Bayadère by Ludwig Minkus choreo. by Marina Zoueva, Massimo Scali	You Are the Reason by Calum Scott, Leona Lewis
2020–2021	The Mask by Randy Edelman choreo. by Marina Zoueva, Ilia Tkachenko, Maxim Kozhevnikov	La Bayadère by Ludwig Minkus choreo. by Marina Zoueva, Massimo Scali	You Are the Reason by Calum Scott, Leona Lewis

=== Men's singles ===
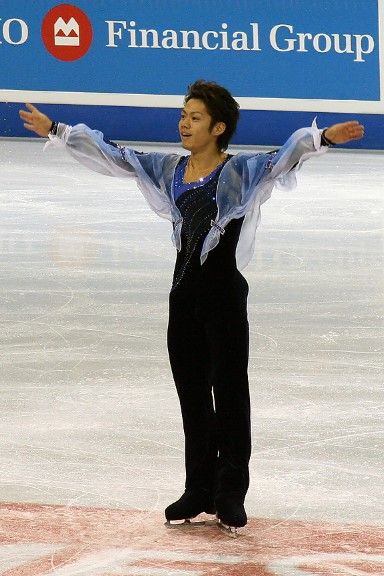
Takahashi during his short program to Violin Concerto by Pyotr Ilyich Tchaikovsky at the 2006 Skate Canada International.

Season	Short program	the free skate	Exhibition
2019–2020	The Phoenix by Fall Out Boy choreo. by Sheryl Murakami, Yuko Kai, Misha Ge	Pale Green Ghosts by John Grant arranged by Fiona Brice with the BBC Philharmonic Orchestra choreo. by Benoît Richaud	
2018–2019	The Sheltering Sky by Ryuichi Sakamoto choreo. by David Wilson	Prelude in C-sharp minor by Sergei Rachmaninoff; Pale Green Ghosts by John Grant arranged by Fiona Brice with the BBC Philharmonic Orchestra choreo. by Benoît Richaud	
2013–2014	Sonatina for Violin in C-sharp minor originally associated with Mamoru Samuragochi; credited as "Unknown" choreo. by Kenji Miyamoto	Beatles medley: Yesterday; Come Together; In My Life; The Long and Winding Road by The Beatles; Friends and Lovers by George Martin choreo. by Lori Nichol	Primavera Porteña by Quint Elle composed by Astor Piazzolla choreo. by Kenji Miyamoto; Historia de un Amor played by Pérez Prado; Qué rico el mambo by Pérez Prado choreo. by Shae-Lynn Bourne; The Crisis (from The Legend of 1900) by Ennio Morricone choreo. by Kenji Miyamoto; Kissing You by Desree choreo. by Kenji Miyamoto
2012–2013	Moonlight Sonata by Ludwig van Beethoven choreo. by Nikolai Morozov; Rock'n'Roll medley (Hard Times) by Noble "Thin Man" Watts; The Stroll by Lawson Haggart Rockin' Band; Rudy's Rock by Bill Haley & His Comets choreo. by Nanami Abe	Pagliacci by Ruggero Leoncavallo choreo. by Shae-Lynn Bourne	Primavera Porteña by Quint Elle composed by Astor Piazzolla choreo. by Kenji Miyamoto; Sweat by Snoop Dogg (David Guetta remix) choreo. by Kenji Miyamoto
2011–2012	In the Garden of Souls by Vas choreo. by David Wilson	Blues for Klook by Eddy Louiss choreo. by Pasquale Camerlengo	The Crisis (from The Legend of 1900) by Ennio Morricone choreo. by Kenji Miyamoto
2010–2011	Historia de un Amor played by Pérez Prado; Qué rico el mambo by Pérez Prado choreo. by Shae-Lynn Bourne	Invierno Porteño; Primavera Porteña by Tango Siempre composed by Astor Piazzolla choreo. by Pasquale Camerlengo	La Valse d'Amélie (piano version) (from Amélie) by Yann Tiersen choreo. by Stéphane Lambiel
2009–2010	Eye by COBA choreo. by Kenji Miyamoto	La Strada by Nino Rota choreo. by Pasquale Camerlengo	Luv Letter by DJ Okawari composed, piano performed by TSUKINOSORA choreo. by Kenji Miyamoto
2008–2009	Did not compete this season		
2007–2008	Hip Hawk, original composition by Alexander Goldstein based on Swan Lake by Pyotr Tchaikovsky choreo. by Nikolai Morozov	Romeo and Juliet by Pyotr Tchaikovsky choreo. by Nikolai Morozov	Bachelorette by Björk choreo. by Kenji Miyamoto
2006–2007	Violin Concerto in D major, Op. 35 by Pyotr Tchaikovsky choreo. by Nikolai Morozov	The Phantom of the Opera by Andrew Lloyd Webber choreo. by Nikolai Morozov	El Tango de Roxanne (from Moulin Rouge!) by Mariano Mores performed by Ewan McGregor choreo. by Nikolai Morozov
2005–2006	El Tango de Roxanne (from Moulin Rouge!) by Mariano Mores choreo. by Nikolai Morozov	Piano Concerto No. 2 by Sergei Rachmaninoff choreo. by Nikolai Morozov	Nocturne by Secret Garden choreo. by Daisuke Takahashi
2004–2005	Nyah (from Mission: Impossible 2) by Hans Zimmer choreo. by Tatiana Tarasova; Sabre Dance (from Gayane) by Aram Khachaturian	Concierto de Aranjuez by Joaquín Rodrigo choreo. by Tatiana Tarasova	Nocturne by Secret Garden choreo. by Daisuke Takahashi
2003–2004	Nyah from Mission: Impossible II by Hans Zimmer choreo. by Tatiana Tarasova	Rhapsody on a Theme of Paganini variation on a theme of Niccolò Paganini by Sergei Rachmaninoff choreo. by Tatiana Tarasova	Desert Rose by Sting choreo. by Tatiana Tarasova
2002–2003	Symphony No. 4 by Philip Glass	Star Wars Episode II: Attack of the Clones by John Williams	What a Wonderful World by Joey Ramone
2001–2002	West Side Story by Leonard Bernstein	Concerto for violin and orchestra No.1 in G minor, Op.26 by Max Bruch	Maria (from West Side Story)

== Competitive highlights ==
GP: Grand Prix; JGP: Junior Grand Prix

=== Ice dance with Muramoto ===
International
Event	20–21	21–22	22–23
Worlds		16th	11th
Four Continents		2nd	9th
GP NHK Trophy	3rd	6th	6th
GP Skate America			6th
CS Denis Ten MC			1st
CS Warsaw Cup		2nd	
National
Japan Champ.	2nd	2nd	1st
Team events
World Team Trophy			3rd T 4th P

=== Men's singles ===
International
Event	99–00	00–01	01–02	02–03	03–04	04–05	05–06	06–07	07–08	08–09	09–10	10–11	11–12	12–13	13–14	18–19	19–20
Olympics							8th				3rd				6th		
Worlds					11th	15th		2nd	4th		1st	5th	2nd	6th			
Four Continents				13th	6th	3rd			1st			1st	2nd	7th			
GP Final							3rd	2nd	2nd		5th	4th	2nd	1st	WD		
GP Bofrost				11th													
GP Cup of China														2nd			
GP France					5th	11th											
GP NHK Trophy				8th			3rd	1st	1st		4th	1st	1st	2nd	1st		
GP Skate America							1st		1st			1st			4th		
GP Skate Canada					7th			2nd			2nd		3rd				
Finlandia											1st						
Universiade						1st		1st									
Asian Games				6th													
Japan Challenge							2nd										
International: Junior
Junior Worlds			1st														
JGP Final			4th														
JGP Bulgaria			2nd														
JGP China		9th															
JGP Japan			1st														
JGP Ukraine		8th															
National
Japan			5th	4th	3rd	6th	1st	1st	1st		1st	3rd	1st	2nd	5th	2nd	12th
Japan Junior	3rd	4th	1st														
Team events
World Team; Trophy													1st T 1st P	3rd T 1st P			
Japan Open							1st T 2nd P		1st T 4th P			1st T 2nd P	3rd T 6th P	1st T 1st P	1st T 4th P		

== Detailed results ==
=== Ice dance with Muramoto ===
ISU personal best scores in the +5/-5 GOE System
Segment	Type	Score	Event
Total	TSS	195.01	2023 World Team Trophy
Short program	TSS	79.56	2022 CS Denis Ten Memorial
Short program	TES	47.71	2022 CS Denis Ten Memorial
Short program	PCS	33.25	2023 World Team Trophy
Free skating	TSS	116.63	2023 World Team Trophy
Free skating	TES	65.67	2023 World Championships
Free skating	PCS	51.50	2023 World Team Trophy

- Small medals for short program and free skating awarded only at ISU Championships.
- At team events, medals are awarded for team results only.

2022–23 season
Date	Event	RD	FD	Total
April 13–16, 2023	2023 World Team Trophy	4; 78.38	5; 116.63	3T/4P; 195.01
March 20–26, 2023	2023 World Championships	11; 72.92	10; 115.95	11; 188.87
February 7–12, 2023	2023 Four Continents Championships	7; 64.59	9; 95.65	9; 160.24
December 21–25, 2022	2022–23 Japan Championships	1; 77.70	1; 108.91	1; 186.61
November 18–20, 2022	2022 NHK Trophy	5; 75.10	7; 103.68	6; 178.78
October 26–29, 2022	2022 Denis Ten Memorial	1; 79.56	1; 108.74	1; 188.30
October 21–23, 2022	2022 Skate America	5; 69.67	6; 100.01	6; 169.68
2021–22 season
Date	Event	RD	FD	Total
March 21–27, 2022	2022 World Championships	16; 67.77	15; 96.48	16; 164.25
January 18–23, 2022	2022 Four Continents Championships	2; 72.43	2; 109.48	2; 181.91
December 22–26, 2021	2021–22 Japan Championships	2; 63.35	1; 112.96	2; 176.31
November 17–20, 2021	2021 CS Warsaw Cup	2; 75.87	2; 114.29	2; 190.16
November 12–14, 2021	2021 NHK Trophy	6; 70.74	6; 108.76	6; 179.50
2020–21 season
Date	Event	RD	FD	Total
December 24–27, 2020	2020–21 Japan Championships	2; 67.83	3; 84.03	2; 151.86
November 27–29, 2020	2020 NHK Trophy	2; 64.15	3; 93.10	3; 157.25

=== Senior men's singles ===
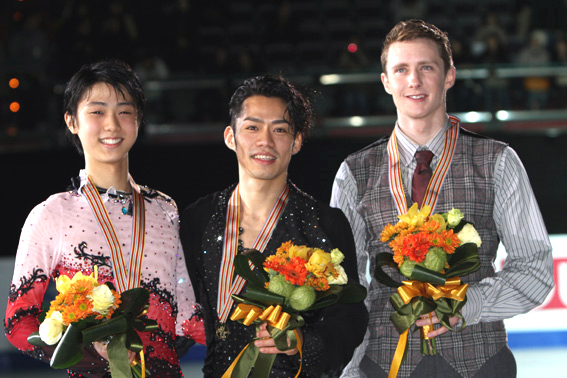
Takahashi with the other medalists at the 2011 Four Continents Championships.

ISU personal best scores in the +3/-3 GOE System
Segment	Type	Score	Event
Total	TSS	276.72	2012 World Team Trophy
Short program	TSS	95.55	2013 NHK Trophy
Short program	TES	50.41	2013 NHK Trophy
Short program	PCS	45.14	2013 NHK Trophy
Free skating	TSS	182.72	2012 World Team Trophy
Free skating	TES	93.98	2008 Four Continents
Free skating	PCS	93.58	2012 World Team Trophy

2019–20 season
Date	Event	SP	FS	Total
December 18–22, 2019	2019–20 Japan Championships	14; 65.95	10; 138.36	12; 204.31
2018–19 season
Date	Event	SP	FS	Total
December 20–24, 2018	2018–19 Japan Championships	2; 88.52	4; 151.10	2; 239.62
2013–14 season
Date	Event	SP	FS	Total
February 13–14, 2014	2014 Winter Olympic Games	4; 86.40	6; 164.27	6; 250.67
December 21–24, 2013	2013–14 Japan Championships	4; 82.57	5; 170.24	5; 252.81
November 8–10, 2013	2013 NHK Trophy	1; 95.55	1; 172.76	1; 268.31
October 18–20, 2013	2013 Skate America	5; 77.09	4; 159.12	4; 236.21
October 5, 2013	2013 Japan Open	–	4; 149.12	1T
2012–13 season
Date	Event	SP	FS	Total
April 11–14, 2013	2013 World Team Trophy	2; 80.87	1; 168.65	3T (1P); 249.52
March 10–17, 2013	2013 World Championships	4; 84.67	8; 154.36	6; 239.03
February 6–11, 2013	2013 Four Continents Championships	4; 82.62	8; 140.15	7; 222.77
December 20–24, 2012	2012–13 Japan Championships	2; 88.04	1; 192.36	2; 280.40
December 6–9, 2012	2012–13 Grand Prix Final	1; 92.29	3; 177.11	1; 269.40
November 23–25, 2012	2012 NHK Trophy	2; 87.47	2; 164.04	2; 251.51
November 2–4, 2012	2012 Cup of China	1; 84.79	2; 146.96	2; 231.75
October 6, 2012	2012 Japan Open	–	1; 172.06	1T
2011–12 season
Date	Event	SP	FS	Total
April 18–22, 2012	2012 World Team Trophy	1; 94.00	1; 182.72	1T (1P); 276.72
March 26 – April 1, 2012	2012 World Championships	3; 85.72	3; 173.94	2; 259.66
February 7–12, 2012	2012 Four Continents Championships	3; 82.59	2; 161.74	2; 244.33
December 22–26, 2011	2011–12 Japan Championships	1; 96.05	3; 158.55	1; 254.60
December 8–11, 2011	2011–12 Grand Prix Final	5; 76.49	2; 172.63	2; 249.12
November 11–13, 2011	2011 NHK Trophy	1; 90.43	1; 169.32	1; 259.75
October 27–30, 2011	2011 Skate Canada International	2; 84.66	3; 153.21	3; 237.87
October 1, 2011	2011 Japan Open	–	6; 130.79	3T
2010–11 season
Date	Event	SP	FS	Total
April 24 – May 1, 2011	2011 World Championships	3; 80.25	6; 152.72	5; 232.97
February 15–20, 2011	2011 Four Continents Championships	1; 83.49	1; 160.51	1; 244.00
December 24–27, 2010	2010–11 Japan Championships	4; 74.78	2; 162.01	3; 236.79
December 9–12, 2010	2010–11 Grand Prix Final	3; 82.57	6; 137.20	4; 219.77
November 11–14, 2010	2010 Skate America	2; 78.12	1; 148.95	1; 227.07
October 21–24, 2010	2010 NHK Trophy	1; 78.04	1; 156.75	1; 234.79
October 2, 2010	2010 Japan Open	–	2; 159.19	1T
2009–10 season
Date	Event	SP	FS	Total
March 22–28, 2010	2010 World Championships	1; 89.30	1; 168.40	1; 257.70
February 14–27, 2010	2010 Winter Olympic Games	3; 90.25	5; 156.98	3; 247.23
December 25–27, 2009	2009–10 Japan Championships	1; 92.85	1; 168.28	1; 261.13
December 3–6, 2009	2009–10 Grand Prix Final	1; 89.95	5; 134.65	5; 224.60
November 19–22, 2009	2009 Skate Canada International	2; 76.30	1; 155.01	2; 231.31
November 5–8, 2009	2009 NHK Trophy	4; 78.18	4; 136.11	4; 214.29
October 8–11, 2009	2009 Finlandia Trophy	1; 83.23	2; 141.02	1; 224.25
2007–08 season
Date	Event	SP	FS	Total
April 20, 2008	2008 Japan Open	–	4; 127.23	1T
March 17–23, 2008	2008 World Championships	3; 80.40	6; 139.71	4; 220.11
February 13–17, 2008	2008 Four Continents Championships	1; 88.57	1; 175.84	1; 264.41
December 26–28, 2007	2007–08 Japan Championships	1; 85.43	1; 169.15	1; 254.58
December 13–16, 2007	2007–08 Grand Prix Final	1; 84.20	2; 154.74	2; 238.94
November 29 – December 2, 2007	2007 NHK Trophy	2; 77.89	1; 156.33	1; 234.22
October 25–28, 2007	2007 Skate America	1; 80.04	2; 148.93	1; 228.97
2006–07 season
Date	Event	SP	FS	Total
March 19–25, 2007	2007 World Championships	3; 74.51	1; 163.44	2; 237.95
January 17–27, 2007	2007 Winter Universiade	1; 79.03	1; 161.58	1; 240.61
December 27–29, 2006	2006–07 Japan Championships	1; 85.55	1; 170.53	1; 256.08
December 14–17, 2006	2006–07 Grand Prix Final	2; 79.99	3; 144.84	2; 224.83
November 30 – December 3, 2006	2006 NHK Trophy	1; 84.44	1; 163.49	1; 247.93
November 2–5, 2006	2006 Skate Canada International	1; 78.80	2; 129.41	2; 208.21
2005–06 season
Date	Event	SP	FS	Total
May 14, 2006	2006 Japan Open	–	2; 141.10	1T
February 11–24, 2006	2006 Winter Olympic Games	5; 73.77	9; 131.12	8; 204.89
December 23–25, 2005	2005–06 Japan Championships	2; 74.52	1; 148.60	1; 223.12
December 16–18, 2005	2005–06 Grand Prix Final	3; 74.60	3; 137.92	3; 212.52
December 1–4, 2005	2005 NHK Trophy	1; 77.70	3; 127.60	3; 205.30
October 20–23, 2005	2005 Skate America	1; 69.10	1; 149.44	1; 218.54
October 1, 2005	Japan International Challenge	–	2; 133.57	–
2004–05 season
Date	Event	SP	FS	Total
March 14–20, 2005	2005 World Championships	7; 72.18	18; 108.04	15; 180.22
February 14–20, 2005	2005 Four Continents Championships	3; 68.46	2; 123.83	3; 192.29
January 12–22, 2005	2005 Winter Universiade	2	1	1
December 24–26, 2004	2004–05 Japan Championships	5; 59.83	5; 113.84	6; 173.67
November 19–21, 2004	2004 Trophée Eric Bompard	3; 64.16	11; 71.54	11; 135.70
2003–04 season
Date	Event	SP	FS	Total
March 22–28, 2004	2004 World Championships	11	11	11
January 19–25, 2004	2004 Four Continents Championships	9	4	6
December 25–26, 2003	2003–04 Japan Championships	4	3	3
November 13–16, 2003	2003 Trophée Lalique	2; 71.31	5; 123.31	5; 194.62
October 30 – November 2, 2003	2003 Skate Canada International	5; 61.81	7; 116.99	7; 178.80
2002–03 season
Date	Event	SP	FS	Total
February 10–16, 2003	2003 Four Continents Championships	10	13	13
February 2–4, 2003	2003 Asian Winter Games	6	6	6
December 19–22, 2002	2002–03 Japan Championships	2	4	4
November 28 – December 1, 2002	2002 NHK Trophy	10	7	8
November 8–10, 2002	2002 Bofrost Cup on Ice	10	11	11
