= Kana Muramoto =

Japanese retired ice dancer (born 1993)

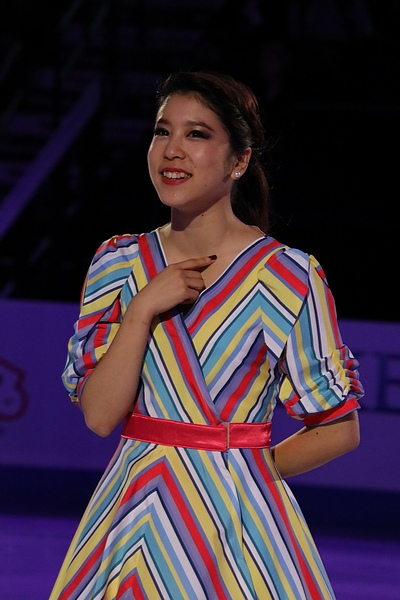
- Muramoto at the 2016 Skate America

Personal information
- Born: March 3, 1993 (age 33) Akashi, Hyōgo
- Home town: Kobe
- Height: 1.62 m (5 ft 4 in)

Figure skating career
- Country: Japan
- Discipline: Ice dance (2014–2023); Women's singles (until 2013)
- Partner: Daisuke Takahashi (2020-present); Chris Reed (2015-2018); Hiroichi Noguchi (2014-2015)
- Coach: Marina Zueva; Ilia Tkachenko; Johnny Johns
- Skating club: Kansai Univ. Kaisers FSC
- Highest WS: 13th (ice dance, 2023); 79th (singles, 2012)
Event	Gold medal – first place	Silver medal – second place	Bronze medal – third place
Four Continents Championships	0	1	1
Japan Championships	4	2	1
World Team Trophy	1	0	1
Medal list
Four Continents Championships
Silver medal – second place	2022 Tallinn	Ice dance
Bronze medal – third place	2018 Taipei	Ice dance
Japan Championships
Gold medal – first place	2015–16 Sapporo	Ice dance
Gold medal – first place	2016–17 Osaka	Ice dance
Gold medal – first place	2017–18 Tokyo	Ice dance
Gold medal – first place	2022–23 Osaka	Ice dance
Silver medal – second place	2020–21 Nagano	Ice dance
Silver medal – second place	2021–22 Saitama	Ice dance
Bronze medal – third place	2014–15 Nagano	Ice dance
World Team Trophy
Gold medal – first place	2017 Tokyo	Team
Bronze medal – third place	2023 Tokyo	Team

Kana Muramoto (村元 哉中, Muramoto Kana; born March 3, 1993) is a Japanese retired figure skater (women's singles and ice dance) and choreographer. With her skating partner, Daisuke Takahashi, she is the 2022 Four Continents silver medalist, the 2022–23 Japanese national champion and the 2022 Denis Ten Memorial Challenge champion.

With her former skating partner, Chris Reed, she is the 2018 Four Continents bronze medalist, the 2017 Asian Winter Games silver medalist, and a three-time Japanese national champion (2016–2018). They competed in the final segment at five ISU Championships and the 2018 Winter Olympics.

== Personal life ==
Kana Muramoto was born on March 3, 1993, in Akashi, Hyōgo, Japan. She is the younger sister of former figure skater Satsuki Muramoto. In 2011, she graduated from Canadian Academy, an international school in Kobe, Japan.

== Career ==
=== Early career ===
Muramoto began learning to skate in 1998. Through the 2013–2014 season, she competed in ladies' singles, coached by Mie Hamada and Yamato Tamura. She won the silver medal at the 2011 Triglav Trophy and bronze at the 2011 Crystal Skate of Romania.

In the 2014–2015 season, Muramoto began appearing in ice dancing with Hiroichi Noguchi. The two placed fourth at the 2014 Tallinn Trophy and took the bronze medal at the Japan Championships.

=== 2015–2016 season: Debut of Muramoto/Reed ===
On June 17, 2015, Muramoto and Chris Reed announced that they would compete together, coached by Marina Zueva, Oleg Epstein, and Massimo Scali in Canton, Michigan.

Making their international debut, Muramoto/Reed placed 7th at the 2015 NHK Trophy in November. The following month, they won the Japanese national title. In January 2016, the duo took silver at the Toruń Cup in Poland. They placed 7th at the 2016 Four Continents Championships in February in Taipei, Taiwan. In March, they placed 16th in the short dance, 14th in the free dance, and 15th overall at the 2016 World Championships in Boston, Massachusetts.

=== 2016–2017 season ===
Muramoto/Reed won silver at the 2016 CS U.S. Classic in September and placed 8th at the 2016 Skate America in October. They withdrew from their November Grand Prix event, the 2016 NHK Trophy. After winning their second national title, the duo took bronze at the 2017 Toruń Cup.

In February, Muramoto/Reed placed 9th at the 2017 Four Continents Championships in Gangneung, South Korea, and won silver at the 2017 Asian Winter Games in Sapporo, Japan. In March, they placed 23rd in the short dance at the 2017 World Championships in Helsinki, Finland. As a result, they did not advance to the final segment and missed qualifying for the Olympics.

=== 2017–2018 season: Pyeongchang Olympics ===
Muramoto/Reed began their season in September, taking bronze at the 2017 CS U.S. Classic. At the end of the month, they competed at the 2017 Nebelhorn Trophy, the final qualifying opportunity for the Olympics. The two won the silver medal and secured one Olympic spot in the ice dance discipline for Japan. In November, they appeared at a pair of Grand Prix events, finishing 9th at the 2017 NHK Trophy and 7th at the 2017 Skate America. They then won their third national title, outscoring the silver medalists by nearly 17 points.

In January, Muramoto/Reed won the bronze medal at the 2018 Four Continents Championships in Taipei, Taiwan. In February, they competed at the 2018 Winter Olympics in PyeongChang, South Korea. They placed 15th in the short dance, 13th in the free dance, and 15th overall. The following month, they finished 11th at the 2018 World Championships in Milan, Italy.

=== 2018–2019 season: End of Muramoto/Reed ===
Muramoto/Reed were assigned to the 2018 NHK Trophy and 2018 Rostelecom Cup. However, on August 9, 2018, Japanese news media reported that they had ended their partnership and that Muramoto planned to search for a new partner.

=== 2020–2021 season: Debut of Muramoto/Takahashi ===
In September 2019, Muramoto formed a new partnership with former Japanese singles skater Daisuke Takahashi, with plans to debut in the fall of 2020. The decision of Takahashi, a former Olympic bronze medalist and World champion in men's singles, to switch to ice dance attracted considerable media attention both in Japan and abroad. The two began training in Florida under Marina Zoueva, the coach of Olympic champions Virtue/Moir and Davis/White.

Due to the COVID-19 pandemic, the Grand Prix was assigned based primarily on geographic location. Muramoto/Takahashi nevertheless traveled from Florida to Japan to make their debut at the 2020 NHK Trophy, in a field consisting of three Japanese dance teams. They were second in the rhythm dance, six points behind the reigning national champions, Komatsubara/Koleto and narrowly ahead of reigning national silver medalists Fukase/Cho. They placed third in the free dance, winning the bronze medal overall. Muramoto said she felt they could do better at their next competition.

Making their Japan Championships debut, Muramoto/Takahashi placed second in the rhythm dance, less than four points behind Komatsubara/Koleto. They were third in the free dance, winning the silver medal overall. They were named as first alternates to the World team. In February, they were forced to withdraw as alternates due to a knee injury to Muramoto and were replaced by bronze medalists Fukase/Cho.

=== 2021–2022 season: Four Continents silver ===
Muramoto/Takahashi were again assigned to begin the season at the 2021 NHK Trophy, their lone assignment on the Grand Prix for the year. Sixth in both segments, they were sixth overall, defeating domestic rivals Komatsubara/Koleto by 7.30 points. Both expressed satisfaction with the results, but Takahashi said, "there is still a large gap we want to close to the top teams." They went on to win a silver medal at the 2021 CS Warsaw Cup.

The 2021–22 Japan Championships, the final national qualification event for the 2022 Winter Olympics, pitted Muramoto/Takahashi against Komatsubara/Koleto for the second time that season. Muramoto and Takahashi both fell in the rhythm dance, as a result placing second in that segment, five points back of their rivals. They won the free dance but took the silver medal overall for the second consecutive year and were subsequently named as alternates for the Japanese Olympic team. They were instead assigned to make their World Championship debut later in the season and were named to compete at the Four Continents Championships as well.

Muramoto/Takahashi won the silver medal at Four Continents, placing second in both segments. Muramoto, reflecting on her prior medal at the event, said, "I share precious memories with Chris regarding ice dancing, and we were also aiming for a victory. But I am also very happy that I was able to reach the podium with Dai and compete with the world."

The team concluded the season at the 2022 World Championships, held in Montpellier with Russian dance teams absent due to the International Skating Union banning all Russian athletes due to their country's invasion of Ukraine. Qualifying to the free dance, Muramoto/Takahashi finished sixteenth.

=== 2022–2023 season: First international gold ===
At the end of May, Muramoto/Takahashi confirmed that they would continue through the 2022–2023 season.

After a sixth-place finish at the 2022 Skate America, they went on to compete at the 2022 CS Denis Ten Memorial Challenge, where they earned their first gold medal as a team. They then finished sixth at the 2022 NHK Trophy, their second Grand Prix.

At the 2022–23 Japan Championships, Muramoto/Takahashi became national champions for the first time and were subsequently named to compete at the 2023 World Championships and at the 2023 Four Continents Championships.

The team encountered difficulties at the Four Continents Championships, beginning in the rhythm dance, where Muramoto fell in the midst of their midline step sequence. Takahashi fell twice in the second half of their free dance. They finished ninth at the event.

At the 2023 World Championships, which were held on home ice in Saitama, Muramoto/Takahashi notably finished eleventh, which, tied with Muramoto/Reed in 2018, meant the highest placement of a Japanese ice dance team at a World Championships. They also achieved a personal best in the free dance. Muramoto opined afterward that "this season has been really tough, but I am very happy."

Muramoto/Takahashi were Team Japan's dance entry at the 2023 World Team Trophy, coming fourth in the rhythm dance. They were fifth in the free dance, setting a new personal best in the segment and in total score. Team Japan won the bronze medal. Muramoto said that they were undecided about continuing for another year and would discuss it while touring. They announced their joint decision to retire in May 2023. Muramoto said she did not want to look for a new partner to compete with because she could not imagine a better partner than Takahashi and would therefore prefer to pursue a professional show career with him.

== Post-competitive career ==
Since retiring from competitive figure skating, Muramoto has performed solo and with Takahashi in ice shows such as the innovative cross-genre show Hyoen, Prince Ice World, Shizuka Arakawa's Friends on Ice and Daisuke Takahashi's Kassouya. She co-choreographed a program with Takahashi titled Symmetry, which they debuted during the Prince Ice World - Broadway Rocks! tour. For Friends on Ice 2024, Muramoto created her own solo show program Fortitude. Since 2023 she has choreographed group numbers for Friends on Ice. In 2025 she choreographed a group number to the song Silhouette by AQUILO for the Stars on Ice Japan tour, featuring Mao Asada, Daisuke Takahashi, Kazuki Tomono and herself. The same year she also provided choreography for the Hyoen production "Kagamon no Yasha".

In addition she choreographed competitive and show programs for several figure skaters, including the following clients:

- Shizuka Arakawa
- Mao Asada
- Marin Honda
- Sumika Kanazawa
- Yuto Kishina
- Riria Kono
- Ikura Kushida / Koshiro Shimada
- Mai Mihara
- Kao Miura
- Haruna Murakami
- Shunsuke Nakamura
- Mayuko Oka
- Mei Okada
- Kosho Oshima
- Kaori Sakamoto
- Koshiro Shimada
- Mao Shimada
- Sena Takahashi
- Kazuki Tomono
- Rena Uezono
- Rinka Watanabe
- Sōta Yamamoto
- Thai National Figure Skating Team

In October 2024, Muramotom along with her ice dance partner Daisuke Takahashi, Olympic champion Shizuka Arakawa, Takahito Mura, Kazuki Tomono, Keiji Tanaka, Yuna Aoki, Kosho Oshima, Yuto Kishina and Rena Uezono to launch the members-only official fan community F-Ske on the platform FANICON.

== Programs ==
=== With Takahashi ===
Season	Rhythm dance	Free dance	Exhibition
2022–2023	Conga Is Gonna Get You by Gloria Estefan & Miami Sound Machine Remix by pSyk; Ahora (Emotional Rap Beat Mix) by Isatorresbeats; Move by Said Mrad choreo. by Marina Zoueva, Ilia Tkachenko, Koyo Yanai, Maxim Kozhevnikov, Sarry, Randi Strong	Phantasia by Andrew Lloyd Webber arranged by Geoffrey Alexander performed by Julian Lloyd Webber & Sarah Chang; Overture; The Music of the Night (from The Phantom of the Opera) by Andrew Lloyd Webber choreo. by Marina Zoueva, Ilia Tkachenko, Kenta Kojiri	Love Goes by Sam Smith choreo. by Massimo Scali
2021–2022	Sōran Bushi by Maïa Barouh Koto by CloZee choreo. by Marina Zoueva, Ilia Tkachenko, Koyo Yanai	La Bayadère by Ludwig Minkus choreo. by Marina Zoueva, Massimo Scali	
2020–2021	The Mask by Randy Edelman choreo. by Marina Zoueva, Ilia Tkachenko, Maxim Kozhevnikov	La Bayadère by Ludwig Minkus choreo. by Marina Zoueva, Massimo Scali	You Are the Reason by Calum Scott, Leona Lewis

=== With Reed ===
Season	Short dance	Free dance	Exhibition
2017–2018	Cha Cha: I Like It Like That by Tony Pabon, Manny Rodriguez performed by Pete Rodriguez; Rhumba: Mondo Bongo by Joe Strummer; Samba: Batucada de Sambrasil by Estudios Talkback	The Last Emperor; Merry Christmas, Mr. Lawrence by Ryuichi Sakamoto	Ryuichi Sakamoto medley: The Last Emperor; Merry Christmas, Mr. Lawrence; Unsteady X Ambassadors
2016–2017	Ray Charles medley: Blues: The Sun's Gonna Shine Again; Jive: I Got a Woman; Swing: Mess Around performed by Ray Charles	Poeta medley: Poeta en el Puerto; Amor Dulce Muerte; Nada Puede Dormir; Poeta en el Viento by Vicente Amigo	All I Need is the Girl by Jule Styne
2015–2016	Robert Stolz medley: Waltz: Wiener Café; March: Olympiamarsch; March: UNO-Marsch by Robert Stolz	Pennies from Heaven by Johnny Burke, Arthur Johnston; Jubilee Stomp by Duke Ellington; The Reel Chaplin: A Symphonic Adventure by Carl Davis; Limelight by Charlie Chaplin, Thomas Beckmann	Everything Has Changed by Taylor Swift, Ed Sheeran

=== With Noguchi ===
Season	Short dance	Free dance
2014–2015	Dame Tu Fuerza by Fortuna	Burlesque; Something's Got A Hold On Me; Bound To You; Tough Lover performed by Christina Aguilera

=== Ladies' singles ===
Season	Short program	Free skating
2011–2012	Flamenco	The Last Emperor by Ryuichi Sakamoto
2010–2011	Seville (from Mission: Impossible II) by Hans Zimmer	Zigeunerweisen by Pablo de Sarasate

== Competitive highlights ==
GP: Grand Prix; CS: Challenger Series; JGP: Junior Grand Prix

=== With Takahashi ===
International
Event	20–21	21–22	22–23
Worlds		16th	11th
Four Continents		2nd	9th
GP NHK Trophy	3rd	6th	6th
GP Skate America			6th
CS Denis Ten MC			1st
CS Warsaw Cup		2nd	
National
Japan Champ.	2nd	2nd	1st
Team events
World Team Trophy			3rd T 4th P
TBD = Assigned; WD = Withdrew; T: Team result; P: Personal result. Medals are awarded for team result only.

=== With Reed ===
International
Event	15–16	16–17	17–18	18–19
Olympics			15th	
Worlds	15th	23rd	11th	
Four Continents	7th	9th	3rd	
GP NHK Trophy	7th	WD	9th	WD
GP Skate America		8th	7th	
CS Nebelhorn			2nd	
CS U.S. Classic		2nd	3rd	
Asian Games		2nd		
Toruń Cup	2nd	3rd		
National
Japan Champ.	1st	1st	1st	
Team events
Olympics			5th T 5th P	
World Team; Trophy		1st T 5th P		
WD = Withdrew; T = Team result; P = Personal result. Medals awarded for team result only.

=== With Noguchi ===
International
Event	2014–15
Tallinn Trophy	4th
National
Japan Championships	3rd

=== Ladies' singles ===
International
Event	02–03	03–04	04–05	05–06	06–07	07–08	08–09	09–10	10–11	11–12	12–13	13–14
Challenge Cup										7th		
Crystal Skate										3rd		
Cup of Nice								4th				
Merano Cup											7th	
Triglav Trophy									2nd			
International: Junior
JGP Belarus							3rd					
JGP France									17th			
National
Japan								17th	10th	10th	16th	17th
Japan Junior						8th	12th					
Japan Novice	6th B	2nd B		4th A								
Levels: A = Novice A; B = Novice B; N = Novice; J = Junior

== Detailed results ==
=== With Takahashi ===
2022–23 season
Date	Event	RD	FD	Total
April 13–16, 2023	2023 World Team Trophy	4; 78.38	5; 116.63	3T/4P; 195.01
March 20–26, 2023	2023 World Championships	11; 72.92	10; 115.95	11; 188.87
February 7–12, 2023	2023 Four Continents Championships	7; 64.59	9; 95.65	9; 160.24
December 21–25, 2022	2022–23 Japan Championships	1; 77.70	1; 108.91	1; 186.61
November 18–20, 2022	2022 NHK Trophy	5; 75.10	7; 103.68	6; 178.78
October 26–29, 2022	2022 Denis Ten Memorial	1; 79.56	1; 108.74	1; 188.30
October 21–23, 2022	2022 Skate America	5; 69.67	6; 100.01	6; 169.68
2021–22 season
Date	Event	RD	FD	Total
March 21–27, 2022	2022 World Championships	16; 67.77	15; 96.48	16; 164.25
January 18–23, 2022	2022 Four Continents Championships	2; 72.43	2; 109.48	2; 181.91
December 22–26, 2021	2021–22 Japan Championships	2; 63.35	1; 112.96	2; 176.31
November 17–20, 2021	2021 CS Warsaw Cup	2; 75.87	2; 114.29	2; 190.16
November 12–14, 2021	2021 NHK Trophy	6; 70.74	6; 108.76	6; 179.50
2020–21 season
Date	Event	RD	FD	Total
December 24–27, 2020	2020–21 Japan Championships	2; 67.83	3; 84.03	2; 151.86
November 27–29, 2020	2020 NHK Trophy	2; 64.15	3; 93.10	3; 157.25
