= Nanami Abe =

Japanese figure skating coach

- 阿部奈々美
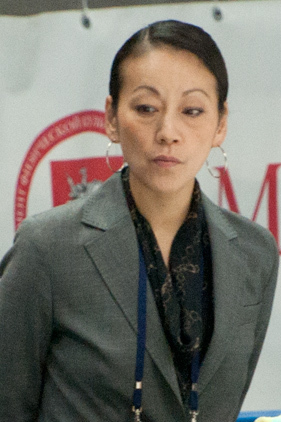
- Born: November 11, 1972 (age 53); Sendai, Miyagi, Japan
- Education: Tohoku Gakuin University
- Occupations: Figure skating coach and choreographer
- Spouse: Toshinobu Yoshida

Nanami Abe (阿部 奈々美, Abe Nanami; born November 11, 1972) is a Japanese figure skating coach and choreographer. She studied under Hiroshi Nagakubo, and coached Yuzuru Hanyu. She has choreographed routines for many skaters, including Daisuke Takahashi, Tatsuki Machida, and Akiko Suzuki.

== Early life ==
Abe was born in Sendai, Miyagi on November 11, 1972. She began skating at 3 years old. Under Hiroshi Nagakubo's coaching, she competed in the girl's single skating division. She competed in the Japan Figure Skating Championship twice; once during her senior year of high school and once in college, while attending Tohoku Gakuin University. Abe graduated from university in 1995 and began performing for Disney on Ice. She was influenced by the show's choreographer, Sarah Kawahara. When the show was not touring she coached and choreographed for figure skaters as Nagakubo's assistant.

== Career ==
In November 2001, Abe retired from Disney on Ice and began working as a figure skating coach and choreographer in Sendai. Shizuka Arakawa and Yamato Tamura were some of her first students. In 2004, when she became Arakawa's assistant coach, Abe traveled to America and studied under Tatiana Tarasova and Evgeni Platov. In 2006 she began coaching Yuzuru Hanyu, who went on to win the 2010 World Junior Figure Skating Championships and a bronze medal at the 2012 World Figure Skating Championships.

After Hanyu left Abe to train with Brian Orser, Abe returned to choreography. She choreographed for many skaters, with one of her most notable works being Daisuke Takahashi's short program in 2012. In 2014 Abe worked with the NHK on the choreography for a "making of" documentary on Yuzuru Hanyu.

Abe's husband, Toshinobu Yoshida, was not connected to the skating world until he learned to align the blades on figure skates to help his wife. He would often align blades for her students, and continues to align blades for Yuzuru Hanyu from his shop in Sendai.
