= Keiji Tanaka =

Japanese figure skater (born 1994)

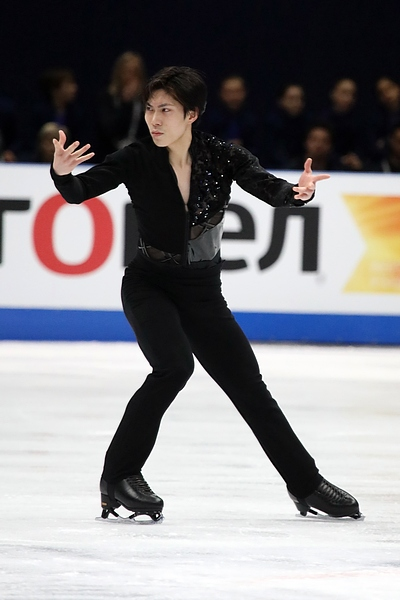
- Tanaka in 2018

Personal information
- Native name: 田中 刑事 (Tanaka Keiji)
- Born: November 22, 1994 (age 31) Kurashiki, Okayama
- Home town: Kurashiki, Okayama
- Height: 1.72 m (5 ft 8 in)

Figure skating career
- Country: Japan
- Discipline: Men's singles
- Began skating: 2002
- Competitive: 2004–2022
- Professional: 2022–present
- Highest WS: 15th (2017–18)

Medal record
Japan Championships
| Silver medal – second place | 2016–17 Osaka | Singles |
| Silver medal – second place | 2017–18 Tokyo | Singles |
| Bronze medal – third place | 2018–19 Osaka | Singles |
World Team Trophy
| Silver medal – second place | 2019 Fukuoka | Team |
World Junior Championships
| Silver medal – second place | 2011 Gangneung | Singles |

Keiji Tanaka (田中 刑事, Tanaka Keiji; born November 22, 1994) is a retired Japanese figure skater. He is the 2016 NHK Trophy bronze medalist, 2019 Skate Canada bronze medalist, three-time ISU Challenger Series medalist (including gold at the 2019 U.S. Classic), 2017 Winter Universiade silver medalist, 2011 World Junior silver medalist, six-time medalist on the ISU Junior Grand Prix, and a two-time Japanese national silver medalist (2016, 2017). He represented his country at the 2018 Winter Olympics.

== Career ==
Tanaka began skating in 2002. He trains in Osaka and Kurashiki under coaches Utako Nagamitsu and Yusuke Hayashi.

=== 2010–2011 season: Silver at Junior Worlds ===
Tanaka won the bronze medal at the Junior Grand Prix in Romania and placed sixth in his second JGP event in the U.K. He finished ninth at the Japan Junior Championships. At the World Junior Championships, he placed sixth in the short program and first in the long program to win the silver medal.

=== 2011–2012 season ===
Tanaka won two medals on the JGP series and qualified for his first JGP Final, where he finished sixth. He finished second at the Junior National Championships. He was seventh in his second trip to the World Junior Championships.

=== 2012–2013 season ===
Tanaka won silver at one JGP event and finished 4th in another, qualifying for his second JGP Final, where he placed sixth again. After receiving the junior national bronze medal, he was selected to compete at the 2013 World Junior Championships but withdrew due to injury.

=== 2013–2014 season ===
Tanaka won two gold medals during the 2013–14 JGP series and qualified for his third JGP Final. He finished fourth after placing first in the short program and fourth in the free skate. He won his first junior national title and was selected to go to the 2014 World Junior Championships, where he once again finished in seventh place.

=== 2014–2015 season ===
Tanaka received one Grand Prix assignment, the 2014 Cup of China, where he placed eighth. He finished eighth at the 2014-15 Japanese National Championships and second at the Gardena Spring Trophy later that season.

=== 2016–2017 season: National silver medal ===
During the Grand Prix series, Tanaka placed seventh at the 2016 Rostelecom Cup and won the bronze medal at the 2016 NHK Trophy. He received silver at the Japan Championships, in December 2016. In February 2017, he took silver at the Winter Universiade in Almaty, Kazakhstan.

=== 2017–2018 season: Pyeongchang Olympics ===
Tanaka finished eighth at the 2017 CS Ondrej Nepela Trophy after placing fourth in the short program and ninth in the free skate. He received two Grand Prix assignments, 2017 Rostelecom Cup and 2017 Cup of China. He withdrew from the first event due to a muscle injury in his right hip-pelvic area. In December, Tanaka won his second National silver medal, and was named to compete at the 2018 Winter Olympics, 2018 Four Continents Championships and the 2018 World Championships.

At the 2018 Four Continents Figure Skating Championships, Tanaka set new personal bests in the short program, free skate and overall, finishing fourth. He placed eighteenth at the 2018 Winter Olympics after placing twentieth in the short and fifteenth in the free. He ended the season with a thirteenth-place finish at the World Championships.

=== 2018–2019 season ===
Again beginning the season at the Ondrej Nepela Trophy, Tanaka won the bronze medal. He placed eighth at both of his two Grand Prix assignments, the 2018 Grand Prix of Helsinki and the 2018 Internationaux de France. At the Japanese National Championships, he won the bronze medal behind Shoma Uno and Daisuke Takahashi. He placed seventh at the 2019 Four Continents Championships, and fourteenth at the 2019 World Championships.

=== 2019–2020 season ===
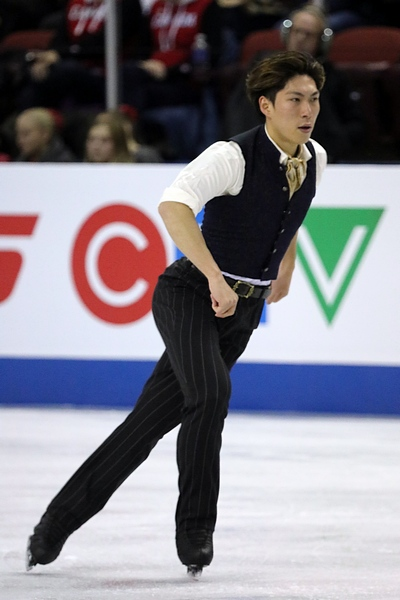
Keiji Tanaka at the 2019 Skate Canada.

Tanaka began his season at the 2019 U.S. Classic, where he won the gold medal.

Tanaka's first Grand Prix assignment was the 2019 Skate Canada International in Kelowna. Whilst traveling from a training session at the arena, Tanaka and fellow Japanese skater Marin Honda were in a car accident that led to both being briefly hospitalized. Tanaka was left with a sore knee. Tanaka was fifth in the short program after tripling a planned quad Salchow and managing only a double toe loop as part of his combination jump. He skated a new personal best in the free skate, despite two jump errors, and won the bronze medal. Tanaka was fifth at the Cup of China, his second Grand Prix.

At the 2019–20 Japan Championships, Tanaka placed fourth in both programs to place fourth overall. He was nevertheless assigned to Japan's team for the 2020 World Championships over bronze medalist Yuma Kagiyama who was assigned to the World Junior and the Four Continents championships. The World Championships were subsequently cancelled as a result of the coronavirus pandemic.

=== 2020–2021 season ===
Tanaka was assigned to compete at the 2020 NHK Trophy on the Grand Prix, as part of an all-Japanese men's field in light of the ongoing pandemic limiting international travel. He was fourth in the short program after multiple jump errors. He was fifth in the free skate, but remained in fourth place overall. He placed fourth at the 2020–21 Japan Championships.

In the spring of 2021 Tanaka was cast as Narcissus' reflection (Narcissus himself was portrayed by Olympic bronze medalist Daisuke Takahashi) in the on-ice revue LUXE, which was a spin-off of the cross-genre Hyoen series, starring Daisuke Takahashi.

=== 2021–2022 season ===
Beginning the Grand Prix at the 2021 Skate Canada International, Tanaka finished in tenth place. At his second event, the 2021 Rostelecom Cup, he was ninth.

Tanaka finished in eleventh place at the 2021–22 Japan Championships.

=== Post-competitive career ===
On April 11, 2022, Tanaka announced his retirement from competitive figure skating, intending to skate in shows and work as an assistant coach.

As a coach, his current students include Nozomu Yoshioka and Haru Kakiuchi.

Tanaka is a recurring cast member at the annual ice show Yuzuru Hanyu Notte Stellata, a commemoration event of the 2011 Tōhoku earthquake and tsunami, led by two-time Olympic champion Yuzuru Hanyu.

In the spring of 2023 it was announced that Tanaka would be portraying Roronoa Zoro in the show One Piece on Ice.

In October 2024 he joined forces with Olympic champion Shizuka Arakawa, Olympic bronze medalist Daisuke Takahashi, Kana Muramoto, Takahito Mura, Kazuki Tomono, Yuna Aoki, Kosho Oshima, Yuto Kishina and Rena Uezono to launch the members-only official fan community F-Ske on the platform FANICON.

In 2025 Tanaka was cast as Sasa Morihiko in the storytelling ice show Hyoen – Mirror-Patterend Demon , starring Daisuke Takahashi and Takahisa Masuda. It was the first time he had to speak dialogue in an ice show.

== Programs ==
Post-Competitive Career Programs

| Season | Exhibition |
|---|---|
| 2022-2023 | Run Boy Run by Woodkid, choreo. by Keiichiro Sasahara; The Prophet by Gary Moore, choreo. by Massimo Scali; Somewhere in Time by John Barry, choreo. by Nanami Abe; Forever Young by Takehara Pistol, choreo. by Kenji Miyamoto; All My Love to You performed by ISSA |
| 2021-2022 | 24 Preludes, Op.28, No.4 & No.24 by Frédéric Chopin, choreo. by Tatsuki Machida; Somewhere in Time by John Barry, performed by Roger Williams, choreo. by Nanami Abe; Progress performed by Shikao Suga; Starland performed by Daisei Miyagawa |

Competitive Career Programs

| Season | Short program | Free skating | Exhibition |
|---|---|---|---|
| 2021–2022 | Shin Evangelion by Shirō Sagisu choreo. by Kenji Miyamoto, Massimo Scali | Whiplash by Hank Levy choreo. by Kenji Miyamoto, Massimo Scali | Godzilla Main Theme by Bear McCreary; Here We Go (Godzilla vs. Kong Trailer Music) by Chris Classic ft. Eminem; Tasman Sea by Tom Holkenborg choreo. by Kohei Yoshino; Je te veux by Erik Satie choreo. by Tatsuki Machida; Primavera Porteña (Spring in Buenos Aires) by Astor Piazzolla choreo. by Massimo Scali; Whiplash by Hank Levy choreo. by Kenji Miyamoto, Massimo Scali |
| 2020–2021 | Hip Hip Chin Chin by Club des Belugas choreo. by Massimo Scali | Sherlock Holmes by Hans Zimmer choreo. by Kenji Miyamoto | JoJo's Bizarre Adventure by Yugo Kanno choreo. by Misao Sato; EVANGELION:3.0+1.0 -LE FILM AVANT 1 11170 CH edition 0706 by Shirō Sagisu |
| 2019–2020 | Hip Hip Chin Chin by Club des Belugas choreo. by Massimo Scali | Sherlock Holmes by Hans Zimmer choreo. by Kenji Miyamoto | Pump It by Black Eyed Peas |
| 2018–2019 | Memories By Gary Moore choreo. by Massimo Scali | William Tell Overture By Gioachino Rossini choreo. by Massimo Scali | JoJo's Bizarre Adventure by Yugo Kanno choreo. by Misao Sato |
| 2017–2018 | The Prophet by Gary Moore choreo. by Massimo Scali | Federico Fellini films by Nino Rota choreo. by Massimo Scali | Just Like Fire by Pink; La traviata by Giuseppe Verdi choreo. by Massimo Scali; Spirited Away by Joe Hisaishi |
| 2016–2017 | Primavera Porteña (Spring in Buenos Aires) by Astor Piazzolla choreo. by Massimo Scali | Federico Fellini films by Nino Rota choreo. by Massimo Scali | Spirited Away by Joe Hisaishi |
| 2015–2016 | Primavera Porteña by Astor Piazzolla choreo. by Massimo Scali | La traviata by Giuseppe Verdi choreo. by Massimo Scali | Afro Freak by Arts |
| 2014–2015 | Instinct Rhapsody by Ikuko Kawai choreo. by Kenji Miyamoto | La traviata by Giuseppe Verdi choreo. by Massimo Scali | |
| 2013–2014 | Instinct Rhapsody by Ikuko Kawai choreo. by Kenji Miyamoto | Doctor Zhivago by Maurice Jarre choreo. by Kenji Miyamoto | |
| 2012–2013 | Afro Freak by ARTS choreo. by Kenji Miyamoto | The Untouchables by Ennio Morricone choreo. by Kenji Miyamoto | Rise by Safri Duo |
| 2011–2012 | Violentango by Astor Piazzolla choreo. by Kenji Miyamoto | The Untouchables by Ennio Morricone choreo. by Kenji Miyamoto | |
| 2010–2011 | Violentango by Astor Piazzolla choreo. by Kenji Miyamoto | The Bolt by Dmitri Shostakovich | |

== Competitive highlights ==
GP: Grand Prix; CS: Challenger Series; JGP: Junior Grand Prix

International
| Event | 06–07 | 07–08 | 08–09 | 09–10 | 10–11 | 11–12 | 12–13 | 13–14 | 14–15 | 15–16 | 16–17 | 17–18 | 18–19 | 19–20 | 20–21 | 21–22 |
|---|---|---|---|---|---|---|---|---|---|---|---|---|---|---|---|---|
| Olympics | | | | | | | | | | | | 18th | | | | |
| Worlds | | | | | | | | | | | 19th | 13th | 14th | C | | |
| Four Continents | | | | | | | | 17th | | 6th | 13th | 4th | 7th | | | |
| GP Cup of China | | | | | | | | | 8th | | | 7th | | 5th | | |
| GP Finland | | | | | | | | | | | | | 8th | | | |
| GP France | | | | | | | | | | | | | 8th | | | |
| GP NHK Trophy | | | | | | | | | | 5th | 3rd | | | | 4th | |
| GP Rostelecom Cup | | | | | | | | | | | 7th | WD | | | | 9th |
| GP Skate Canada | | | | | | | | | | | | | | 3rd | | 10th |
| CS U.S. Classic | | | | | | | | | | 2nd | 10th | | | 1st | | |
| CS Ondrej Nepela | | | | | | | | | | | | 8th | 3rd | | | |
| Asian Open | | | | | | | | | | 2nd | 1st | 1st | | | | |
| Challenge Cup | | | | | | | | | | | | | | 2nd | | |
| Cup of Nice | | | | 7th | | | | | 3rd | | | | | | | |
| Gardena Trophy | | | | | | | | | 2nd | | | | | | | |
| Triglav Trophy | | | | | | | | 2nd | | | | | | | | |
| Universiade | | | | | | | | | | | 2nd | | | | | |
International: Junior
| Junior Worlds | | | | | 2nd | 7th | | 7th | | | | | | | | |
| JGP Final | | | | | | 6th | 6th | 4th | | | | | | | | |
| JGP Australia | | | | | | 2nd | | | | | | | | | | |
| JGP Austria | | | | | | 3rd | | | | | | | | | | |
| JGP Czech Rep. | | | | | | | | 1st | | | | | | | | |
| JGP Romania | | | | | 3rd | | | | | | | | | | | |
| JGP Slovakia | | | | | | | | 1st | | | | | | | | |
| JGP Slovenia | | | | | | | 4th | | | | | | | | | |
| JGP U.K. | | | | | 6th | | | | | | | | | | | |
| JGP USA | | | | | | | 2nd | | | | | | | | | |
| Asian Trophy | | | 1st | | | | | | | | | | | | | |
National
| Japan Champ. | | | | 8th | 11th | 7th | 7th | 8th | 8th | 4th | 2nd | 2nd | 3rd | 4th | 4th | 11th |
| Japan Junior | 16th | 8th | 6th | 6th | 9th | 2nd | 3rd | 1st | | | | | | | | |
Team events
| Olympics | | | | | | | | | | | | 5th T 5th P | | | | |
| World Team Trophy | | | | | | | | | | | | | 2nd T 5th P | | | |
| Japan Open | | | | | | | | | | | | | | | | 2nd T 3rd P |

== Detailed results ==
=== Senior level ===
Small medals for short and free programs are awarded only at ISU Championships. At team events, medals are awarded for team results only. T – team result. P – personal/individual result. Current ISU world bests highlighted in bold and italic. Personal bests are highlighted in bold.

**2021–22 season**
| Date | Event | SP | FS | Total |
| December 22–26, 2021 | 2021–22 Japan Championships | 10; 84.10 | 9; 148.32 | 11; 232.42 |
| November 26–28, 2021 | 2021 Rostelecom Cup | 10; 76.69 | 10; 153.06 | 9; 229.75 |
| October 29–31, 2021 | 2021 Skate Canada International | 6; 78.83 | 12; 143.37 | 10; 222.20 |
| October 3, 2021 | 2021 Japan Open | – | 3; 163.93 | 2T |
**2020–21 season**
| Date | Event | SP | FS | Total |
| December 24–27, 2020 | 2020–21 Japan Championships | 4; 83.61 | 4; 155.22 | 4; 238.83 |
| November 27–29, 2020 | 2020 NHK Trophy | 4; 76.57 | 5; 138.95 | 4; 215.52 |
**2019–20 season**
| Date | Event | SP | FS | Total |
| February 20–23, 2020 | 2020 Challenge Cup | 3; 75.54 | 2; 165.64 | 2; 241.18 |
| December 18–22, 2019 | 2019–20 Japan Championships | 4; 80.90 | 5; 171.54 | 4; 252.44 |
| November 8–10, 2019 | 2019 Cup of China | 7; 74.64 | 5; 158.98 | 5; 233.62 |
| October 25–27, 2019 | 2019 Skate Canada | 5; 80.11 | 3; **169.91** | 3; 250.02 |
| September 17–22, 2019 | 2019 CS U.S. International Classic | 2; **88.76** | 1; 161.20 | 1; 249.96 |
2018–19 season
| Date | Event | SP | FS | Total |
| April 11–14, 2019 | 2019 World Team Trophy | 4; **89.05** | 6; 169.79 | 2T/5P; **258.84** |
| February 7–10, 2019 | 2019 Four Continents Championships | 7; 83.93 | 6; 167.61 | 7; 251.54 |
| December 21–24, 2018 | 2018–19 Japan Championships | 4; 79.32 | 2; 157.13 | 3; 236.45 |
| November 23–25, 2018 | 2018 Internationaux de France | 8; 79.35 | 8; 136.97 | 8; 216.32 |
| November 2–4, 2018 | 2018 Grand Prix of Helsinki | 7; 80.60 | 9; 126.22 | 8; 206.82 |
| September 19–22, 2018 | 2018 CS Ondrej Nepela Trophy | 3; 77.53 | 4; 144.39 | 3; 221.92 |
2017–18 season
| Date | Event | SP | FS | Total |
| March 19–25, 2018 | 2018 World Championships | 14; 80.17 | 12; 156.49 | 13; 236.66 |
| February 14–23, 2018 | 2018 Winter Olympics (men's singles) | 20; 80.05 | 15; 164.78 | 18; 244.83 |
| February 9–11, 2018 | 2018 Winter Olympics (team event) | – | 5; 148.36 | 5T/5P |
| January 22–28, 2018 | 2018 Four Continents Championships | 3; 90.68 | 5; 169.63 | 4; 260.31 |
| December 21–24, 2017 | 2017–18 Japan Championships | 2; 91.34 | 2; 175.81 | 2; 267.15 |
| November 3–5, 2017 | 2017 Cup of China | 4; 87.19 | 8; 159.98 | 7; 247.17 |
| September 21–23, 2017 | 2017 CS Ondrej Nepela Trophy | 4; 75.81 | 9; 121.37 | 8; 197.18 |
| August 2–5, 2017 | 2017 Asian Trophy | 2; 68.75 | 1; 151.33 | 1; 220.08 |
