= Tao (musical troupe) =

Japanese musical troupe

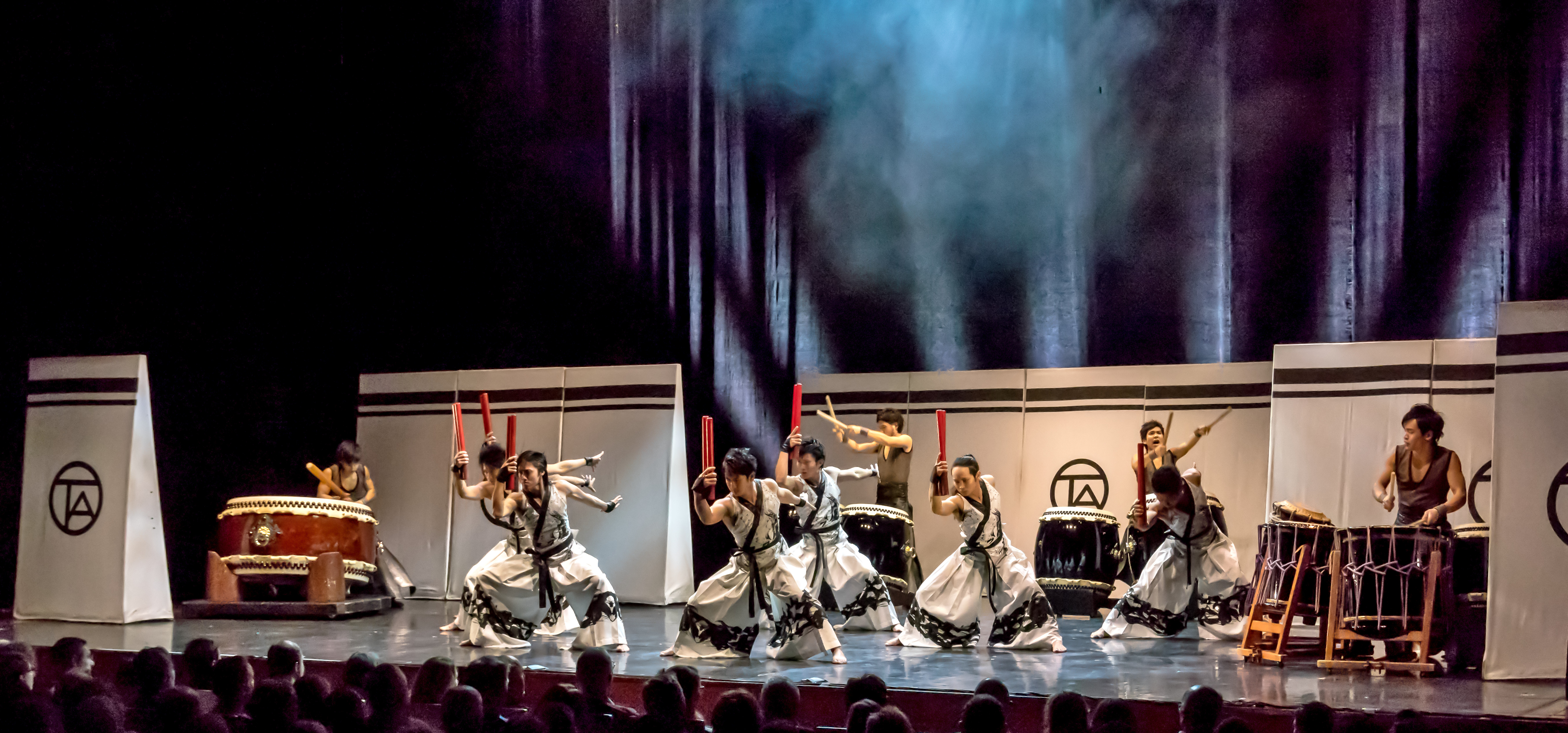
Tao performing a concert on January 25, 2015 in Freiburg im Breisgau, Germany

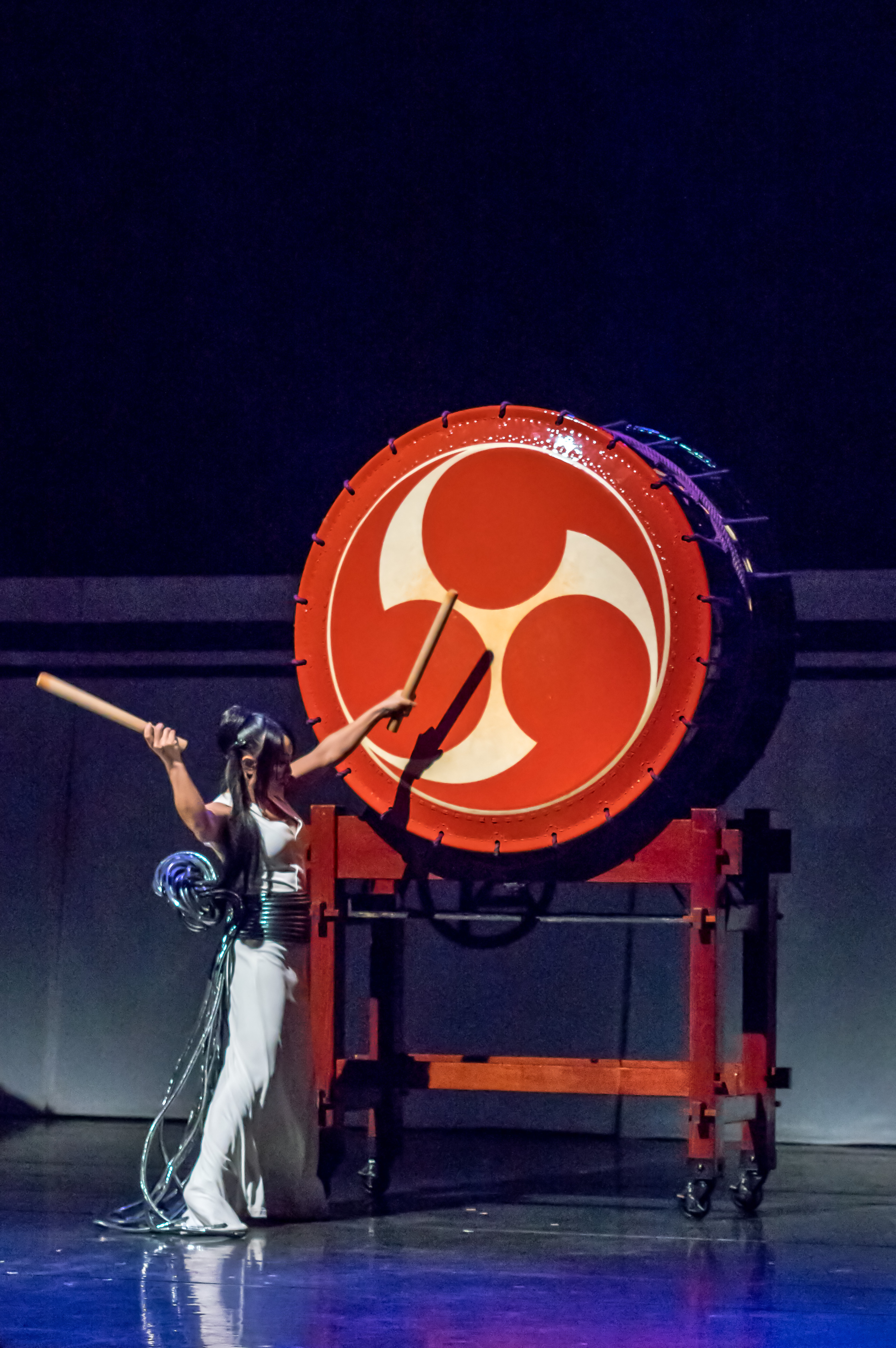
Tao performing with a taiko drum

TAO: The Martial Art of Drumming is a Japanese drum and dance ensemble formed in 1993. This performing group combines music and dance to reflect Japanese tradition, but also incorporates Korean, Maori, and Indonesian influences. While some songs are traditional, most are modern compositions created by members of the troupe.

== Training center ==
Tao’s performers train in their own center in the Kujū Highlands on Kyushu called Grandioso. The strenuous physical demands of their performance style demands that all performers also train as athletes. Their daily workouts, which start at 5 a.m. and end at 10 p.m., including a 20 kilometer run, calisthenics, martial arts training, and hours of dance, drum, and music practice. During the first ten years, 400 trainees ran away, after which the founder and "boss", Ikuo Fujitaka, adjusted the training regimen. Only 40 people dropped out between 2003 and 2008.

== Musical style ==
Many of their performance pieces include only percussion instruments, and in some cases only taiko drums, but other pieces include the shinobue, the shakuhachi, a bamboo marimba, gongs, the shamisen, and the koto.

== International tours ==
After more than a decade touring Japan, the group performed at the Edinburgh Festival Fringe, where they sold out of tickets for 25 straight days and outsold every other performance group. They have been touring internationally ever since.
