= Sōran Bushi =

Traditional Japanese sea shanty

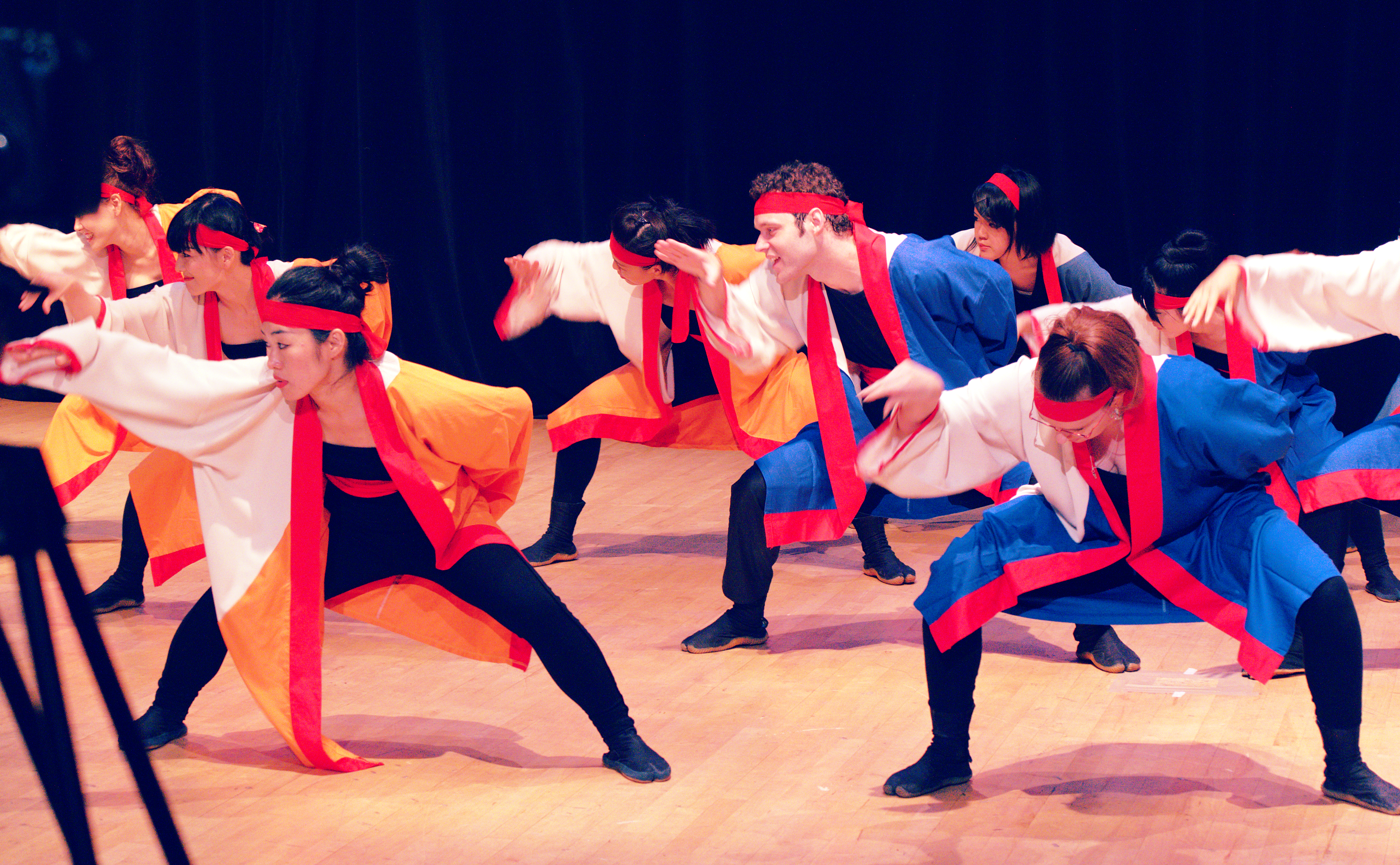
Sōran Bushi

Sōran Bushi (ソーラン節) is one of the most famous traditional songs and dance (min'yō) in Japan. It is a sea shanty that is said to have been first sung by the fishermen of Hokkaido.

The commonly known version of the song and dance is called Nanchū Sōran (南中ソーラン) and was created in 1991 at the Wakkanai Minami Junior High School. It uses the song and text of Takio Ito's Takio no Sōran Bushi from 1988, which is a modernized version of the original song with a faster rhythm and a more modern music and text. The choreography was developed by the Butoh dancer Jushō Kasuga, which includes acting ocean waves, fishermen dragging nets, pulling ropes and lifting luggage over their shoulders. The school received an honorable mention at the Folk Song and Dance Awards National Convention in 1992, and one year later the Grand Prix of the Prime Minister of Japan. This made the song and dance nationally known, so that this dance is taught in many schools across Japan as part of the curriculum.

During regular intervals of the dance, the words "Dokkoisho! Dokkoisho!" and "Soran! Soran!" are called. Those words were used in the past to encourage the fisherman during their work.

== Lyrics and translation ==
An excerpt from one of the many text versions of "Sōran Bushi"

Japanese (Rōmaji):

Yāren sōran sōran
Sōran sōran sōran (hai hai!)
Nishin kita ka to kamome ni toeba,
Watasha tatsu tori nami ni kike choi.

CHORUS (kakegoe)
Yasa e en ya sa dokkoisho
(a dokkoisho, dokkoisho!)

Yāren sōran...
Oyaji tairyō da mukashi to chigau
toreta nishin wa ore no mono choi

Yāren sōran...
Ichi-jō-go-shaku no ro o kogu fune mo
horeta ano go nya te mo choi

Yāren sōran...
Tama no suhada ga shibuki ni nurerya
uwaki kamome ga mite sawagu choi

Rough English Translation:

Oh!!! Soran, soran, soran
soran, soran, soran. (yes, yes!)
When we hear the jabbering of seagulls on the high seas,
we know we can’t give up our fishing lives on the ocean.

CHORUS
Put your backs into it! Heave, ho! Heave, ho!
(Heave, ho! Heave, ho!)

Oh!!! Soran...
Boss, I tell you, the size of this catch of herring
is different from all the others. And it's all MINE.

Oh!!! Soran...
Even if I row four and a half metres,
I couldn't get that girl's attention.

Oh!!! Soran...
A flighty seagull twitters in excitement
As it sees my bare skin, glistening with ocean surf.
