= Shizuka Arakawa =

Japanese retired figure skater (born 1982)

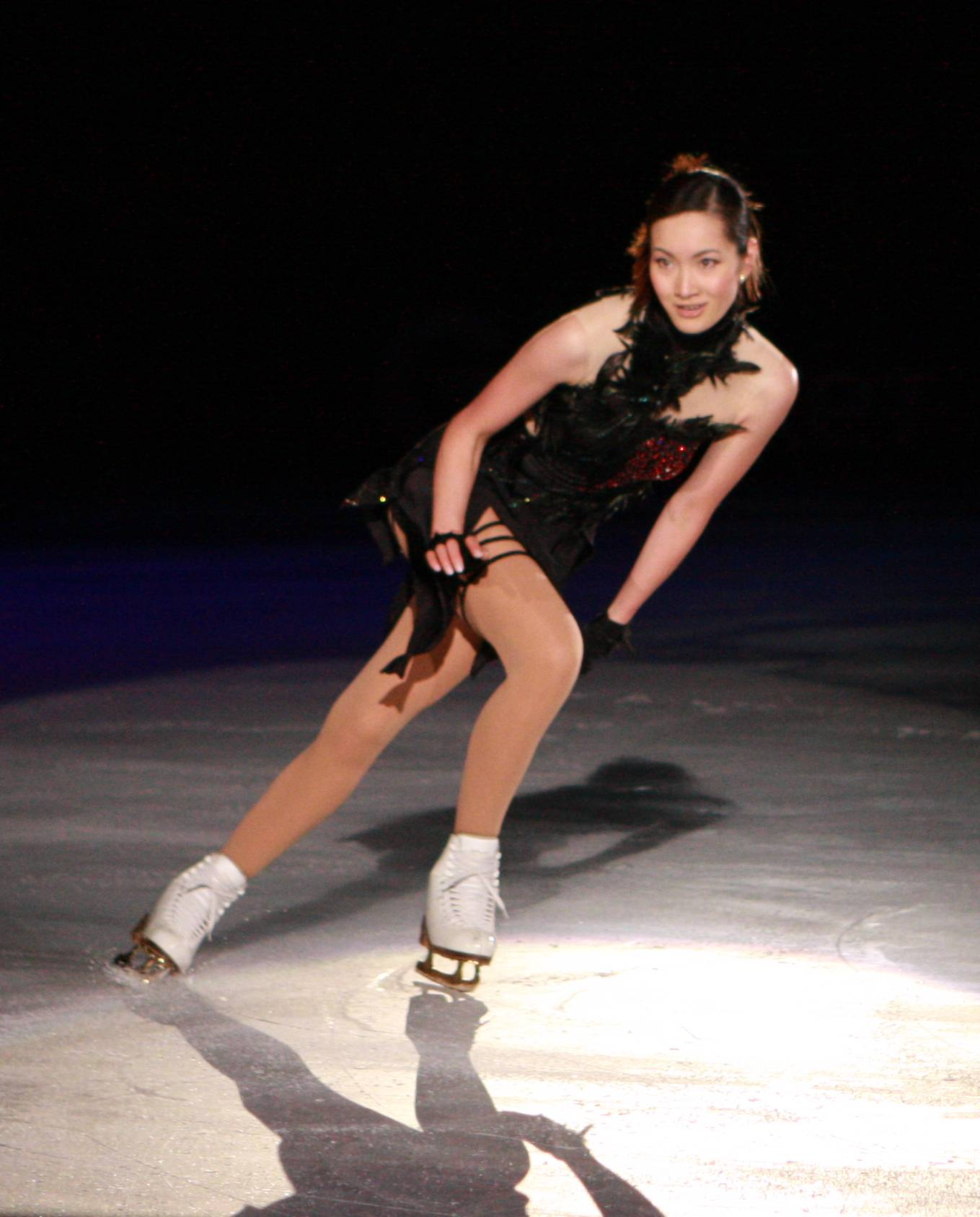
- Arakawa at the 2009 Festa On Ice.

Personal information
- Born: December 29, 1981 (age 44) Shinagawa, Tokyo, Japan
- Height: 1.66 m (5 ft 5 in)

Figure skating career
- Country: Japan
- Skating club: Prince Hotel
- Retired: May 7, 2006

Medal record
Event	Gold medal – first place	Silver medal – second place	Bronze medal – third place
Olympic Games	1	0	0
World Championships	1	0	0
Four Continents Championships	0	2	0
Grand Prix Final	0	1	1
Japanese Championships	2	3	3
Medal list
Olympic Games
Gold medal – first place	2006 Turin	Singles
World Championships
Gold medal – first place	2004 Dortmund	Singles
Four Continents Championships
Silver medal – second place	2002 Jeonju	Singles
Silver medal – second place	2003 Beijing	Singles
Grand Prix Final
Silver medal – second place	2004–05 Beijing	Singles
Bronze medal – third place	2003–04 Colorado Springs	Singles
Japanese Championships
Gold medal – first place	1997–98 Kobe	Singles
Gold medal – first place	1998–99 Yokohama	Singles
Silver medal – second place	1996–97 Nagano	Singles
Silver medal – second place	2000–01 Nagano	Singles
Silver medal – second place	2001–02 Osaka	Singles
Bronze medal – third place	2002–03 Kyoto	Singles
Bronze medal – third place	2003–04 Nagano	Singles
Bronze medal – third place	2005–06 Tokyo	Singles

Shizuka Arakawa (荒川 静香, Arakawa Shizuka; born December 29, 1981) is a retired Japanese figure skater. She is the 2006 Olympic champion and the 2004 World champion. Arakawa is the first Japanese skater to win an Olympic gold medal in figure skating and the second Japanese skater to win any Olympic medal in figure skating, after Midori Ito, who won silver in 1992. She is also the second Japanese woman to win a gold medal at the Winter Olympics, following skier Tae Satoya. She was the only Japanese medalist at the 2006 Winter Olympics.

Arakawa retired from competitive skating following her Olympic win and began skating professionally in ice shows and exhibitions. She also works as a skating sportscaster for Japanese television.

== Personal life ==
Arakawa was born in Shinagawa, Tokyo, Japan, and grew up in Sendai and its suburbs. She is the only child of Koichi and Sachi Arakawa and was named Shizuka after Shizuka Gozen.

In March 2000, Arakawa enrolled at Waseda University and graduated with a bachelor's degree in social sciences in 2004, while still competing as a skater. She won the 2004 World Figure Skating Championships days after completing her graduation examinations at Waseda University.

She lived and trained for a time at the International Skating Center of Connecticut in Simsbury, Connecticut after the closure of the Konami Sports Ice Rink in Sendai, where she began her career.

Her figure skating idols are Kristi Yamaguchi and Yuka Sato. She listens to music by Christina Aguilera, Beyoncé, Mai Kuraki (who is also a close friend of hers) and EXILE, and likes shopping, driving, swimming, golf and practicing marine sports. Arakawa cites gourmet cooking as one of her hobbies. She collects beanie babies, has a pet Shih Tzu (named Charo) and hamster (named Juntoki). She also has four dogs, named Choco, Tiramisu, Aroma and Rosa.

Arakawa was married on December 29, 2013, her 32nd birthday. Further details were not made public.

On April 16, 2014, Arakawa announced that she was pregnant and expecting her first child. On November 6, 2014, she gave birth to her daughter. On May 23, 2018, it was announced that she had given birth again to her son.

== Career ==
=== Early career ===
When Arakawa was 5 years old, she became interested in skating and entered the Chibikko Skate School. She started ballet lessons at 7. While still 7, Arakawa began training with former Olympian Hiroshi Nagakubo, a pair skater who competed in the 1972 Winter Olympics in Sapporo, Japan. She was landing triple Salchows at age 8.

In 1994, she began participating in Japanese national skating competitions. She was named the 1994, 1995, 1996 All Japan Junior Figure athlete. Arakawa progressed through the Japanese ranks quickly and was the first skater in Japan to win three consecutive junior national titles.

=== Senior career ===
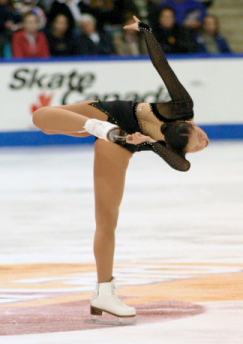
Arakawa performs a donut spin at the 2003 Skate Canada International in her free skate to Violin Fantasy on the opera Turandot.

Arakawa was the senior national Japanese champion in both 1998 and 1999. She made her Olympic debut when she represented Japan in the 1998 Winter Olympics in Nagano at age 16. The Emperor and Empress of Japan attended the ladies' free skate event. She placed 13th at the Nagano Olympics. At that time, she was ranked number 2 in Japan. In 2002, Arakawa finished second at Japan's national championships and, as a result, was not named to the Japanese 2002 Winter Olympics team.

During the 2002–2003 skating season, Arakawa won the Asian Winter Games and the Winter Universiade. She earned her second consecutive silver medal at the Four Continents Championships. She took the bronze at the NHK Trophy, and placed fifth at the Cup of Russia. She qualified for the ISU Grand Prix Final, where she finished fourth. She later placed third at the Japanese Nationals, marking her fifth medal from this meet, with two golds and two silvers from previous seasons.

In 2004, she won the World Championships in Dortmund, Germany, defeating Americans Sasha Cohen and Michelle Kwan, after landing seven clean triple jumps. She was the third Japanese woman to win this title after Midori Ito who won in 1989 and Yuka Sato in 1994. Arakawa had planned to retire after the 2004 World Championships, but her victory there convinced her to change her plans.

In 2005, Arakawa won the NHK Trophy and came in second place at the Grand Prix Finals. At the 2005 World Championships, Arakawa finished 9th, a disappointment which she later credited as a motivation to stay in the sport and regain top form. She felt she could not quit on such a down note. In November 2005, Arakawa changed coaches to Nikolai Morozov.

=== 2006 Winter Olympics ===
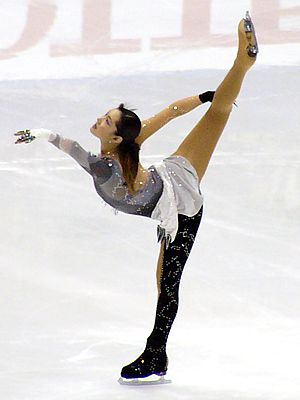
Arakawa performs a Kerrigan spiral in her exhibition to "Memory" from Cats at the 2004 NHK Trophy.

At the 2006 Winter Olympics in Turin, Italy, Arakawa skated in the short program to Fantaisie-Impromptu by Chopin. She went into the long program in third place, behind pre-event favorites Sasha Cohen and Irina Slutskaya. Less than a point separated the top three skaters. In the long program, Cohen was the first of the three leaders to skate, followed by Arakawa and Slutskaya. Cohen made two major mistakes during her long program, leaving the door open to the other leaders.

Arakawa won the free program, skating to Vanessa Mae's Violin Fantasy on Puccini's Turandot by Giacomo Puccini. She performed an Ina Bauer and then did a three jump combination. "Ina Bauer" became a household word in Japan as a result. Although she had planned two triple-triple combinations for the free skate, she did not perform them, doing instead a triple Lutz-double loop and a triple Salchow-double toe loop combinations. Arakawa earned a total combined score of 191.34 points, almost eight points ahead of the second-place Cohen (183.36). Like Cohen, Slutskaya made mistakes in her long program, and ended up taking bronze, leaving Arakawa as the gold medal winner, which was also Japan's only medal of the 2006 games. Slutskaya was third at 181.44. At age 24, Arakawa became the oldest women's Olympic skating champion in more than 80 years. Florence "Madge" Cave Syers from the United Kingdom was the oldest when she won the Olympic title at age 27 at the 1908 Summer Olympics, which featured the first Olympic figure skating events.

After winning her Olympic title, Japanese Prime Minister Junichiro Koizumi called Arakawa in Turin, Italy to congratulate her. Koizumi said, "I cheered for you with excitement while I watched television. All the Japanese people are rejoicing. I give a perfect score to every bit of your performance."

=== Post-competitive career ===
Professional skating
Arakawa retired after her Olympic victory. She continued to skate in ice shows. She competed at the 2006 Ice Wars on the World team. She also produces her own show, Friends on Ice, and is a recurring cast member at Fantasy on Ice, where she performed with Mai Kuraki to the charity song "Anata ga Irukara" in 2011 amongst others. Arakawa also does choreography.

She competed in an ABC skating series "Thin Ice," aired on March 19, 2010, paired with 2006 Olympic men's silver medallist Stéphane Lambiel. They came first in the viewer's votes, and ended the series in third place, winning a total of $45,000. They skated to the songs "Get Me Bodied" by Beyoncé and "Magic" by Robin Thicke.

As a professional figure skater, she has appeared in all three previous editions of the cross-genre ice show Hyoen (2017, 2019, 2024) starring Olympic bronze medalist Daisuke Takahashi, as well as in Hyoen's spin-off Luxe (2021).

On April 18, 2018, Arakawa was elected to the World Figure Skating Hall of Fame.

Acting
In 2006, Arakawa appeared in a Japanese TV drama, Shichinin no onna bengoshi (7 female lawyers), presented by Asahi TV. She played the role of a cool public prosecutor, Yayoi Shimasaki, in the 8th episode.

Skating event commentator and main anchor
Arashi's Sho Sakurai was the special newscaster for the 2010 Winter Olympics news coverage on NTV, with Arakawa as the main newscaster. They repeated for the 2026 Winter Olympics.

Other
In October 2024 she joined forces with Daisuke Takahashi, Kana Muramoto, Takahito Mura, Kazuki Tomono, Keiji Tanaka, Yuna Aoki, Kosho Oshima, Yuto Kishina and Rena Uezono to launch the members-only official fan community F-Ske on the platform FANICON.

== Signature moves ==
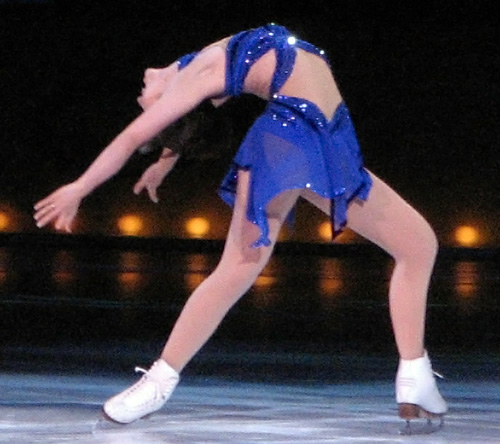
Arakawa performs her signature layback Ina Bauer in her exhibition to You Raise Me Up by Celtic Woman at the 2006 Olympics.

Arakawa is known for her jumping ability, particularly her difficult triple-triple combinations, like the triple Salchow-triple toe and the triple Lutz-triple toe, sometimes combined with a double loop. She has executed triple-triple-triple combination jumps in practice, the most of which have been the triple Salchow-triple toe-triple loop combination. She has also executed the triple Lutz-triple loop combination in practice. According to figure skating historian James R. Hines, Arakawa was "remembered for her artistry".

Arakawa is known for the quietness of her blades. She is also a strong spinner. She has an excellent donut spin, a difficult variation of the Camel spin, that requires great flexibility. In 2004, she added a Biellmann spin to her repertoire. Arakawa's signature spiral is a Y-spiral where she releases her free leg and completes the spiral with her leg still close to her head, without the hand assist.

Her trademark move is the Ina Bauer with a full backbend. Due to Arakawa's use of this move during her free skate at the 2006 Olympics, the term "Ina Bauer" became very popular in Japan, and Arakawa's performance of it became iconic. The Ina Bauer move is often referred to in Japan by Arakawa's name.

== Awards and honors ==
Japan Medals of Honor

- Purple Ribbon

Japanese Olympic Committee

- JOC Sports Award- Special Achievement Award (2002), Best Award (2005)

Municipality

- Miyagi "Citizens Award of Honor" (2006)

World Figure Skating Hall of Fame

- Class of 2018 inductee

== Programs ==
Season	Short program	Free skating	Exhibition
2005–2006	Fantaisie-Impromptu by Frédéric Chopin; Rhapsody on a Theme of Paganini by Sergei Rachmaninoff	Violin Fantasy on Puccini's Turandot by Vanessa-Mae; Fantaisie-Impromptu by Frédéric Chopin	You Raise Me Up by Celtic Woman
2004–2005	Madama Butterfly by Giacomo Puccini	Romeo and Juliet Overture by Pyotr Ilyich Tchaikovsky	"Memory" (from Cats musical) by Andrew Lloyd Webber Vocals by Grizabella
2003–2004	Swan Lake (modern version) by Pyotr Ilyich Tchaikovsky; The Umbrellas of Cherbourg by Michel Legrand	Violin Fantasy on Puccini's Turandot by Vanessa-Mae	If I Had My Way (from Camille Claudel) by Linda Eder
2002–2003	Swan Lake (modern version) by Pyotr Ilyich Tchaikovsky	Titanic by James Horner	Sing, Sing, Sing by Louis Prima; Wind Song by Tim Janis
2001–2002	Flamenco; Libertango by Astor Piazzolla	Nessun Dorma (from Turandot) by Giacomo Puccini	
2000–2001	Tempest by Fritz Kreisler	Red Violin (Aranjuez) by Joaquín Rodrigo and Ikuko Kawai	
1999–2000		Giselle	

== Competitive highlights ==
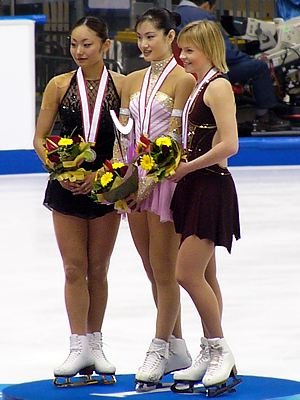
Arakawa on the podium at the 2004 NHK Trophy.

GP: Grand Prix / Champions Series

International
Event	93–94	94–95	95–96	96–97	97–98	98–99	99–00	00–01	01–02	02–03	03–04	04–05	05–06
Olympics					13th								1st
Worlds					22nd					8th	1st	9th	
Four Continents						6th		6th	2nd	2nd			
GP Final										4th	3rd	2nd	
GP Cup of China													3rd
GP Cup of Russia								7th		5th		2nd	
GP Lalique/Bompard								9th	6th		2nd		3rd
GP Nations/Spark.					7th		5th						
GP NHK Trophy				7th	6th	8th	5th			3rd		1st	
GP Skate America						9th			4th		3rd		
GP Skate Canada											2nd		
Nebelhorn Trophy		2nd	1st										
St. Gervais		2nd											
Asian Games						2nd				1st			
Universiade										1st			
International: Junior
Junior Worlds		8th	7th	8th									
National
Japan Champ.				2nd	1st	1st	5th	2nd	2nd	3rd	3rd	WD	3rd
Japan Jr. Champ.	7th	1st	1st	1st									

== Media appearances ==
=== DVD ===
- 荒川静香 Moment Beautiful skating (2006) – ASIN B000BRBPFG
- TORINO2006 日本女子 (2006) – ASIN B000EXDYHO

=== Book ===
- Tira mi su—だから私はがんばれる! (2006)- ISBN 978-4-04-883963-1
- 金メダルへの道（2006）- ISBN 978-4-14-081126-9
- LEGEND OF THE ATHLETE荒川静香物語 (2007) – ISBN 978-4-08-874369-1
