= Stéphane Lambiel =

Swiss figure skater (born 1985)

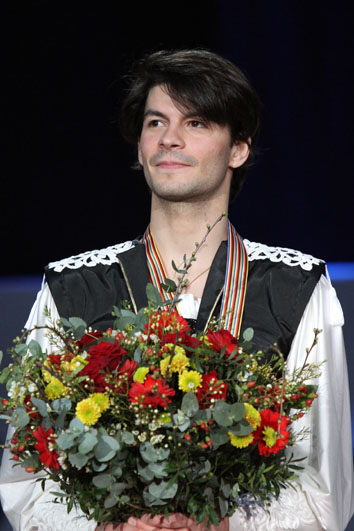
- Lambiel at the 2010 European Championships

Personal information
- Born: 2 April 1985 (age 41) Martigny, Valais, Switzerland
- Home town: Saxon
- Height: 1.75 m (5 ft 9 in)

Figure skating career
- Country: Switzerland
- Coach: Peter Grütter, Viktor Petrenko, Galina Zmievskaya, Cédric Monod
- Skating club: Patineurs de Genève
- Began skating: 1992
- Retired: 9 March 2010
Event	Gold medal – first place	Silver medal – second place	Bronze medal – third place
Olympic Games	0	1	0
World Championships	2	0	1
European Championships	0	3	0
Grand Prix Final	2	0	0
Swiss Championships	9	0	0
Medal list
Olympic Games
Silver medal – second place	2006 Turin	Singles
World Championships
Gold medal – first place	2005 Moscow	Singles
Gold medal – first place	2006 Calgary	Singles
Bronze medal – third place	2007 Tokyo	Singles
European Championships
Silver medal – second place	2006 Lyon	Singles
Silver medal – second place	2008 Zagreb	Singles
Silver medal – second place	2010 Tallinn	Singles
Grand Prix Final
Gold medal – first place	2005–06 Tokyo	Singles
Gold medal – first place	2007–08 Turin	Singles
Swiss Championships
Gold medal – first place	2001 Geneva	Singles
Gold medal – first place	2002 Zurich	Singles
Gold medal – first place	2003 Zug	Singles
Gold medal – first place	2004 Neuchâtel	Singles
Gold medal – first place	2005 Lausanne	Singles
Gold medal – first place	2006 Biasca	Singles
Gold medal – first place	2007 Geneva	Singles
Gold medal – first place	2008 Winterthur	Singles
Gold medal – first place	2010 Lugano	Singles

Stéphane Lambiel (born 2 April 1985) is a Swiss former competitive figure skater who now works as a coach and choreographer. He is a two-time (2005–2006) World champion, the 2006 Olympic silver medalist, a two-time (2005, 2007) Grand Prix Final champion, and a nine-time (2001–08, 2010) Swiss national champion. Lambiel is known for his spins and is credited with popularizing some spin positions.

== Personal life ==
Lambiel was born in Martigny, Valais, Switzerland, and grew up in Saxon. His mother is originally from Lisbon, Portugal, and his father is from Isérables, Switzerland. He has a sister, Silvia (born in 1982), and a brother, Christophe (born in 1989). His parents divorced in 1999. Lambiel lives in Lausanne and received his "maturité" (matura) in biology and chemistry in June 2004.

A native speaker of French, Lambiel also speaks Portuguese, High German (not Swiss German), and English and is learning Italian.

== Competitive career ==
Unlike most figure skaters, Lambiel can spin and jump in both counter-clockwise and clock-wise directions. He is able to do successive double Axels, changing his rotation direction between each one, but stopped training it. Lambiel had recurring injuries in both his knees, requiring him to miss exhibitions and training time, but his problems were resolved in 2009. He assisted in designing his own costumes.

=== Early career ===
Lambiel began skating when he was seven in Saxon, Switzerland, following in his sister's footsteps. His mother wanted him to play hockey but he was more interested in jumping. Around 1995, Lambiel began training in Geneva, coached by Peter Grütter. When ice was unavailable in Geneva, generally from April to June, he trained in Germany, sometimes in Oberstdorf. Salomé Brunner became his main choreographer in 1996.

Lambiel landed his first triple toe loop at age ten. As the novice national champion of Switzerland, he performed in the gala at the 1997 World Championships, held in Lausanne. He won the junior national champion for the next two years and spent three years on the junior Grand Prix circuit, winning two medals during this time. Due to the high cost of a season (100,000 Swiss francs), his village created a fan club to help raise funds after his parents' divorce in 1999. Lambiel won his first senior national title in the 2001 season, aged 15. He made his senior debut at the 2001 Europeans, finishing ninth, and was fifth at the 2001 World Junior Championships.

The next season, Lambiel turned senior and finished 6th in his first senior Grand Prix, the 2001 Trophée Lalique. The Swiss skating federation told him that they would send him to the 2002 Winter Olympics in Salt Lake City if he placed in the top twelve at the 2002 European Championships. Lambiel placed fourth and was sent to the Olympics, where he finished 15th. He was 18th at the 2002 Worlds.

Lambiel underwent knee surgery in November 2002. He placed fifth at the 2003 European Championships and moved up to tenth at Worlds. In the 2003–2004 season, he was sixth at the 2004 European Championships and fourth at the 2004 World Championships.

=== 2004–2005 season ===
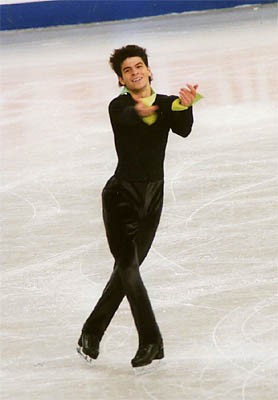
Lambiel at the 2005 World Championships

In autumn 2004, Lambiel underwent an operation on the meniscus in his left knee. Around October, he began training in Lausanne, coached by Cédric Monod. Majda and Jean-Sébastien Scharl became his physical trainers in November 2004.

Lambiel missed the 2004–05 ISU Grand Prix season but returned in time for the 2005 European Championships where he placed fourth. At the 2005 World Championships, held in Moscow, Russia, Lambiel was ahead of Evgeni Plushenko after the qualifying round and short program. Plushenko then withdrew from the competition with an injury. Skating to the King Arthur soundtrack in the long program, Lambiel landed two quadruple toe loops and gave an overall strong performance to win his first World championship; it was also his first medal at an ISU championship. He became the first Swiss man to win the event since Hans Gerschwiler did so in 1947.

=== 2005–2006 season ===
With Lambiel training mostly in Geneva with Peter Grütter, Lambiel and Monod decided to end their collaboration in late September 2005.

Lambiel won silver medals at both his Grand Prix events and won the Grand Prix Final. He came in second at the 2006 European Championships in Lyon, France, behind Plushenko. Lambiel went into the 2006 Olympic Games, in Turin, Italy, with a strong chance to medal. He was third after the short program and only placed fourth in the long program, but was able to win the silver medal when other contenders faltered. Lambiel did not complete a triple Axel at the Olympics, but he did land a clean quadruple toe loop-triple toe loop-double loop combination. Lambiel became the first Swiss figure skater since 1948 to win an Olympic medal.

Plushenko chose not to go to the 2006 World Championships, and Lambiel was considered a favorite to defend his title. He was first after the qualifying round, fourth in the short program and first in the long program, and became the first Swiss skater ever to be a two-time World Champion.

After the 2005–06 season, Lambiel participated in the Champions on Ice tour.

=== 2006–2007 season ===
Lambiel began the 2006–2007 season with a win at Skate Canada, where he finished seventh in the short program but first in the free skate. He was also assigned to the 2006 NHK Trophy, but withdrew prior to the event, citing health reasons. He recovered in time to skate at the Swiss Championships, where he won his seventh national title.

On 16 January, Lambiel withdrew from the 2007 European Championships, citing burnout. He returned to compete at the 2007 World Championships in Tokyo, Japan. In the short program, Lambiel fell on his triple Axel and only tripled the first jump in his intended quadruple toe loop-double toe loop combination, finishing sixth. He did better in the long program, landing two quadruple toe loops and a triple Axel, and earning high program component scores and a level four for three of his spins. Lambiel finished in 2nd on the night and third overall behind Brian Joubert and Daisuke Takahashi.

=== 2007–2008 season ===
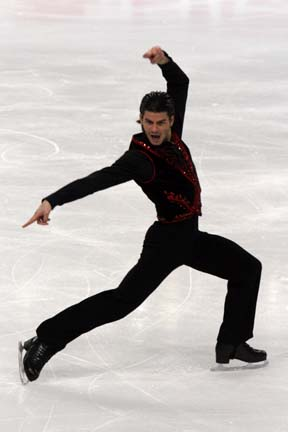
Lambiel at the 2007-2008 Grand Prix Final

In 2007, Lambiel finished 3rd at the Cup of China and 2nd at the Cup of Russia, qualifying him for the Grand Prix Final. He won the event for a second time in his career with 239.10 points, only 0.16 points ahead of Daisuke Takahashi.

At the 2008 European Championships in Zagreb, Lambiel had a disappointing short program, falling on his triple Axel and managing only a triple toe loop-double loop combination; he placed 4th. He finished 2nd in the long program after landing a quadruple toe loop-double toe loop-double loop combination and earning 80 points in program components score for his Flamenco program, a very high score at that time. He won his second European silver medal, behind Czech Tomáš Verner.

At the 2008 World Championships in Gothenburg, Lambiel fell on his triple Axel and put his hand down on a quadruple toe loop in the short program, leaving him in fifth place going into the free skate. In the free skate, he stepped out of his triple Axel attempt, put his hand down again on the quadruple toe loop in his combination, and then stepped out of his solo quadruple toe loop. He finished in fifth place overall.

Lambiel changed coaches in early June 2008, moving to the United States to work with Viktor Petrenko and Galina Zmievskaya in Wayne, New Jersey.

=== 2008–2009 season ===
Lambiel was scheduled to compete at Grand Prix events in Canada and France but withdrew from both events. He announced his retirement from competitive skating on 16 October 2008, citing an injury to the adductor muscle in one of his thighs. He said, "It's seven months that I've been going to see the best doctors. I still have the pain and it's really not possible to train like that. I didn't have the ability to reach my objectives." He performed in many shows in Switzerland, France, Italy, South Korea and Japan, as well as the Canadian Stars on Ice tour.

In a 2008 interview, Alexei Mishin called him an "outstanding artist and spins genius" and added that his retirement was an "immense loss". According to Mishin, Lambiel was "strangled by the modern figure skating regulations".

=== 2009–2010 season ===
On 25 July 2009, Lambiel announced that he would return to competitive skating and try to qualify for the 2010 Winter Olympics in Vancouver. Although his training was still slightly affected, he said the injury was under control. He rejoined Peter Grütter in Switzerland.

Lambiel began his season at the 2009 Nebelhorn Trophy, which was the qualifying competition for countries that did not already have Olympic slots. Lambiel finished first in the short with 77.45 points, falling on his quadruple toe-loop but receiving a level four on all of his spins. He also won the free skate with a score of 154.91 points; he landed a quadruple toe loop-double toe loop-double toe loop combination and a triple flip-triple toe loop combination, and received a level four on two of his spins. His program components score was high in both segments of the competition and he won the title with 232.36 points, qualifying Switzerland for the 2010 Winter Olympics.

Lambiel won his ninth national title at the 2010 Swiss Championships. He placed first in both the short program and the free skate to win the gold medal with a total of 244.23 points, 44.78 ahead of Jamal Othman. He then competed in the 2010 European Championships in Tallinn, Estonia, where he placed fifth in the short program with 77.75 points, after having problems with his quadruple toe-loop. He rebounded in the free skate, earning 160.79 points to win the silver medal. His program components score of 85.00 was the highest of the night. Overall, he scored 238.54 points, 16.85 behind Evgeni Plushenko.

Lambiel was the flag bearer for Switzerland at the 2010 Winter Olympics. At the Olympics, he was fifth in the short program with a score of 84.63 points and third in the free skate with a score of 162.09, a new personal best. He finished 4th with 246.72, behind medalists Evan Lysacek, Plushenko and Daisuke Takahashi.

A day after the long program, Lambiel announced that he had long intended to sit out the 2010 World Championships. On 9 March 2010, he announced his retirement from competition.

== Later career ==
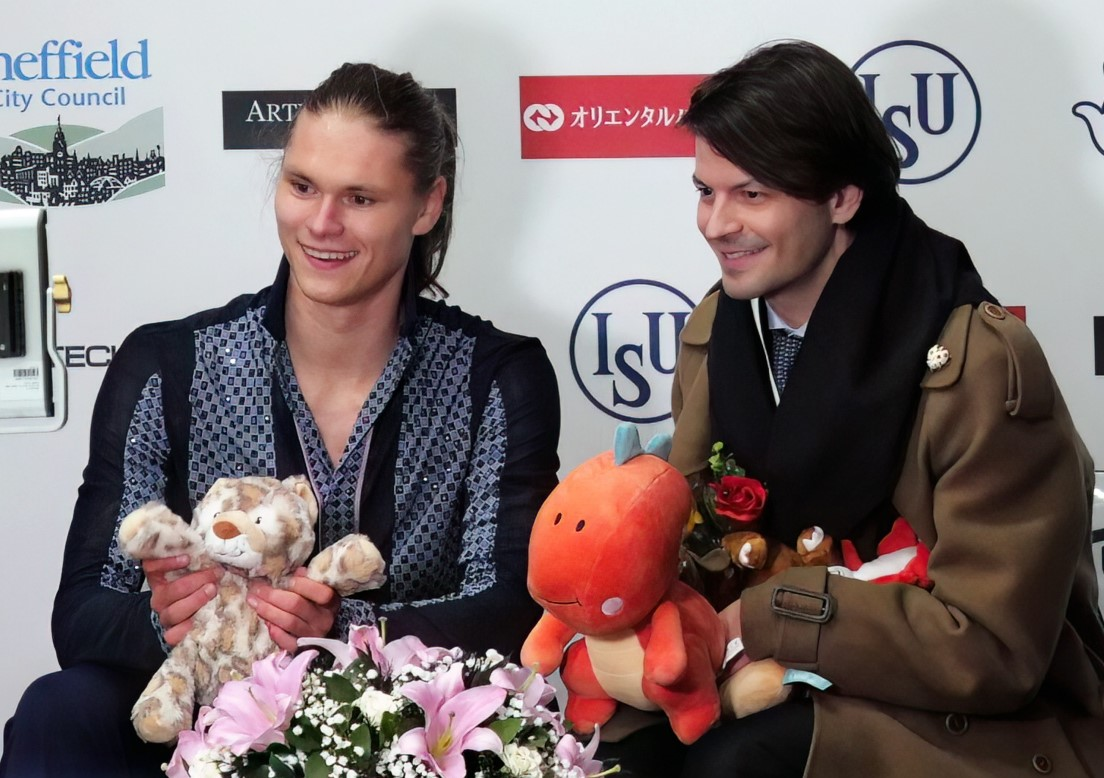
Lambiel with longtime student Deniss Vasiljevs at the 2022 MK John Wilson Trophy

=== Ice shows ===
Lambiel competed in a new ABC skating series, Thin Ice, which aired on 19 March 2010, after announcing his retirement from competition on 9 March 2010. He was paired with Shizuka Arakawa, and the two finished third, winning a total of $45,000. They skated to "Get Me Bodied" by Beyoncé and "Magic" by Robin Thicke. As a result of his participation in the show, he lost his ISU eligibility. After negotiations, the ISU allowed him to perform in the exhibition gala at the 2011 European Championships in Switzerland.

Lambiel performed in the Kings On Ice tour in Russia, alongside Brian Joubert, Johnny Weir and Evgeni Plushenko. He also took part in ice shows in Sweden, Eastern Europe, Germany, Japan, China, South Korea, and Kazakhstan, including All That Skate, headlined by Yuna Kim, and Opera On Ice.

Lambiel had been the headliner of the ice show Art on Ice. It is most often held in Lausanne and Zürich, Switzerland. He skated a duet with Carolina Kostner in 2012. In 2019, he announced that this year was his last appearance at Art on Ice after 17 years of participation. Lambiel is also one of the main cast members alongside Yuzuru Hanyu and Johnny Weir at the annual touring show Fantasy on Ice in Japan. He has participated in all editions of the tour since its inauguration in 2010.

In 2014, he produced his own show, Ice Legends, to honor the 150th anniversary of diplomatic relations between Japan and Switzerland.

=== Work as choreographer and coach ===
Lambiel started a career as a choreographer. He has choreographed for:

- (Sweden) Matilda Algotsson
- (France) Florent Amodio
- (Japan) Miki Ando
- (Japan) Yuna Aoki
- (United Kingdom) Edward Appleby
- (Czech Republic) Michal Březina
- (Switzerland) Valeriya Ezhova
- (France) Laurence Fournier Beaudry and Guillaume Cizeron
- (Italy) Lara Naki Gutmann
- (South Korea) Huh Ji-yu
- (Kazakhstan) Dias Jirenbayev
- (Switzerland) Sarina Joos
- (Japan) Haru Kakiuchi
- (Estonia) Maria Eliise Kaljuvere
- (Japan) Rika Kihira
- (South Korea) Kim Hyun-gyeom
- (Italy) Carolina Kostner
- (Russia) Yulia Lipnitskaya
- (Japan) Tatsuki Machida
- (Japan) Satoko Miyahara
- (Japan) Nobunari Oda
- (Russia) Alexander Petrov
- (Switzerland) Naoki Rossi
- (United States) Maia Shibutani and Alex Shibutani
- (Japan) Koshiro Shimada
- (Latvia) Sofja Stepčenko
- (Japan) Akiko Suzuki
- (Japan) Daisuke Takahashi
- (Kazakhstan) Denis Ten
- (Russia) Elizaveta Tuktamysheva
- (Japan) Shoma Uno
- (Latvia) Deniss Vasiljevs
- (Switzerland) Ean Weiler
- (Germany) Nelli Zhiganshina / Alexander Gazsi

Around 2011, Lambiel also started coaching. In 2014, he founded Skating School of Switzerland in Champéry. In an interview, he acknowledged the influence of Peter Grütter and Jacques Gerschwiler as skating coaches.

His current students include:

- (Switzerland) Valeriya Ezhova
- (Estonia) Maria Eliise Kaljuvere
- (Latvia) Sofja Stepcenko
- (Latvia) Deniss Vasiļjevs - coached by Lambiel to become the 2022 European bronze medalist and a two-time Olympian.
- (Switzerland) Ean Weiler
- (Italy) Raffaele Francesco Zich

His former students include:

- (Sweden) Matilda Algotsson
- (Italy) Paolo Bacchini
- (Switzerland) Noah Bodenstein
- (Switzerland) Noémie Bodenstein
- (Japan) Rika Kihira
- (Switzerland) Alexia Paganini
- (Hungary) Vivien Papp
- (Japan) Koshiro Shimada
- (Japan) Shoma Uno - coached by Lambiel until his retirement to become the 2022 Olympic bronze medalist (men's singles), a 2022 Olympic silver team medalist, a two-time World champion (2022 and 2023), and the 2022-23 Grand Prix Final champion.

=== Other work ===
Lambiel has many sponsors in Switzerland. In 2007, he designed a Swiss watch called the Spin Master. Lambiel's sponsors included Ford Motor Company, Hublot and Swisscom. In 2007, he appeared in a TV commercial for Fuji Xerox in Japan and Swiss Farmers Union's campaign. He voiced himself for a cameo appearance in the 2016 figure skating anime series Yuri on Ice.

Lambiel supports Moi pour Toit, an NGO involved in building homes and schools for the deprived children of Colombia. He has worked as an ambassador of SOS Children's Villages, visiting the villages in Korea and Vietnam.

== Programs ==
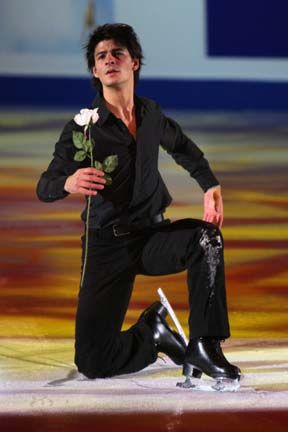
Lambiel during the exhibition at the 2007-2008 Grand Prix Final

=== Post-2010 ===
Season	Exhibition
2022	Lost by Dermot Kennedy; This Bitter Earth/On the Nature of Daylight by Max Richter, choreo. by Salomé Brunner; Overture/Sun And Moon from Miss Saigon, choreo. by Stéphane Lambiel and Satoko Miyahara
2019–2020	Down the Road by C2C; String Quartet No. 1 in F Major by Ludwig van Beethoven, choreo. by Kenta Kojiri
2018–2019	Four Impromptus, D. 899 (Op. 90) No. 4 in A Flat Major by Franz Schubert, performed by Khatia Buniatishvili, choreo. by Salomé Brunner; I Love You by Toshi, choreo. by Salomé Brunner; Goodbye My Lover by James Blunt; Down the Road by C2C, performed by Stefanie Heinzmann; Son of God by Michael W. Smith; Merry Christmas Mr. Lawrence by Ryuichi Sakamoto; Ne me quitte pas by Jacques Brel, in memory of Denis Ten
2017–2018	Nocturne in C minor, Op. 48, No.1 by Frédéric Chopin, a duet with Deniss Vasiljevs, choreo. by Kenta Kojiri; Slave to the Music by James Morrison; Read All About It, Pt. III by Emeli Sandé; Schindler's List by John Williams, performed by Tina Guo; "Echo and Narcissus" - Cheek to Cheek by Irving Berlin, performed by Andrea Bocelli and Zara; "Penelope and Ulysses" - Casta Diva by Vincenzo Bellini, performed by Ana Petričević
2016–2017	Sometimes It Snows in April by Prince, Wendy & Lisa; Merry Christmas Mr. Lawrence by Ryuichi Sakamoto; Slave to the Music by James Morrison; The Four Seasons by Antonio Vivaldi, Max Richter, skated with Deniss Vasiļjevs; Let It Snow! Let It Snow! Let It Snow! by Jule Styne, Sammy Cahn; Nessun dorma by Giacomo Puccini; performed by Andrea Bocelli; Thinking Out Loud by Ed Sheeran / Bring Me to Life by Evanescence
2015–2016	Poeta (Flamenco) by Vicente Amigo, choreo. by Antonio Najarro; La valse by Maurice Ravel; performed by Kotaro Fukuma; performed by Khatia Buniatishvili; Nobody's Perfect by Jessie J; Gone Too Soon by Michael Jackson; Nessun dorma by Giacomo Puccini; performed by Norimasa Fujisawa; performed by Markus Müller; performed by Enrique Ferrer; Take Me to Church by Hozier
2014–2015	Prelude in G minor, Op. 23, No. 5 by Sergei Rachmaninoff; performed by Kotaro Fukuma; performed by Vladimir Satylganov; Sense by Tom Odell; Try by Nelly Furtado; Nessun dorma by Giacomo Puccini; performed by Tomotaka Okamoto; performed by Enrique Ferrer; Say I Wanna Know by Nick Waterhouse
2013–2014	The Water by Hurts; Piano Concerto in A minor, Op.16 by Edvard Grieg; performed by Khatia Buniatishvili; performed by Shon Eun Jung; performed by Vladimir Satylganov; Ave Maria by Franz Schubert; Votre toast (from Carmen) by Georges Bizet
2012–2013	A Chorus Line by Marvin Hamlisch; Run performed by Leona Lewis; Paint It Black by The Rolling Stones; Caruso by Lucio Dalla; Je veux vivre (from Roméo et Juliette) by Charles Gounod, skated with Carolina Kostner
2011–2012	Something Got Me Started by Simply Red; Puttin' On the Ritz: Summertime by Nina Simone; Alejandro by Lady Gaga; Puttin' On the Ritz by Rufus Wainwright; My Body Is a Cage by Arcade Fire, performed by Rhonda Dorsey; La donna è mobile (from Rigoletto) by Giuseppe Verdi; Violin Concerto in D major, Op. 35 by Pyotr Ilyich Tchaikovsky
2010–2011	Prelude in G minor, Op. 23, No. 5 by Sergei Rachmaninoff; performed by Lang Lang; Don't Stop the Music by Jamie Cullum; Trouble by Dima Bilan; I'll Stand By You by Kim Wilde; Last Dance by Donna Summer; Bring Me to Life by Evanescence

=== Pre-2010 ===
Season	Short program	Free skating	Exhibition
2009–2010	William Tell Overture by Gioachino Rossini	La traviata by Giuseppe Verdi; Otoño Porteño by Astor Piazzolla and Ensamble Nuevo Tango	Let the Good Times Roll by Ray Charles; In Your Eyes by Anastacia; Ne me quitte pas by Jacques Brel
2008–2009	Did not compete this season		Otoño Porteño by Astor Piazzolla; Tainted Love by Paul Young; Freak like Me by Sugababes
2007–2008	Carne Cruda by Fernando Egozcue	Poeta (Flamenco) by Vicente Amigo choreo. by Antonio Najarro	Un Giorno Per Noi (from Romeo and Juliet (1968 film)) by Nino Rota performed by Josh Groban; Father And Son by Ronan Keating; Gimme More; SexyBack by Britney Spears, Justin Timberlake
2006–2007	Blood Diamond by James Newton Howard; Geissel Drama by Christine Lauterburg	Poeta by Vicente Amigo choreo. by Antonio Najarro; The Four Seasons by Antonio Vivaldi	Fix You by Coldplay; New Shoes by Paolo Nutini; Stayin' Alive by Robin Gibb
2005–2006	Dralion by Cirque du Soleil; Malaguena (from Once Upon a Time in Mexico) performed by Maxime Rodriguez	The Four Seasons by Antonio Vivaldi	You're Beautiful by James Blunt; If I Hadn't Got You by Lisa Stansfield; I Don't Want to Be by Gavin DeGraw; Fix You by Coldplay
2004–2005	Spanish Caravan by George Winston	King Arthur by Hans Zimmer; The Truman Show by Philip Glass, Burkhard Dallwitz	E Lucevan e Le Stelle (from Tosca) by Florent Pagny; Light My Fire by The Doors; Killer by Seal; Billie Jean by Michael Jackson; Oceania by Björk
2003–2004	I'm a Doun For Lack o' Johnnie (A Little Scottish Fantasy) performed by Vanessa-Mae; Objection (techno remix) by Shakira	Zabuca by Johannes Linstead; Loving Paris (from Buddha Bar IV); Gypsy Dance by Edvin Marton	Take the Long Way Home by Supertramp
2002–2003	Laissez-moi Me Griser by Maurice El Médiouni, Orchestra Salon Oriental	Chocolat by Rachel Portman; Piano Concerto by E. Künnecke	Magic Stradivarius by Edvin Marton; La Vie Fait Ce Qu'Elle Veut by Julie Zenatti
2001–2002	Vuelvo Al Sur; Ya Basta! by Gotan Project's Revancha del Tango	Quidam by Cirque du Soleil by Benoît Jutras	Born by Bond
1999–2001	La cumparsita by Xavier Cugat	Triton by Joseph Racaille	

== Competitive highlights ==
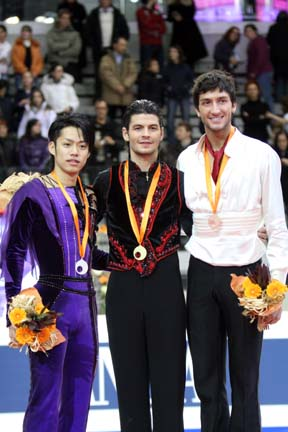
Lambiel (center) at the 2007–08 Grand Prix Final.

GP: Grand Prix; JGP: Junior Grand Prix

International
Event	97–98	98–99	99–00	00–01	01–02	02–03	03–04	04–05	05–06	06–07	07–08	08–09	09–10
Olympics					15th				2nd				4th
Worlds					18th	10th	4th	1st	1st	3rd	5th		
Europeans				9th	4th	5th	6th	4th	2nd		2nd		2nd
GP Final									1st		1st		
GP Cup of China									2nd		3rd		
GP Cup of Russia							5th		2nd		2nd		
GP Skate Canada										1st			
GP Trophée Lalique					6th								
Nebelhorn Trophy													1st
Nepela Memorial						1st							
Finlandia Trophy					11th								
Etoiles Glace						1st							
International: Junior or novice
Junior Worlds			10th	5th									
JGP China		8th											
JGP France		8th		9th									
JGP Japan			3rd										
JGP Mexico				2nd									
JGP Norway			7th										
EYOF		2nd J											
National
Swiss Champ.	1st J	1st J		1st	1st	1st	1st	1st	1st	1st	1st		1st
Team events
Japan Open									3rd T 1st P		2nd T 2nd P		1st T 1st P

Olympic Games
Preceded by Philipp Schoch	Flagbearer for Switzerland; Vancouver 2010	Succeeded by Simon Ammann
