= Fantasy on Ice =

Annual touring ice show in Japan

Fantasy on Ice ファンタジー・オン・アイス
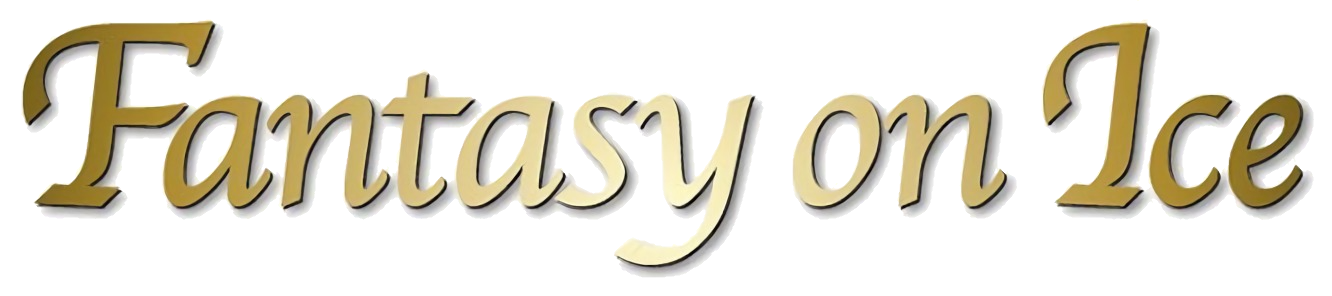

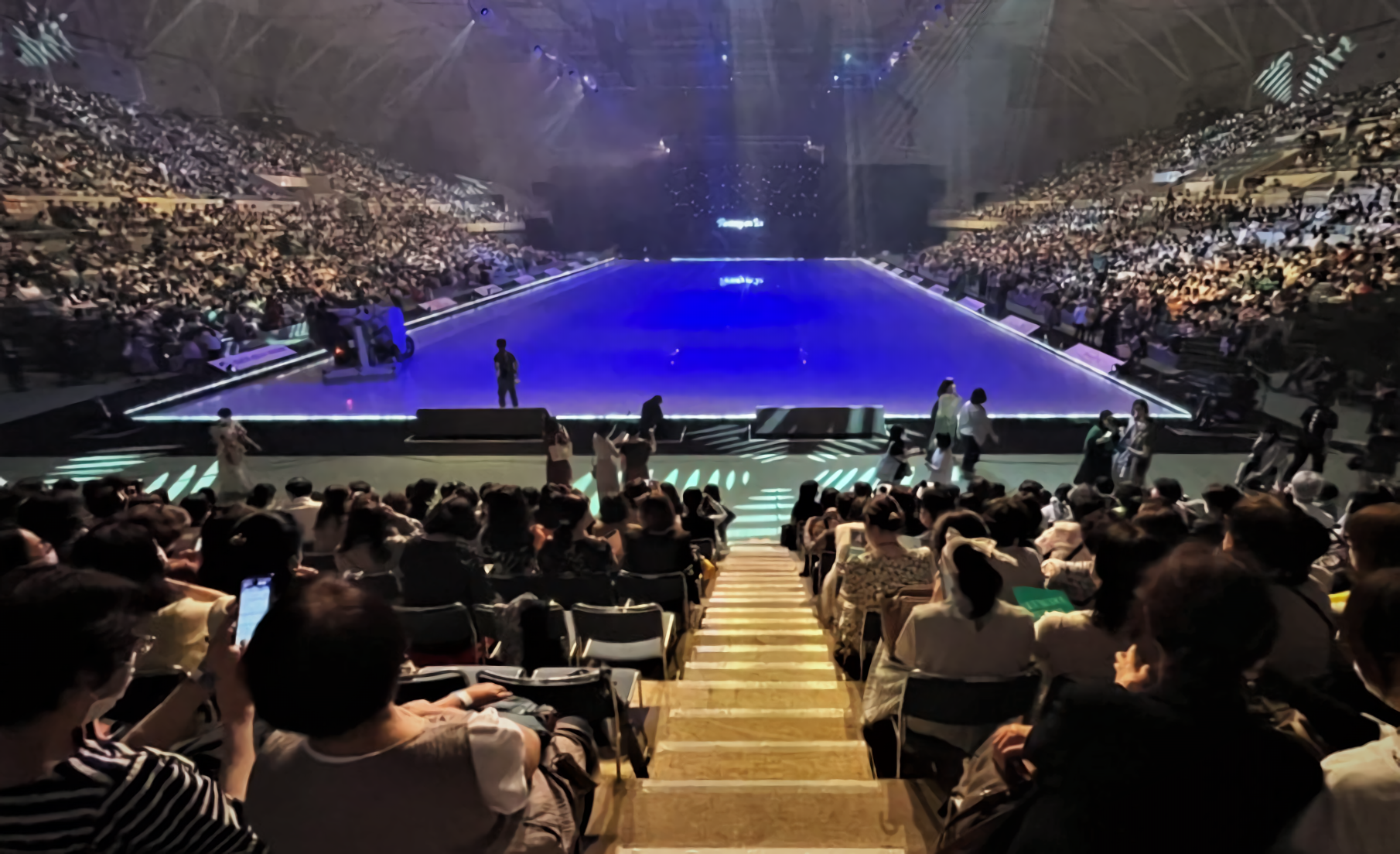
- Front view of the skating rink at the 2022 Fantasy on Ice in Shizuoka
- Ice show type: Touring ensemble show
- Format: Figure skating exhibitions; Aerial and ice acrobatics; Live music collaborations
- Cast size: 15–20 skaters, multiple acrobats
- Duration: 180 minutes
- Start date: End of May
- End date: End of June
- No. of shows: 12
- Legs: 2 (A and B tour)
- Frequency: Annual
- First held: 2010
- Status: Ongoing
- Country: Japan
- Cinema live viewing: Japan
- Broadcast: TV Asahi among others
- Producer: Kikuo Makabe CEO
- Organizer: CIC Co., Ltd.
- Sponsor: P&G among others
- Website: fantasy-on-ice.com

Fantasy on Ice (ファンタジー・オン・アイス) is an annual touring ice show in Japan produced by CIC Co., Ltd. The show emerged from the "Philippe Candeloro Japan Tour 2001", named after retired French figure skater Philippe Candeloro, and was held under the name "Fantasy on Ice" the following two years. After a seven-year break, the tour was revived in 2010 and got expanded to larger venues in the metropolitan area of Tokyo in 2014 and Kobe in 2015.

From 2015 onwards, Fantasy on Ice was held around June, lasting one month and generally involving four stops in different prefectures across Japan. The cast includes active and retired competitive figure skaters, acrobats, and guest artists. Each show features a series of exhibition performances, including multiple live music collaborations between skaters and artists. The professional male single skaters Yuzuru Hanyu, Stéphane Lambiel, and Johnny Weir are the lead cast members of the show, having been scheduled for all Fantasy on Ice tours since its revival in 2010. In 2023, Weir announced his retirement from the show, attending his final tour after 12 participations.

== History ==
=== Beginnings ===
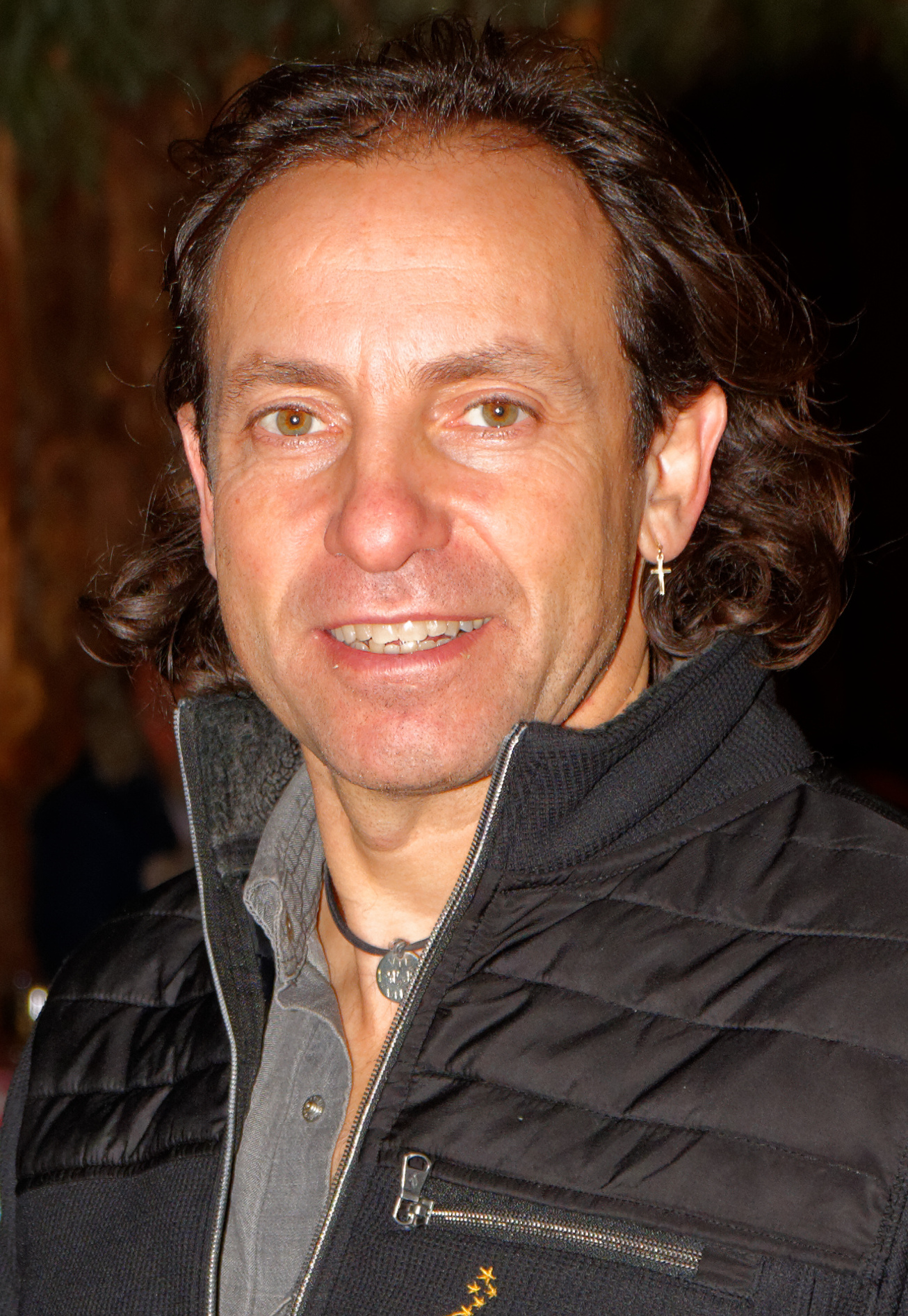
Philippe Candeloro in 2020

The Fantasy on Ice tour traces its roots back to 2001. Kikuo Makabe, representative director of CIC Co., Ltd. and producer of the show, took inspiration from another event held in Lyon the same year. He was impressed by the unconventional concept of combining circus, stage illusion, acrobatics, and other entertainment beyond the confines of a usual ice show. Two-time Olympic bronze medalist Philippe Candeloro from France was the chairman of the event.

Makabe was contacted by Candeloro's agent and they exchanged emails about a potential collaboration project in Japan, which eventually resulted in the "Philippe Candeloro Japan Tour 2001", held in Yokohama in September 2001. Among the guest skaters, besides Candeloro, were five-time European champion Surya Bonaly from France, 1992 Olympic champion Viktor Petrenko from Ukraine, the 1998 Olympic champions in pairs, Oksana Kazakova and Artur Dmitriev, and the ice dance team Maya Usova and Evgeni Platov from Russia.

The show returned in the following years, in November 2002 and March 2003, under the new name "Philippe Candeloro Fantasy on Ice". Makabe and the production team had a "deep attachment to this name", so they registered it as a trademark in 2002 and planned to develop it as its own brand. However, due to financial deficits of another ice show project in France and disagreements between Candeloro and his agent, the collaboration came to an abrupt end and Makabe was forced to start the production of Fantasy on Ice from scratch. In 2006, he brought Champions on Ice, a touring ice show in the United States, to Japan for the first time. In the course of this event, Makabe teamed up with two skaters who would later become an "indispensable part" of Fantasy on Ice; two-time world champion Stéphane Lambiel and 2008 world bronze medalist Johnny Weir.

=== Revival of the show in 2010 ===
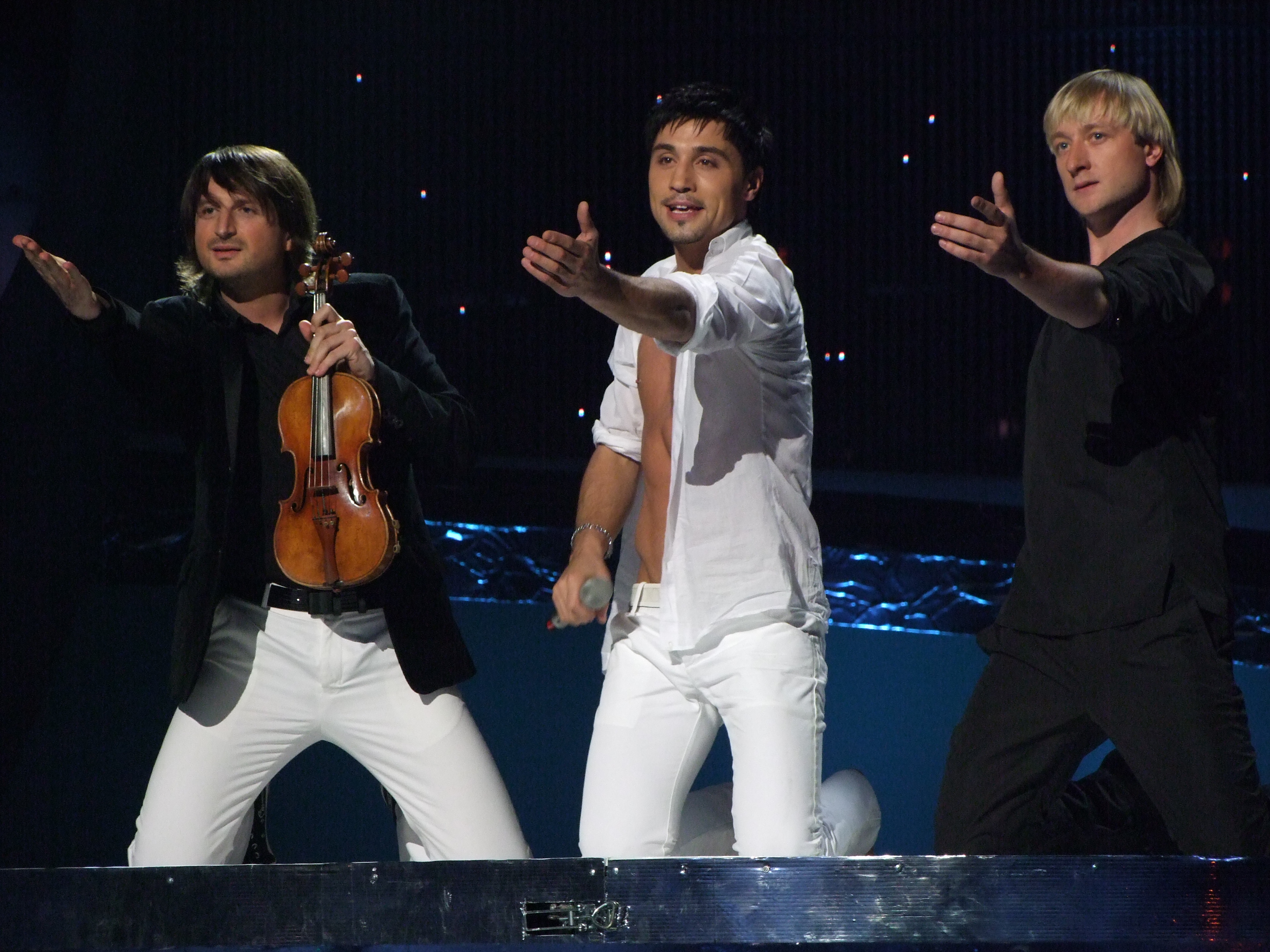
Edvin Marton (left), Dima Bilan (center) and Evgeni Plushenko (right) at the Eurovision Song Contest 2008

After a seven-year break, Fantasy on Ice made its return in 2010. The first tour stop took place in July in the Niigata Convention Center at Toki Messe in Niigata. The show was hosted in partnership with Niigata Sogo Television, who had already worked with Makabe's production team on Champions on Ice and other events in the past. For Makabe, it was important to add live music collaborations with vocalists as a new facet of the show. He invited the Japanese a capella group The Gospellers who performed together at the show with Johnny Weir, 2006 Olympic champion Evgeni Plushenko from Russia, Japanese skater and commentator Junko Yaginuma, and two-time European ice dance champions Nathalie Péchalat and Fabian Bourzat from France. Among the special guests was Spanish flamenco dancer and figure skating choreographer, Antonio Najarro, who choreographed the opening and finale of the show.

There was a two-month break between the first and second tour stop, which was held in September at the Sun Dome Fukui in Echizen. The invited guest artists, Hungarian violinist Edvin Marton and Russian singer Dima Bilan, performed with Evgeni Plushenko their winning song "Believe" from the Eurovision Song Contest 2008. It was the only occasion in the history of the show that the guest artists were not domestic performers from Japan.

=== Impact of the 2011 Tōhoku earthquake ===
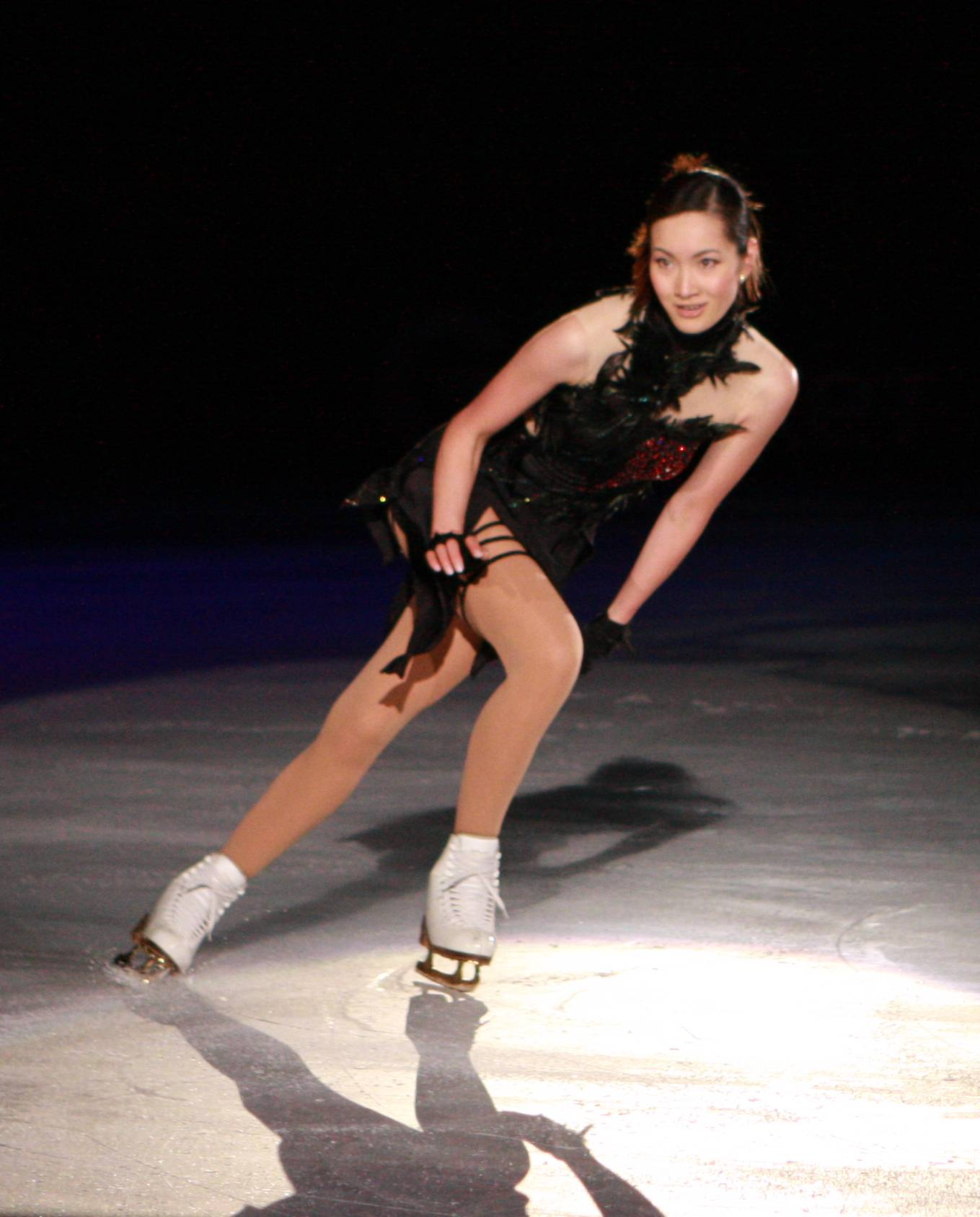
Shizuka Arakawa in 2009

After the 2011 Tōhoku earthquake and tsunami had hit the north east coast of Japan, causing severe devastation in the region, it was unclear whether the Fantasy on Ice tour could be held, as the recovery process was still at the beginning. Two-time Olympic champion Yuzuru Hanyu from Japan, who had just moved up to senior level in competition at that time, lost his practice rink from the disaster in his hometown of Sendai. With the organization of the tour stops in Kanazawa and Fukuoka, Makabe and his team were able to provide Hanyu an opportunity to practice in the period from June to July. "It was impressive to see how the international skaters cared for Hanyu and tried to cheer him up", noted Makabe in his book from 2021. "It was as if I was witnessing Hanyu becoming a symbol of the recovery from the earthquake and tsunami."

Another cast member, who grew up in Sendai with a close connection to the victims of the disaster, was the 2006 Olympic figure skating champion Shizuka Arakawa. She performed at the 2011 Fantasy on Ice with her friend, guest artist Mai Kuraki, to the charity song "Anata ga Irukara". A special recording of their performance was released as a video single on August 31 the same year. Monkey Majik, another Sendai-based pop rock band, was invited to the final tour stop in Niigata in September.

=== Makuhari era ===
During the following two years, the Fantasy on Ice tour was reduced to one stop, with Fukui in September 2012 and Fukuoka in July 2013. Since its revival in 2010, the show had been held exclusively in regional cities of Japan until 2013. The main reason for this decision was the large size of figure skating venues in the metropolitan area of Tokyo, which caused sponsorships to be restrained from a collaboration. However, Hanyu's victory at the 2014 Winter Olympics in Sochi lead to a large increase of interest in figure skating and ice shows around the country. For the first time, Fantasy on Ice added a tour stop in the Tokyo area with the event hall at Makuhari Messe in Chiba. Makabe had special memories of that arena, which had served as a venue for the 1994 World Championships, with Yuka Sato winning gold for Japan and Candeloro the silver medal in the men's event. From 2014 onwards, Makuhari has become a regular event, and the tour was expanded to four stops in total. P&G agreed to sponsor the show. The World Memorial Hall in Kobe was added as the second main stop in 2015.

In the meantime, Hanyu had become an integral member of the Fantasy on Ice cast, having joined each tour since its revival in 2010, with one exception, having missed out on the 2016 edition due to rehabilitation from a ligament injury. Makabe deliberated on the prospects of the show, stating: "It is an undeniable fact that for several years, Hanyu has not only skated the last act, but has been the backbone of the entire show, and I felt that this was the critical moment to test the true value of Fantasy on Ice". However, in Hanyu's absence, the show ran a deficit at the second stop in Sapporo with empty seats in the upper sections. Stéphane Lambiel felt concerned, but Makabe remained optimistic for the events to come.

=== Development after the 2018 Winter Olympics ===
Champions of the individual figure skating events at the 2018 Winter Olympics
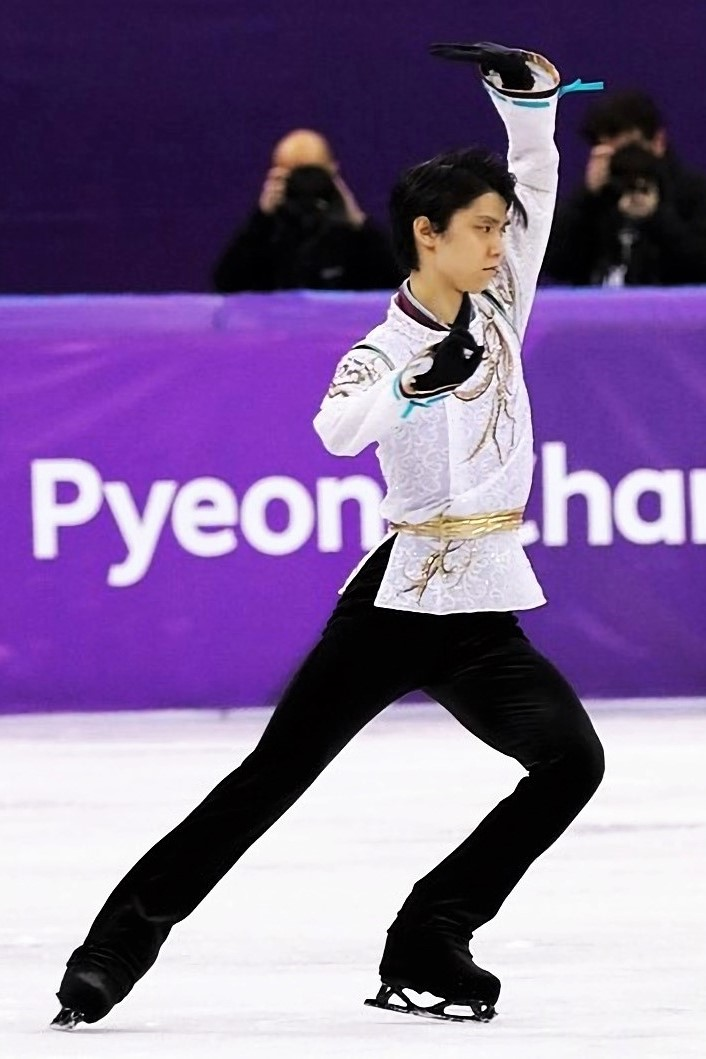
Yuzuru Hanyu

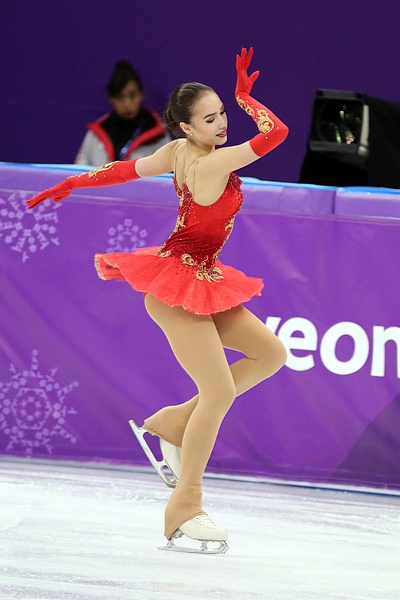
Alina Zagitova

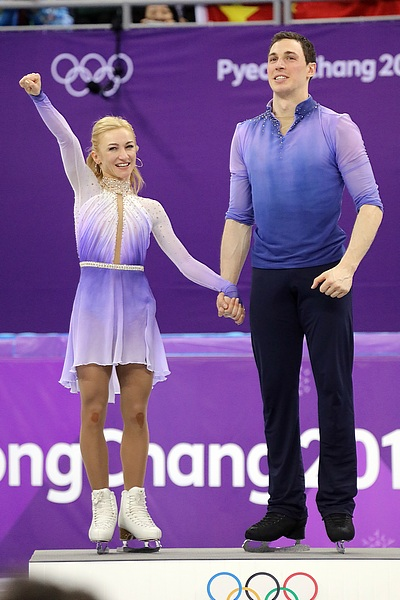
Aljona Savchenko & Bruno Massot

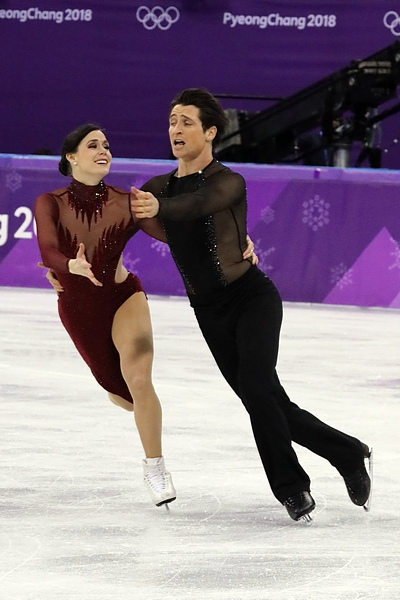
Tessa Virtue & Scott Moir

On the occasion of Hanyu's victory at the 2018 Winter Olympics in Pyeongchang, who had become the first male single skater in 66 years to win back-to-back titles, the Fantasy on Ice tour got expanded to five stops for the first time. With Hanyu, the German pair skaters Aljona Savchenko and Bruno Massot, and the Canadian ice dance team Tessa Virtue and Scott Moir, the cast featured three of the four individual gold medalists of 2018 in figure skating. The Olympic champion in women's singles, Alina Zagitova, joined the tour the following year in 2019.

In the 2019 edition of Fantasy on Ice, the tour was merged with a new Spanish collaboration project; Flamenco on Ice made its debut at the first two stops in Makuhari and Sendai, led by two-time world figure skating champion Javier Fernández and Antonio Najarro. The central idea behind Flamenco on Ice was the fusion of figure skating and flamenco dance. The team included former ice dancer Celia Robledo and the single skaters Javier Raya, Sonia Lafuente, and Fernández' sister Laura. Their performance to "Malagueña" was accompanied by guitarist José Luis Montón, percussionist Odei Lizaso, and the voices of María Mezcle and Saray Muñoz. In a press release, Najarro expressed his satisfaction with the project: "Of all the times I've come to Japan, invited as a choreographer for figure skating shows, this one has been the most gratifying, without a doubt."

In 2020, it was planned to hold an event outside Japan for the first time, at the Shanghai Oriental Sports Center in China. However, due to the COVID-19 pandemic, the event was postponed for an indefinite period of time. In addition, all domestic events were cancelled on April 20, 2020. After another year break in 2021, the tour eventually returned in 2022 with a new stop at the Nippon Gaishi Hall in Nagoya. In 2023, lead cast member Johnny Weir announced his retirement from Fantasy on Ice, attending his final tour after 12 consecutive participations.

== Concept and design of the show ==
=== Procedure of the tour and single shows ===
Since 2015, the Fantasy on Ice tour has typically consisted of four stops in different prefectures of Japan, with Makuhari and Kobe as recurring locations. Each stop lasts three days (from Friday to Sunday) with one show per day, featuring a cast of about twenty figure skaters, a group of aerial and ice acrobats, and multiple guest artists. The shows have an average runtime of three and a half hours with a thirty-minute intermission. They are a mix of live music performances and exhibition programs with sound recordings, such as debuts or revivals of competitive programs. The tour generally starts at the end of May and finishes at the end of June. Usually after the first two tour stops, there are changes in the cast of skaters and invited artists.

The opening and finale of the show feature the full cast, accompanied with live music by the guest artists. The choreographers for the group performances have changed throughout the years. Some notable choreographers were Antonio Najarro, Japanese ice dancer Kenji Miyamoto, two-time Olympic silver medalist Brian Orser, Canadian figure skater David Wilson, and the 2008 world champion, Jeffrey Buttle. The opening theme song "Fantasy on Ice" was composed by Maxime Rodriguez and is played as an instrumental version in the live shows. A special recording with lyrics and vocals by Sarah Àlainn was released by the label Universal Music Japan in 2016. Since the 2017 edition of Fantasy on Ice, the costumes for the opening and finale performances have been designed by Taketoshi Hara.

=== Construction and design of the rink ===
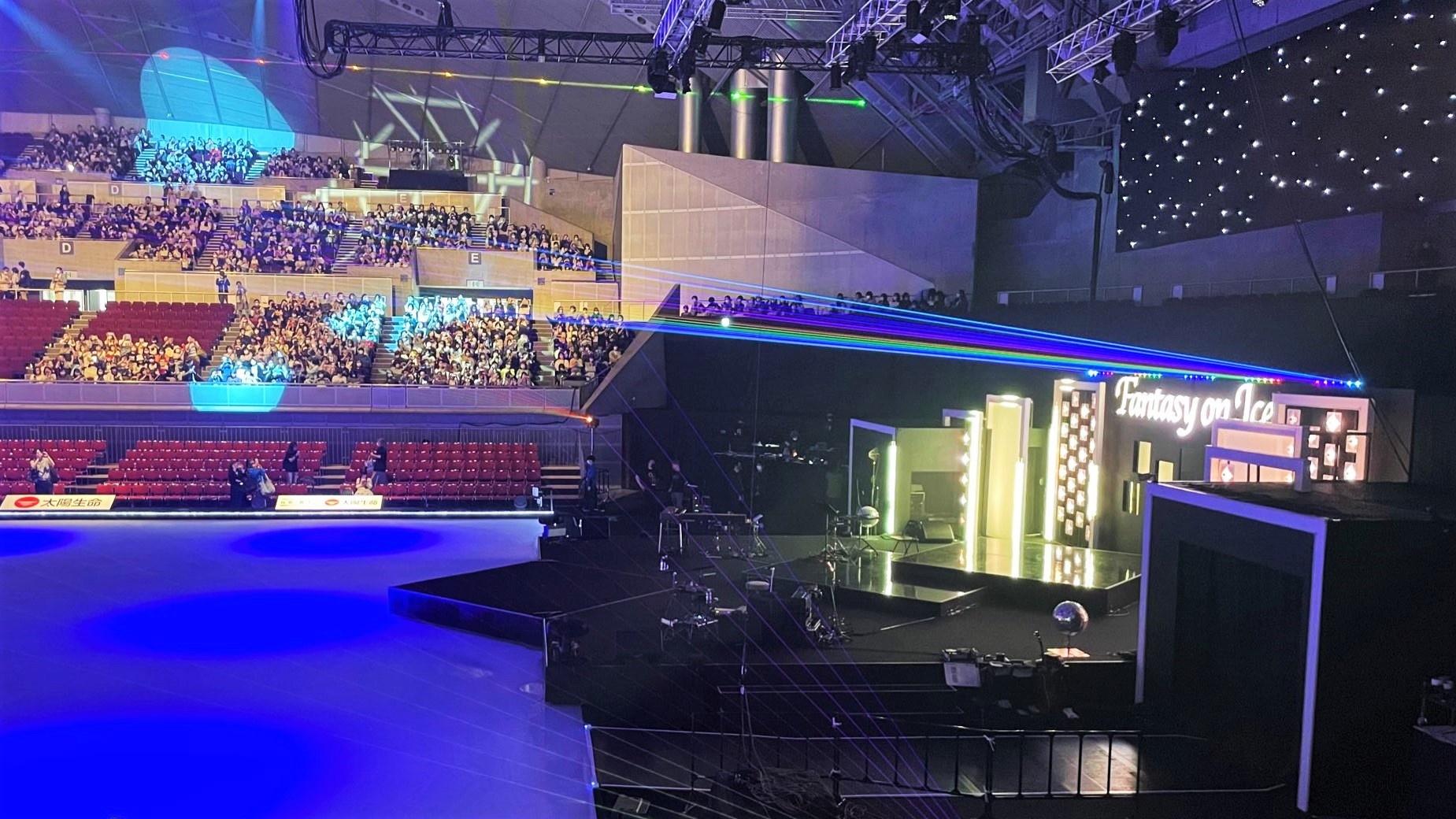
Side view at the mobile stage and ice rink at the 2023 Fantasy on Ice at Makuhari Messe in Chiba

With exception of the Big Hat ice hockey arena in Nagano and the Makomanai Ice Arena in Sapporo, the venues of the past Fantasy on Ice shows did not have a permanent ice rink, so it was necessary to resort to mobile rinks, a technology which had been used since the 1950s at shows like Ice Capades. Fantasy on Ice uses the Icerack system, developed by the German company ISS GmbH. The workers have a setup time of two days, while the disassembly must be completed within twelve hours.

The rink has dimensions of 50 m × 25 m, which equals 70 percent of the size of an Olympic figure skating rink (60 m × 30 m). In comparison to competitions, the rink at Fantasy on Ice has no boards, so the audience has full view at the skaters from all angles. The stage is placed directly next to the ice surface, while the spectator seats surround the rink from the other three sides. In some venues like the Nippon Gaishi Hall in Nagoya, there were also seats available behind the stage, but the audience had only limited view at the guest artists from that perspective.

Since the show's revival in 2010, various improvements had been made in terms of sound and lighting. One of the biggest challenges was a proper merge of the live music played on the stage, and the recorded sound from speakers installed at the ceiling, which required adjustments in the equipment, volume level, and placement of the speakers. Another issue was the limited number of pinspots around the rink, which made it difficult to follow all skaters in group performances at the same time. Hence, the production team focused on the effective use of laser lighting for the show.

=== Live music collaborations ===
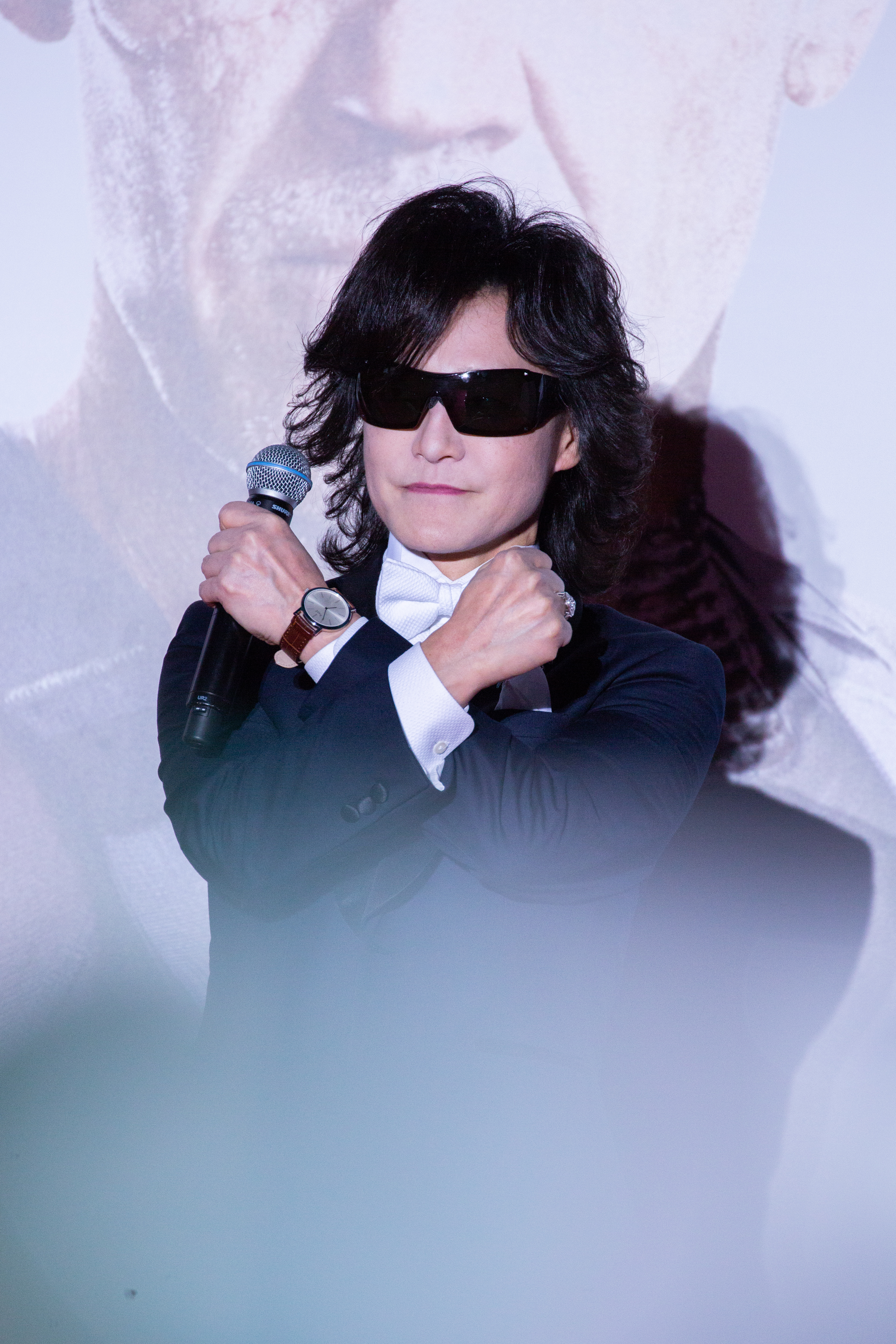
Toshi in 2018

For producer Kikuo Makabe, the core of the show are the live music collaborations between skaters and artists. Unlike competitions and usual exhibition galas, where the skaters use sound recordings with familiar timing and constant tempo, the tempo and tone of the singing voice naturally fluctuates during a live performance, which makes the synchronisation of the music and skating more difficult. The collaborations with domestic artists are an additional challenge on the parts of overseas skaters, who need to translate the Japanese lyrics and understand their meaning, so that they can properly express the song through their skating. On the other hand, it is a unique opportunity to experience the fusion of two artistic genres in one performance.

A show opening that attracted international media attention was a live music version of "A Cruel Angel's Thesis" from the anime series Neon Genesis Evangelion. The song was performed by the Japanese pop rock singer Toshi and the cast of the 2019 Fantasy on Ice in Kobe and Toyama. Notable is also the collaboration between the Yoshida Brothers, a duo of tsugaru-shamisen musicians, and Javier Fernández to the song "Barcelona". Kenichi Yoshida, the younger of the two brothers, had been in Barcelona as an exchange envoy of the Agency for Cultural Affairs in 2015, few months prior to the ice show in Japan.

Some skaters performed live music versions of previous competitive programs like Alina Zagitova's free skate program Carmen Fantasy to the violin play of Mayuko Suenobu in 2019. Another notable performance was Nobunari Oda's short program to "Storm" from the 2010–11 season, which he performed live with the Yoshida Brothers at the 2016 Fantasy on Ice.

Usually, it is Makabe and the production team who select and invite the guest artists. However, in some cases the cast members asked for special collaborations on their own accord. Junko Yaginuma and the Gospellers were alumni of the same university and wished to perform together in 2010. Singer Ai was introduced to the production team by Miki Ando, who was a big fan of the Japanese singer and songwriter. The two performed together to the song "Dear Mama" in 2013, after Ando had given birth to her child the previous year.

Since his first collaboration project at the 2012 Fantasy on Ice, Yuzuru Hanyu has dedicated a series of programs to the victims of the 2011 Tōhoku earthquake and tsunami. In 2012, he performed live with singer Fumiya Sashida to the Japanese song "Hana ni nare". More tribute programs followed, among them a live performance with Ai to "Story" in 2013 as well as a special instrumental version of Yumi Matsutoya's song "Haru yo, koi", played by pianist Shinya Kiyozuka, in 2018. The latter was reused by Hanyu in multiple exhibition galas the following years and received international recognition at the 2022 Winter Olympics in Beijing.

== Attendance and accessibility ==
=== Ticket sales and live viewing events ===
The capacity of the venues varies between 5,000 and 10,000 seats, usually divided into six different price categories. Since the inauguration of the venue in Kobe in 2015, prices had been mostly consistent with ¥7,000 (US$52 as of 2022) and ¥10,000 in the lower categories, having been raised to ¥8,000 and ¥12,000 in 2022. Prices for premiere seats went from ¥22,000 to ¥27,000, depending on the weekday and venue. The profitability of the show has varied throughout the years, with some events having run deficits like the 2016 tour stop in Sapporo. In 2022, tickets were distributed by lottery sale with full ranks in Makuhari among others.

Due to the high ticket demand in 2022, it was decided to stream the Sunday shows of all four tour stops live at cinemas in different prefectures across Japan. On June 5, the show in Nagoya was aired live in 90 movie theaters nationwide. In addition to the domestic live viewing events, the final show in Kobe was planned to be aired at four participating cinemas in Taiwan, with all tickets being sold out within a day. As a reaction to the fast sales, another two movie theaters in the cities Taipei and Tainan were added. Tickets were sold at fixed prices for ¥4,000 in Japan and NT$1,000 (US$34 as of 2022) in Taiwan.

=== Television broadcast and media coverage ===
Selected shows, usually the final events on Sunday, were broadcast live or with few weeks delay on Japanese television. In 2022, most shows were aired on the subscription channel CS TV Asahi. Some archived recordings from previous years were replayed as specials like the "2022 Golden Week Figure Skating Broadcast" on CS TV Asahi from May 29 to June 5. As of June 2022, the Fantasy on Ice show was not planned to be broadcast or livestreamed outside Japan, which made it particularly difficult for international audience to access recordings of the events. In August 2022, Fantasy on Ice uploaded various recordings of the opening performances from Kobe and Shizuoka to their official YouTube channel.

Since its beginnings with the "Philippe Candeloro Japan Tour 2001", Fantasy on Ice has been covered by various Japanese figure skating mooks and magazines like World Figure Skating, Kiss & Cry or Figure Skate Life. In later years, more general news and sports magazines followed with Aera, Sports Graphic Number, and Sportiva among others. Fantasy on Ice also sells its own pamphlet with summaries of the shows, interviews with the cast members, backstage footage, and more. In addition, various photobooks and online image galleries of the shows were published by the renowned figure skating photographers Sunao Noto, Yukihito Taguchi, and Nobuaki Tanaka. A special slide gallery of the opening show in Makuhari 2022 was presented on the website of the Japanese daily newspaper Yomiuri Shimbun, with photographies by Kazuki Wakasugi.

== Locations and venues ==
Locations of the Fantasy on Ice tour in central Japan
Locations of the Fantasy on Ice tour in other regions

List of venues sorted chronologically by debut year at Fantasy on Ice
Debut	Venue	City	Prefecture	Capacity	Image
2010	Toki Messe (Niigata Convention Center)	Niigata	Niigata	10,000	Outdoor view of the Niigata Convention Center at Toki Messe in Niigata city
2010	Sun Dome Fukui	Echizen	Fukui	10,000	Outdoor view of the Sun Dome Fukui stadium in Echizen
2011	Ishikawa Sports Center	Kanazawa	Ishikawa	5,000	Outdoor view of the Ishikawa Sports Center in Kanazawa
2011	Fukuoka Convention Center (Marine Messe Fukuoka)	Fukuoka	Fukuoka	15,000	Outdoor view of the Marine Messe Fukuoka stadium in Fukuoka city
2014	Makuhari Messe (Makuhari Event Hall)	Chiba (near Tokyo)	Chiba	10,000	Outdoor view of the Makuhari Event Hall in Chiba city
2014	Toyama City Gymnasium	Toyama	Toyama	5,000	Outdoor view of the Toyama City Gymnasium sporting arena in Toyama city
2015	Ecopa Arena	Fukuroi	Shizuoka	10,000	Outdoor side view of the Ecopa Arena in Fukuroi
2015	World Memorial Hall	Kobe	Hyōgo	8,000	Outdoor view of the World Memorial Hall in Kobe
2016	Makomanai Ice Arena	Sapporo	Hokkaidō	10,000	Outdoor view of the Makomanai Ice Arena in Sapporo
2016	Big Hat	Nagano	Nagano	10,000	Outdoor view of the Big Hat ice hockey arena in Nagano city
2019	Sekisui Heim Super Arena	Rifu (near Sendai)	Miyagi	7,000	Outdoor view of the Sekisui Heim Super Arena in Rifu
2022	Nippon Gaishi Hall	Nagoya	Aichi	10,000	Outdoor view of the Nippon Gaishi Hall in Nagoya
2024	Aichi Sky Expo	Tokoname	Aichi	10,000	Outdoor view of Aichi Sky Expo

== Editions and guest artists ==
Chronological list of tour stops and guest artists
Tour	Place	Date	Guest artists
2010	Niigata	July 10–11	Gospellers
2010	Fukui	September 11–12	Dima Bilan, Edvin Marton
2011	Kanazawa	June 18–19	Mai Kuraki
2011	Fukuoka	July 2–3	Mai Kuraki
2011	Niigata	September 3–4	Mai Kuraki, Monkey Majik
2012	Fukui	September 1–2	Crystal Kay, Fumiya Sashida
2013	Fukuoka	July 6–7	Ai
2014	Makuhari	June 7–8	Hiromi Go
2014	Toyama	July 5–6	Sarah Àlainn
2014	Niigata	July 12–13	Sarah Àlainn
2015	Makuhari	May 29–31	Che'Nelle
2015	Shizuoka	June 6–7	Che'Nelle
2015	Kanazawa	June 26–28	Sarah Àlainn, Kotaro Fukuma, Tomotaka Okamoto
2015	Kobe	July 4–5	Sarah Àlainn, Kotaro Fukuma, Tomotaka Okamoto
2016	Makuhari	May 27–29	Norimasa Fujisawa, Kotaro Fukuma, Tomomi Kahara
2016	Sapporo	June 3–5	Norimasa Fujisawa, Kotaro Fukuma, Tomomi Kahara
2016	Kobe	June 17–19	Chemistry, Kotaro Fukuma, Norie Suzuki, Yoshida Brothers
2016	Nagano	June 24–26	Chemistry, Kotaro Fukuma, Norie Suzuki, Yoshida Brothers
2017	Makuhari	May 26–28	Shinya Kiyozuka, Keizo Nakanishi, Maki Ohguro
2017	Kobe	June 9–11	Anri, Norimasa Fujisawa, Kohshi Kishita
2017	Niigata	June 16–18	Anri, Norimasa Fujisawa, Kohshi Kishita
2018	Makuhari	May 25–27	Chemistry, May J., Emiri Miyamoto
2018	Kanazawa	June 1–3	Chemistry, May J., Emiri Miyamoto
2018	Kobe	June 15–17	Norimasa Fujisawa, Kaori Kishitani, Shinya Kiyozuka
2018	Niigata	June 22–24	Norimasa Fujisawa, Kaori Kishitani, Shinya Kiyozuka
2018	Shizuoka	June 29 – July 1	Norimasa Fujisawa, Kaori Kishitani, Shinya Kiyozuka
2019	Makuhari	May 24–26	Beni, Mayuko Suenobu, Toshi
2019	Sendai	May 31 – June 2	Beni, Mayuko Suenobu, Toshi
2019	Kobe	June 7–9	May J., Mayuko Suenobu, Toshi
2019	Toyama	June 14–16	May J., Mayuko Suenobu, Toshi
2020	Not held due to the COVID-19 pandemic		
2021	Not held due to the COVID-19 pandemic		
2022	Makuhari	May 27–29	Harumi, Kohmi Hirose, Shikao Suga
2022	Nagoya	June 3–5	Harumi, Kohmi Hirose, Shikao Suga
2022	Kobe	June 17–19	Taisei Miyakawa, Naoto, Seiko Niizuma
2022	Shizuoka	June 24–26	Taisei Miyakawa, Naoto, Seiko Niizuma
2023	Makuhari	May 26–28	Issa and Kimi from Da Pump, Rimi Natsukawa, Miho Fukuhara
2023	Miyagi	June 2–4	Issa and Kimi from Da Pump, Rimi Natsukawa, Miho Fukuhara
2023	Niigata	June 16–18	Aimi Mukohara, Mika Nakashima, Dean Fujioka, Touya Kobayashi
2023	Kobe	June 23–25	Aimi Mukohara, Mika Nakashima, Dean Fujioka, Touya Kobayashi
2024	Makuhari	May 24–26	Takanori Nishikawa, Yu Shirota, Rei Yasuda
2024	Aichi	May 31 – June 2	Takanori Nishikawa, Yu Shirota, Rei Yasuda
2024	Kobe	June 15–16	Tatsuya Ishii, Yo Hitoto, Leo Ieiri
2024	Shizuoka	June 22–23	Tatsuya Ishii, Yo Hitoto, Leo Ieiri
2025	Makuhari	May 31 - June 1	Yu Shirota, Harumi Tsuyuzaki, Eliana エリアンナ
2026	Makuhari	May 30-31	Shota Yasuda, Sung Si-kyung, Leo Ieiri

== Skaters ==
=== Main cast ===
Main cast of Fantasy on Ice 2023
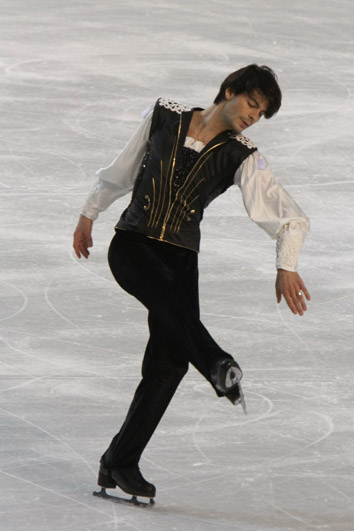
Stéphane Lambiel

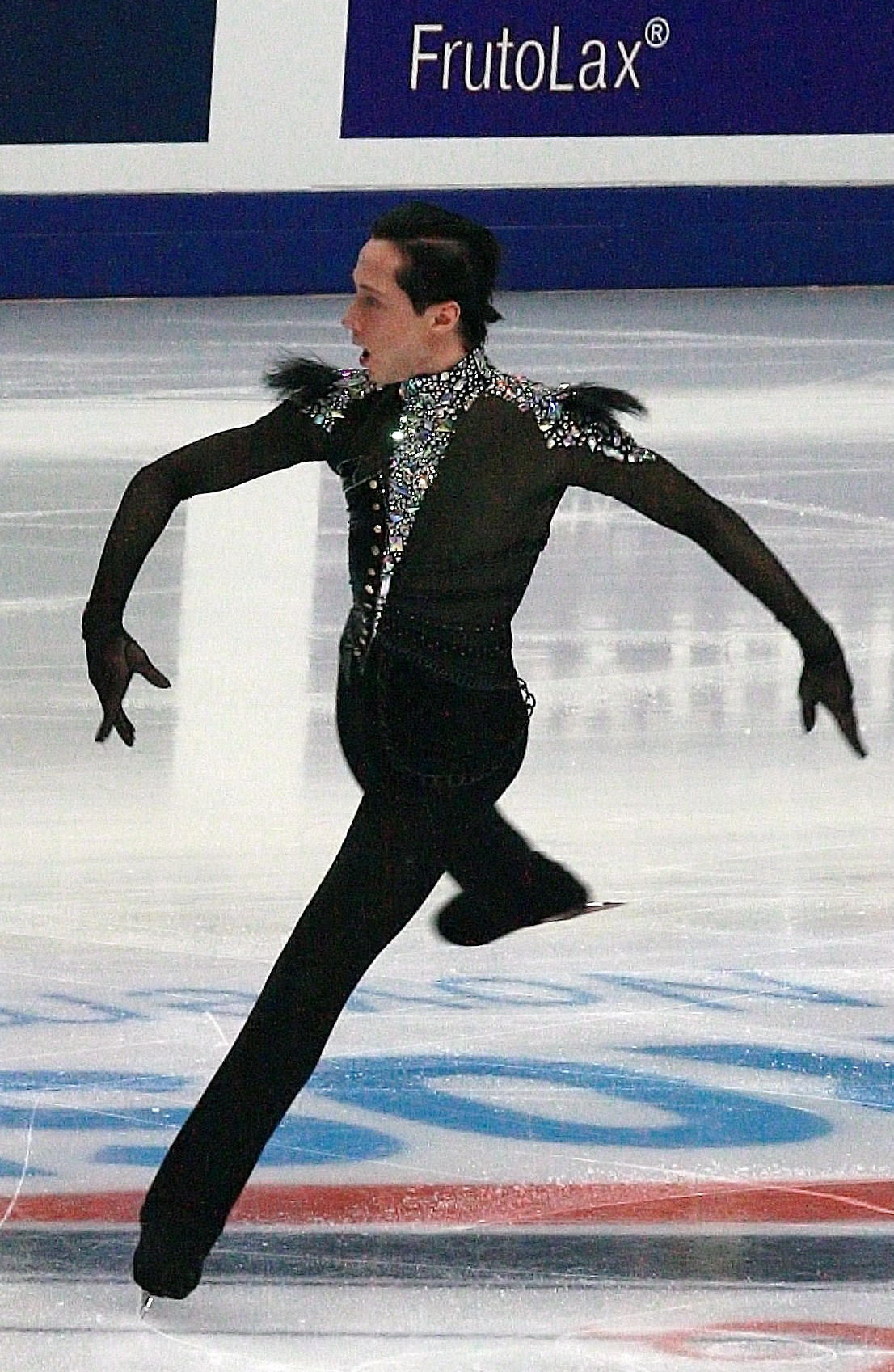
Johnny Weir

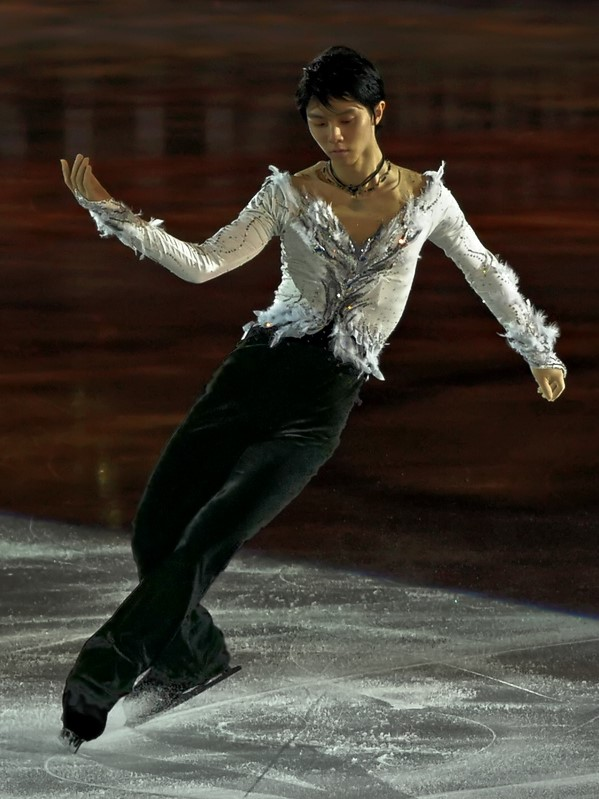
Yuzuru Hanyu

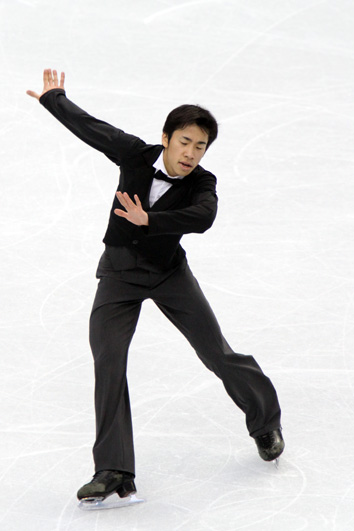
Nobunari Oda

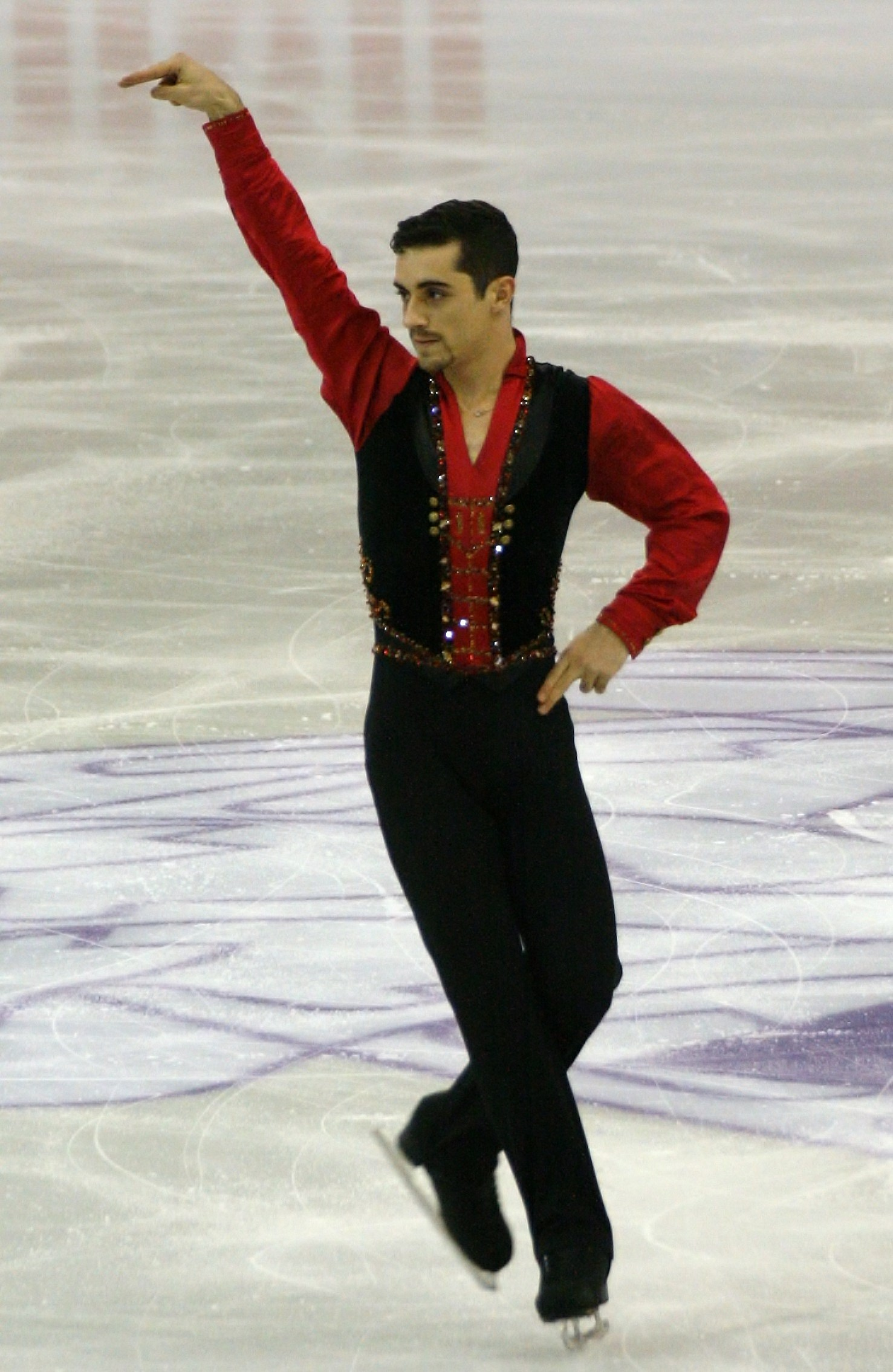
Javier Fernández

List of recurring cast members by number of participations
Part.	Skater	Country	Discipline	Years (Note: In 2020 and 2021 the Fantasy on Ice tour was not held due to the COVID-19 pandemic.)
15	Stéphane Lambiel	Switzerland	Men's singles	2010–2026
13	Nobunari Oda	Japan	Men's singles	2012–2026
12	Johnny Weir	United States	Men's singles	2010–2023
12	Yuzuru Hanyu	Japan	Men's singles	2010–2015, 2017–2024 (Note: Hanyu was scheduled for the 2016 Fantasy on Ice, but could not attend the tour due to rehabilitation from a ligament injury.)
10	Miki Ando	Japan	Women's singles	2010–2019
10	Akiko Suzuki	Japan	Women's singles	2010–2019
10	Javier Fernández	Spain	Men's singles	2013–2024
9	Shizuka Arakawa	Japan	Women's singles	2010–2013, 2016–2017, 2019–2023 (Note: Arakawa was scheduled for the 2014 Fantasy on Ice, but missed the tour due to pregnancy.)
8	Philippe Candeloro	France	Men's singles	2011–2016, 2018–2019
8	Satoko Miyahara	Japan	Women's singles	2016, 2018–2026
8	Kaori Sakamoto	Japan	Women's singles	2017–2026
7	Anna Cappellini	Italy	Ice dance	2014–2022
7	Luca Lanotte	Italy	Ice dance	2014–2022
6	Jeffrey Buttle	Canada	Men's singles	2015–2022
6	Deniss Vasiljevs	Latvia	Men's singles	2017–2024
6	Mai Mihara	Japan	Women's singles	2017–2024

=== Guest skaters ===
The following figure skaters and ice acrobats have been invited to Fantasy on Ice since its first edition in 2010:

==== Men's singles ====
- (Japan) Tatsuki Machida (2010–2014)
- (Ukraine) Viktor Petrenko (2010)
- (Russia) Evgeni Plushenko (2010, 2015, 2017–2019)
- (Czech Republic) Tomáš Verner (2010–2011, 2015–2016)
- (United States) Jeremy Abbott (2011)
- (Russia) Artur Gachinski (2011–2012)
- (France) Brian Joubert (2011–2013, 2015–2016)
- (Japan) Kensuke Nakaniwa (2011)
- (Japan) Yasuharu Nanri (2011)
- (Japan) Daisuke Takahashi (2011, 2014)
- (Japan) Tomoyuki Koriyama (2013)
- (Canada) Nam Nguyen (2013–2015)
- (Japan) Akio Sasaki (2013)
- (Japan) Shoma Uno (2015–2017)
- (Russia) Ilia Kulik (2016)
- (Canada) Elladj Baldé (2017–2022)
- (Uzbekistan) Misha Ge (2018)
- (Japan) Takahito Mura (2018, 2023)
- (United States) Jason Brown (2022)
- (Japan) Kao Miura (2022)
- (Japan) Keiji Tanaka (2022–2026)
- (Japan) Kazuki Tomono (2023–2026)
- (Japan) Sota Yamamoto (2023–2024)
- (South Korea) Cha Jun-hwan (2024-2026)
- (Japan) Rio Nakata (2024-2026)
- (France) Adam Siao Him Fa (2024)
- (Japan) Shun Sato (2026)

==== Women's singles ====
- (France) Surya Bonaly (2010)
- (Japan) Haruka Imai (2010–2011, 2013–2014)
- (Japan) Kanako Murakami (2010–2014)
- (Japan) Fumie Suguri (2010–2011)
- (Japan) Junko Yaginuma (2010)
- (Japan) Yuka Sato (2011)
- (Russia) Elizaveta Tuktamysheva (2011, 2019)
- (Japan) Wakaba Higuchi (2015–2016) (Note: Higuchi was scheduled for the 2022 Fantasy on Ice, but could not attend the tour due to injury.)
- (Japan) Marin Honda (2015–2017)
- (Japan) Yuka Nagai (2015)
- (Japan) Yuna Aoki (2015–2016, 2024-2026)
- (Japan) Rika Kihira (2017–2019)
- (Italy) Carolina Kostner (2017–2018) (Note: Kostner was scheduled for the 2019 Fantasy on Ice, but could not attend the tour due to worsening hip pain.)
- (Russia) Evgenia Medvedeva (2017–2019)
- (Russia) Anna Pogorilaya (2017–2018)
- (Russia) Alina Zagitova (2019, 2025)
- (Japan) Mana Kawabe (2022)
- (Japan) Rino Matsuike (2022)
- (Japan) Rena Uezono (2024)
- (Russia) Anna Shcherbakova (2025)
- (Japan) Ami Nakai (2026)

==== Pairs ====
- (Russia) Tatiana Volosozhar / Maxim Trankov (2011, 2014–2016, 2019)
- (Canada) Meagan Duhamel / Eric Radford (2015)
- (Russia) Ksenia Stolbova / Fedor Klimov (2016)
- (Germany) Aljona Savchenko / Bruno Massot (2018)

==== Ice dance ====
- (France) Nathalie Péchalat / Fabian Bourzat (2010–2011, 2014)
- (France) Marina Anissina / Gwendal Peizerat (2012)
- (United States) Meryl Davis / Charlie White (2016)
- (France) Gabriella Papadakis / Guillaume Cizeron (2017, 2022–2024)
- (Canada) Tessa Virtue / Scott Moir (2018–2019)
- (United Kingdom) Lilah Fear / Lewis Gibson (2023–2024)
- (Canada) Piper Gilles / Paul Poirier (2023–2024)
- (France) Laurence Fournier Beaudry / Guillaume Cizeron (2025-2026)
- (Japan) Ikura Kushida / Koshiro Shimada (2026)

==== Ice acrobats ====
- Oleksiy Polishchuk / Vladimir Besedin (2010–2014, 2016–2022) (Note: At the 2010 Fantasy on Ice in Niigata, Oleksiy Polishchuk performed with Robert Coding.)
- Violetta Afanasieva / Pete Dack (2011–2012)
- Gev Manoukian (2012, 2014–2015)
- Sergei Yakimenko (2014–2015)
- Irina Usenko (2015)
- Valérie Inertie (2016)

==== Aerialists ====
- Ekaterina Chesna / Alexander Chesna (2010–2013, 2015)
- Elena Shevchenko / Dominic Esposito (2014, 2016–2018)
- Airy Japan (2014, 2023)
- Marie-Pierre Leray (2016–2017)
- Mery Acevedo / Alfonso Campa (2019–2024)
- Blue Tokyo (2023)

== Notes and references ==
=== Books and magazines cited ===
- Aera (June 6, 2022). 羽生結弦「96日ぶり情熱の滑り」 [Yuzuru Hanyu: Skating with passion for the first time in 96 days]. Aera (in Japanese). Vol. 27. Kita-ku, Osaka: Asahi Shimbun Publishing. ch. 3. JAN 4910210120626.
- Fantasy on Ice (June 21, 2022a). 公式プログラム（幕張公演）『Fantasy on Ice 2022』 [Official Program (Makuhari Performance) "Fantasy on Ice 2022"] (in Japanese). Chiyoda, Tokyo: Tenprint Co., Ltd.
- FS Life (September 14, 2018). "Ice Show in Japan 2018". Figure Skate Life (in Japanese). Minato, Tokyo: Fusosha Publishing. ch. 1. ISBN 978-4-594-61326-6.
- FS Life (June 21, 2023). 華麗なるスケート衣装の世界IV [The world of splendid skating costumes IV]. Figure Skate Life Extra (in Japanese). Minato, Tokyo: Fusosha Publishing. ch. 4. ISBN 978-4-594-62059-2.
- Hamilton, Francis F. (January 1, 1974). Ice Capades: "years of entertainment". Washington D.C.: Penchant Publishing Co., Ltd. OCLC 1217567.
- Kiss & Cry (June 20, 2019). TVガイド特別編集 KISS & CRY [TV Guide Special Edition KISS & CRY]. Kiss & Cry (in Japanese). Vol. 28. Chūō, Tokyo: Tokyo News Agency. ch. 2–3. ISBN 978-4-86336-934-4.
- Makabe, Kikuo (February 1, 2021). 志 ～アイスショーに賭ける夢～ [Aspiration – Dream to bet on an ice show] (in Japanese). Bunkyo, Tokyo: Shinshokan. ISBN 978-4-403-23127-8.
- Noto, Sunao; Taguchi, Yukihito; Tanaka, Nobuaki (June 9, 2019). ファンタジー・オン・アイス2019 オフィシャルフォトブック [Fantasy on Ice 2019 Official Photo Book] (in Japanese). Chiyoda, Tokyo: Shueisha. ISBN 978-4-08-780874-2.
- World FS (December 6, 2001). フィリップ・キャンデロロジャパンツアー2001 熱意が生んだ感動 [Philippe Candelolo Japan Tour 2001 – Excitement born of enthusiasm]. World Figure Skating (in Japanese). Vol. 6. Bunkyo, Tokyo: Shinshokan. ch. 1. ISBN 978-4-403-31018-8.
- World FS (December 25, 2003). フィリップ・キャンデロロ ファンタジー・オン・アイス [Philippe Candeloro Fantasy on Ice]. World Figure Skating (in Japanese). Vol. 12. Bunkyo, Tokyo: Shinshokan. ch. 5. ISBN 978-4-403-31028-7.
- World FS (December 4, 2006). チャンピオンズ・オン・アイス2006 [Champions on Ice 2006]. World Figure Skating (in Japanese). Vol. 25. Bunkyo, Tokyo: Shinshokan. ch. 4. ISBN 978-4-403-31028-7.
- World FS (August 28, 2010a). ファンタジー・オン・アイス2010 [Fantasy on Ice 2010]. World Figure Skating (in Japanese). Vol. 44. Bunkyo, Tokyo: Shinshokan. ch. 1. ISBN 978-4-403-31062-1.
- World FS (November 20, 2010b). ファンタジー･オン･アイス福井公演 [Fantasy on Ice in Fukui]. World Figure Skating (in Japanese). Vol. 45. Bunkyo, Tokyo: Shinshokan. ch. 5. ISBN 978-4-403-31063-8.
