= Fernando Egozcue =

Argentine guitarist and composer

- Born: June 23, 1959; Buenos Aires, Argentina
- Occupations: Composer, guitarist
- Instrument: Guitar
- Member of: Fernando Egozcue Quintet
- Website: www.fernandoegozcue.com

Fernando Egozcue (born June 23, 1959) is an Argentinian guitarist and composer.

== Biography ==
Fernando Pablo Egozcue Folgueras was born in Buenos Aires, Argentina, on June 23, 1959. Son of Carlos María Egozcue and Beatriz Folgueras, a lawyer and French teacher respectively, he briefly started his studies on guitar; with just 5 years assists to the lessons of the teacher Blanca de Solari, in this neighborhood of Nuñez, under her mother's keep eye, mainstay on his education. During these first years he combined music and school until, at the age of 13, he and his friends in Nuñez starts to discover improvising, spending the afternoons of his early adolescence creating musical atmospheres in a group.

At the age of 12 he started a medium degree in music at the Music Municipal Conservatory of Buenos Aires, where he studied Harmony with the well-known Argentinean composer Carlos Guastavino. He finished his studies in 1979, graduating with the title of National Teacher of Music, specialty in Guitar, under the professorship of Horacio Ceballos.

Over two consecutive years, 1978 and 1979, he obtained the prestigious scholarship of the Government of Brazil to participate in the X and XI International Guitar Seminar in the city of Porto Alegre, where he had the opportunity to study Guitar with Abel Carlevaro, Álvaro Pierri, Miguel Ángel Girolet and Contemporary Music with the composer Francis Schwartz.

During his adolescence, he studied composition with Luis María Corallini and Guitar with Nelly Menotti. Later on he learned Counterpoint and Composition with Guillermo Graetzer, disciple of Paul Hindemith as well as Jazz with Greg Hopking, teacher of the Berklee College of Music, in Buenos Aires. In 1983, he made his recording debut with his own composition, "Música de la ciudad de Buenos Aires" (Music of the city of Buenos Aires).

In 1992 he moved to Spain, where he lives currently. There he continued his musical studies, obtaining in 1996 the Superior Title of Guitar in the Music Superior Conservatory of San Lorenzo del Escorial (Madrid).

Egozcue's work includes compositions for solo guitar as well as for quartet, quintet and septet groups mainly. He has also composed for big orchestras; for example, his piece "Concert for guitar and string orchestra" interpreted by the Chamber Orchestra Andrés Segovia under the direction of José Luis Novo, first performed in 2003 in the National Auditory of Music of Madrid. On 21 June 2011, an ambitious project was first played by the Asturias Symphony Orchestra at the Príncipe Felipe Congress Hall-Auditorium in Oviedo, with Egozcue himself on the guitar, the "bandoneonista" Omar Massa, the tenor José Manuel Zapata and the "cantaora flamenca" Rocío Márquez, under the direction of Joan Albert Amargós: the orchestration of his own traditional tango arrangements as well as other compositions.

In addition to his activity as a composer from 1997 to 2003 he was a music teacher and director of the Music Municipal School of Coslada (Madrid). He has also been panel judge in the XVIII Contest on Spanish Dance Choreography and Flamenco celebrated at the Canal Theatre of Madrid in 2009.

In 1979 he was awarded first prize in the Guitar National Contest of San Lorenzo in Argentina. He was also elected finalist at the XII Music Awards in 2008, granted by the Spanish Music Academy, in the category of "Best Player of Classical Music" with the violinist Ara Malikian for their record Lejos. In 2010 he was finalist at the XIII Max Awards of the Scenic Arts, granted by the Spanish General Society of Authors and Editors (Sociedad General de Autores y Editores – SGAE-) and the Author Foundation (Fundación Autor), in the category of "Best music composition for scenic performance" for his original score, for the performance Jazzing Flamenco.

Egozcue mainly performs live concerts of his own compositions. In Spain he has played in the Liceo Theatre of Barcelona, the Palau de las Artes of Valencia, Albeniz Theatre of Madrid, Royal Theatre of Madrid, National Auditory of Music of Madrid, Patio de Conde Duque of Madrid (under the cycles "Summers of Villa") and Debod Temple. Abroad, he has showcased his music on five continents, taking part in the Wexford Festival Opera (Ireland), Columbia Festival in Maryland (United States), Quebec Summer Festival (United States), Is Sanat Festival en Istanbul (Turkey), International Jazz Festival of Montreal (Canada), National Arts Centre in Ottawa (Canada), Memorial Auditorium at Stanford University in California (United States), Opernhaus Düsseldorf (Germany) and Al Bustan Festival in Beirut (Lebanon).

== Groups ==
He started his career as a performer in 1979, creating the duo Moldavsky-Egozcue with the guitarist Sergio Moldavsky, playing countless concerts around his native Argentina. Alongside he created the group Nuevos Aires in which he was the composer and guitarist until 1991.

In 1992 he moved to Spain, where he created one of his major projects, the septet Ensemble Nuevo Tango (ENT). It is in 1998 when he meets the violinist Ara Malikian and they start playing in ENT. This collaboration will end with the creation of the Ara Malikian / Fernando Egozcue Quintet, in which Egozcue is currently the composer and guitarist.

In 2011 he began a new musical project, including the bandoneon -typical instrument from Argentina- in his group, and recording as a Quintet the CD "Dale" with the Argentinian bandoneonist Matías Rubino, Miguel Rodrigáñez (double bass), Martin Bruhn (drums), and Juan Pérez de Albéniz (violoncelo).

He has made two records "Tango en silencio" (Tango in silence) and "Solo" (Alone), his last project as soloist until now. In the 80s he collaborated as a soloist with the chamber orchestra "Los Solistas de Buenos Aires" (The Soloist of Buenos Aires), directed by Arberto Epelbaum. In 1996 he was the soloist of the performance "Poemas de García Lorca" with the actress Carmen de la Maza.

Egozcue has been the arranger and musical director of the music of several performances in which his music is played live; among others, the performance of the Nuevo Ballet Español "Alma" or "Mano a mano" with the tenor José Manuel Zapata and the singer Pasión Vega, first performed in the Royal Theatre of Madrid. The record of this latter performance was edited in 2010 under the name "Tango y Lágrimas" and with the contribution of the "cantaores" Miguel Poveda y José Mercé.

In addition, in 2009 he was the arranger of the Suite Iberia of Isaac Albéniz, for group of chamber. This was for the dance piece "Subiendo al Sur/Albéniz" by the Dance Company Ibérica de Danza, directed by Manuel Segovia (Dance National Award of 2001) and choreographed by Carlos Chamorro. He was also the arranger and musical director of the performance "Tango y Lágrimas", with the tenor José Manuel Zapata, the "cantaor flamenco" José Mercé and the singer Marta Sánchez, first played in November in the Liceo Theatre of Barcelona.

== Discography ==
Currently, he has 14 edited records as a composer and guitarist:

With the group Nuevos Aires:

- Música de la ciudad de Nuevos Aires (1983)
- Nuevos Aires (1989)
- De este lado del mundo (1991)

As soloist:

- Tango en silencio (1997)
- Solo (2006)
- Solo tango (2006)

With the Ensamble Nuevo Tango:

- 500 Motivaciones (2001)
- Tango directo (2003)

With Fernando Egozcue / Ara Malikian Quintet:

- Lejos (2007)
- Con los ojos cerrados... (2011)

With Fernando Egozcue Quintet:

- Dale (2012)

With Fernando Egozcue / José Luis Montón:

- Lo nuestro (2015)

With Fernando Egozcue / Alberto San Juan:

- España ingobernable (2018)

With Fernando Egozcue Trío:

- La vida va (2015)

Original soundtracks:

He has composed the cinematic soundtrack of the movie The Lost Steps of Manane Rodríguez (2001) and has also contributed as guitarist in the recording of the soundtracks of the following movies: Eduardo Mignona's Flop (1990) with the tango singer Adriana Varela, Pedro Almodóvar's All about my mother (1999), José Luis Cuerda's Butterfly Tongues (1999) and Miguel Albaladejo's Manolito Gafotas (1999), among others.

He has also composed the music of the following theatrical performances: Pavlovsky with Nuevos Aires, Ángel Pavlovsky (1986); Life and death of Pier Paolo Pasolini, Michel Azama, directed by Roberto Cerdá (2003); No Man’s land, Danis Tanovic, directed by Roberto Cerdá (2004); Lágrimas de cera, Roberto Cerdá (2004) and Pared, Itziar Pascual, directed by Roberto Cerdá (2006). In addition, Egozcue is the composer of the music of several dance performances, where his groups play live. This is the case with "Tango Flamenco" by Dance Company Antonio Najarro, current Director of the Spanish National Ballet whose music was interpreted by the Ensamble Nuevo Tango. Also, the performance "Jazzing Flamenco" of the same company, whose music is today interpreted by the Fernando Egozcue Quintet.

Regarding his works as composer, it is worth mentioning the creation of the music for the performance of the following resident dance companies of the Community of Madrid: María Pagés, Ibérica de Danza, Antonio Márquez, Nuevo Ballet Español and Larumbe Danza. It was performed in the presentation of the theatric season of the Community of Madrid in the Nuevo Alcalá Theatre. Lastly, his music has also been used elsewhere. His composition Lejos was choreographed by the Dance Company Larumbe-Danza for the dance piece "Azul" and by the Dance Company La Truco for the dance piece "Remembranzas"; the same dance piece also used the composition Tango en silencio. On a different note, his successful composition Viejos Aires was choreographed in the Spanish TV series Un Paso Adelante, and by the dancer Rafael Amargo at the Innocents’ Ceremony on the Spanish TV channel Telecinco and for his dance piece "A tres bandas"; Viejos Aires has also been used by the United States Figure Skating Champion 2009 and 2010, Jeremy Abbott, for his exhibitions and contests. Likewise with Carne Cruda, this was choreographed in 2007 by World Figure Skating Champion in 2005 and 2006 Stephane Lambiel. In 2009 his composition Agua y Vino was first performed in the National Auditory of Music of Madrid by the violinist Ara Malikian and the pianist Daniel del Pino; this composition is included in the record Minds of these two artists. In 2010 his compositions Viejos Aires and Brasil Sacrificado have been choreographed by the Dance Company Carmen Mota. And the Spanish gymnast Carolina Rodríguez used the composition "Lejos" for her final competition at rhythmic gymnastics at London Olympics 2012.
