= Noémie Silberer =

Swiss figure skater

Figure skating career
- Country: Switzerland
- Discipline: Women's singles
- Coach: Peter Grütter

Medal record
Swiss Championships
Bronze medal – third place	2008 Winterthur	Singles
Bronze medal – third place	2009 La Chaux-de-Fonds	Singles

Noémie Silberer (born 8 January 1991 in Geneva, Switzerland) is a retired Swiss figure skater who competed in ladies singles. Silberer began skating at age 5. She would go on to become the 2005 Swiss national junior champion, and won the bronze medal at the 2007 Trophée Métropole Nice Côte d'Azur. The following year, she won the bronze medal at the Swiss Figure Skating Championships in 2008 and 2009. In 2009, she was selected to replace Sarah Meier at the European Figure Skating Championships in Helsinki. She would place 28th in the competition. She was coached by Peter Grütter.

Sliberer was plagued by injuries throughout her skating career. In 2009 she had to take time away from skating due to hip injuries, causing her to miss the 2009 World Figure Skating Championships. In 2010 at age 19, she was forced to retire from the sport due to serious back problems from periostitis, which prevented her from training at an international level. After her retirement from competitive ice skating, she returned to the ice as an ice dancer and cabaret performer.
