= Valeriya Ezhova =

Belarusian-Swiss figure skater (born 2010)

Personal information
- Native name: Валерия Ежова
- Born: 16 February 2010 (age 16) Moscow, Russia
- Home town: Champéry, Switzerland
- Height: 160 cm (5 ft 3 in)

Figure skating career
- Country: Switzerland (since 2025); Belarus (until 2024)
- Coach: Stéphane Lambiel
- Skating club: CP Champéry
- Began skating: 2016

Medal record
Representing Belarus
Belarusian Championships
| Silver medal – second place | 2023 Minsk | Singles |
| Silver medal – second place | 2024 Minsk | Singles |

Valeriya Ezhova (Russian: Валерия Ежова, Belarusian: Валерыя Яжова; born 16 February 2010) is a Russian-born Belarusian-Swiss figure skater. Skating for Belarus she is a two-time junior national champion and a two-time silver senior national medalist.

Ezhova represented Belarus until 2024, before switching representation to Switzerland in 2025.

== Personal life ==
Valeriya Ezhova was born on 16 February 2010 in Moscow, Russia. She was a Belarusian citizen and represented the country before moving to Switzerland in April 2024 due to her parents work commitments.

She can communicate in Russian, French and English. Additionally, she is learning German at school.

== Career ==
=== Early career ===
Ezhova began skating in 2016. In Moscow, she was coached by Oksana Matveeva and credits her for her solid basics. She skated domestically for Russia on the advanced novice level. She did not make any international appearances.

=== Skating for Belarus ===
==== 2022–2023 season ====
Ezhova competed at the 2023 Belarusian Championships on both the senior and junior level; winning silver at the senior competition behind Viktoriia Safonova, and gold on the junior level.

==== 2023–2024 season ====
Ezhova won silver for a second consecutive time at the senior 2024 Belarusian Championships. She later defended her junior title, winning gold.

==== 2024–2025 season: Hiatus, relocation to Switzerland ====
In April 2024, it was announced that Belarusian skater Ezhova had relocated to Switzerland due to her parents work commitments. Initially moving to Switzerland solely with her mother, her father, brother and family dog shortly followed. The family was situated beside the ice rink, however Valeriya was unable to immediately begin training due to a stress fracture that required healing.“Honestly, these three months were among the hardest in my life,” the athlete said. “The mental pressure amplified the physical pain from the injury as I had just one wish: to return to the ice.”

Ezhova expressed struggle during her relocation from Moscow to Champéry, including learning the French language. “I had never studied it before my arrival, so I had to learn it practically from scratch...it is impossible to follow classes in the Swiss school." She later completed her final French exams.

Ezhova later began training with the 2006 Olympic silver medalist, Stéphane Lambiel.

=== Skating for Switzerland ===
==== 2025–2026 season: International debut ====
Ezhova debuted internationally for Switzerland at the 2025 Junior Grand Prix in Thailand finishing in seventh place. The following month, she won silver at the Cup of Nice, as well as gold at the Swiss Open. Ezhova subsequently placed fifth at the 2025 Tallinn Trophy.

In December, Ezhova debuted at the Swiss junior national championships. She won the gold medal in front of Elisabeth Dibbern. Ezhova shared following her performance at nationals, “I think in this moment I really felt the responsibility to represent Switzerland at the Junior World Championships. Therefore, winning this competition was one of the most emotional moments of the season for me.”

The following month, she won gold at the 2026 Baravian Open.

In March, Ezhova made her first appearance at the Junior World Championships in Tallinn, Estonia. She garnered new personal best scores across both program segments, thus overall. “I think it was a successful season,” said Valeriya. “At Junior Worlds, I put out a good performance. For sure, I'm aiming at better results at the World level, this is one of my main goals for the next season.”

==== 2026–2027 season ====
Ezhova opened the new season on the Junior Grand Prix, competing in stages in both Latvia and Georgia. She placed sixth and seventh respectively.

== Programs ==
| Season | Short program | Free skating | Exhibition |
|---|---|---|---|
| 2026–27 | Interlude; Fortes by Camille Lellouche; Concerto de España by Roni Benise choreo. Stéphane Lambiel | Sun Rising on the Flagstone; The Ellen and Brian Theme; We Two Might Be One; Leave a Mark (from "Outlander: Blood of My Blood") by Bear McCreary choreo. by Stéphane Lambiel | |
| 2025–26 | Maison by Emilio Piano and Lucie choreo. by Stéphane Lambiel | Sun Rising on the Flagstone; The Ellen and Brian Theme; We Two Might Be One; Leave a Mark (from "Outlander: Blood of My Blood") by Bear McCreary choreo. by Stéphane Lambiel | |
| 2024–25 | Did not compete this season | | |
| 2023–24 | Queen's Gambit (soundtrack) | Piano Sonata No. 14 in C Sharp Minor, Op. 27 No. 2 'Moonlight' composed by Maria João Pires; Moonlight Sonata Mvt.3 by Tommee Profitt; Requiem: VII. Libera me (Excerpt) by Robert Shaw, Atlanta Symphony Orchestra and Susan Dunn | |

== Competitive highlights ==
- JGP – Event of the ISU Grand Prix Series
- TBD – Assigned

=== Skating for Switzerland ===
Competition placements at junior level
| Season | 2025–26 | 2026–27 |
|---|---|---|
| World Junior Championships | 8th | |
| Swiss Championships | 1st | |
| JGP Thailand | 7th | |
| JGP Latvia | | 6th |
| JGP Georgia | | 7th |
| Cup of Nice | 2nd | |
| Swiss Open | 1st | |
| Tallinn Trophy | 5th | |
| Bavarian Open | 1st | |

=== Skating for Belarus ===
Competition placements at senior level
| Season | 2022–23 | 2023–24 |
|---|---|---|
| Belarusian Championships | 2nd | 2nd |

Competition placements at junior level
| Season | 2022–23 | 2023–24 |
|---|---|---|
| Belarusian Championships | 1st | 1st |
