= Tomotaka Okamoto (singer) =

- Also known as: Okamoto Tomotaka 岡本 知高
- Born: 3 December 1976 (age 49)
- Origin: Sukumo city, Kochi prefecture, Japan
- Genres: Classical
- Occupation: Singer
- Instrument: Vocals
- Website: sopranista-okamoto.com

Tomotaka Okamoto (岡本 知高, Okamoto Tomotaka; born December 3, 1976) is a Japanese sopranist.

== Career ==
Tomotaka Okamoto was born December 3, 1976, in Sukumo, Japan, and graduated from the Kunitachi College of Music. He also graduated from the Conservatoire Francis Poulenc with a first place award. His debut album Sopranista charted for 17 weeks on the Oricon Albums Chart, peaking at number 100. He makes frequent guest appearances on national television.

In 2015, Okamoto was invited to the annual touring ice show Fantasy on Ice in Kanazawa and Shizuoka. He performed live in collaboration with different figure skaters to the aria "Nessun dorma", the hymn "Amazing Grace" and "Time to say goodbye" in a duet with singer Sarah Àlainn amongst others. At the closing ceremony of the 2020 Summer Olympics, Okamoto gave a committed and dramatic solo rendition of the Olympic hymn.

== Style ==
He is a “sopranista”, a male who has a female soprano vocal range voice. He often dresses in a unique manner when he performs. His repertory is various; he sings castrato (Farinelli) compositions not only in opera, but also Japanese classics, crossover favorites, and pop ballads. He collaborates with Japanese orchestras and artists and also overseas orchestras, such as the Moscow Philharmonic Symphony, the English Chamber Orchestra and the Royal Philharmonic Orchestra in London, such as the Prague Chamber Orchestra. He has also given solo concerts with piano accompaniment in various parts of Japan.
