= Peter Grütter =

Swiss figure skater and coach

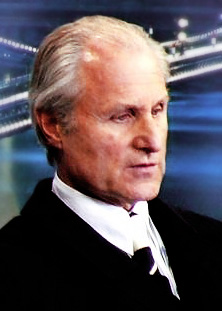
- Grütter at the 2004 European Figure Skating Championships

Personal information
- Born: 30 June 1942 (age 84) Bern, Switzerland

Figure skating career
- Country: Switzerland
- Skating club: Club de Patinoire de Geneve

Peter Grütter (born 30 June 1942) is a Swiss former competitive figure skater who currently works as a coach.

== Biography ==
Grütter was born in Bern. He competed for Switzerland at the 1964 Winter Olympics, placing 24th. He retired from competitive skating following that season. As a skater, Grütter was coached by Jacques Gerschwiler.

Grütter began coaching in 1965. His most notable student has been Stéphane Lambiel, whom he coached from 1995 until June 2008 and again from July 2009. He coached Lambiel to win two World Championships, as well as an Olympic Silver Medal and other titles. Others among his current and former students include Noémie Silberer, Kristel Popovic, Raphaël Bohren, Samuel Contesti, Laurent Alvarez, Paolo Bacchini, Alisson Perticheto and Anna Ovcharova.
