= Fumiya Sashida =

Japanese singer-songwriter (born 1986)

- Born: 18 August 1986 (age 39); Tokyo, Japan
- Genres: J-pop; rock; funk
- Occupation: Singer-songwriter
- Instruments: Singing; piano
- Years active: 2011–
- Label: Warner Music Japan
- Website: Official website

Fumiya Sashida (指田 郁也, 指田 フミヤ, Sashida Fumiya; born 18 August 1986, in Tokyo, Japan) is a Japanese singer-songwriter. He is represented with Stardust Promotion and his record label is Warner Music Japan.

== Biography ==
Sashida was born in Tokyo. He started playing the piano at the age of three, and he continued to play until he graduated from junior high school. Later on Sashida aimed to become a professional during his first year at high school, and started going to voice training.

In 2010 he applied to Warner Music Japan's Voice Power Audition: 100-nen Vocalist o Sagase and won the Grand Prix. Sashida later started his major debut with the single "bird / Yūyake Kōzokudōro" in 12 October 2011.

In 2012, Sashida made an appearance as a guest artist at the annual touring ice show Fantasy on Ice, where he performed live with figure skater and two-time Olympic champion, Yuzuru Hanyu, to the song "Hana ni nare" (lit. "Be a flower").

== Discography ==
=== Single ===
	Year	Title	Remarks
1st	2011	"bird / Yūyake Kōzokudōro"	Oricon No. 180
2nd	2012	"Parallel="	Not in the Oricon charts
3rd	2012	"Hana ni nare"	Oricon #99; Appeared three times
4th	2013	"Ballad"	Oricon No. 90
5th	2014	"hello-EP"	Digest; Oricon No. 95

=== Albums ===
	Year	Title	Remarks
1st	2013	Shiro kuro	Digest; Oricon No. 121

== Music videos ==
Director	Song
Kosei Imai	"bird"
Takuro Okubo	"Parallel="
Kensaku Kakimoto	"Hana ni nare"
Kosuke Sadamatsu	"Ballad"
Fujimura Totsuka	"hello"

=== Tie-ups ===
Song	Tie-up	Ref.
"Yūyake Kōzokudōro"	Chikyū no Saisentan o Scoop! Scooper ending theme	
"Parallel"	Bakuman 2nd Series ending theme	
"Hana ni nare"	Hidamari no Ki theme song	
"Ballad"	Naru yō ni naru sa. theme song	
"music"	Shogakukan CanCam December 2013 issue advert song	
"music"	ABC Banpaku Marathon 2014 theme song	
"Orange"	Sono Hi no mae ni theme song	
"hello"	Naru yō ni naru sa. 2nd Series theme song	

=== Live tours ===
Year	Title	Ref.
2012	Fumiya Sashida Hikigatari Live: Honne 2012	
2013	Fumiya Sashida Hikigatari Live Honne 2013: Haru no Jin	
2014	Fumiya Sashida "Shiro kuro" shikuyoro Tour 2014	

== Filmography ==
=== TV series ===
Year	Title	Network	Notes	Ref.
2012	Tamori Club	TV Asahi	Guest appearance	

=== Radio ===
Year	Title	Network	Notes	Ref.
2011	Fumiya Sashida no All Aboard!!	Zip-FM	Personality	
