= Antonio Najarro =

Spanish dancer and choreographer (born 1975)

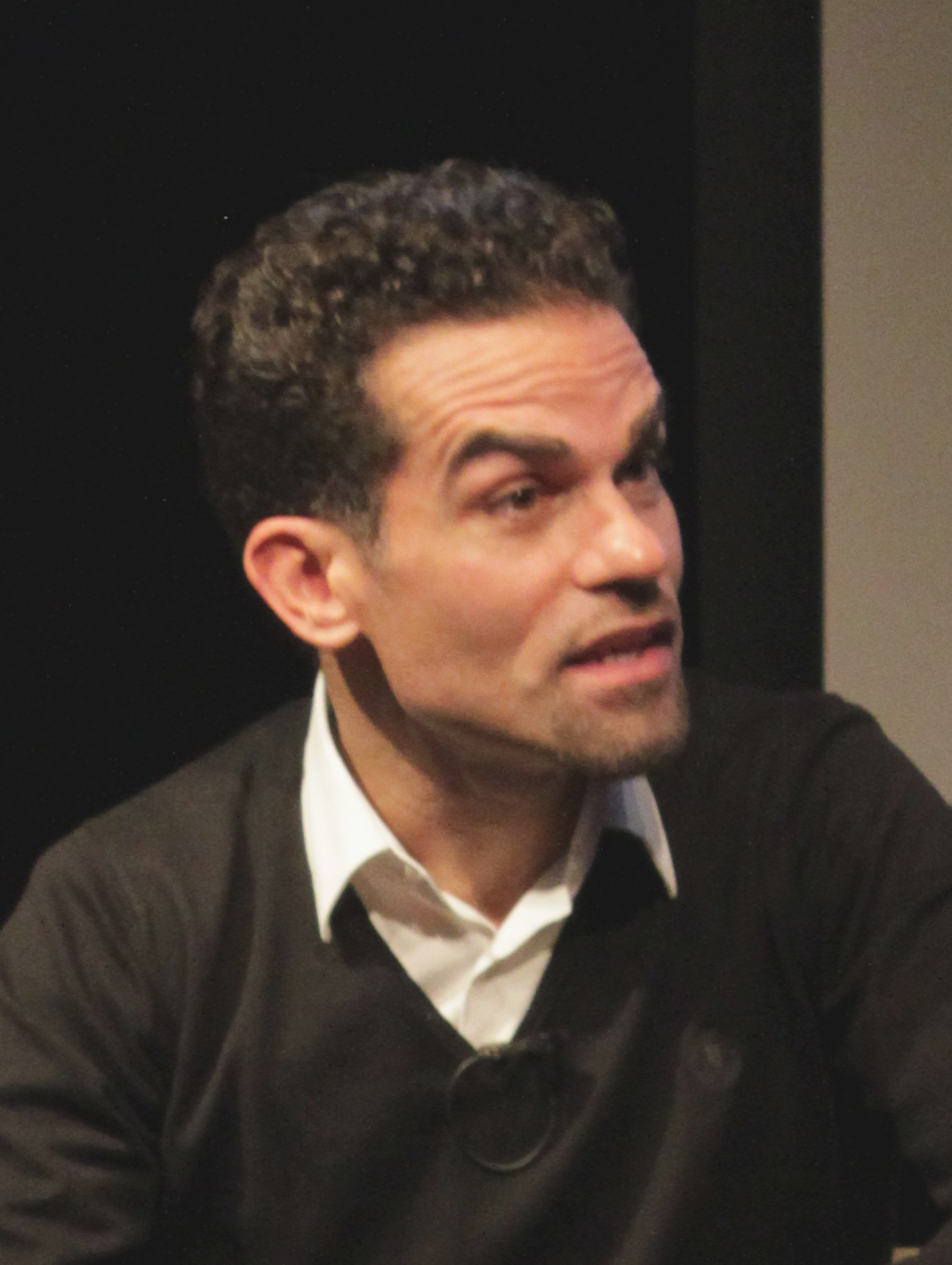
- Born: Antonio Rodríguez Najarro; 22 November 1975 (age 50); Madrid, Spain
- Education: Real Conservatorio Profesional de Danza
- Occupations: ballet dancer, flamenco dancer, figure-skating choreographer
- Website: antonionajarro.com

Antonio Najarro (born 22 November 1975 in Madrid, Spain) is a Spanish dancer of ballet and flamenco, as well as a figure-skating choreographer.

== Career ==
=== Flamenco dancer ===
At age 15, Najarro began his career, getting a Distinction in Spanish Dance in the Real Conservatorio Profesional de Danza in Madrid, working in the Ballet Teatro Español de Rafael Aguilar company, where he gained soloist roles portraying characters, including Lucas El Torero in its production of Carmen, which travelled throughout Europe. He then worked in companies including Ballet Antología, José Antonio y los Ballets Españoles, Compañía Antonio Márquez, and Compañía Aída Gómez.

He later started working as a principal dancer with Rafael Aguilar, Antonio Gades, and other artists. He also took part in the Ballet Nacional de España.

As a choreographer, his works are part of the repertoire of dance institutions of Spain, including the Real Conservatorio de Danza de Madrid, the Ballet Nacional de España, and the José Antonio y los Ballets Españoles company.

In 2002, he created the company Antonio Najarro, with which he has been presenting shows worldwide, including Tango Flamenco, Flamencoriental, and Jazzing Flamenco.

=== Figure-skating choreographer ===
As a figure-skating choreographer, his clients include:

- Jeremy Abbott
- Marina Anissina and Gwendal Peizerat
- Pernelle Carron and Lloyd Jones
- Brian Joubert
- Stéphane Lambiel
- Nathalie Péchalat and Fabian Bourzat
- Kaitlyn Weaver and Andrew Poje
- Javier Fernandez
- Sara Hurtado and Kirill Khaliavin
- Sara Hurtado and Adrián Díaz

He has also been a choreographer of various ice shows, including Art on Ice, Dreams on Ice, Fantasy on Ice and Champions on Ice in France, Japan, Russia, Switzerland, and the United States.

== Awards ==
Among others, he has received the following individual recognition:

- First prize for choreography at the Eighth Choreographic Contest of Spanish Dance and Flamenco de Madrid
- First Prize for Choreography at the First International Dance Competition, Teatro Central in Seville
- Prize for best young choreographer Harlequin 2009
- MAX Award for Outstanding Performance Arts Dance Men

With his choreography, skaters have won:

- 2002 Olympic gold medal in ice dancing, won by Marina Anissina and Gwendal Peizerat. Najarro choreographed their "Flamenco" original dance.
- 2007 World bronze medal, Grand Prix Final gold medal and 2008 European silver medal, won by Swiss Stéphane Lambiel. Najarro choreographed "Poet" and "Otoño Porteño".
