= Paolo Bacchini =

Italian figure skater (born 1985)

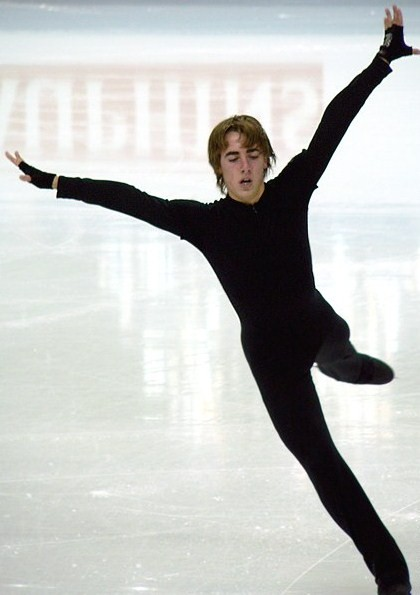
- Bacchini in 2005

Personal information
- Born: 16 August 1985 (age 41) Milan, Italy
- Height: 1.70 m (5 ft 7 in)

Figure skating career
- Country: Italy
- Coach: Peter Grütter
- Skating club: Gruppo Sportivo Fiamme Oro
- Began skating: 1994

Medal record
Italian Championships
Silver medal – second place	2003 Lecco	Singles
Silver medal – second place	2004 Milan	Singles
Silver medal – second place	2005 Merano	Singles
Silver medal – second place	2006 Sesto San Giovanni	Singles
Silver medal – second place	2009 Pinerolo	Singles
Silver medal – second place	2010 Brescia	Singles
Silver medal – second place	2011 Milan	Singles
Silver medal – second place	2012 Courmayeur	Singles
Silver medal – second place	2013 Milan	Singles
Bronze medal – third place	2002 Collalbo	Singles
Bronze medal – third place	2007 Trento	Singles
Bronze medal – third place	2008 Milan	Singles
Bronze medal – third place	2014 Merano	Singles

Paolo Bacchini (born 16 August 1985) is an Italian former competitive figure skater. He is the 2007 and 2012 Merano Cup champion, 2008 Triglav Trophy champion, and a twelve-time Italian national medalist (2002–2013).

Bacchini represented Italy at the 2010 Winter Olympics where he placed 20th in the men's event. In 2011, Bacchini joined Fiamme Oro, the sports category of the Italian police.

He is coached by Peter Grütter and his choreographers have included Raffaella Cazzaniga, Corrado Giordani, Salomé Brunner, and Stéphane Lambiel.

== Programs ==
Season	Short program	Free skating
2012–2013	Pinocchio (musical); La Strada by Nino Rota	Barber of Seville by Gioachino Rossini
2011–2012	Pinocchio (musical)	Barber of Seville by Gioachino Rossini
2010–2011	Pinocchio (musical)	Cirque du Soleil
2007–2008	Nothing Else Matters by Metallica performed by Apocalyptica	Passion of Christ by John Debney
2005–2006	Nothing Else Matters by Metallica	Romeo and Juliet
2004–2005	Shine On You Crazy Diamond by Pink Floyd	Pirates of the Caribbean by Klaus Badelt
2001–2002	Conan the Barbarian by Basil Poledouris	Prince Igor by Alexander Borodin

== Results ==
GP: Grand Prix; JGP: Junior Grand Prix

International
Event	01–02	02–03	03–04	04–05	05–06	06–07	07–08	08–09	09–10	10–11	11–12	12–13	13–14
Olympics									20th				
Worlds										21st		27th	
Europeans				25th			19th		16th	12th	16th	24th	
GP Skate Canada										12th			
Finlandia									9th	8th	9th		
Nebelhorn												13th	
Ondrej Nepela								2nd					
Challenge Cup								7th					
Crystal Skate												3rd	
Cup of Nice						7th		12th					
Golden Spin				5th			4th						
Merano Cup						2nd	1st	2nd	2nd	2nd	2nd	1st	3rd
NRW Trophy									7th				
Triglav Trophy					3rd		1st						
Universiade						10th		6th		7th			18th
International: Junior
Junior Worlds	21st			19th									
JGP Italy	11th												
JGP Mexico			6th										
JGP Netherlands	13th												
JGP Poland			11th										
JGP Romania				6th									
JGP Serbia		10th											
JGP Ukraine				8th									
Gardena		2nd											
EYOF		4th											
National
Italian Champ.	3rd	2nd	2nd	2nd	2nd	3rd	3rd	2nd	2nd	2nd	2nd	2nd	3rd
WD = Withdrew
