= Sarah Àlainn =

Japanese-Australian singer-songwriter (born 1986)

Sarah Àlainn サラ・オレイン
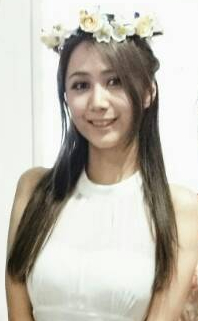
- Àlainn in 2015

Background information
- Instruments: Violin, Vocals, Piano, Kalimba, Looper, Synthesizer, Guitar,
- Years active: 2010–present
- Label: Universal Music
- Member of: La Diva

Sarah Àlainn is an Australian singer-songwriter. She is mostly active in Japan.

In 2010, her vocals were featured on the closing theme song "Beyond the Sky" (composed by Yasunori Mitsuda) for the Xenoblade video game on Wii. While studying at the University of Tokyo, she learned that composer Yasunori Mitsuda was looking for a singer with native-language English for a video game song, and she was hired by Mitsuda for the role. After returning to Australia, she learned that the song was very well received, and decided to become a singer. Àlainn returned to Japan with her family's permission (for only a year) only to begin her musical career. Near the end of the one-year period before she had to return to Australia, her demo CD went to Universal Music and they extended her a recording contract. Her father had recently died and she thinks the contract was his gift to her from beyond the grave.

Àlainn's second classical music album Sarah had originally charted at no. 13 in the Billboard Japan Top Classical Albums. In December 2014 it moved up to no. 1, after Japanese figure skater Yuzuru Hanyu had performed to the song "The Final Time Traveler" at the exhibition gala of the 2014–15 Grand Prix Final. Àlainn also presented the song with Hanyu as a live music collaboration at the 2014 edition of the touring ice show Fantasy on Ice.

In 2015, David Foster offers Sarah Àlainn to sing Colors of the Wind for the Japanese version of the album We Love Disney (2015 album).

In 2017, she plays the violin for Ludovico Einaudi's concert at the Sumida Triphony Hall.

Since 2018, she has been the co-host of Kabuki Kool (alongside Kataoka Ainosuke VI), a Japan Broadcasting Corporation (NHK) TV program used to introduce kabuki to foreign audiences.

== Multi-instrumentalist ==
Àlainn is known for playing various instruments in concert. While her main instruments are her voice and the violin (acoustic and electric), she also plays the piano and keyboards, the kalimba (using a custom instrument made from Japanese larch), and occasionally the guitar, the harpsichord or the pipe organ. She can also be seen performing with loopers (Roland RC-300), synthesizers such as the Expressive E Osmose, the Arturia MicroFreak's vocoder, or effect pedals like the Microcosm by Hologram Electronics.

== Radio Personality ==
Sarah Àlainn hosts a morning radio show on Tokyo FM and Osaka FM, "Peace of Mind〜Saturday mornings with Sarah Àlainn", where she talks about music in a relaxed atmosphere. The first episode aired on the 4th of April 2015 and is still ongoing. As of March 2026, "Peace of Mind" has 569 episodes.

Across the years Àlainn has interviewed composers and musicians such as Yasunori Mitsuda, Katsuhisa Hattori, Ludovico Einaudi, Youn Sun Nah, Nobuo Uematsu and Kenji Ito.

== Album ==
Number	Release date	Title	Catalog Number	
Number	Release date	Title	Limited Edition	Regular Edition
1st	2012-6-20	Celeste	UCCY-9014	UCCY-1025
2nd	2014-9-24	SARAH	UCCY-9021 (Blu-ray); UCCY-9020 (DVD)	UCCY-1040
2nd	2015-4-8	SARAH – Deluxe Edition	UCCY-1054/5	
3rd	2015-11-25	f	UCCY-9025	UCCY-1059
4th	2017-2-22	ANIMA	UCCY-1074	
5th	2017-10-25	Cinema Music	UCCY-1084	
6th	2018-10-17	Timeless SARAH ALAINN BEST	UCCY-1090/1 (2CD)	
7th	2022-5-20	One	UWCD-90001	UWCD-10001
8th	2025-6-11	ISEKAI - ISEKAI - Anime & Video Game Muse	IVYR-10104/5	IVYR-10106
9th	2026-10-28	Hibi - Seasons that could be	IVYR-10112	IVYR-10113

== Video game songs ==
Release year	Game	Song title	Composer
2010	Xenoblade Chronicles	Beyond The Sky	Yasunori Mitsuda
2012	Time Travelers	The Final Time Traveler	Hideki Sakamoto
2017	Valkyria Revolution	Azure Revolution	Yasunori Mitsuda
2017	Valkyria Revolution	Lacrimosa ~ Tears to Dust	Yasunori Mitsuda
2017	Valkyria Revolution	Feel My Wrath	Yasunori Mitsuda
2017	Valkyria Revolution	Requiem in the Dark Night ~Presage and Death~	Yasunori Mitsuda
2017	Valkyria Revolution	VALKYRIA ~The Power of Destruction~	Yasunori Mitsuda
2017	Valkyria Revolution	Eternal Rest	Yasunori Mitsuda
2022	Monster Hunter Rise: Sunbreak	Sunbreak	Satoshi Hori
2024	Eiyuden Chronicles: Hundred Heroes	Flags of Brave	Michiko Naruke, Motoi Sakuraba
2024	SaGa: Emerald Beyond	1. Crazy For Who?; 2. Beyond the Doors	Kenji Ito
2026	OPUS: Prism Peak	I Am Farewell Itself, I Am Life	Kevin Penkin

== Anime and TV music ==
Release year	Title	Song title	Composer
2018	Segodon (TV historical drama)	Wa ga kokyô, Segodon Kikô Satsuma-hen, Segodon Kikô Yoshinosuke-hen, Waga kokyô ～Umi no kanata～	Harumi Fuuki
2021	The Promised Neverland (Anime)	Main Theme, Isabella's Theme	Takahiro Ōbata
2022	Irina (Anime)	Simple Life ~ My Beloved	Yasunori Mitsuda
2025	Bâan (Anime short film)	Homebird	Kevin Penkin

== TV and radio shows ==
- Kabuki Kool (NHK World Japan, since April 2018). TV program explaining the art of kabuki to non-Japanese audiences. Hosted with Kataoka Ainosuke VI.
- Peace of Mind (Tokyo FM/FM Osaka, since April 2015) Radio show featuring famous and rare tracks from Japan and the world.
