= Norimasa Fujisawa =

Japanese singer (born 1983)

Norimasa Fujisawa 藤澤 教正
- Born: March 8, 1983 (age 43); Sapporo, Hokkaido, Japan
- Origin: Japan
- Genres: J-Pop, pop opera
- Occupations: Singer, composer
- Years active: 2008–present
- Labels: Dreamusic (until 2015); Warner Music Japan (2015–2018); Dattan Music (since 2021)
- Website: fujisawanorimasa.net

Norimasa Fujisawa (藤澤 ノリマサ, Fujisawa Norimasa; born March 8, 1983 in Sapporo, Hokkaido) is a Japanese singer and composer. He is known for his works in the style of pop opera, fusing pop music and operatic singing in one song.

== Personal life ==
Norimasa Fujisawa was born and raised in a musical family, with his father being a vocalist and his mother who was running karaoke classes. His drive to become a singer himself, was ignited during his first year at elementary school, when he was watching a singer on television. In the third grade, he made his first experience as a singer on stage. In 2001, he moved from Sapporo to Tokyo to enter the Musashino Music College. After his graduation, he aimed for a debut as a solo artist and worked vigorously on songwriting and various live performances. Fujisawa has a dog, to whom he dedicated the song "Somebody give me a name" from his album "La Luce" in 2021.

Characteristic for his music style is the merge of pop music and opera or classical pieces, stating: "In the process of aiming to become a professional singer, I have pioneered the current genre of pop opera, which uses two singing methods, pop music and opera, in one song. I think, some of you may not be familiar with it, but I hope you will listen to it once."

== Career ==
In October 2014, Fujisawa released his second mini album Sogno: Yume. In January 2015, Fujisawa transferred from the Smile Company to Production Ogi.

Fujisawa participated in three editions of the annual touring ice show Fantasy on Ice from 2016 to 2018, after being approached by music director Satoshi Takebe. In 2017, he performed a pop music arrangement of Beethoven's classical piece "Ode to joy" – Symphony No. 9 in the finale of the show amongst others. Fujisawa is the only guest artist in the history of Fantasy on Ice with three consecutive appearances.

In 2021, he teamed up with lyricist Gorō Matsui and released his first original full-length album La Luce on May 19. He presented the songs at the "Norimasa Fujisawa La Luce Classical Concert 2021", which was held at the Kioi Hall in Tokyo on September 5, and the following week at the Sumitomo Life Izumi Hall in Osaka. For the creation of the album, Fujisawa and Matsui took a new approach. They didn't stick to the common practice of setting a deadline, but took their time during the COVID-19 pandemic to dive into a wide range of different themes. According to Matsui, each song reflects a part of Fujisawa's life like "Letters" being a song about his parents or "On the way home" about his childhood friends. Fujisawa also expanded his signature pop opera style by mixing it with new features like whispering sounds or spoken passages.

In April 2022, he released another song in collaboration with Matsui with the title "Return to life". Matsui described the song as a "return to life for Norimasa Fujisawa", but it was also created with the intention to "illuminate the hearts of people living in the present with music". On April 5, Fujisawa performed the song live for the first time as part of the "Norimasa Fujisawa National Lunch Show 2022" held at the Portopia Hotel in Kobe.

== Discography ==
=== Singles ===
- Dattan Jin no Odori; Released April 30, 2008
- Vincero -Binchero-; Released August 17, 2008
- Cross Heart; Released October 22, 2008
- Prayer; Released April 22, 2009
- Ai no Kiseki; Released July 15, 2009
- Domani ~Ashita o Tsukamaete~; Released November 4, 2009
- Sailing my Life; Released January 13, 2010
- Kiminiaitai/Egao no Riyū; Released June 9, 2010
- Kibō no Uta ~Kōkyōkyokudai Kyū-Ban~; Released October 13, 2010
- Sakura no Uta; Released January 26, 2011
- Mirai no Bokura e; Released February 2, 2012
- Period; Released September 25, 2013
- Hasta la Victoria ~Aīda Yori~; Released October 9, 2013
- Ai no Aisatsu ~Yozora ni Hoshi wo Chiribamete/Brand New Day; Released December 9, 2015
- Stay forever ~Anata wo mamoritai:Released September 13, 2017

=== Albums ===
- Voice of Love ~Ai no Chikara~; Released November 26, 2008
- Appassionato ~Jōnetsu no Uta~; Released December 2, 2009
- Kibō no Uta ~La Speranza~; Released February 9, 2011
- 'O sole mio! ~Itaria no Uta~; Released August 24, 2011
- Norimasa Fujisawa ~Kokoro no Arubamu~; Released; August 1, 2012
- Sing for You; Released September 5, 2012
- Pop Opera Theatre ~5th Anniversary Best~; Released October 23, 2013
- Sogno -Yume-; Released October 29, 2014
- Pop Opera Theater ~Another Best; Released December 9, 2015
- MESSAGE; Released August 24, 2016
