= Champions on Ice =

Touring ice show in the United States

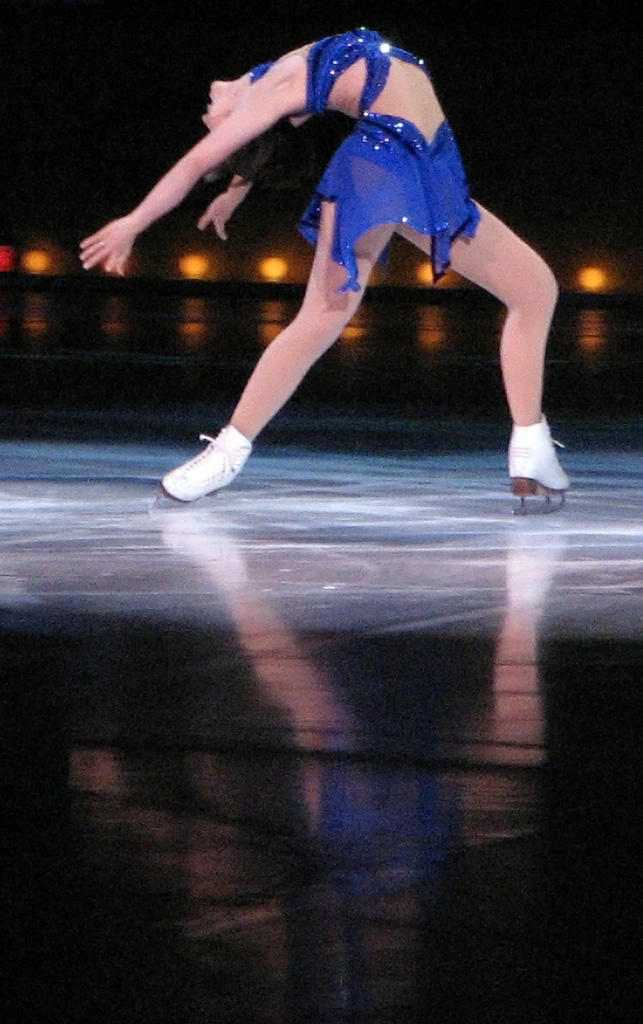
Shizuka Arakawa performs during a Champions on Ice show in 2006.

Champions on Ice was a touring ice show in the United States. The show featured a large cast of both professional and Olympic-eligible figure skaters along with novelty acts such as skating acrobats. The shows were focused primarily on solo performances by the skaters rather than ensemble work or acting out stories.

The tour was originally run by Tom Collins Enterprises. Collins first organized the tour following the 1969 World Figure Skating Championships. It was initially known as the "Tour of World Figure Skating Champions", and featured top amateur skaters who performed under an arrangement with the International Skating Union (ISU). When the ISU liberalized its amateur status rules in 1990, Collins began to add professional skaters to the tour, as well as active eligible competitors. The tour adopted the name of "Champions on Ice" in 1998.

In November 2006, Anschutz Entertainment Group and Sergio Cánovas purchased Champions on Ice. AEG is the owner of Champions on Ice U.S.A. while Sergio Cánovas owns the brand in the rest of the world. In 2008, Champions on Ice cancelled its tour and formed a partnership with Stars on Ice. In 2012, Sergio Cánovas's new Champions on Ice began touring internationally, headlined by Evgeni Plushenko.

Skaters who had a long association with the tour include Brian Boitano, Viktor Petrenko, Michelle Kwan, and Todd Eldredge.
