= Solnechny (inhabited locality) =

Solnechny (Russian: Со́лнечный; masculine), Solnechnaya (Со́лнечная; feminine), or Solnechnoye (Со́лнечное; neuter) is the name of several inhabited localities in Russia:

== Altai Krai ==
As of 2010, two rural localities in Altai Krai bear this name:

- Solnechny, Altai Krai, a settlement in Zavetilyichevsky Selsoviet of Aleysky District
- Solnechnoye, Altai Krai, a selo in Solnechny Selsoviet of Pervomaysky District

== Amur Oblast ==
As of 2010, two rural localities in Amur Oblast bear this name:

- Solnechny, Amur Oblast, a settlement in Solnechny Rural Settlement of Skovorodinsky District
- Solnechnoye, Amur Oblast, a selo in Priozerny Rural Settlement of Ivanovsky District

== Astrakhan Oblast ==
As of 2010, one rural locality in Astrakhan Oblast bears this name:

- Solnechny, Astrakhan Oblast, a settlement in Zabuzansky Selsoviet of Krasnoyarsky District

== Chelyabinsk Oblast ==
As of 2010, one rural locality in Chelyabinsk Oblast bears this name:

- Solnechny, Chelyabinsk Oblast, a settlement in Solnechny Selsoviet of Sosnovsky District

== Republic of Dagestan ==
As of 2010, one rural locality in the Republic of Dagestan bears this name:

- Solnechnoye, Republic of Dagestan, a selo in Khasavyurtovsky District

== Kaliningrad Oblast ==
As of 2010, three rural localities in Kaliningrad Oblast bear this name:

- Solnechnoye, Bagrationovsky District, Kaliningrad Oblast, a settlement in Gvardeysky Rural Okrug of Bagrationovsky District
- Solnechnoye, Guryevsky District, Kaliningrad Oblast, a settlement in Nizovsky Rural Okrug of Guryevsky District
- Solnechnoye, Ozyorsky District, Kaliningrad Oblast, a settlement in Gavrilovsky Rural Okrug of Ozyorsky District

== Karachay-Cherkess Republic ==
As of 2010, one rural locality in the Karachay-Cherkess Republic bears this name:

- Solnechny, Karachay-Cherkess Republic, a settlement in Prikubansky District

== Kemerovo Oblast ==
As of 2010, two rural localities in Kemerovo Oblast bear this name:

- Solnechny, Kemerovsky District, Kemerovo Oblast, a settlement in Shcheglovskaya Rural Territory of Kemerovsky District
- Solnechny, Leninsk-Kuznetsky District, Kemerovo Oblast, a settlement in Gornyatskaya Rural Territory of Leninsk-Kuznetsky District

== Khabarovsk Krai ==
As of 2010, one urban locality in Khabarovsk Krai bears this name:

- Solnechny, Khabarovsk Krai, a work settlement in Solnechny District

== Republic of Khakassia ==
As of 2010, one rural locality in the Republic of Khakassia bears this name:

- Solnechnoye, Republic of Khakassia, a selo in Solnechny Selsoviet of Ust-Abakansky District

== Khanty-Mansi Autonomous Okrug ==
As of 2010, one rural locality in Khanty-Mansi Autonomous Okrug bears this name:

- Solnechny, Khanty-Mansi Autonomous Okrug, a settlement in Surgutsky District

== Komi Republic ==
As of 2010, one rural locality in the Komi Republic bears this name:

- Solnechny, Komi Republic, a settlement under the administrative jurisdiction of Blagoyevo Urban-Type Settlement Administrative Territory in Udorsky District

== Kostroma Oblast ==
As of 2010, two rural localities in Kostroma Oblast bear this name:

- Solnechny, Krasnoselsky District, Kostroma Oblast, a settlement in Borovikovskoye Settlement of Krasnoselsky District
- Solnechny, Susaninsky District, Kostroma Oblast, a settlement in Chentsovskoye Settlement of Susaninsky District

== Krasnodar Krai ==
As of 2010, one rural locality in Krasnodar Krai bears this name:

- Solnechny, Krasnodar Krai, a settlement in Obraztsovy Rural Okrug of Leningradsky District

== Krasnoyarsk Krai ==
As of 2010, one urban locality in Krasnoyarsk Krai bears this name:

- Solnechny, Krasnoyarsk Krai, a settlement; administratively incorporated as a closed administrative-territorial formation

== Kurgan Oblast ==
As of 2010, one rural locality in Kurgan Oblast bears this name:

- Solnechnaya, Kurgan Oblast, a village in Yagodninsky Selsoviet of Almenevsky District

== Kursk Oblast ==
As of 2010, one rural locality in Kursk Oblast bears this name:

- Solnechny, Kursk Oblast, a settlement in Solnechny Selsoviet of Zolotukhinsky District

== Leningrad Oblast ==
As of 2010, one rural locality in Leningrad Oblast bears this name:

- Solnechnoye, Leningrad Oblast, a settlement of the crossing in Plodovskoye Settlement Municipal Formation of Priozersky District

== Mari El Republic ==
As of 2010, one rural locality in the Mari El Republic bears this name:

- Solnechny, Mari El Republic, a settlement in Solnechny Rural Okrug of Sovetsky District

== Novgorod Oblast ==
As of 2010, one rural locality in Novgorod Oblast bears this name:

- Solnechnaya, Novgorod Oblast, a village in Volokskoye Settlement of Borovichsky District

== Omsk Oblast ==
As of 2010, one rural locality in Omsk Oblast bears this name:

- Solnechnoye, Omsk Oblast, a selo in Solnechny Rural Okrug of Russko-Polyansky District

== Orenburg Oblast ==
As of 2010, one rural locality in Orenburg Oblast bears this name:

- Solnechny, Orenburg Oblast, a settlement in Yasnopolyansky Selsoviet of Tashlinsky District

== Perm Krai ==
As of 2013, one rural locality in Perm Krai bears this name:

- Solnechny, Perm Krai, a settlement in Usolsky District

== Primorsky Krai ==
As of 2010, one rural locality in Primorsky Krai bears this name:

- Solnechnoye, Primorsky Krai, a selo in Dalnerechensky District

== Rostov Oblast ==
As of 2010, two rural localities in Rostov Oblast bear this name:

- Solnechny, Azovsky District, Rostov Oblast, a settlement in Kalinovskoye Rural Settlement of Azovsky District
- Solnechny, Volgodonskoy District, Rostov Oblast, a settlement in Dobrovolskoye Rural Settlement of Volgodonskoy District

== Ryazan Oblast ==
As of 2010, one rural locality in Ryazan Oblast bears this name:

- Solnechnoye, Ryazan Oblast, a selo in Gornostayevsky Rural Okrug of Mikhaylovsky District

== Saint Petersburg ==
As of 2010, one urban locality in Saint Petersburg bears this name:

- Solnechnoye, Saint Petersburg, a settlement in Kurortny District

== Sakha Republic ==
As of 2010, one urban locality in the Sakha Republic bears this name:

- Solnechny, Sakha Republic, an urban-type settlement in Ust-Maysky District

== Saratov Oblast ==
As of 2010, two rural localities in Saratov Oblast bear this name:

- Solnechny, Fyodorovsky District, Saratov Oblast, a settlement in Fyodorovsky District
- Solnechny, Marksovsky District, Saratov Oblast, a settlement in Marksovsky District

== Smolensk Oblast ==
As of 2010, one rural locality in Smolensk Oblast bears this name:

- Solnechnaya, Smolensk Oblast, a village in Repinskoye Rural Settlement of Yartsevsky District

== Sverdlovsk Oblast ==
As of 2010, one rural locality in Sverdlovsk Oblast bears this name:

- Solnechny, Sverdlovsk Oblast, a settlement under the administrative jurisdiction of the Town of Beryozovsky

== Tver Oblast ==
As of 2010, five inhabited localities in Tver Oblast bear this name.

Urban localities

- Solnechny, Tver Oblast, an urban-type settlement; administratively incorporated as an okrug, an upper-level administrative division of Tver Oblast

Rural localities

- Solnechny, Bezhetsky District, Tver Oblast, a settlement in Zhitishchenskoye Rural Settlement of Bezhetsky District
- Solnechny, Bologovsky District, Tver Oblast, a settlement in Berezayskoye Rural Settlement of Bologovsky District
- Solnechny, Vyshnevolotsky District, Tver Oblast, a settlement in Solnechnoye Rural Settlement of Vyshnevolotsky District
- Solnechnoye, Tver Oblast, a village in Molodotudskoye Rural Settlement of Oleninsky District

== Udmurt Republic ==
As of 2010, one rural locality in the Udmurt Republic bears this name:

- Solnechny, Udmurt Republic, a selo in Selychinsky Selsoviet of Yakshur-Bodyinsky District

== Vologda Oblast ==
As of 2010, one rural locality in Vologda Oblast bears this name:

- Solnechny, Vologda Oblast, a settlement in Ustyuzhensky Selsoviet of Ustyuzhensky District

== Voronezh Oblast ==
As of 2010, one rural locality in Voronezh Oblast bears this name:

- Solnechny, Voronezh Oblast, a settlement in Yamenskoye Rural Settlement of Ramonsky District

== Yaroslavl Oblast ==
As of 2010, one rural locality in Yaroslavl Oblast bears this name:

- Solnechny, Yaroslavl Oblast, a settlement in Lyubilkovsky Rural Okrug of Rostovsky District
