= Evgeni Plushenko =

Russian retired figure skater and coach (born 1982)

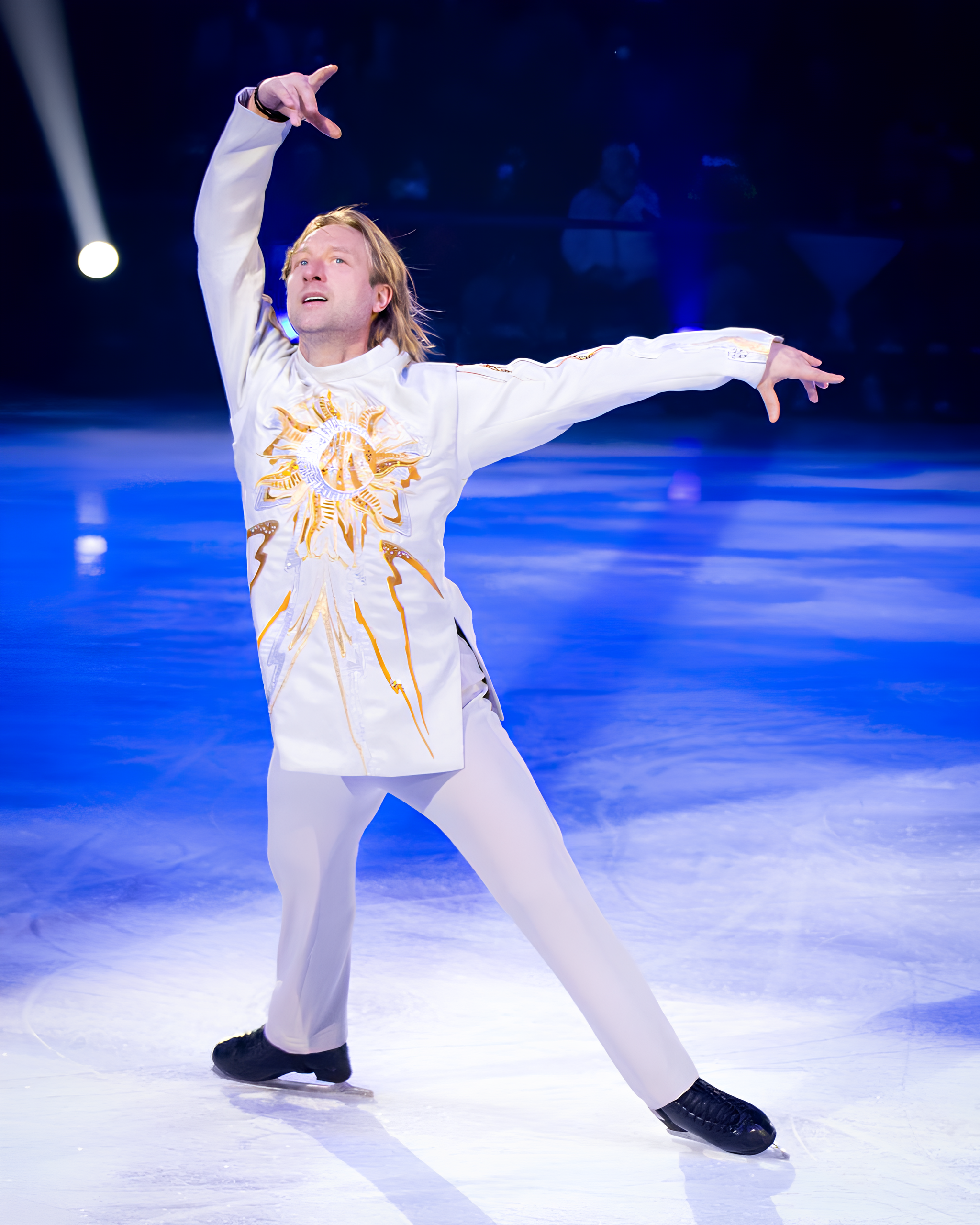
- Plushenko at the Champions Union show in 2023

Personal information
- Native name: Евгений Викторович Плющенко
- Full name: Evgeni Viktorovich Plushenko
- Born: 3 November 1982 (age 44) Dzhamku, Solnechny District, Khabarovsk Krai, Russian SFSR, Soviet Union
- Height: 1.80 m (5 ft 11 in)

Figure skating career
- Country: Russia
- Skating club: Yubileyny Sports Palace
- Began skating: 1986
- Retired: 13 February 2014, 31 March 2017

Medal record
Event	Gold medal – first place	Silver medal – second place	Bronze medal – third place
Olympic Games	1	2	0
Olympic Games – Team event	1	0	0
World Championships	3	1	1
European Championships	7	3	0
Grand Prix Final	4	2	1
Russian Championships	10	1	1
World Junior Championships	1	0	0
Medal list
Olympic Games
Gold medal – first place	2006 Torino	Singles
Gold medal – first place	2014 Sochi	Team
Silver medal – second place	2002 Salt Lake City	Singles
Silver medal – second place	2010 Vancouver	Singles
World Championships
Gold medal – first place	2001 Vancouver	Singles
Gold medal – first place	2003 Washington, D.C.	Singles
Gold medal – first place	2004 Dortmund	Singles
Silver medal – second place	1999 Helsinki	Singles
Bronze medal – third place	1998 Minneapolis	Singles
European Championships
Gold medal – first place	2000 Vienna	Singles
Gold medal – first place	2001 Bratislava	Singles
Gold medal – first place	2003 Malmö	Singles
Gold medal – first place	2005 Turin	Singles
Gold medal – first place	2006 Lyon	Singles
Gold medal – first place	2010 Tallinn	Singles
Gold medal – first place	2012 Sheffield	Singles
Silver medal – second place	1998 Milan	Singles
Silver medal – second place	1999 Prague	Singles
Silver medal – second place	2004 Budapest	Singles
Grand Prix Final
Gold medal – first place	1999–2000 Lyon	Singles
Gold medal – first place	2000–01 Tokyo	Singles
Gold medal – first place	2002–03 Saint Petersburg	Singles
Gold medal – first place	2004–05 Beijing	Singles
Silver medal – second place	2001–02 Kitchener	Singles
Silver medal – second place	2003–04 Colorado Springs	Singles
Bronze medal – third place	1998–99 Saint Petersburg	Singles
Russian Championships
Gold medal – first place	1999 Moscow	Singles
Gold medal – first place	2000 Moscow	Singles
Gold medal – first place	2001 Moscow	Singles
Gold medal – first place	2002 Moscow	Singles
Gold medal – first place	2004 Saint Petersburg	Singles
Gold medal – first place	2005 Saint Petersburg	Singles
Gold medal – first place	2006 Kazan	Singles
Gold medal – first place	2010 Saint Petersburg	Singles
Gold medal – first place	2012 Saransk	Singles
Gold medal – first place	2013 Sochi	Singles
Silver medal – second place	2014 Sochi	Singles
Bronze medal – third place	1998 Moscow	Singles
World Junior Championships
Gold medal – first place	1997 Seoul	Singles

Evgeni Viktorovich Plushenko (Russian: Евгений Викторович Плющенко, born 3 November 1982) is a Russian figure skating coach and former figure skater. He is a four-time Olympic medalist (2006 gold, 2014 team gold, 2002 & 2010 silver), a three-time World champion (2001, 2003, 2004), a seven-time European champion (2000, 2001, 2003, 2005, 2006, 2010, 2012), a four-time Grand Prix Final champion (1999–2000, 2000–01, 2002–03, 2004–05), and a ten-time Russian national champion (1999–2002, 2004–2006, 2010, 2012–2013). Plushenko's four Olympic medals once tied with Sweden's Gillis Grafström's record for most Olympic medals in figure skating, which has since been surpassed by Scott Moir and Tessa Virtue. He also won a record total of 22 titles on the Grand Prix circuit.

== Early life and education ==
Plushenko was born on 3 November 1982 in Dzhamku, Solnechny District, Khabarovsk Krai, Soviet Union. His mother was originally from Volgograd, Russian SFSR, and his father, a carpenter, was born in Donetsk. He has an older sister. Plushenko lived in Volgograd before moving to Saint Petersburg in 1994. His mother died on 10 July 2015.

A 1998 graduate of school No. 91 in Petrogradsky District, he began studying at the Lesgaft University in 2000, graduating in 2005, and at the Faculty of tourism and hospitality of the Saint Petersburg State University of Engineering and Economics in 2004.

His surname is most commonly romanized as Plushenko but other variations exist. The Cyrillic shcha ("щ") may be transliterated as 'shch' (scholarly šč), but the simplified variant 'sh' is often used for convention. The letter "ю" is pronounced "yu", so a more accurate transliteration would be "Plyushchenko". His given name is romanized as Evgeni or Yevgeny.

== Skating career ==
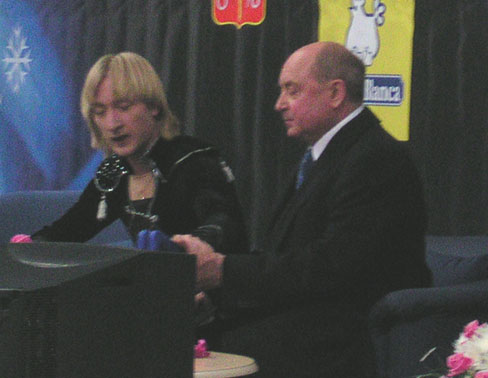
Plushenko and longtime coach Alexei Mishin at the 2004 Russian National Championships

=== Early career ===
Since Plushenko frequently suffered from colds, his mother decided he needed exercise and enrolled him in figure skating lessons at age four. His first coach was Tatiana Skala. He trained in Volgograd, Russia until his ice rink closed when he was 11 years old. In 1994, his mother took him to Saint Petersburg to train under the guidance of Alexei Mishin.

Plushenko made quick progress on the international scene. He became the youngest ever World Junior Champion and World medalist at age 14, winning the 1997 World Junior Championships. The following year, at age 15, he won the bronze medal at the 1998 World Championships.

=== 1999–2001 ===
Plushenko developed a rivalry with Alexei Yagudin, with whom he trained under Mishin until Yagudin left in 1998. In 2000, Plushenko defeated Yagudin at the 2000 European Championships, but finished fourth at the 2000 World Championships.

Plushenko had a very successful 2000–01 season, winning every event he entered, including his first World title.

=== 2002–2006 ===
At the 2002 Winter Olympics, Plushenko and Yagudin were considered co-favorites. Plushenko finished 4th in the short program after falling on his quadruple toe loop, but skated a free skating to "Carmen" and pulled up to finish in 2nd place overall.

Plushenko won most of the competitions he entered in the following four years. He finished second only twice. The first time was to Emanuel Sandhu at the 2003–04 Grand Prix Final for misunderstanding the new ISU Judging System which was now in use. The second was the 2004 European Championships, where he lost to Brian Joubert. He had a difficult 2004–05 season. At the 2005 World Championships in Moscow, Russia, an injury forced him to withdraw after the short program. He eventually required groin surgery. He underwent surgery to correct the problem in Munich, Germany in spring 2005.

Going into the 2006 Winter Olympics in Turin, Italy, Plushenko was the overwhelming favorite because of his past success under the new judging system. Plushenko skated two solid programs and became the Olympic champion. He finished the short program ten points ahead of his closest rival, setting a new ISU record for the short program. His free skating was just as strong, and also set a new ISU record. Plushenko's free skating music was specially arranged for him by violinist Edvin Marton.

=== 2006–2008: Hiatus ===
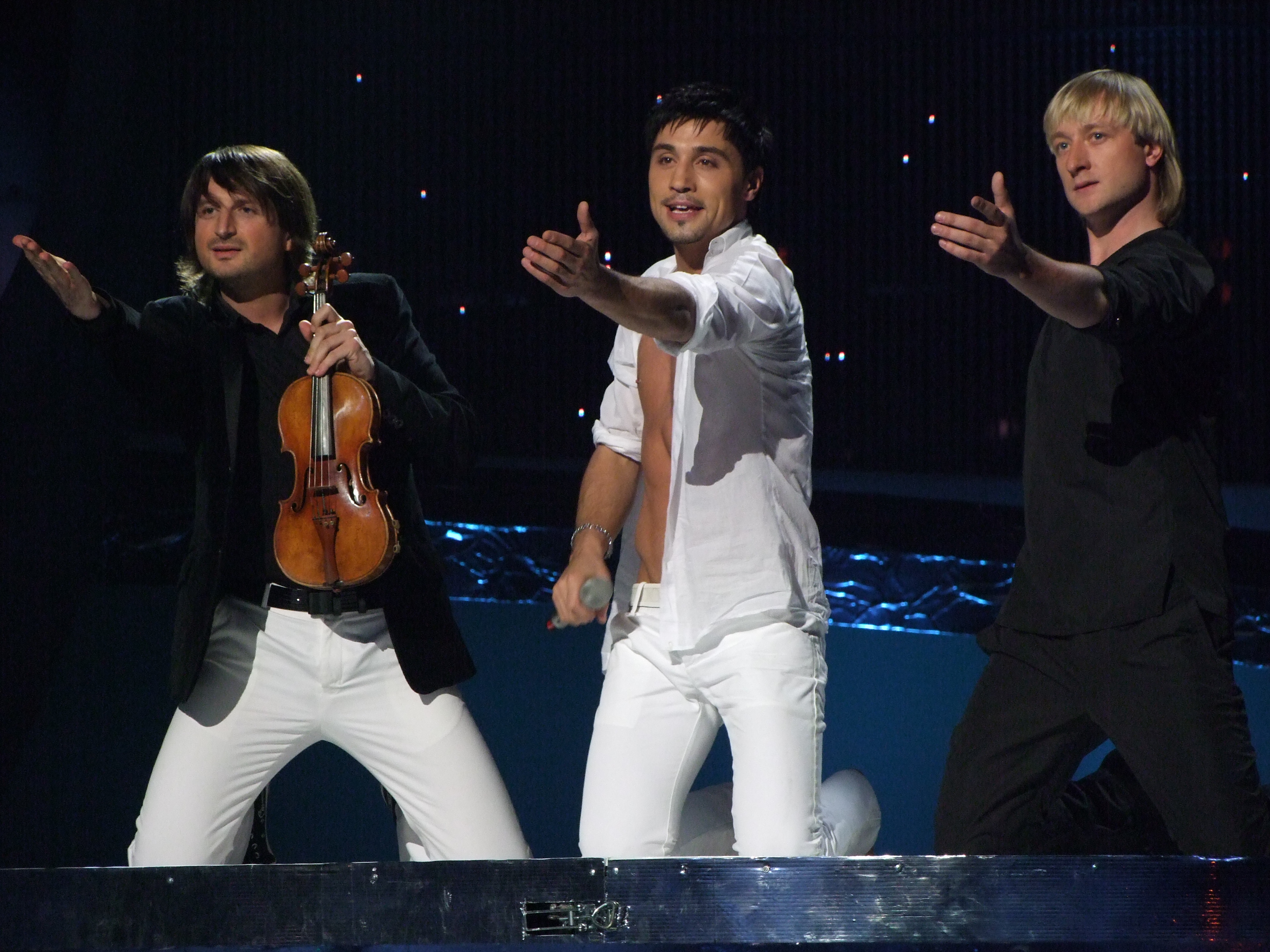
Edvin Marton, Dima Bilan, and Plushenko at the 2008 Eurovision Song Contest

Plushenko took a break from competitive skating following the 2006 Olympic season. He has said the off-season helped him rest and recover from past knee injuries he has battled.

After seeing the poor results of Russian skaters at the 2007 World Championships (the worst since 1960), Plushenko was worried about Russia losing its status as a dominant force in figure skating, and was also concerned that Russia might even lose confidence for its skaters for the 2010 Winter Olympics. He announced in April 2007 that he decided to return to competitive skating for the 2007–08 season to keep Russia at a competitive level with other countries until the next generation of Russian skaters could take over but a return to the ice did not materialize. Plushenko also stated that he planned to compete in the 2010 Winter Olympics.

In 2008, Plushenko, together with violinist Edvin Marton, accompanied Dima Bilan on stage as part of the winning Eurovision Song Contest performance "Believe" in Belgrade, Serbia. Plushenko skated on stage as part of the performance.

=== 2009–2010: Return to competition ===
In March 2009, Plushenko announced that he had returned to training with longtime coach Alexei Mishin in order to prepare for the 2010 Olympics.

Plushenko led the short program in his return to skating at the 2009 Cup of Russia on 23 October 2009. He earned 82.25 points for the short, and won the free skating with a score of 158.40. Overall, he won the gold in his comeback with a total of 240.65 points.

In December 2009, Plushenko signed a partnership agreement with the international management agency FlashLight led by the sports agent Andreas Goller.

At the 2010 Russian Championships, Plushenko earned 100.09 points for his short program. He received 171.50 points in the free skating to win his eighth Russian Championship with 271.59 points.

At the 2010 European Championships, Plushenko set a new world record score in the short program by scoring 91.30 points, and went on to win the event for a sixth time with a total score of 255.39 points.

He skated at the 2010 Winter Olympics in Vancouver, British Columbia, Canada and received a score of 90.85 for his short program performance, breaking the Olympic record and leading all competitors. Following his skate, Plushenko said "Without a quad it's not men's figure skating. I will do the quad in any case. I believe that the quad is the future of figure skating. The quad is necessary, that is my opinion."

Plushenko finished second in the free skating and second overall, ultimately winning the silver medal with a total score of 256.36, 1.31 points behind the winner Evan Lysacek. In the free skating, he landed a quadruple toe loop-triple toe loop combination but left a planned double loop out of a combination jump. He and Lysacek received a similar total score for program components, but Plushenko had a lower total technical elements score than Lysacek. He said of the gold medal winner, Evan Lysacek, "I think we need to change the judging system – a quad is a quad. If an Olympic champion doesn't do a quad, well I don't know..." In an interview to Russian newspaper Izvestia, Plushenko brought attention to the fact that, following his short program, three judges placed him 21st and 22nd for skating skills. He said, "Strangely, the computer did not drop any one of the three. But what it did instead was to drop those judges who awarded me first place. Under the current system, if this is the way judges' marks are awarded, you can win, and you can just as equally lose. Don't get me wrong. I don't want to criticize the new rules, they are not bad. But they do need further refinement." He also expressed dismay over the Russian Figure Skating Federation not standing up for one of their athletes. "After the short program, I should have had at least a 5 point lead over my competitors. In the end, however, the gap amounted to a mere 0.55 to which our Federation did not react at all." Russian skating champion Irina Rodnina said that although she had hoped Plushenko would win, Lysacek had a stronger overall performance. At the same time, some well-known skaters and coaches said they supported Plushenko and believe he deserved the gold medal. Among them were figure skater Elvis Stojko and the coaches Reinhardt Ketterer, Tatiana Tarasova, and Galina Zmievskaya. During the medal ceremony, Plushenko who felt that his free skate performance was strong enough for gold, stepped on the top level of the podium on his way to the runner-up level, considered by some to be unsportsmanlike. Plushenko's website afterwards proclaimed "Silver of Salt Lake", "Gold of Torino", and "Platinum of Vancouver", with the platinum medal claim being removed after ridicule by critics. Following the Olympic medal ceremony, Russian Prime Minister Vladimir Putin sent Plushenko a telegram, congratulating him on the wonderful Olympic performance and saying his silver was worth gold. On March 24, 2010 Siberian jewelers decided to award Plushenko a special medal weighing more than half a kilo of pure gold.

Plushenko became the only living single skater to have won medals at three Olympics. He withdrew from the 2010 World Championships citing injury.

=== Loss of eligibility and reinstatement ===
Plushenko skated in exhibitions soon after his withdrawal from Worlds. On 28 June 2010, the International Skating Union announced that Plushenko had lost his eligibility due to participating in skating shows in March and April without the Russian figure skating federation's authorization. He was given 21 days to appeal this decision to the Court of Arbitration for Sport, which he did not do. As a result, his loss of eligibility became final as announced by the ISU on 23 August 2010. However, a request for reinstatement could be made in line with ISU regulations subject to a review and decision by the ISU Council. In September 2010, he stated his goal of competing at the 2014 Winter Olympics. In October 2010, he competed in the Japan Open 2010 as part of the European team. Each team was allowed to have an "ineligible" member. He placed third in the men's event.

Plushenko skated in ice shows around the world while continuing to train for a possible return to competition by practicing quad Salchows and quad loops. In April 2011, he sent a letter to the Russian figure skating federation president, Aleksandr Gorshkov, seeking reinstatement. Plushenko said he hoped the ban was not a retaliation of his criticism of the judging at the Olympics and that he would like to return to competition with a clean slate. Although he said he would have liked to compete at the 2011 World Championships if the ban had been lifted, he did not feel he would have been ready due to lost training time as a result of injury. On 12 June 2011, it was announced that the ISU had reinstated him by a unanimous vote.

=== 2011–2012 season: Return to competition ===
On 12 June 2011, Plushenko said that he had undergone knee surgery due to a meniscus problem but would be back on track within two weeks. Although his left knee continued bothering him, he resumed training in Mishin's group, alongside Artur Gachinski, saying "Competition is always good, remember there was a time when Alexei Urmanov, Alexei Yagudin and I all trained together. We pushed each other. With Artur in the group, I have a sparring partner. He does a quad and I have to do a quad as well." He declined an offer to skate in a 50-show tour in order to train.

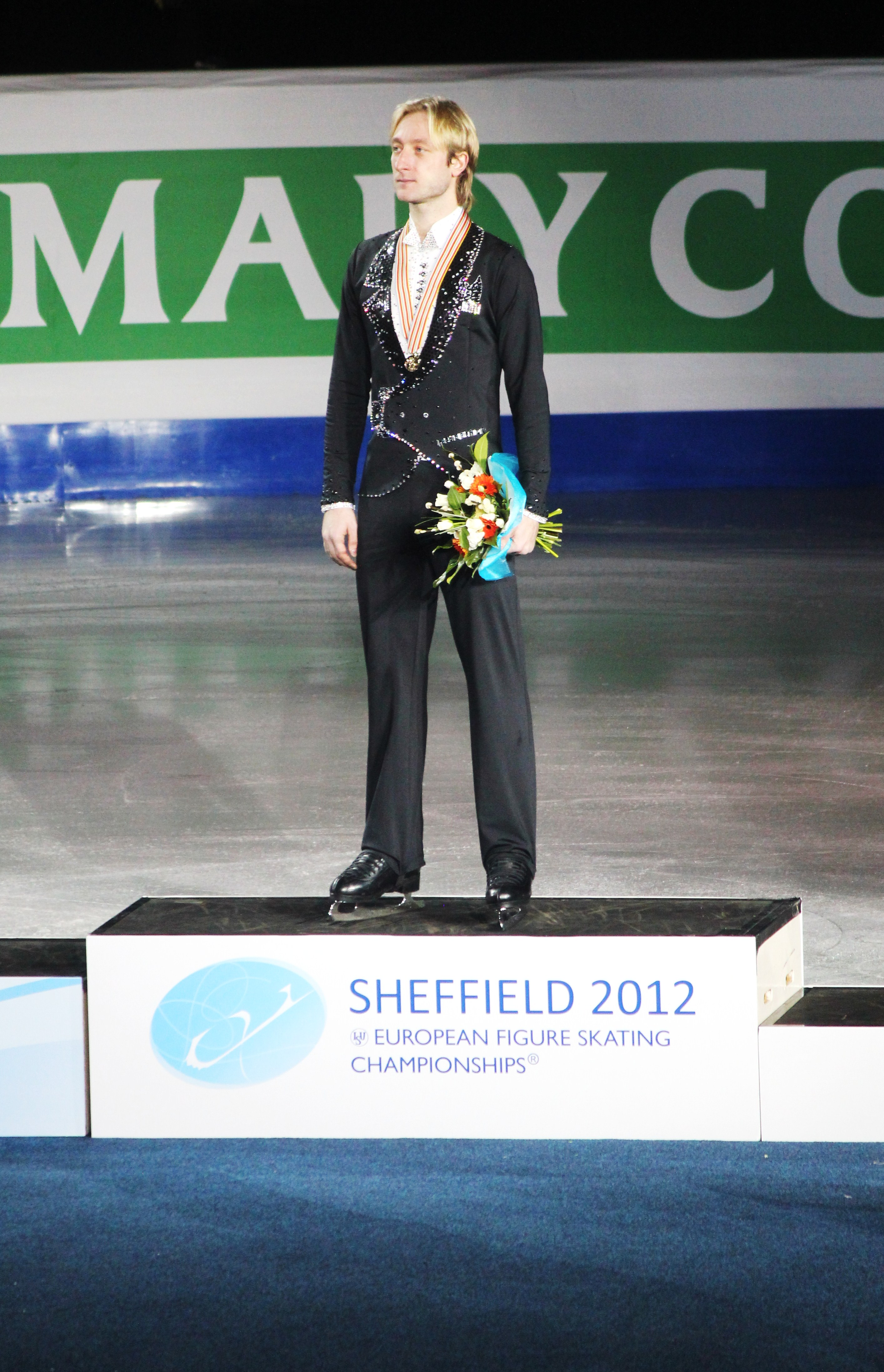
Plushenko during the men's medals ceremony at the 2012 European Championships

In December 2011, Plushenko competed at the 2012 Russian Championships. He won the short program with a score of 88.24 and then won the free skating with a score of 171.43, to win his ninth national title. He was named to the Russian team for the 2012 European Championships, although he had not competed internationally recently enough to have the minimum technical elements scores (20 in the short program, 35 in the free). The Russian figure skating federation asked the ISU to allow him to compete, with Aleksandr Gorshkov saying that the minimum scores were designed to filter out weak skaters. In January 2012, the ISU released a statement confirming that Plushenko had been allowed to participate in the 2012 European Championships. On 26 January 2012, Plushenko confirmed that he would undergo additional surgery on his meniscus after the competition and would be unable to compete at the 2012 World Championships.

Plushenko competed at the 2012 European Championships, his first international competition since 2010. He earned a score of 84.71 for his short program and a personal-best score of 176.52 for free skating. His overall competition score of 261.23 points was also a personal best and earned him his seventh European title. He became only the third men's skater to capture seven European titles and the only one to do so in modern history. He is surpassed only by two skaters from the early history of the sport, Sweden's Ulrich Salchow, who won nine titles from 1898 to 1913, and Austria's Karl Schafer, who won eight from 1929 to 1936. In a post-Europeans interview, Plushenko said that he had not planned to compete after 2010 but found he missed the adrenaline of competition. He underwent surgery on his left knee to clean up the meniscus and repair a cartilage on 23 February 2012 in Germany. In February 2012, Plushenko also mentioned a back problem due to spinal disc herniation. It was later determined that back surgery would not be necessary. Mishin clarified that Plushenko was in good health overall.

=== 2012–2013 ===
In April and July 2012, Plushenko worked with Italian choreographer Pasquale Camerlengo on a new short program. In late June 2012, he also worked with Japanese choreographer Kenji Miyamoto on his free skating for the following season. His work on quad Salchows and Lutzes aggravated his spinal problem and he flew to Munich, Germany for surgery, which involved searing a disk hernia with a liquid. Although doctors recommended he stay off the ice for a month, Plushenko returned in seven days, explaining "I felt that I need to run fast in order to defend my position. I had the National Championships coming up, so, not only did I start to train too early, but I started to train too intensely." His decision led to complications and he received an injection, a block, in Saint Petersburg. He lost some of his jumps but got them back before the 2013 Russian Championships in Sochi, Russia. Plushenko won his 10th national title at the event. He said his plan was to compete at the 2013 European and World Championships if his health allowed him.

Plushenko withdrew from the 2013 European Championships after the short program due to his back problem. He underwent surgery on 31 January 2013 in Tel Aviv, Israel to replace a spinal disk with a synthetic one.

=== 2013–2014 ===
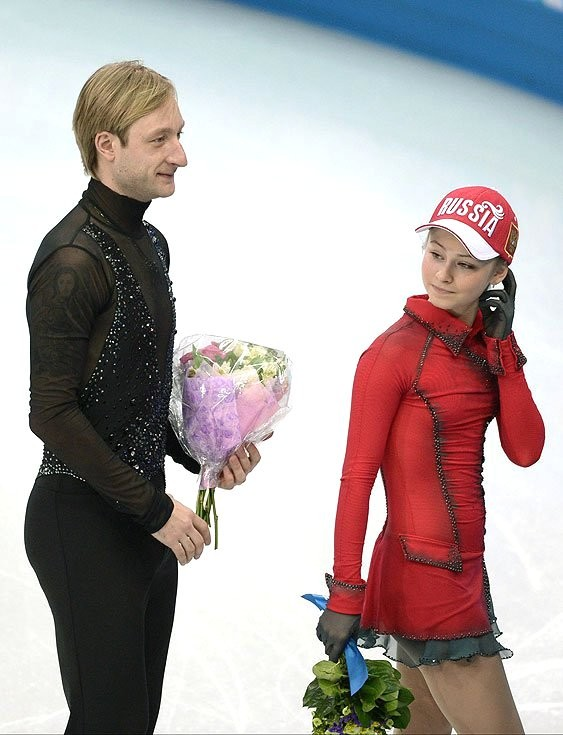
Plushenko at the 2014 Olympic team event with Yulia Lipnitskaya

As part of his preparation for the 2013–2014 season, Plushenko planned summer training camps in Pinzolo, Italy and Tartu, Estonia, followed by training in Saint Petersburg and Sochi.

On 7 November 2013, Plushenko returned to competition at the 22nd Volvo Open Cup in Riga, Latvia where he won the gold medal with an overall score of 263.25 points. He landed a 4T, 3A, 3A-3T in the free skating and obtained the minimum TES needed to compete at the 2014 Winter Olympics. He had one Grand Prix assignment, the 2013 Rostelecom Cup, but withdrew due to a minor knee injury. At the 2014 Russian Championships, Plushenko placed first in the short program and second in the free skating. He finished second overall behind Maxim Kovtun, his first loss at Nationals since placing third in 1998.

On 22 January 2014, it was announced that Plushenko had been awarded Russia's men's spot for the 2014 Winter Olympics. It was his fourth Olympics appearance. Offered the opportunity to be Russia's flagbearer, he said it was a great honor but he could not accept due to the competition schedule.

At the 2014 Winter Olympics, Plushenko competed in both the short and free skating segments of the team figure skating competition. He placed second in the short program with a personal best score of 91.39 behind Yuzuru Hanyu of Japan. He placed first in the free skating portion with a score of 168.20, garnering 19 points for his team. Russia won gold, ten points ahead of Canada who got silver. This was Plushenko's second Olympic gold medal, giving him a total of four Olympic medals, and he became one of the oldest figure skating Olympic champions. This tied him with Sweden's Gillis Grafström for the record of the most Olympic medals by a figure skater, since surpassed by the ice dance team of Scott Moir and Tessa Virtue. This was also Russia's first gold at the games.

After struggling with a back injury during practice, Plushenko decided to withdraw from the men's singles competition following his pre-short program warm up on 13 February 2014. Plushenko's withdrawal was after the Sunday deadline to name a replacement which left Russia without an entry in men's singles.

It was announced shortly after that Plushenko would be retiring from competitive skating, but was "not ruling out" the possibility of returning for the 2018 Winter Olympics in South Korea. On 2 March 2014, Plushenko announced that he was going to have another back surgery citing a snapped pin in his back, and ended any plans for a return to professional competition.

=== After Sochi Olympics ===
Plushenko expressed interest in coaching when he ended his skating career. After retiring officially from competition in March 2017, he opened his own skating school.

He was the coach of Adelina Sotnikova, Russia's controversial 2014 Olympic champion, from April 2017 until she retired in 2020. He is also the coach of Stanislava Konstantinova and Ekaterina Ryabova.

=== Coaching career ===
Plushenko's current students include:

- Anastasia Zinina (Russia)
- Veronika Zhilina (Azerbaijan) → from May 2020 – present
- Sofia Titova (Armenia) → from May 2020 – present
- Alena Zhilina (Russia) → from May 2020 – present
- Sofia Muravieva (Russia) → from 2020–2025, 2026–present: Champion 2021 JGP Austria, finished 6th at 2022 Russian Nationals
- Elena Kostyleva (Russia) → from May 2024 –

Former students include:

- Alexandra Trusova (Russia) → From May 2020 – May 2021.
- Alena Kostornaia (Russia) → from July 2020 – March 2021.
- Ekaterina Ryabova (Azerbaijan) → Finished 13th at 2019 Worlds and 6th at 2020 Europeans.
- Stanislava Konstantinova (Russia) → from February 2020 to January 2021.
- Anastasia Tarakanova (Russia) → 4th at 2018 JGP Final, 7th 2019 Russian Jr. Nationals
- Serafima Sakhanovich (Russia) → Champion 2019 CS Tallinn Trophy
- Sophia Shifrin (Israel) → from June 2022 – 2024

== Records and achievements ==
ISU abbreviations: Jumps
T	Toe loop
S	Salchow
Lo	Loop
F	Flip
Lz	Lutz
A	Axel

Evgeni Plushenko has won four Olympic medals, which, at the time, tied with Gillis Grafström's record for most Olympic medals in figure skating. Plushenko is known for his dynamic performances, and technical advancement of the sport.

Plushenko is the first male skater to perform the Biellmann spin in the senior competitions. At the 1999 NHK Trophy, he became the first skater to perform a 4T–3T–2Lo combination in competition. He has since landed the combination 26 times. Plushenko is also the first to land 4T–3T–3Lo and 3A-1Lo-3F in competition. He first landed the combination at the 2002 Cup of Russia and has since landed it four times. He is the first skater to complete the 3A-3F combination.

Plushenko is also the first to perform a 3T–3T–3Lo–2Lo combination, which he first did at the 2001 ARD Gala. At the 2006 Russian Championships, he landed a six jump combination (3T–3T–2Lo–2Lo–2Lo–2Lo) in his exhibition program. He performed a 3A-3T-3Lo combination at the exhibition finale of the 2006 Winter Olympics.

Plushenko has consistently landed 4T in competitions and landed a 4S in Samara, Russia during the 2004 Russian Cup series. It is estimated that he has landed a total of about 100 quads in competition.

Plushenko has worked on and landed 4Lo and 4Lz in practice, but has never completed any of them in competition. He has also worked on a 3A-4T combination.

At the age of 16, Plushenko became the youngest male skater to ever receive a perfect score of 6.0. He received a total of seventy five 6.0's before the new Code of Points judging system was introduced. Under the Code of Points system, he has set 13 world record scores (5 in the short program, 4 in free skating, and 4 in the combined total).

=== List of Plushenko's world record scores ===
Plushenko has broken 13 world records in his career:

Combined total records
Date	Score	Event	Note
16 February 2006	258.33	2006 Winter Olympics	The record was broken by Daisuke Takahashi on 15 February 2008.
18 December 2004	251.75	2004–05 Grand Prix Final	Plushenko became the first skater to score above 250 points.
15 November 2003	234.29	2003 Trophée Lalique	
1 November 2003	233.65	2003 Skate Canada International	Plushenko became the first skater to score above 230 points.
Short program records
Date	Score	Event	Note
20 January 2010	91.30	2010 European Championships	The record was broken by Patrick Chan on 27 April 2011.
14 February 2006	90.66	2006 Winter Olympics	Plushenko became the first skater to score above 90 points in short program.
25 November 2005	87.20	2005 Cup of Russia	
17 December 2004	84.35	2004–05 Grand Prix Final	
30 October 2003	81.25	2003 Skate Canada International	Plushenko became the first skater to score above 80 points in short program.
Free skating records
Date	Score	Event	Note
16 February 2006	167.67	2006 Winter Olympics	The record was broken by Daisuke Takahashi on 15 February 2008.
18 December 2004	167.40	2004–05 Grand Prix Final	Plushenko became the first skater to score above 160 points in free skating.
15 November 2003	158.94	2003 Trophée Lalique	
1 November 2003	152.40	2003 Skate Canada International	Plushenko became the first skater to score above 150 points in free skating.

== Advancement of skating competition ==
Plushenko has taken a strong position opposing the current official ban on quad jumps in the women's short program stating: “When Usain Bolt runs faster than everyone else, should he run with weights? Why should ladies skating be held back? It is not fair to them. There should be equality”, referring to men not being restricted as to the use of quad jumps in competition. Plushenko has advocated the position that both men and women should be equally allowed to use the quad jump in skating competition without gender discrimination.

== Political career ==
In 2006, Plushenko joined the political party A Just Russia, and in March 2007, he was elected to the Legislative Assembly of Saint Petersburg. Following the 2010 Olympics, he announced his intention to quit politics. In April 2010, he gained public attention for poor attendance, having attended only 11 of 123 parliamentary sessions since his election. In December 2011, he announced he was leaving politics to train for the 2014 Olympics. He quit A Just Russia and said he had no plans to join another political party.

== Personal life ==
On 18 June 2005, Plushenko married Maria Ermak, a sociology student at the Saint Petersburg State University, in a ceremony at the Hotel Astoria in Saint Petersburg. Their son, Egor Evgenievich (originally Kristian), was born on 15 June 2006. In February 2008, they were officially divorced. In August 2009, Plushenko announced his engagement to Yana Rudkovskaya, the record producer for Russian singer Dima Bilan. They were married on 12 September 2009. Their first son, Alexander, was born in January 2013 with their second, Arseniy, born in September 2020.

In March 2022, Plushenko published an Instagram video in which he endorsed Russia's full-scale invasion of Ukraine and called it an "unavoidable special operation". In December 2022, the Ukrainian Parliament sanctioned Plushenko for his support of the war.

== Programs ==
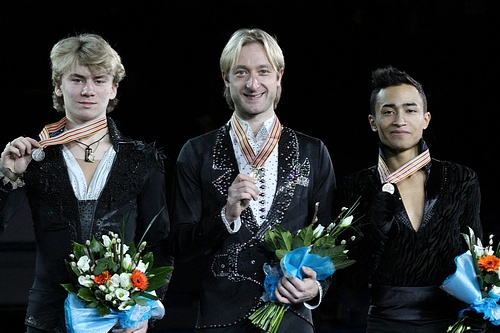
The men's podium at the 2012 European Championships medal ceremony

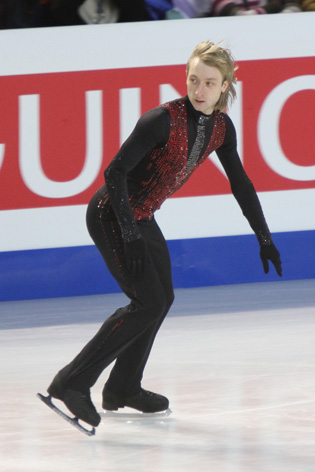
Plushenko at the 2010 European Championships

=== Post-2017 ===
Season	Exhibition
2017–2018	Tango Amore by Edvin Marton; Tribute to Vaslav Nijinsky

=== Pre-2017 ===
Season	Short program	Free skating	Exhibition
2015–2016	Not shown in competition: Carmina Burana by Carl Orff		
2014–2015	Did not compete this season		Carmina Burana by Carl Orff
2013–2014	El Tango de Roxanne (from Moulin Rouge) performed by Mariano Mores arranged by Edvin Marton choreo. by Maxim Staviski and David Avdish; The Girl Like You (from We Are The Future) by Okean Elzy choreo. by Maxim Staviski and David Avdish	The Best of Plushenko: Bandit Petersburg by Igor Kornelyuk; The Godfather by Nino Rota; Scheherazade by Nikolai Rimsky-Korsakov; Tango Amore by Edvin Marton; Tosca by Giacomo Puccini; Adagio in G minor by Remo Giazotto and Tomaso Albinoni arranged by Edvin Marton choreo. by Maxim Staviski and David Avdish	
2012–2013	Storm by Yanni arranged by Edvin Marton choreo. by David Avdish	Introduction and Rondo Capriccioso; The Swan; Danse macabre by Camille Saint-Saëns choreo. by David Avdish	
2011–2012	Storm by Yanni arranged by Edvin Marton choreo. by David Avdish	El Tango de Roxanne (from Moulin Rouge) performed by Mariano Mores arranged by Edvin Marton choreo. by David Avdish	Je suis malade by Alice Dona and Serge Lama
2010–2011	Did not compete this season		
2009–2010	Concierto de Aranjuez by Joaquín Rodrigo arranged by Edvin Marton choreo. by David Avdish	Tango Amore by Edvin Marton choreo. by David Avdish	Svetcha by Mashina Vremeni; Je suis malade by Alice Dona and Serge Lama
2008–2009 2007–2008 2006–2007	Did not compete these seasons		
2005–2006	Tosca by Giacomo Puccini choreo. by David Avdish, Yuri Smekalov, and Edvard Smirnov; Once Upon a Time in Mexico by Robert Rodriguez choreo. by David Avdish, Yuri Smekalov, and Edvard Smirnov	The Godfather by Nino Rota performed and arranged by Edvin Marton choreo. by David Avdish, Yuri Smekalov, and Edvard Smirnov	Tosca by Giacomo Puccini choreo. by David Avdish, Yuri Smekalov, and Edvard Smirnov; Caruso by Lucio Dalla performed by Luciano Pavarotti; Sex Bomb by Tom Jones and Mousse T.
2004–2005	Moonlight Sonata by Ludwig van Beethoven performed by Victor Zinchuk choreo. by Sergei Petukhov and Edvard Smirnov	The Godfather by Nino Rota performed and arranged by Edvin Marton choreo. by David Avdish, Yuri Smekalov, and Edvard Smirnov	The Godfather by Nino Rota performed and arranged by Edvin Marton choreo. by Sergei Petukhov and Edvard Smirnov
2003–2004	Tango Flamenco by Paco de Lucía; Nyah by Hans Zimmer	Tribute to Vaslav Nijinsky; Scheherazade by Nikolai Rimsky-Korsakov; Art on Ice; Magic Stradivarius; King of the Forest by Edvin Marton	Logical Song by Supertramp; Symphony No.5 by Ludwig van Beethoven; Hafanana by Afric Simone; Asissai from an original performance of Slava Polunin
2002–2003	Adagio by Tomaso Albinoni, Remo Giazotto	Criminal St. Petersburg by Igor Kornelyuk	Carmen Suite by Georges Bizet, Rodion Shchedrin; Only You by The Platters; "Long Tall Sally" by Little Richard; Town which doesn't exist by Igor Kornelyuk
2001–2002	Earth Song; Childhood; Billie Jean; They Don't Care About Us by Michael Jackson	Carmen Suite by Georges Bizet, Rodion Shchedrin; Fixe; Eclipse by Cirque du Soleil; El Tango de Roxanne (from Moulin Rouge!) by Mariano Mores; La Petite Fille de la Mer by Vangelis	Carmen Suite by Georges Bizet, Rodion Shchedrin; Sex Bomb by Tom Jones, Mousse T.
2000–2001	Boléro by Maurice Ravel	Xotica by Rene Dupere; Tango from Hasta que te Conoci by Raúl Di Blasio; Childhood Poverty (Pan Flute) (from Once Upon a Time in America) by Ennio Morricone; The Mooche by Duke Ellington; Flawless Victory (from Mortal Kombat) by George S. Clinton	Sex Bomb by Tom Jones, Mousse T.; Pasadena: Maywood
1999–2000	Sabre Dance by Aram Khachaturian	Dark Eyes (Russian folk song); Coachmen Don't Drive the Horse; Concierto Madrigal for Two Guitars by Joaquín Rodrigo	Two Step Nadya Russian folk music; Ciocarlia Romanian folk music
1998–1999	Hava Nagila by various artists	Chronologie 2, 3; Zoolookologie by Jean-Michel Jarre	Two Step Nadya Russian folk music; Ciocarlia Romanian folk music
1997–1998	Pasodoble; Concierto de Aranjuez; El Gato Montes by Joaquín Rodrigo	Chronologie 2, 3; Zoolookologie by Jean-Michel Jarre	Enigma by Jean-Michel Jarre; Two Step Nadya Russian folk music; Ciocarlia Romanian folk music
1996–1997	Tarantella by Witold Lutosławski; Santa Lucia by Luigi Gordigiani	William Tell Overture; The Barber of Seville by Gioachino Rossini	
1995–1996		Don Quixote by Ludwig Minkus	

== Competitive highlights ==
GP: Champions Series / Grand Prix

International
Event	95–96	96–97	97–98	98–99	99–00	00–01	01–02	02–03	03–04	04–05	05–06	06–07	07–08	08–09	09–10	10–11	11–12	12–13	13–14
Olympics							2nd				1st				2nd				WD
Worlds			3rd	2nd	4th	1st		1st	1st	WD									
Europeans			2nd	2nd	1st	1st		1st	2nd	1st	1st				1st		1st	WD	
GP Final			5th	3rd	1st	1st	2nd	1st	2nd	1st									
GP Cup of Russia		4th	2nd	2nd	1st	1st	1st	1st	1st	1st	1st				1st				WD
GP Lalique									1st										
GP NHK Trophy				1st	1st	1st													
GP Skate America			2nd																
GP Skate Canada				1st					1st										
GP Spark./Bofrost					1st	1st	1st	1st											
Goodwill Games				3rd			1st												
Volvo Open Cup																			1st
Finlandia Trophy		7th	3rd			1st													
Campbell's								2nd	1st										
International: Junior
Junior Worlds	6th	1st																	
Blue Swords		1st J																	
EYOF		1st J																	
National
Russian Champ.	6th	4th	3rd	1st	1st	1st	1st		1st	1st	1st				1st		1st	1st	2nd
Team events
Olympics																			1st T
Japan Open																3rd T 3rd P		3rd T 4th P	
J = Junior level; WD = Withdrew; T = Team result; P = Personal result; Medals awarded for team result only. Plushenko did not compete in the 2006–2007, 2007–2008, and 2008–2009 seasons.

== Detailed results ==
Small medals for short program and free skating awarded only at ISU Championships. At team events, medals awarded for team results only.

- **^team event** – This is a team event, medals are awarded for the team results only.
- **^T** – team placement
- ^? – dates of competition, not event
- **^TFP** – Total Factored Placements
- World records highlighted in **bold and italic**

2013–14 season
Date	Event	notes	SP	FS	Total	Ref
6–9 February 2014	2014 Winter Olympics	^{team event}	2; 91.39	1; 168.20	1^{T}	
24–25 December 2013	2014 Russian Championships		1; 98.41	2; 162.96	2; 261.37	
7–8 November 2013	22nd Volvo Open Cup		1; 82.34	1; 180.91	1; 263.25	
2012–13 season
Date	Event	notes	SP	FS	Total	Ref
25–26 December 2012	2013 Russian Championships		1; 91.68	1; 174.26	1; 265.94	
6 October 2012	2012 Japan Open	^{team event}	–	4; 156.21	3^{T}	
2011–12 season
Date	Event	PR	SP	FS	Total	Ref
23–28 January 2012	2012 European Championships	1; 157.52	2; 84.71	1; 176.52	1; 261.23	
25–26 December 2011	2012 Russian Championships		1; 88.24	1; 171.43	1; 259.67	
2010–11 season
Date	Event	notes	SP	FS	Total	Ref
2 October 2010	2010 Japan Open	^{team event}	–	3; 151.00	3^{T}	
2009–10 season
Date	Event	notes	SP	FS	Total	Ref
16–18 February 2010	2010 Winter Olympics		1; 90.85	2; 165.51	2; 256.36	
20–21 January 2010	2010 European Championships		1; **91.30**	1; 164.09	1; 255.39	
24–26 December 2009	2010 Russian Championships		1; 100.09	1; 171.50	1; 271.59	
23–24 October 2009	2009 Cup of Russia		1; 82.25	1; 158.40	1; 240.65	
2005–06 season
Date	Event	notes	SP	FS	Total	Ref
14–16 February 2006	2006 Winter Olympics		1; **90.66**	1; **167.67**	1; **258.33**	
20–21 January 2006	2006 European Championships		1; 82.80	1; 162.53	1; 245.33	
25–29^{?} December 2005	2006 Russian Championships		1	1	1; 1.5^{TFP}	
25–26 November 2005	2005 Cup of Russia		1; **87.20**	1; 154.60	1; 241.80	
2004–05 season
Date	Event	PR	SP	FS	Total	Ref
14–20 March 2005	2005 World Championships	1; 37.98	5; 73.28	WD	–	
25–30 January 2005	2005 European Championships		2; 75.33	1; 151.81	1; 227.14	
5–8 January 2005	2005 Russian Championships		1	1	1; 1.5^{TFP}	
16–19 December 2004	2004–05 Grand Prix Final		1; **84.35**	1; **167.40**	1; **251.75**	
25–28 November 2004	2004 Cup of Russia		1; 74.95	1; 158.50	1; 233.45	
2003–04 season
Date	Event	PR	SP	FS	Total	Ref
22–28 March 2004	2004 World Championships	1	1	1	1; 2.0^{TFP}	
2–8 February 2004	2004 European Championships	1	1	2	2; 3.0^{TFP}	
5–8 January 2004	2004 Russian Championships		1	1	1; 1.5^{TFP}	
11–14 December 2003	2003–04 Grand Prix Final		1; 78.25	2; 146.94	2; 225.19	
20–23 November 2003	2003 Cup of Russia		1; 80.35	1; 150.90	1; 231.25	
13–16 November 2003	2003 Trophée Lalique		1; 75.35	1; **158.94**	1; **234.29**	
30 October – 3 November 2003	2003 Skate Canada International		1; **81.25**	1; **152.40**	1; **233.65**	
