= Je suis malade =

Je suis malade may refer to:

- "Je suis malade" (song), a song by Dalida.
- Je suis malade (album), an album by Serge Lama.
