= Mining industry of Russia =

The mineral industry of Russia is one of the world's leading mineral industries and accounts for a large percentage of the Commonwealth of Independent States' production of a range of mineral products, including metals, industrial minerals, and mineral fuels. In 2005, Russia ranked among the leading world producers or was a significant producer of a vast range of mineral commodities, including aluminum, arsenic, cement, copper, magnesium compounds and metals, nitrogen, palladium, silicon, nickel and vanadium.

In 2005, the Russian economy benefited significantly from high oil, gas, and metal prices. Oil revenues accounted for about 14% of the gross domestic product. Following the mineral fuel industry, the next leading branch of the mineral industry, in terms of its contribution to the national economy was the metallurgical sector, which contributed 19% of the value of industrial production, accounted for 11.1% of the value of an industrial capital stock, and employed 9.3% of the industrial labor force. In 2005, a total of 1,071,000 people were employed in the mineral extraction sector and made up 1.6% of the country's labor force. Investment in mineral extraction and metallurgy accounted for about 20% of total investment in the Russian economy.

In 2019, the country was the second worldwide producer of platinum, vanadium and cobalt; third world producer of gold, nickel and sulfur; fourth worldwide producer of silver and phosphate; fifth largest world producer of iron ore; sixth largest producer of lead; seventh largest world producer of boron; eighth largest world producer of gypsum; ninth largest producer of copper, molybdenum and bauxite; 10th largest world producer of zinc; 13th largest world producer of tin; in addition to being the world's 10th largest producer of table salt. It was the world's sixth-largest producer of uranium in 2018.

== Legal framework ==
A new subsoil law was under discussion as of 2005. The previous law of 1992, as amended, does not impose any special restrictions on companies with foreign participation, with the exception of diamond and radioactive materials, but this appeared likely to change to the disadvantage of foreign companies, especially those interested in investing in large or strategic deposits, such as the Udokan copper deposit or the Sukhoi Log gold deposit.

== Production ==
In 2005, the value of mining and quarrying production, including extraction of mineral fuels, increased by 1.3% compared with that of 2004; when mineral fuels are excluded, it fell by 3.2%.

== Structure ==
Production in the mineral sector was highly concentrated as of 2005. For more than 10 minerals, the majority of production was conducted by one company. Gazprom controlled almost the entire production of natural gas in Russia, Norilsk Nickel Mining and Metallurgical Company (MMC) produced more than 90% of Russian nickel and platinum-group metals (PGM), and ALROSA Company Ltd. produced almost all the country's diamond. The Ministry of Natural Resources reported that the copper and other mineral industries also are highly concentrated, but that the situation is better for coal and alluvial gold. Despite this concentration, Russian metallurgical and mining companies were medium-sized compared with those in other countries; in the steel sector, Russian producers are generally smaller than their international counterparts.

=== Sanctions ===
Following the 2022 Russian invasion of Ukraine sanctions have been placed on mining and related businesses including and EU ban on Russian gold in August 2022, with the Russian Copper Co, Highland Gold Mining Ltd and Chukotka Mining Geological Company, sanctioned by the US Office of Foreign Assets Control and the G7 and EU sanction over Russian diamonds in December 2023.

== Mineral resources ==
Approximately 20,000 Russian mineral deposits have been explored, and more than one-third of these have been mined. The Ministry of Natural Resources cited serious problems in the sector, which included the depletion of reserves and the low discovery rate of new reserves. The system of reporting reserves in the Soviet Union (and which Russia very often employed for its resource reporting) was based on establishing drilling parameters to ascertain the certainty of reserves. Unlike the method used in market economy countries, this method does not include the use of market-based economic criteria to establish the feasibility of developing these resources using current technology at prevailing market conditions. Thus, reserve data based on the Soviet method cannot be compared to market economy definitions of reserves. Furthermore, Soviet data on reserves for many mineral resources was either kept secret or was difficult to obtain, and the same holds true for Russian mineral resource data. By 2005, however, Russian companies had begun to seek exposure to Western markets and stock exchanges to raise money in larger quantities and more cheaply than in Russia. A number of state secrecy laws were repealed, which has led some Russian companies to start reporting their reserves and resources according to the Australasian Joint Ore Reserves Committee (JORC) code of the Australasian Institute of Mining and Metallurgy.

=== Metals ===
==== Aluminium ====
RUSAL was Russia's leading domestic aluminum producing company and, along with SUAL, which was the second ranked domestic aluminum producer and the leading domestic bauxite producer, controlled all Russian aluminum, alumina, and bauxite production enterprises. Plans for RUSAL called for merging its resources with that of SUAL and with Swiss-based Glencore International AG to become the United Company RUSAL. This merger would start a new stage in the development of RUSAL and make it the global leader in aluminum production.

RUSAL was investing to expand and modernize its production facilities. It was engaged in commissioning the Khakas Aluminum Smelter with a capacity of 300,000 t/yr. Plans for RUSAL also called for modernizing the Sayanogorsk aluminum smelter in 2006 to increase output of aluminum and alloys and to modernize the Mykolaiv Alumina refinery in Ukraine to increase output to 1.6 Mt/yr of alumina. RUSAL also planned to continue to expand production capacity at the Achinsk alumina refinery, increasing its output to 1.1 Mt/yr of alumina. Included in the company's investment project portfolio is the Komi Aluminum project, which was initiated by SUAL. The project foresees the development, construction, and operation of a bauxite-alumina complex in the Komi Republic, using material from the Middle Timan bauxite deposit. The design capacity of the complex was 6 Mt/yr of bauxite and 1.4 Mt/yr of alumina. The completion of this project would considerably reduce the Russian aluminum industry's dependence on foreign countries for raw material supplies.

==== Copper ====
More than 51% of Russia's copper metal production was produced by Norilsk Nickel from ore mined by the company. The remainder came from a much smaller amount of ore mined in the Ural Mountains and a large amount of secondary material. As nickel-rich ores at Norilsk Nickel become depleted, Norilsk Nickel will switch to mining larger quantities of ores, which will be primarily copper-rich ores that have a higher copper content relative to their nickel content than the nickel-rich ores, but are lower in metal content for both metals. This change could increase copper output as Norilsk Nickel tries to maintain its level of nickel production. Norilsk Nickel's strategy up to 2010, however, appears to be to maintain its production of nickel-rich ores which may delay the significant increase in copper production.

The leading copper producer in the Ural Mountain region—the Ural Mining and Metallurgical Company (UMMC)—controls a large number of mining and metallurgical enterprises in the Urals. The company was planning to develop its raw material base and to increase its output of copper in concentrate to 105,000 t in 2010 from 72,000 t in 2003. Mine output in the Urals would also expand as mine development takes place at the Russian Copper Company Limited, which was the country's third ranked copper producer and which also controlled mining and metallurgical enterprises in the Ural Mountain region. Development of the large Udokan deposit in Chita oblast was still on hold. Reserves at Udokan and neighboring deposits were reported as ranging from 10 to more than 20 Mt of copper in ore at grades of between 0.7% and 4% copper.

==== Gold ====
Russia was having a difficult time expanding gold production because reserves at existing enterprises were being depleted and gold mining companies were experiencing greater difficulties in obtaining licenses to mine new deposits. Formerly, local Government entities could issue such licenses, but in 2005, these licenses could be obtained only through the Russian Ministry of Natural Resources based in Moscow. Placers contain 18.2% of the country's reserves but they were being significantly depleted, and most existing placer mining operations were unlikely to survive beyond 2011. However, placers still contributed nearly 50% of annual production. In 2005, no new gold deposits were put into production.

More than one-half of Russia's hard rock gold resources occur in the Maiskoye, Natalkinskoe, Nezhdaninskoe, Olimpiada, and the Sukhoi Log deposits in Siberia and in the Russian Far East. More than 66% of Russian gold production comes from just six eastern regions (Amur, Irkutsk, Khabarovsk, Krasnoyarsk, Magadan, and Sakha-Yakutia). During the past 4 years, foreign companies have controlled 15% to 18% of Russian gold production, which was the largest share held for any commodity in the Russian mining industry. These foreign-held enterprises produced a total of between 30 and 36 t/yr of gold. Among Russia's leading gold producers, Bema Gold Corp., Highland Gold Mining Ltd., High River Gold Mines, Kinross Gold Corp., and Peter Hambro Mining Plc, were foreign-listed and/or foreign-controlled companies. Projects being developed by these foreign firms were expected to contribute significantly to the growth in Russian gold production in the next 5 years and could increase Russia's gold output to about 250 t/yr if they are all successfully developed. The most advanced international gold project was the Bema Gold Corp.’s development of the Kupol deposit, where production was scheduled to start in 2008. Significant byproduct gold was produced by mining operations of UMMC in the Ural Mountain region and Norilsk Nickel's operations in East Siberia on the Taimyr Peninsula (165,000 ounces in 2005).

==== Iron and steel ====
Russia is the world's fourth-ranked steel producer after China, Japan, and the United States. Russia shares the lead with Japan as the world's leading steel exporter. From 1998 to 2005, Russian steel production increased by more than 50%. Between 1998 and 2005, investment in the steel sector greatly increased, which improved economic indicators for steel enterprises and enabled them to improve product quality. Nevertheless, the steel sector was still in need of investment to improve its ability to compete and to expand production capacity. According to a Russian analysis, the country's steel mills can be divided into three categories based on the level of technology they employ. The mills in the first category are the country's three largest (Magnitogorsk, Severstal, and Novolipetsk), which also have the highest levels of technology. For example, this first group of mills has the lowest percentage of open-hearth production, the highest level of continuous casting, and produces the highest quality assortment of steel products. The second tier steel mills consist of the Chelyabinsk, the Nizhniy Tagil, the Kuznetsk, the Oskol, the Uralsk, and West Siberian mills. The country's leading steel holding company was Evraz (a Luxembourg-registered steel company) that had holdings that include three of the leading steel mills in Russia (Kuznetsk, Nizhniy Tagil, and West Siberian). Russia's third ranked steel producer, Severstal, was discussing a merger with Arcelor of Luxembourg, in part to thwart a hostile takeover bid for Arcelor by Mittal Steel of India, which was consolidating steel mills worldwide.

==== Iron ore ====
Russian steel companies relied on iron ore from domestic deposits. These deposits often were owned by more than one Russian steel company. In 2005, steel companies were acquiring iron ore producers to help make their companies more vertically integrated. Russia's iron ore mines and iron and steel works often were located far apart. Almost 60% of iron ore reserves are located in the Kursk magnetic anomaly (KMA) in European Russia and about 15% are located in the Ural Mountains region. High-grade reserves at the open pit operations in the KMA were becoming depleted, although the area hosts significant lower grade resources in the weathered zones. These zones were estimated to contain 4 Gt of reserves and up to 60 Gt of potential resources, but exploiting such low-grade ores would require expensive beneficiation technology.

Iron ore output was expected to be in the range of 100 to 105 Mt/yr by 2010. A further limited increase in iron ore production was projected to the year 2020 without a significant expansion of the resource base. The resource base for iron ore was not considered very attractive for investment because of the low grade of the ores, technological problems related to mining and processing the ores, and taxation issues.

==== Nickel ====
In Russia, which was the world's leading nickel producing country, more than 90% of nickel was produced by Norilsk Nickel, which mined deposits of mixed sulfide ores mainly near Norilsk in East Siberia, but also on the Kola Peninsula. The projected long-term ore output for Norilsk Nickel in 2005 was raised to 22 Mt/yr. The 2005 level of production was 14 Mt of ore. With metal prices and demand at very high levels, the new higher projections were in accord with Norilsk Nickel's marketing strategy. To maintain and increase output levels, Norilsk Nickel was planning to switch to mining a greater proportion of cuprous and disseminated ores rather than nickel-rich ores, which were being depleted. Norilsk Nickel also was developing new mines to replace depleted reserves of nickel-rich ore. The company's cuprous ore reserves, which are abundant, have a much lower nickel content and a somewhat lower copper content, and the disseminated ores are lower in all base-metals content than the nickel-rich ores. The nickel-rich, cuprous, and disseminated ores, however, are not greatly dissimilar in their PGM content.

The Skalisty Mine, which is located on the Taimyr Peninsula, was under development as of 2005; it was expected to achieve its design capacity of 1.2 Mt/yr of nickel-rich ore in 6 to 7 years. Skalisty was scheduled to produce 310,000 t of ore in 2004. Development of the Gluboky Mine, which is located on the Taymyr Peninsula, was in the planning stage; the mine was scheduled to come onstream to mine nickel-rich ore by 2013–14. Gluboky and Skalisty would produce a combined 2 Mt/yr of nickel-rich ore.

Despite its development plans, obstacles were preventing Norilsk Nickel from making major investments in developing its facilities. The investment in its nickel operations that was planned for the period up to 2010 would result in only modest increases in production, although a significant reduction in production would be averted.

A large quantity of sulphide nickel has been discovered by Amur Minerals Corporation in the far east of Russia. The company's principal asset is the Kun-Manie project located in Amur Oblast, with JORC resources in excess of an 830,000 nickel equivalent tonnes and a positive independently compiled prefeasibility study.

==== Platinum-group metals ====
Norilsk Nickel's operations (located mainly on the Taymyr Peninsula) in East Siberia and also on the Kola Peninsula produce more than 90% of the country's PGM output. About 10 t/yr of PGM consisting almost entirely of platinum was mined from alluvial deposits throughout the country.

In 2004, Russia repealed the law that kept PGM production data secret and, in 2005, repealed the law that kept PGM reserve data secret. The Government published reserve figures for its major PGM holdings at the Norilsk Nickel complex in 2005. Based on an independent audit carried out by Micon International Co. Ltd. according to the Australian Joint Ore Reserves Committee (JORC) Code, Norilsk Nickel's reserves of combined proven and probable reserves of all six platinum group elements (iridium, osmium, palladium, platinum, rhodium and ruthenium) at Norilsk Nickel's holdings in East Siberia as of December 31, 2004, were reported to be 81.791 million troy ounces. Proven and probable reserves were reported to be 62.183 million troy ounces of palladium and 15.993 million troy ounces of platinum with ore grades that ranged from 5.5 grams per metric ton (g/t) to 11.1 g/t. Measured and indicated mineral resources were reported to be an additional 141 million troy ounces of palladium and 40 million troy ounces of platinum. These reserves are adequate for Norilsk Nickel to maintain current levels of palladium and platinum production for more than 20 years.

Despite Norilsk Nickel's development plan to significantly increase ore extraction, the company was proceeding more slowly than its stated plans would indicate and it appeared that through 2010, Norilsk Nickel would try to keep output levels at about the 2005 level.

==== Tin ====
Tin production was prevalent during the Soviet period with the USSR being the fourth largest producer of tin. Ore was mined in Solnechny District of Khabarovsk Krai (Solnechny GOK), the extreme north of Yakutia (Deputatskoye Mine) and Chukotka (Iyultin Mine), Jewish Autonomous Region (Khinganskoye Mine) and in Primoroye (Iskra). During the post perestroika years tin production waned leading to bankruptcies and closures of virtually all operations.

Revival began around 2012 when the Sobolinoye Deposit, (Sable Tin Deposit) was acquired by Sable Tin Resources at a State Auction. The Far Eastern Tin company has recommissioned the Gorniy processing plant and started operations in 2016 at Festivalnoye mine. Khingan Resources are seeking to initiate the processing of tailings at the Khinganskoye Mine in the Jewish Autonomous Republic. Pravoumirskoye Lts has initiated production at the high grade Pravoumisrkoye Mine in Khabarovsk region despite the serious infrastructure issues.

Additional supply is expected from the Sable Deposit which was explored in Soviet times, and despite receiving technical economic conditions in 1993 from Gipronickel (Norilsk Nickel Subsidiary) was never developed. Over 90000 tonnes of tin and 53000 tonnes of copper are expected to be extracted from the high grade property near Solnechny town in Khabarovsk Krai.

=== Industrial minerals ===
==== Diamond ====
ALROSA accounted for 97% of Russian diamond production and about 25% of world rough diamond production in 2005. Its major mining operations were located in the Sakha Yakutia Republic but, in 2005, the company began production at the Lomonosov diamond deposit in the northern European part of the country in Arkhangelsk oblast. The company had five mining and beneficiation enterprises in Sakha Yakutia—the Aykhal, the Anabar, the Mirnyy, the Nyuruba, and the Udachnyy.

In 2005, ALROSA was able to maintain its level of mine output through its program of gradually switching to underground mining to extract low-grade diamond ore reserves. ALROSA had started underground operations at the No. 7/8 Block of the Internatsiolnal’nyy underground mine and was continuing construction of underground mining at the Mir and the Udachny Mines. To maintain stable operations, ALROSA would need to increase its ore reserves by carrying out intensive prospecting for new diamond deposits. The company planned to increase its investment in exploration significantly. A new Mirny Exploration Expedition was established to concentrate on exploration.

On June 28, 2005, full-scale mining was initiated at ALROSA's Lomonosov Division OAO Severalamz in the Arkhangelsk region with the commissioning of ore treatment plant No. 1 at the Lomonosov deposit. The plant was designed with the capacity to process about 1 Mt/yr of ore. Diamonds from the deposit are of gem quality, which accounted for the high appraisal value of the reserves at $12 billion. The diamond deposit's effective life was estimated to be about 50 years from the time the plant was put into operation.

The OJSC Apatit enterprise, which is located on the Kola Peninsula, was the leading producer of apatite concentrate in Russia and one of the world's leading suppliers of phosphate raw material; its core activities were the mining and beneficiation of apatite and nepheline-syenite ores at 10 deposits that have estimated combined reserves of 3.5 Gt. The development plan for Apatit to 2015 assumes an optimal level of apatite concentrate production of 8.5 Mt/yr that would require levels of ore extraction of 27 to 28 Mt/yr. To maintain output, the enterprise would need to develop underground mining significantly. In 2001, the percentage of ore mined underground was 38%; by 2015, this percentage was expected to increase to 75%. Investment to renovate the beneficiation complex, reduce energy expenditures, reduce emissions harmful to the environment, and acquire new equipment to improve labor productivity was also needed.

In late 2016, ALROSA announced that the Mir mine in Siberia had reached full projected capacity and was expected to produce over $400 million worth of diamonds per year.

==== Phosphate rock ====
The OJSC Apatit enterprise, which is located on the Kola Peninsula, was the leading producer of apatite concentrate in Russia and one of the world's leading suppliers of phosphate raw material; its core activities were the mining and beneficiation of apatite and nepheline-syenite ores at 10 deposits that have estimated combined reserves of 3.5 Gt. The development plan for Apatit to 2015 assumes an optimal level of apatite concentrate production of 8.5 Mt/yr that would require levels of ore extraction of 27 to 28 Mt/yr. To maintain output, the enterprise would need to develop underground mining significantly. In 2001, the percentage of ore mined underground was 38%; by 2015, this percentage was expected to increase to 75%. Investment to renovate the beneficiation complex, reduce energy expenditures, reduce emissions harmful to the environment, and acquire new equipment to improve labor productivity was also needed.

=== Mineral fuels and related materials ===
Projections of Russia's fuel production are based on the country's Energy Strategy for Russia for the Period up to 2020 issued in 2003 by the Ministry of Energy of the Russian Federation. This strategy envisions three potential scenarios: optimistic, moderate, and critical. The optimistic scenario is characterized by the growth of GDP at the rate of 4.7% to 5.2% annually, by a sevenfold increase of investment in fixed capital for this period compared with the 2000 level, and by high world prices for oil and gas. The oil prices envisioned by this strategy in 2003, even for the optimistic scenario, were about one-half of the 2005 oil prices. The moderate scenario is characterized by a GDP growth of 3.3% to 3.4% annually to 2020, an increase of investment in fixed capital by 3.6 times, and fixed prices for oil at a little more than one-half of the optimistic scenario and gas prices about 20% lower than in the optimistic scenario. The critical scenario is characterized primarily by low world oil prices.

==== Coal ====
The Energy Strategy for Russia for the Period up to 2020 foresees the need for coal production to increase to between 310 and 330 Mt by 2010 and to between 375 and 430 Mt by 2020 to meet expected domestic demand. Russia has 22 coal basins with 114 coal deposits that are unevenly distributed across the country. In 2005, the country had 241 operating coal mines, which included 104 underground mines and 137 open pits with a total production capacity of 315 Mt/yr. Total coal reserves registered in the State Register of Reserves were estimated to be about 200 Gt, and registered reserves in the explored categories A+B+C1 in the reserve classification system that was used in the Soviet Union and later Russia were reported as 106 Gt. These include coal reserves in operating coal mines, in mines under construction, and in areas explored in detail for new mine construction. As foreseen in the country's energy strategy program, coal production must increase by 10 to 15 Mt/yr between 2005 and 2010 and by a total of 105 Mt by the year 2020. Although the creation of additional coal production capacity through upgrading and expansion of existing mines and development of new mines was possible based on reserves, doing so would require a level of investment in the coal sector far in excess of the historic level of investment in the past 5 years and casts doubt on the feasibility of the planned expansion. At current rates of investment coal production capacity by the year 2020 would be in the neighborhood of 375 Mt/yr. This optimistic investment scenario would depend to a large extent on an increase in foreign investment, particularly from Chinese, Japanese, and South Korean companies.

==== Natural gas ====
The country's energy strategy predicts natural gas production to range between 635 and 665 billion cubic meters in 2010 and between 680 and 730 billion cubic meters in 2020. These gas production goals were to be achieved by development in the traditional gas-producing regions, the main one of which was West Siberia, and in the new oil- and gas-producing provinces in East Siberia, in the Russian Far East, in the European North including offshore in the Arctic Sea, and on the Yamal Peninsula. Along with the development of big fields, the strategy recommends development of small gas fields, primarily in the European part of the country in the Ural Mountains, the Volga, and the North West regions.

Almost all the country's gas production was under the control of the company Gazprom. Gazprom's natural gas production forecast called for only modest production growth of about 1.3% by 2008. Growth in Russia's natural gas sector has been slowed primarily by aging fields, state regulation, Gazprom's monopolistic control over the industry, and insufficient export pipelines. Three major fields in Western Siberia—Medvezh’ye, Urengoy, and Yamburg—accounted for more than 70% of Gazprom's total natural gas production, but these fields were in decline. Although Gazprom projected increases in its natural gas output between 2008 and 2030, most of Russia's natural gas production growth was expected to come from independent gas companies, such as Itera, Northgas, and Novatek.

Reassessment of the energy strategy has been ongoing since the strategy was issued in 2003. A Gazprom subsidiary issued a report recommending a change of export strategy for the Russian gas industry. It determined that Russia should decrease exports of natural gas to European markets and concentrate instead on developing new gasfields to keep up with domestic demand, which was rising faster than was envisioned in the 2003 report and could necessitate the development of new gasfields on the Yamal Peninsula and in other places.

==== Petroleum ====
The Energy Strategy for Russia for the Period up to 2020 includes several scenarios that predict a range for Russian oil production of between 445 and 490 Mt/yr by 2010 and between 450 and 520 Mt/yr in 2020. Oil production and growth was to be centered in the traditional oil-producing regions, such as in West Siberia, the North Caucasus, and the Volga region and in new oil and gas Provinces in the European North (Timan-Pechora region), in eastern Siberia and the Russian Far East, and in the south in the North Caspian region. Although the base of the country's oil production for this period would remain the West Siberian oil and gas province, priority areas for new development were to be in the eastern and the southern regions of the country. New field developments were likely to produce almost all Russia's annual oil growth in the next 5 years and would likely produce more than one-half of the country's oil in 2020. In the next 5 years, new field developments at the Middle Caspian project at Kurmangazy (OAO Lukoil Oil Co.); the Komsomolskoye and the Vankorskoye projects (OAO Rosneft Oil Co.); the Prirazlomnoye project (Gazprom); the Sakhalin Island projects; the West Salymskoye project (Shell Joint Venture); and the Timan Pechora project (OAO Lukoil Oil Co. and ConocoPhillips) would help compensate for production decreases at older fields.

==== Uranium ====
Uranium mining in Russia was conducted entirely by the corporation JSC TVELs ore mining enterprises, and in particular by open pit mining at its subsidiary JSC Priargunsky Industrial Mining & Chemical Union and also by in situ underground leaching at its subsidiaries СJSC Dalur in the Kurgan Oblast and JSC Khiagda in Buryatia. Annual uranium production was about 3,400 t, of which more than 90% was produced by Priargunsky. Uranium-bearing ores and solutions were processed to generate uranium concentrates, which were shipped for further reprocessing at the JSC Chepetsky Mechanical Plant.

The country's annual natural uranium consumption amounted to approximately 9,000 t. According to projections, the demands for uranium by the nuclear industry in Russia will grow by 1.7 times. The “TVEL Uranium” program was launched by TVEL Corporation to further develop uranium production up to 2010; an increase in ore mining to 4,300 t of uranium in 2010 was envisioned. Mining was being developed at the JSC Dalur enterprise in the Kurgan Oblast, which produced about 200 t of uranium in 2005. The enterprise planned to increase production by 15% to 20% annually to produce 1,000 t by 2010. The construction of mine No. 6 at the Priargunsky deposit had been started to increase ore production.

The JSC Khiagda enterprise was developing a pilot mining operation to mine the Khiagdinskoye deposit in Buryatiya using underground well leaching. Khiagda commenced commercial operations in 2005 and Khiagda planned to have the capacity to produce 1,000 t/yr of uranium by 2012. Total reserves at the JSC Khiagda site reportedly amount to 100,000 t of uranium.

===== Expansion Abroad =====
South Africa

In 2013 and 2014, Vladimir Putin met with South African President Jacob Zuma to discuss uranium mining expansion and to sign a nuclear energy agreement between both nations. The agreement included the right to tender for the proposed construction of eight new nuclear reactors valued at over $100 billion. In 2017, Russia submitted their bid.

Canada

In 2009, Rosatom began buying shares in Uranium One in a bid to expand mining operations abroad. The first purchase was for 17% of shares. In 2010 the stake was increased to 51% and by 2013, to a 100% ownership. The purchase of the Canada-based mining company gave Russia ownership of a US mine in Wyoming.
