= Chez moi =

Chez moi may refer to:

- Chez moi (album), a 1974 album by Serge Lama
  - "Chez moi" (song), a song by Serge Lama
- Chez Moi (Desarthe novel), a 2009 novel by Agnès Desarthe
- Chez Moi, an 1887 painting by Harriet Backer
