= Sable tin deposit =

Tin-copper deposit in Russia

The Sable Tin Deposit also known as "Sobolinoye" (Rus: Соболиное) is a high grade tin-copper deposit located in the Solnechny District of Khabarovsk Krai in the Russian Far East. Discovered in 1964 on the basis of 1:5000 – 1:10000 mapping which identified the presence of commercial concentrations of tin at surface. It is located within the Komsomolsk Ore (Tin) District, a major tin region within Russia with both historical and current mining activities. The deposit's resources were registered in 1987 and Technical Economic Conditions for design and construction were prepared by Gipronickel, a Norilsk subsidiary in 1993 but due to economic and political turbulence the deposit was never developed or exploited

== Location ==
It is located 15 km directly north of Gorniy village and 35 km by unpaved road from the Pridorozhnoe intersection 12 km from Solnechny Town and 50 km: Industrialized city of Komsomolsk on Amur. Coordinates: 50°56'30 N and 136°28'30 E / 50°54'40 N 136°30'40 E / 50°56'05 N 136°31'15 E / 50°54'50N 136°28'50 E

== Geological Location ==
In the Eastern Asian Mesozoic Folding Zone, Eastern part of the Khingan-Okhotsky Volcanic Belt, at the intersection of the major Sikhote Alin - Mongol-Okhotsk tectonic systems and within the western part of the Sikhote Alin geanticlinal and silicate system, coinciding with the NE junction of the Badzhalsky anticlinal lifting with the Gorin downfold Left shore of the Amur, in the basins of the Silinki and Gorin tributaries.

== Geological Structure ==
A complex Jurassic-Lower Cretaceous flysch sedimentation and late cretaceous marine sedimentation and volcanogenic units and confined to the large Miao-Chansk Late Cretaceous volcanic-plutonic structure: extrusions of acidic and intermediate composition intrude units. The youngest units of the area cover sequences of Neogene basalts and complexes of unconsolidated deposits of Quaternary age.

== Exploration ==
The deposit was explored from 1972 to 1987. 230800 meters of drilling in 539 holes identified several economic zones within the deposit: Leningradskaya, Sobolinaya, Nezhdannaya. From a geological perspective mineralisation is located in the northern diorite exocontact of the Hurmulinsk volcanic-plutonic structure of a central ring type in a metamorphic transition zone from rocks characterized by biotite to chlorite grade. The basis of the geological structure of the area is complex Jurassic Lower Cretaceous flysch formation and a late sedimentary- volcanic complex. These rocks are intruded by Late Cretaceous acidic and intermediate intrusions including quartz dioritic porphyrites. Tectonic structures are widely developed on a N-S axis with subsidiary, NW, and WNW faults. Practically all are mineralized, with economic mineralization controlled by NW and N-S structures. The Leningradskaya zone is confined to a 45-50 ° NE orientation thrust.

Explored resources are confined to the Leningradskaya, Sobolinaya and Nezhdannaya zones (82.6%). Six large and medium scale and numerous small ore bodies were identified. These are cassiterite-silicate ore units of cassiterite-tourmaline mineral type, similar to other deposits in the district. Morphologically they are quartz-tourmaline impregnated vein bodies dipping 60-48° except for the Leningradskaya zone and a part of the Nezhdannaya zone. The degree of metasomatic alteration of rocks increases closer to the Leningradskaya area to the west. Host rocks for the upper parts of the ore zones are the Upper Cretaceous sediments and the volcanic rocks in the richer lower Jurassic terrigenous deposit. Mineralisation along strike and dip ranges from tens to several hundreds of meters. Thickness from 0.2 – 18.0m, average: 4.4m.

Ore zones are similar in material composition and represented by the same mineral assemblages: quartz-tourmaline, quartz-cassiterite, quartz- sulphide, and supergene assemblages. Mineralisation is very similar to other regional tin deposits. 40 minerals were studied for tin associated components- 1323 integrated, 18 group and 143 mono-mineral samples. Oxidized ores 9.4% (in C1+C2 resources)

Minerals: cassiterite, chalcopyrite, arsenopyrite, wolframite, pyrite, cellular-pyrite Non-metallics: quartz-tourmaline, carbonates, chlorite, sericite.

85-90% of tin is presented by cassiterite, mainly quartz associated and is concentrated in lower structural floor – Jurassic sandstone and shale: Cassiterite in developed sulphide mineralization in upper floor of cretaceous volcanites is corroded by sulphides forming stannite and hydro-stannite. - showing vertical zonation in the distribution of mineral assemblages that form ore bodies.

== Resources ==
10.461 million tonnes of ore were registered with the State Reserves Commission (GKZ) in 1987 of which 4.366 million tonnes were categorised as C1 (Measured) and 6.098 as C2 (Indicated). The C1 resources has grades of 1.07% Sn and 0.62% Cu, while C2 resources have grades of 0.74% Sn and 0.43% Cu. (Average grades are 0.88% Sn and 0.53% Cu). Associated minerals are Tungsten at 0.065%, Bismuth, Indium, Silver.

== Ownership ==
In late 2012 a Moscow-based company, Zaibaikalskaya Gornorundnaya Kompaniya, using a commercial trading name "Sable Tin Resources", acquired the Sobolinoye License at a State Auction. The License is a mining license valid until the end of 2032.
