= Je suis malade (album) =

Studio album by Serge Lama
- Released: 1973
- Studio: Studio Des Dames
- Label: Philips Records
- Producer: Andre Chappelle

Serge Lama chronology
Superman (1971)	Je suis malade (1973)	Chez moi (1974)

Singles from Je suis malade
- 1. "Le gibier manque et les femmes sont rares", c/w "Dans l'espace" Released: 1972; 2. "Je suis malade", c/w "Les P'tites Femmes de Pigalle" Released: 1973

Je suis malade is a studio album by French singer and songwriter Serge Lama, released in 1973 on Philips Records.

== Commercial performance ==
The album sold 110,000 copies in only 15 days.

US Billboard's 30 June 1973 issue shows the LP in the top 10 in both France and French Belgium.

== Track listing ==
Side A
No.	Title	Length
1.	"Je suis malade"
2.	"Les Glycines"
3.	"La Chanson des pêcheurs"
4.	"La Fronde"
5.	"La Crise de nerfs"
6.	"Dans l'espace"

Side B
No.	Title	Length
1.	"La chanteuse a vingt ans"
2.	"L'Enfant d'un autre"
3.	"Les P'tites Femmes de Pigalle"
4.	"Mariages d'un jour"
5.	"À chaque son de cloche"
6.	"Le gibier manque et les femmes sont rares"

== Certifications ==
Region	Certification	Certified units/sales
France (SNEP)	Platinum	400,000^{*}
^{*} Sales figures based on certification alone.
