= Edvin Marton =

Hungarian musician

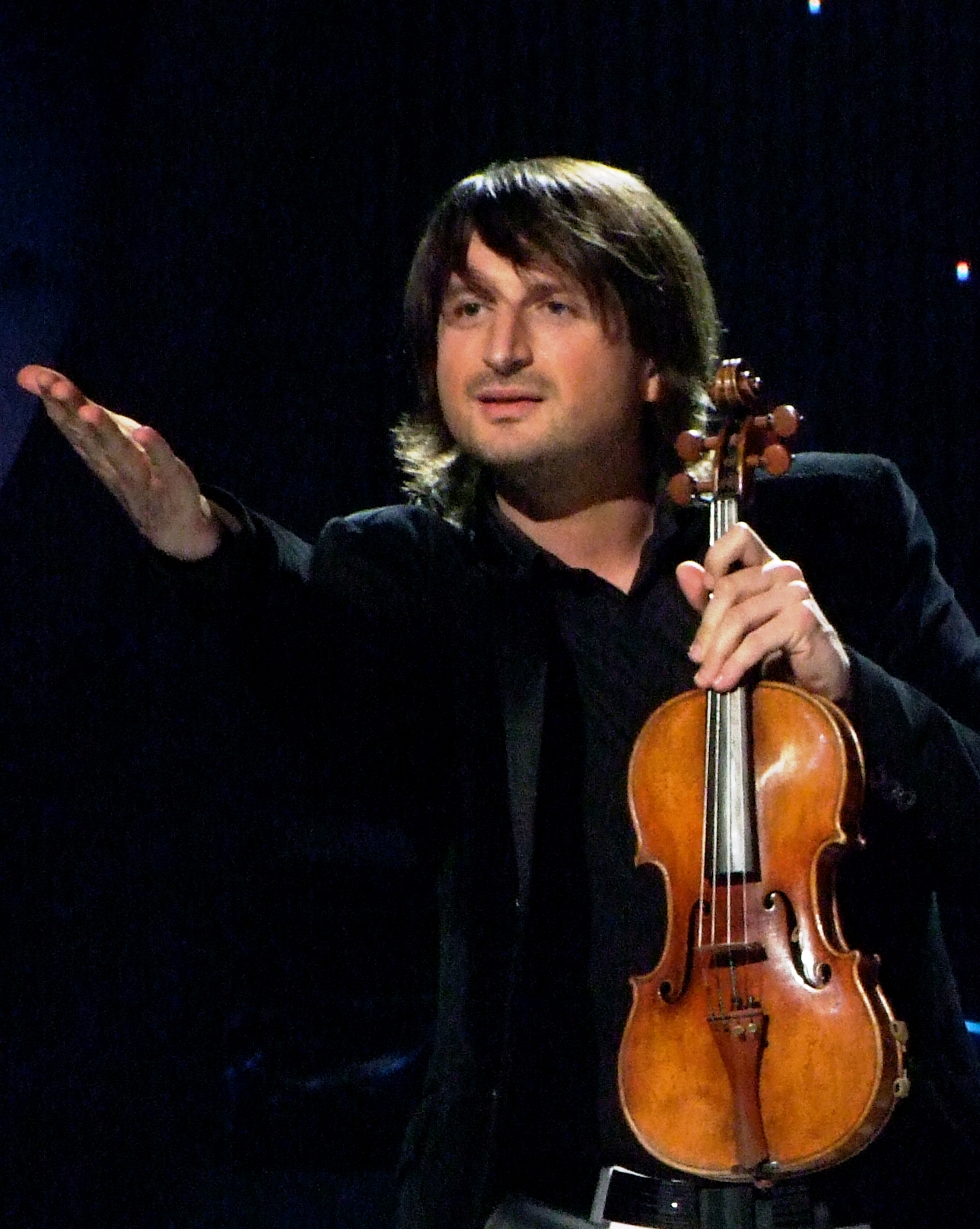
Edvin Marton

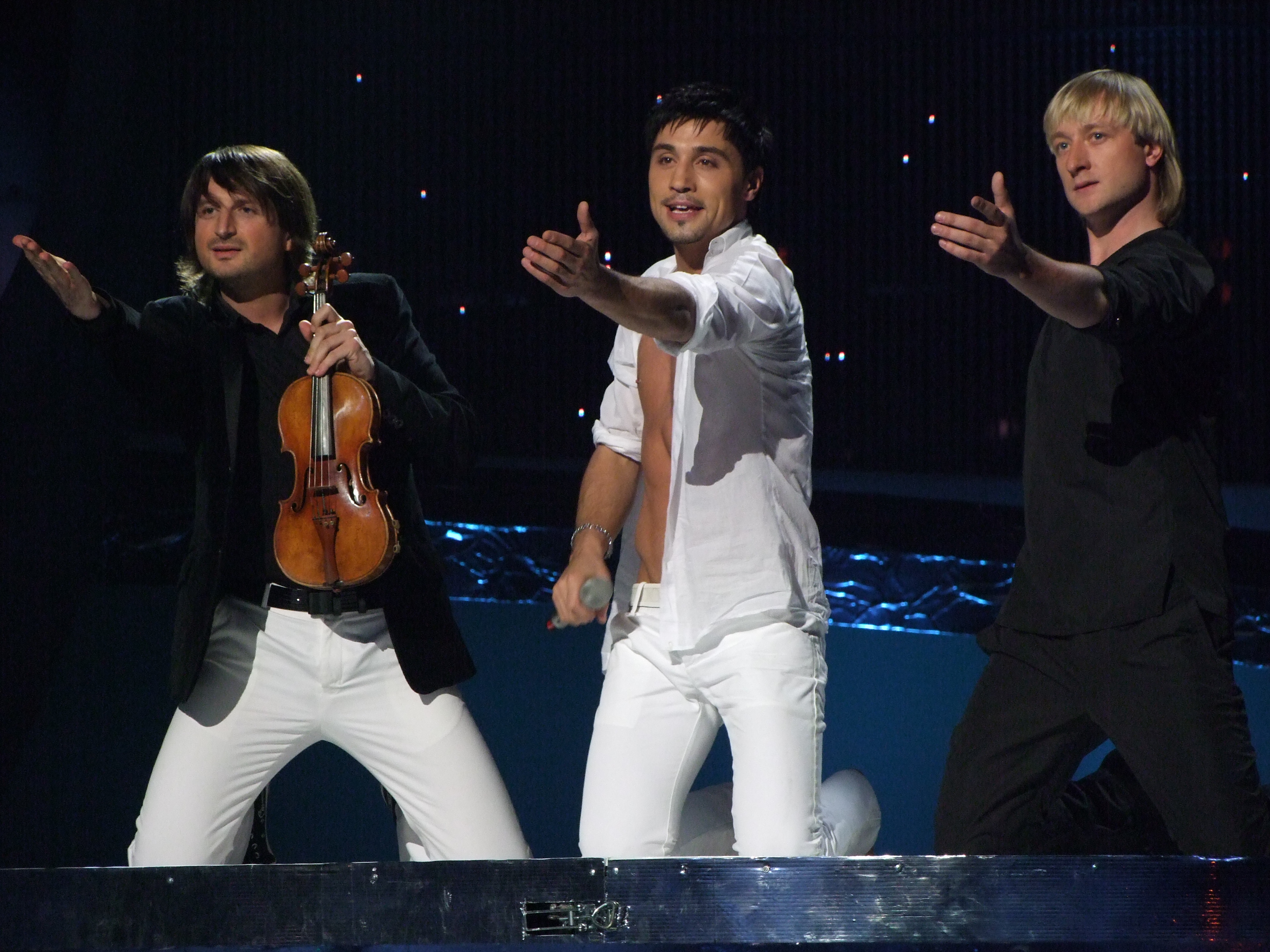
Edvin Marton, on left, at the Eurovision Song Contest 2008 with Dima Bilan and Evgeni Plushenko.

Edvin Marton (born Lajos Edvin Csűry, 17 February 1974, Vylok, Ukraine) is a Ukrainian-born Hungarian composer and violinist. He became known as the violinist of the skaters, mainly because Evgeni Plushenko, Stéphane Lambiel, Yuzuru Hanyu (as a tribute to Plushenko), and other famous skaters often skated to his music.

== Biography ==
He was born in an area of Ukraine largely inhabited by ethnic Hungarians. He was born into a musical family and by the age of four was already learning the violin from his parents. He was eight years old when accepted into that alma mater for the most talented musicians of the Soviet Union, the Central Tchaikovsky Music School in Moscow to study under Leo Lundstrem.

He continued his studies with Eugenia Tchougaeva. He gave his first important concert at the age of twelve, with the Moscow Symphony Orchestra. At the age of seventeen, he became a student at the Liszt Ferenc Academy of Music Budapest, in the class of Géza Kapás. He took part in a masterclass given by Ruggiero Ricci, where he won the prize for the best participant. He was also the Grand Prize winner of the International Course Competition in Berlin, after having been invited by Ruggiero Ricci. Since 1993, he has been a "young soloist" for the National Philharmonic Concert Agency in Hungary.

He has performed with almost all the main Hungarian orchestras, and given concerts in Austria, Italy, Germany and Switzerland. In May 1994, the famous violin teacher Dorothy DeLay invited him to the Aspen Music Festival in Colorado. where he gave a concert with Rohan de Silva. In New York, he won a scholarship and was admitted to the class of Dorothy Delay at the Juilliard School of Music. His studies in New York City at the Juilliard School of Music brought professional contacts, which meant changes in his musical style. There, in one of the most revered classical music environments of Juilliard, he mingled with DJs and jumped from high-level classical to what is referred to today as crossover.

While still in his twenties, Marton had travelled to more than thirty countries and played in such renowned concert halls as the Berliner Philharmonie and Vienna's Konzerthaus. But he was looking for a change. A former classmate said of him, "After he graduated from the music academy, the talented, jovial and rotund Lajos disappeared, only to return as a slim, easy listening, music-playing Edvin Marton."

Marton participated for Russia at the Eurovision Song Contest 2008 and won the event in collaboration with singer Dima Bilan and the 2006 Olympic champion in figure skating, Evgeni Plushenko. In 2010, they performed together at the first edition of the annual Japanese touring ice show Fantasy on Ice in Fukui.

== Education ==
- In 1983 Tchaikovsky Academy, Moscow for Prof. Leo Lundstrem
- in 1991 Liszt Ferenc Academy of Music (Zeneakadémia), Budapest
- In 1994 Juilliard School of Music in New York
- In 1995 graduated at Music Academy in Vienna

== Awards ==
- At the Gala exhibitions of the Torino 2006 Olympic Winter Games, Marton played violin and performed together with figure skating Gold Medal Winners Evgeni Plushenko ("Tosca Fantasy"), and Tatiana Totmianina & Maxim Marinin ("Romeo and Juliet").
- 2008 Eurovision Song Contest — featured performer and co-writer of Dima Bilan's winning song "Believe".

== Discography ==
Edvin Marton has released five albums to date:

- Sarasate (1996)
- Strings 'N' Beats (2001)
- Virtuoso (2004)
- Stradivarius (2006)
- Hollywood (2010)
