= Chez moi (song) =

Single by Serge Lama

from the album Chez moi
- A-side: "Chez moi"
- B-side: "La braconne"
- Released: 1974
- Label: Philips
- Songwriter(s): Serge Lama, Alice Dona

Music video
- Serge Lama – "Chez moi" (French TV, 1978) on YouTube

"Chez moi" is a song by French singer and songwriter Serge Lama. It was released in 1974 (as a single and on his album titled Chez moi).

== Composition and writing ==
The song was written by Serge Lama and composed by Alice Dona.

== Commercial performance ==
The single reached the top 15 in France (according to the data compiled by Centre d'information et de documentation du disque).

== Track listing ==
7" single Philips 6009 500 (1974, France etc.)

A. "Chez moi" (3:45)
B. "La braconne" (3:30)

== Awards ==
- 1975 : Prix Vincent-Scotto
