= Andreas Goller =

Italian businessman (born 1976)

Andreas Goller (born 15 March 1976 in Bolzano) is an Italian sports manager and football players' agent.

== Career ==
In the winter season of 2002/2003, the German multiple times World Champion and Olympic Medalist skier Martina Ertl became his first client in sports management field.

In 2004, Andreas Goller became the personal manager of the all-time most successful Italian downhill skier Kristian Ghedina. After the end of his skiing career Ghedina became an official race driver of BMW in touring car championships.

In 2006, Andreas Goller participated in a television commercial for the Japanese motor scooter Suzuki Burgman together with the Italian World Champion footballer and captain of FC Juventus Turin Alessandro Del Piero in a leading role.

For the start of winter season 2007/2008, the Italian Ski Vice World Champion Peter Fill became the client of the sport management agency Flashlight, founded, owned and managed by Andreas Goller.

In 2008, the German specialized magazines in marketing communications “Werben & Verkaufen” and “Kontakter” announced that Andreas Goller’s FlashLight agency is responsible for the commercialization of Italians football World Champion and FC Bayern Munich striker Luca Toni.

For its client Fisker Automotive FlashLight coordinated a campaign wherein Denmark’s Crown Prince Frederik was the first person outside the development team to drive the new eco-friendly Fisker Karma at COP15 UN Climate Conference in Copenhagen.

In December 2009, Andreas Goller signed the Olympic Champion figure skater Evgeni Plushenko for international representation.
