= Solnechny, Vologda Oblast =

Solnechny Солнечный
- Settlement
- Location within Vologda Oblast Location within Russia
- Coordinates: 58°51′N 36°24′E
- Country: Russia
- Region: Vologda Oblast
- District: Ustyuzhensky District
- Time zone: UTC+3:00

Solnechny (Russian: Солнечный) is a rural locality (a settlement) in Ustyuzhenskoye Rural Settlement, Ustyuzhensky District, Vologda Oblast, Russia. The population is 86 as of 2002. There are 8 streets.

== Geography ==
Solnechny is located 3 km (1.9 mi) northwest of Ustyuzhna (the district's administrative centre) by road. Bernyakovo is the nearest rural locality.
