= Solnechnoye, Republic of Dagestan =

Solnechnoye Солнечное Баташ
- Selo
- Location within Republic of Dagestan Location within Russia
- Coordinates: 43°16′N 46°30′E
- Country: Russia
- Region: Republic of Dagestan
- District: Khasavyurtovsky District
- Time zone: UTC+3:00

Solnechnoye (Russian: Солнечное; Chechen: Баташ, Bataş) is a rural locality (a selo) in Khasavyurtovsky District, Republic of Dagestan, Russia. Population: 5,495 (2021 census); 3,759 (2002 census); 2,795 (1989 Soviet census). There are 42 streets.

== Geography ==
Solnechnoye is located 12 km northwest of Khasavyurt (the district's administrative centre) by road. Nuradilovo is the nearest rural locality.
