= Solnechny, Amur Oblast =

Solnechny Солнечный
- Settlement
- Location within Amur Oblast Location within Russia
- Coordinates: 54°07′N 123°40′E
- Country: Russia
- Region: Amur Oblast
- District: Skovorodinsky District
- Time zone: UTC+9:00

Solnechny (Russian: Солнечный) is a rural locality (a settlement) and the administrative center of Solnechny Selsoviet of Skovorodinsky District, Amur Oblast, Russia. The population was 341 as of 2018. There are 12 streets.

== Geography ==
Solnechny is located 41 km northwest of Skovorodino (the district's administrative centre) by road. BAM is the nearest rural locality.
