= Solnechny, Astrakhan Oblast =

Solnechny Солнечный
- Settlement
- Location within Astrakhan Oblast Location within Russia
- Coordinates: 46°31′N 48°19′E
- Country: Russia
- Region: Astrakhan Oblast
- District: Krasnoyarsky District
- Time zone: UTC+4:00

Solnechny (Russian: Солнечный) is a rural locality (a settlement) in Zabuzansky Selsoviet, Krasnoyarsky District, Astrakhan Oblast, Russia. The population was 217 as of 2010. There are 2 streets.

== Geography ==
It is located on the Buzan River, 9 km southwest of Krasny Yar (the district's administrative centre) by road. Zabuzan is the nearest rural locality.
