= Solnechny, Khabarovsk Krai =

Urban locality in Khabarovsk Krai, Russia

Solnechny Солнечный
- Urban-type settlement
- Interactive map of Solnechny
- Location of Solnechny Solnechny (Khabarovsk Krai)
- Coordinates: 50°43′25″N 136°38′18″E
- Country: Russia
- Federal subject: Khabarovsk Krai
- Founded: 1963
- Elevation: 300 m (980 ft)

Population
  - Estimate (2025): 12,122 )
- Time zone: UTC+10 (MSK+7)
- Postal code: 682711
- OKTMO ID: 08644151051

Solnechny (Russian: Солнечный) is an urban-type settlement and the administrative center of Solnechny District, Khabarovsk Krai, Russia. Population: 13,306 (2010 census); 14,415 (2002 census); 17,331 (1989 Soviet census).
