= Chez moi (album) =

1974 studio album by Serge Lama

Studio album by Serge Lama
- Released: 1974
- Studio: Studio Des Dames
- Genre: Chanson
- Label: Philips Records
- Producer: Andre Chapelle

Serge Lama chronology
Je suis malade (1973)	Chez moi (1974)	La Vie lilas (1975)

Singles from Chez moi
- 1. "Chez moi", c/w "La Braconne" Released: 1974

Chez moi is a studio album by French singer/songwriter Serge Lama, released in 1974 on Philips Records.

== Background ==
Chez moi was a follow-up to Serge Lama's very successful 1973 album Je suis malade, which sold 110,000 copies in only 15 days.

== Commercial performance ==
The album reached number one in France (according to the data compiled by Centre d'information et de documentation du disque).

== Track listing ==
Side A
No.	Title	Length
1.	"Chez moi"
2.	"L'esclave"
3.	"Boire un petit coup"
4.	"Star"
5.	"La braconne"
6.	"Mes frères"

Side B
No.	Title	Length
1.	"Le laveur de carreaux"
2.	"Ah !"
3.	"La salle de bain"
4.	"Tous les auf wiedersehen"
5.	"Le secrétaire"
6.	"Toute blanche"

== Certifications ==
Region	Certification	Certified units/sales
France (SNEP)	Platinum	400,000^{*}
^{*} Sales figures based on certification alone.
