= Alice Dona =

French singer and songwriter (born 1946)

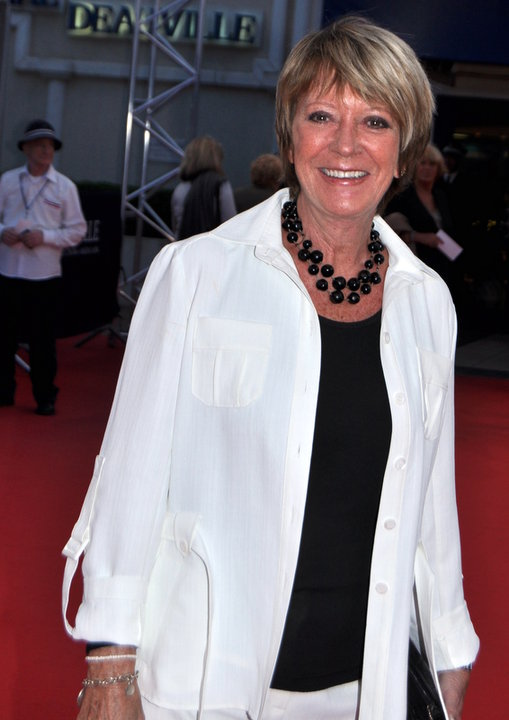
Alice Dona at the Festival of American Cinema of Deauville in 2010

Alice Donadel (born 17 February 1946 in Maisons-Alfort), known by her stage name Alice Dona, is a French singer and songwriter. She was born to an Italian father from Veneto and a French mother, both musicians.

As a singer, she recorded 11 singles from 1963 to 1965, among them "Demain, j'ai dix-sept ans", "Surboum 63", "Mon Train de banlieue", and "Avec toi"; the latter, co-written with Jacques Demarny, was her entry for the Rose de France song competition in 1966. After starting a family she then turned more to songwriting and provided a series of hits for other French singers during the 1970s.

== Selected compositions ==
- "Ton Côté du lit", "Le général a dit" and "La fan" for Joe Dassin;
- "Les amants sont maigres, les maris sont gras" for Régine;
- "Qu'attends-tu de moi", "Des Prières" and "Un oiseau chante" for Mireille Mathieu;
- "Un homme a traversé la mer" for Enrico Macias;
- "C'est écrit" for Sheila;
- "Combien faudra-t-il de temps" for Hervé Vilard;
- "Le Monsieur qui passe", "Ma Dernière Volonté" and "Le Barbier de Belleville" for Serge Reggiani;
- "Tables séparées" for Dalida;
- "Deux Bateaux" and "Le Dernier Baiser" for Annie Girardot;
- "Riche" for Sylvie Vartan;
- "C'est de l'eau, c'est du vent", "Les Ballons et les Billes", "Le Musée de ma vie", "Un peu d'amour, beaucoup de haine", "Merci merci beaucoup", "L'Anneau dans la rivière" and "Gens qui pleurent, gens qui rient" for Claude François;
- "Un Jardin sur la terre", "Chez moi" and "Je suis malade" for Serge Lama, the latter brought to success by Dalida and Lara Fabian.
