= Solnechnoye, Amur Oblast =

Solnechnoye Солнечное
- Selo
- Location within Amur Oblast Location within Russia
- Coordinates: 50°36′N 127°59′E
- Country: Russia
- Region: Amur Oblast
- District: Ivanovsky District
- Time zone: UTC+9:00

Solnechnoye (Russian: Солнечное) is a rural locality (a selo) and the administrative center of Priozerny Selsoviet of Ivanovsky District, Amur Oblast, Russia. The population was 412 as of 2018. There are 12 streets.

== Geography ==
Solnechnoye is located 36 km north of Ivanovka (the district's administrative centre) by road. Srednebelaya is the nearest rural locality.
