= Solnechny, Altai Krai =

Solnechny Солнечный
- Settlement
- Location within Altai Krai Location within Russia
- Coordinates: 52°30′N 82°45′E
- Country: Russia
- Region: Altai Krai
- District: Aleysky District
- Time zone: UTC+7:00

Solnechny (Russian: Солнечный) is a rural locality (a settlement) in Zavetilyichyovsky Selsoviet, Aleysky District, Altai Krai, Russia. The population was 839 as of 2013. There are 18 streets.

== Geography ==
Solnechny is located on the Gorevka River, 4 km north of Aleysk (the district's administrative centre) by road. Aleysk is the nearest rural locality.
