= Serge Lama =

French singer

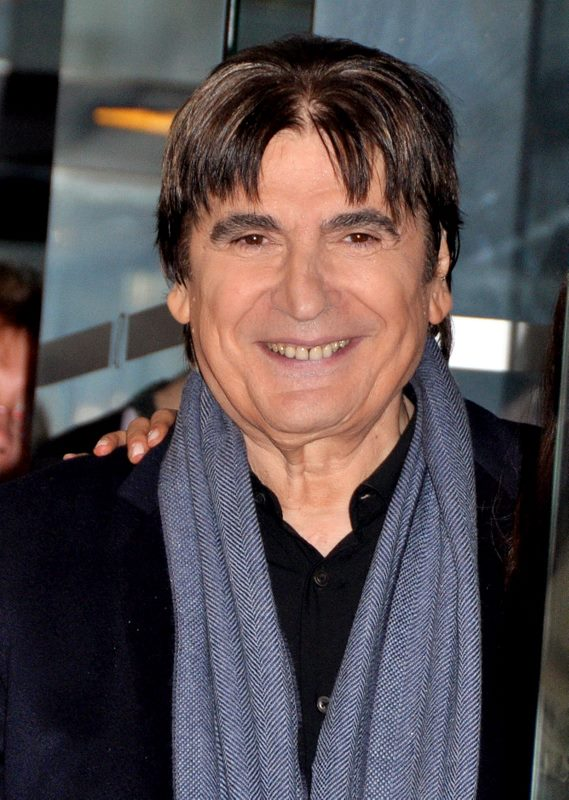
Serge Lama in October 2012.

Serge Lama (born Serge Claude Bernard Chauvier on 11 February 1943 in Bordeaux) is a French singer and songwriter.

His most famous song is Je suis malade, written with Alice Dona. It was written for Dalida and later performed by a number of artists, including Lara Fabian.

== Discography ==
=== Albums ===
- 1964 : L'humanité
- 1964 : Bel Air
- 1965 : La voix de son maitre
- 1966 : 4 chansons d'Emile Stern et de Serge Lama
- 1966 : La voix de son maître
- 1967 : La voix son maître
- 1968 : D'aventures en aventures
- 1970 : Et puis on s'aperçoit
- 1971 : Superman
- 1973 : Je suis malade
- 1974 : Chez moi
- 1975 : La vie Lilas
- 1977 : L'enfant au piano
- 1978 : Enfadolescence
- 1979 : Lama chante Brel
- 1980 : Souvenirs...Attention...Danger
- 1981 : Lama Père et fils
- 1982 : De Bonaparte à Napoléon
- 1984 : Napoléon
- 1986 : Portraits de femmes
- 1987 : Je t'aime
- 1989 : A la vie, à l'amour
- 1992 : Amald'âme
- 1994 : Lama
- 1996 : L'Ami
- 1999 : Serge Lama
- 2001 : Feuilles à feuilles
- 2003 : Plurielles
- 2008 : L'Âge d'horizons
- 2012 : La balade du poète
- 2016 : Où sont passés nos rêves

=== Live albums ===
- 1974 : À l’Olympia 74
- 1977 : Palais des congrès 77
- 1979 : Palais des congrès 79
- 1981 : Palais des congrès 81 - Avec simplicité
- 1988 : En concert au Casino de Paris 88
- 1996 : Lama l'ami Olympia
- 1998 : Symphonique Olympia 96
- 2003 : Un Jour Une vie Live Bercy
- 2005 : Accordéonissi-mots

== Theatre ==
- 1991: La Facture by Françoise Dorin (mise en scène Raymond Gérôme, Théâtre des Bouffes-Parisiens)
- 1995: Toâ by Sacha Guitry (mise en scène Stéphane Hillel, Théâtre Édouard VII)

Preceded by Guy Bonnet with Marie-Blanche	France in the Eurovision Song Contest; 1971	Succeeded by Betty Mars with Comé-comédie
