= Je suis malade (song) =

Song by Dalida
- Released: July 25, 1973
- Recorded: 1973
- Studio: Davout
- Genre: Chanson; sentimental ballad
- Length: 4:14
- Label: International Shows
- Composer: Alice Dona
- Lyricist: Serge Lama
- Producer: Orlando

"Je suis malade" ("I am sick/ill") is a 1973 song by Alice Dona and Serge Lama. Initially performed by Lama without great success, "Je suis malade" has become over the years the most emblematic song of his repertoire, and he regularly performs it live on stage. Dalida also recorded the song in 1973 receiving widespread success.

== Commercial performance ==
Serge Lama's original version passed completely unnoticed while TV and radio programmers preferred the reverse side of the single, "Les p'tites femmes de Pigalle". It's also Alice Dona's best selling song.

== Track listing ==
7" single Philips (1973, France etc.)

A. "Je suis malade" (3:59)
B. "Les p'tites femmes de Pigalle" (2:30)

== Cover versions ==
The song was covered, among others, by Lara Fabian (in 1994), Thierry Amiel (in 2003), Demis Roussos, the South Korean vocal quartet Forestella, and the Israeli singer Izhar Cohen.

== Charts ==
=== Serge Lama version ===
Chart (1973)	Peak position
Belgium (Ultratop 50 Wallonia)	8
Chart (2013)	Peak position
Belgique (Ultratop Back Catalogue Singles Wallonia)	41

=== Dalida version ===
Chart (2017)	Peak position
France (SNEP)	113
