= Solnechny District =

Solnechny District Солнечный район (Russian)
- District
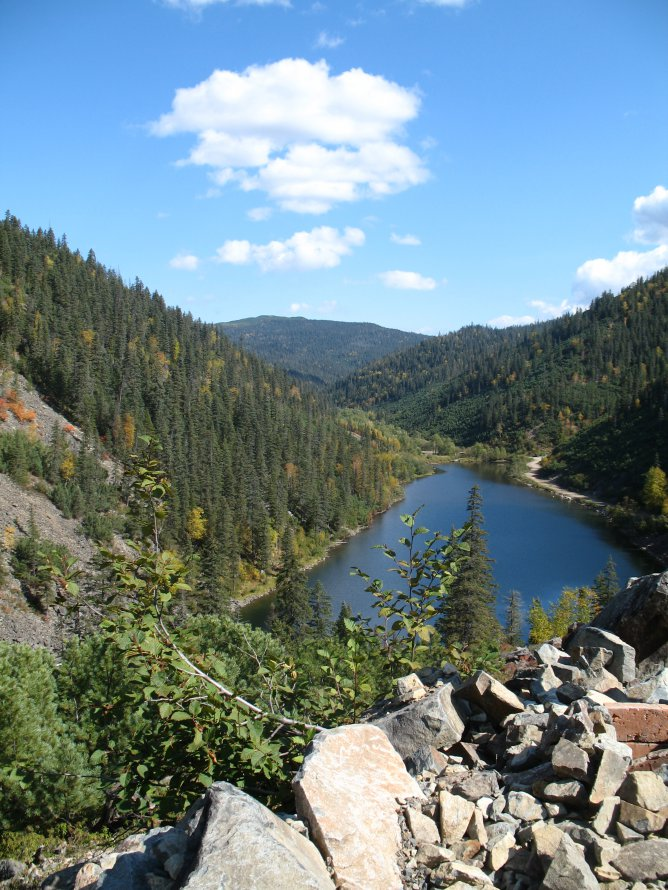
- Amut lake, Solnechny District

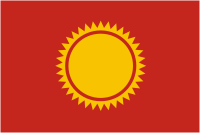
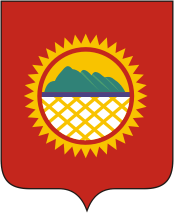
- Flag Coat of arms
- Location of Solnechny District in Khabarovsk Krai.
- Coordinates: 50°43′N 136°38′E
- Country: Russia
- Federal subject: Khabarovsk Krai
- Established: 1977
- Administrative center: Solnechny

Area
  - Total: 31,085 km^{2} (12,002 sq mi)

Population (2010 Census)
  - Total: 33,701
  - Density: 1.0842/km^{2} (2.8080/sq mi)
  - Urban: 44.0%
  - Rural: 56.0%

Administrative structure
  - Inhabited localities: 2 urban-type settlements, 17 rural localities

Municipal structure
  - Municipally incorporated as: Solnechny Municipal District
  - Municipal divisions: 2 urban settlements, 9 rural settlements
- Time zone: UTC+10 (MSK+7)
- OKTMO ID: 08644000
- Website: http://www.слнрайон.рф/

Solnechny District (Russian: Со́лнечный райо́н, romanized: Sólnechnyy rayón) is an administrative and municipal district (raion), one of the seventeen in Khabarovsk Krai, Russia. It is located in the center of the krai. The area of the district is 31,085 square kilometers (12,002 sq mi). Its administrative center is the urban locality (a work settlement) of Solnechny. Population: 33,701 (2010 census); 36,006 (2002 census); 46,772 (1989 Soviet census). The population of the administrative center accounts for 39.5% of the district's total population.

== Tin mining ==
The district owes its origins to tin exploration and mining and the subsequent Solnechny Processing Complex which sourced its ore from Solnechnoye, Festivalnoye and Predorozhnoye Tin deposits. Currently, the only operating mine is the Festivalnoye mine, operated by Rusolovo. A further operation is based upon the reprocessing of the Predorozhnoye tailings. The Sable (Sobolinoye) tin deposit is currently being developed by Zabaikalskaya Gornorudnaya Kompaniya which uses an English trading name of Sable Tin Resources.
