= Humanitarian response to the 2011 Tōhoku earthquake and tsunami =

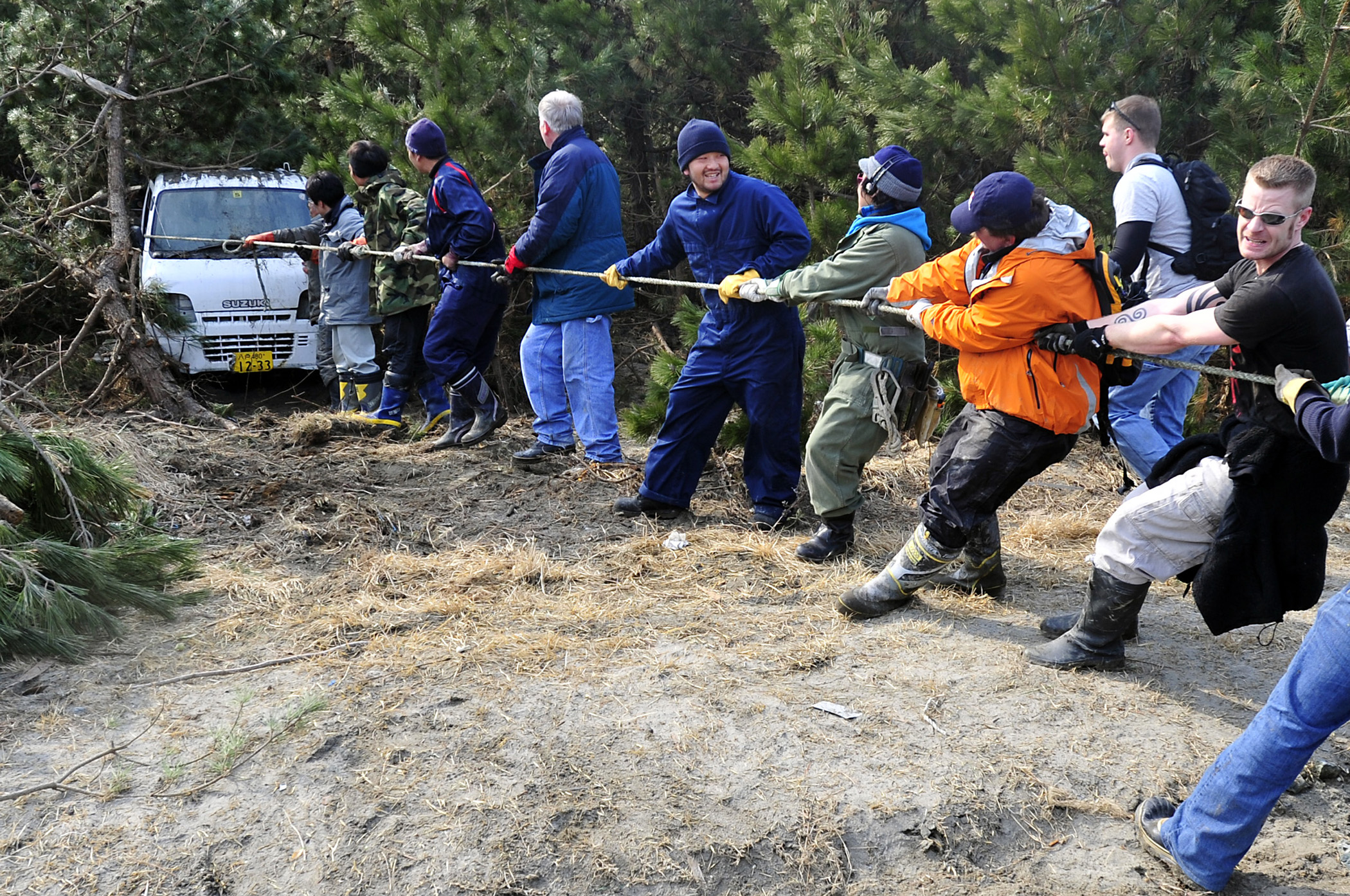
Japanese civilians and US Misawa Air Base personnel combine efforts to recover a vehicle.

Following the 2011 Tōhoku earthquake and tsunami, Japan received messages of condolence and offers of assistance from a range of international leaders. According to Japan's foreign ministry, 163 countries and regions, and 43 international organizations had offered assistance to Japan as of September 15, 2011. The magnitude of the earthquake was estimated at 9.1. This article is a list of charitable and humanitarian responses to the disaster from governments and non-governmental organizations. As of March 2012, donations to areas affected by the disaster totalled ¥520 billion and 930,000 people have assisted in disaster recovery efforts.

== Requesting and handling of foreign aid ==
Japan had a history of blocking or slowing foreign rescue teams in case of disaster, most notably the crash of Japan Air Lines Flight 123 in 1985 and the Great Hanshin earthquake in 1995. This time the Japanese government made swift response to request foreign help.

At 18:00, March 11, 2011, the Foreign Ministry of Japan announced to the public that it had specifically requested eight countries to send teams to help Japan, including South Korea, Singapore, Germany, Switzerland, the United States, China, the United Kingdom and New Zealand. Later, it also requested the activation of the International Charter on Space and Major Disasters, allowing diverse satellite imagery of affected regions to be readily shared with rescue and aid organizations.

The Japanese government softened rules for various matters after being subjected to huge criticism in the Great Hanshin earthquake for not being flexible in accepting foreign aid, including quarantining foreign rescue dogs and foreign goods, using medicine unapproved in Japan brought by foreign aid teams, customs tax for humanitarian goods, etc. The effectiveness of the Japanese bureaucracy in handling international aid had been subject to much academic research.

== Governmental responses ==
These countries offered humanitarian support to Japan.

- Afghanistan The city of Kandahar donated $50,000 to Japan.
- Albania Prime Minister Sali Berisha announced in a cabinet meeting that his government was sending US$100,000 in aid.
- Armenia The government of Armenia donated $500,000 in humanitarian assistance.

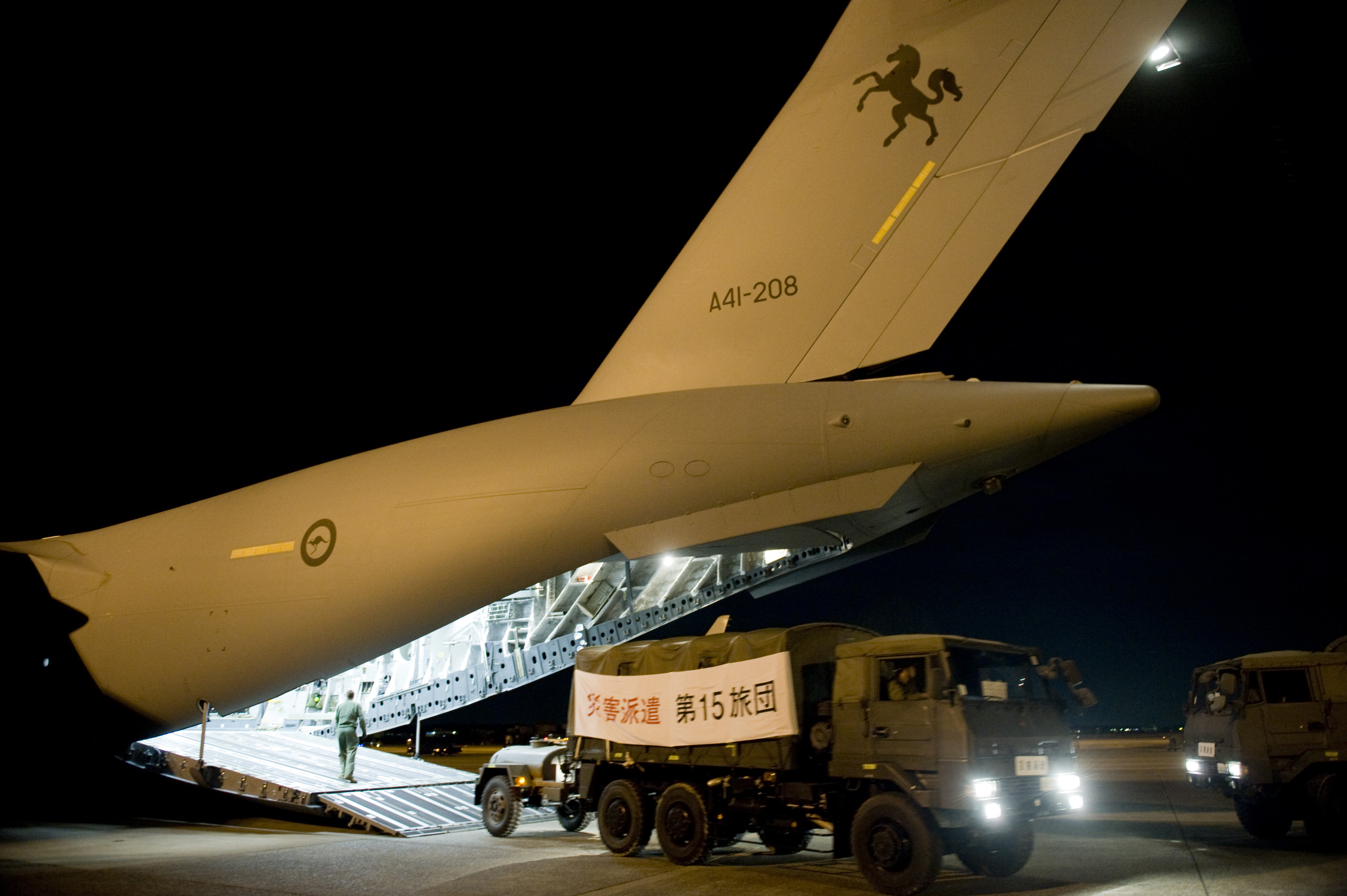
A Japanese Ground Self-Defense Force truck being unloaded from an Australian C-17 Globemaster on March 18

- Australia prepared the frigate HMAS Sydney and heavy landing ship HMAS Tobruk to carry helicopters. Australian Army engineers and medical teams would be sent to Japan if this was requested by the Japanese government. Fire and Rescue NSW sent a 76-member Urban Search and Rescue team, some of which had recently been rotated through the Christchurch earthquake recovery effort, and 20 tonnes of rescue equipment. The team was transported to Japan by a Royal Australian Air Force C-17 Globemaster III transport aircraft as Operation Pacific Assist, which remained in the country to contribute to the disaster relief effort. Two other RAAF C-17s were deployed to Japan to transport supplies and equipment, all three moving over one million pounds of cargo.
- Azerbaijan The government of Azerbaijan donated $1 million in aid to Japan for the elimination of the consequences of the disaster.
- Bangladesh sent a search and rescue team consisting of a medical wing to Japan. Bangladesh also gave medicine, 2,000 blankets, 500 rubber boots and 1,000 rubber gloves.
- Bulgaria sent blankets, food and bottled water, and offered housing in its countryside for homeless Japanese citizens.
- Cambodia Prime Minister Hun Sen ordered the Cambodian government to donate US$100,000 in aid.
- Canada initially offered a 17-member victim identification team and chemical, biological, radiological and nuclear decontamination equipment. Prime Minister Stephen Harper offered Canadian Forces airlift, medical and engineering capabilities. On March 16, 2011, Canada announced that it will send further aid. Canada has readied staff with nuclear expertise. The Canadian Red Cross alone has collected over $6 million in aid. Canada put on standby members of the Canadian military DART team in order to offer a continuous supply of fresh drinking water.
- China, sent US$167,000 in aid along with a 15-member rescue team which left Beijing on March 13, 2011, with an additional pledge of RMB 30 million Chinese yuan (US$4.57 million) of humanitarian supplies announced by China's Ministry of Commerce the following day. The Chinese government decided to donate 20,000 tons of fuel consisting of 10,000 tons of gasoline and 10,000 tons of diesel. The Chinese navy hospital ship Peace Ark was standing by to assist whilst awaiting approval from Japan, but Japan declined the offer. The northeastern Chinese city of Changchun, a sister city of Sendai, sent 10 tonnes of drinking water to Japan. The provincial government of Jilin also said it will donate 100,000 US dollars to the Miyagi prefecture government while the municipal government of Changchun, capital of Jilin, pledged 500,000 Renminbi to the municipal government of Sendai. A super-sized 62-meter long mechanized water-pump arm was donated by China's Sany group, along with an accompanying team of 5 engineers and consultants to quell the overheating and radiation problems of the crippled Fukushima nuclear power plant on 23 March 2011.
- Croatia The Croatian government donated €500,000 as financial aid and offered medical capacities and hospitality for injured in the disaster. On March 18, the Croatian Red Cross transferred €520,000 to the Japanese Red Cross Society. From March 12, more than €700,000 have been raised, of which €630,000 by public and private donations and more than €65,000 by telephone calls made by Croatian citizens. The Croatian Mountain Rescue Service put itself at service if necessary, as well as the National Protection and Rescue Directorate.
- East Timor offered to send a hundred men to remove the debris.
- Estonia The Estonian government donated €200,000.
- France sent rescue teams consisting of 134 members. The French nuclear accident response organization Groupe INTRA has shipped some of its radiation-hardened mobile robot equipment to Japan to help with the Fukushima Daiichi nuclear accident. 130 tonnes of equipment has been shipped to Japan.
- Georgia donated US$1 million via the Red Cross to relief efforts in Japan.
- Germany sent search and rescue specialists from the Technisches Hilfswerk. Furthermore, the German Aerospace Center provided TerraSAR-X- and RapidEye-satellite imagery of the affected area.
- Hungary: According to the MTI, the Hungarian National Disaster Management sent a rescue team to the area, consisting of eight technical rescue team members and a specialist officer. The team travelled to the disaster site on March 12.
- India sent woolen clothing and blankets, with additional plans to send 22 metric tons of woollen blankets. The team recovered and handed over cash worth fifty million yen to the authorities apart from the other valuables
- Indonesia sent rescue workers, medical assistance and supplies. Indonesia's government also donated US$2 million.
- Iran shipped 50,000 cans of tuna and hot food distributed to 500 people in Japan. Four physicians and first responders were also dispatched to Japan from the Iranian Red Crescent Society.

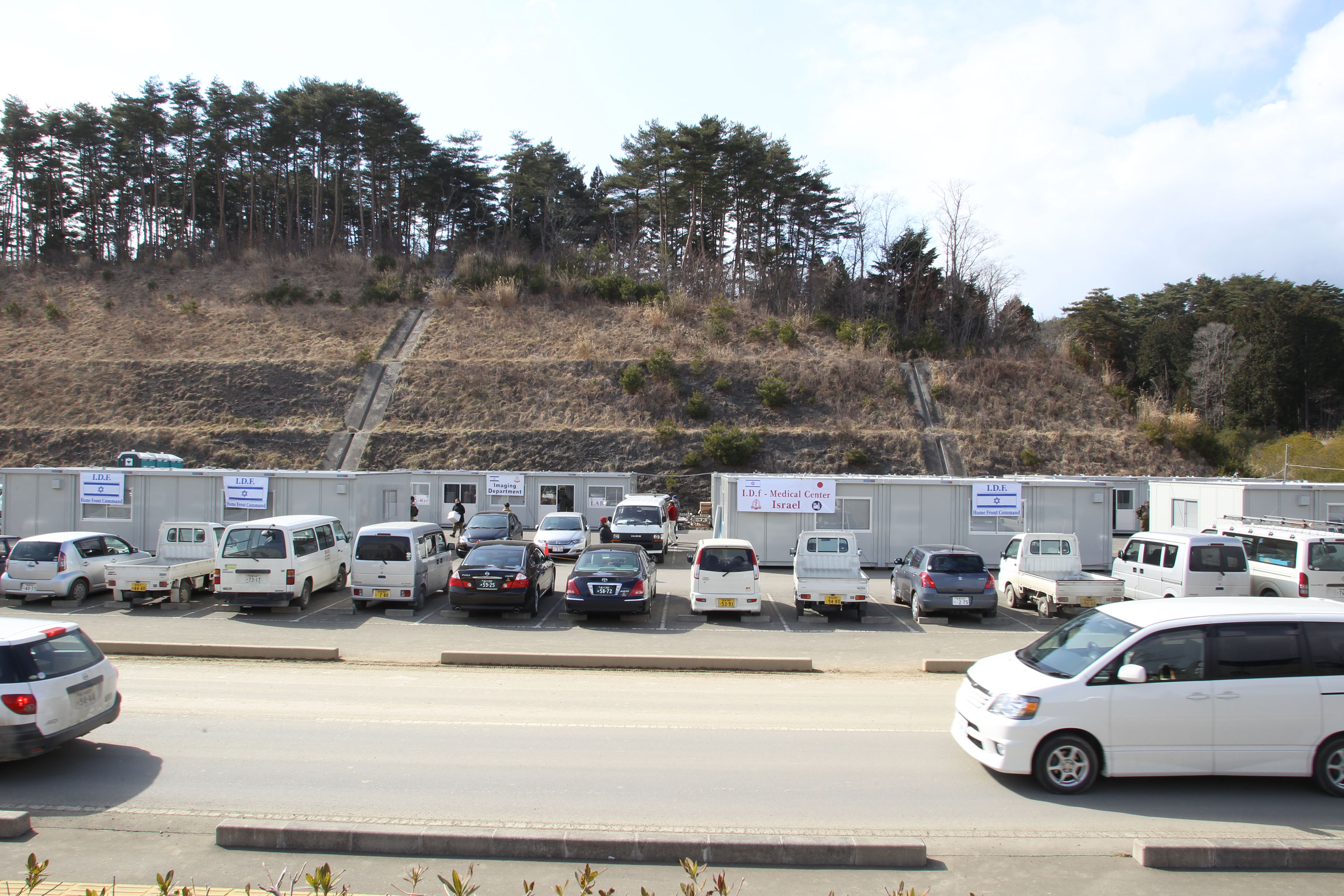
Israel Defense Forces – field clinic

- Israel sent members of the humanitarian aid organizations IsraAid and ZAKA, which consist of first responders, search and rescue specialists, logistical, emergency medical personnel and water specialists to the devastated regions of Japan. Israel also established a field hospital near Minamisanriku, 290 miles north of Tokyo. An initial team of five set up the surgery in preparation for a larger team once needs are assessed. Israel also provided aid including mattresses, blankets, coats, gloves and chemical toilets for those left homeless by the disaster. On March 27, a 53-member delegation of medical personnel from the Home Front Command and the IDF's Medical Corps arrived and opened a clinic on March 29. The clinic includes surgical, pediatric and maternity wards, an intensive care unit, pharmacy and laboratory. The delegation also brought 62 tons of medical supplies.
- Italy sent search and rescue specialists. An unidentified number of Red Cross personnel travelled to Japan.
- Kuwait contributed large amounts of resources with a total of US$550,000,000 in crude oil and other humanitarian aid supplies.
- Laos donated US$100,000 in aid.
- Macedonia's government has helped Japan with 100,000 euros. The funds would be allocated to reconstruction of damaged buildings from the earthquake. Additionally, the Macedonian authorities announced they were in contact with the Japanese embassy in order to provide any future assistance if required.
- Malaysia Prime Minister Najib Razak and Foreign Minister Anifah Aman sent Special Malaysia Disaster Assistance and Rescue Team (SMART), with doctors and medical assistants. Mercy Malaysia left Kuala Lumpur International Airport and went to Narita International Airport.
- Maldives shipped 90,000 cans of tuna to feed the people in the worst affected areas.
- Mexico sent eight search and rescue specialists, five search dogs, and two specialists in structural evaluation.
- Monaco sent eleven search and rescue specialists, seven search dogs, and attentional equipment. The unit was part of the Force Publique's Corps des Sapeurs-Pompiers.
- Mongolia's government announced that the country sent rescue teams composed of 12 members from the National Emergency Management Agency of Mongolia to Japan after it had donated US$1 million and relief supplies. The people of Mongolia from workers to the President donated their wages.
- Myanmar sent letters of condolences and donations, including a donation of 100,000 US dollars.
- The Netherlands donated US$1,000,000 in emergency relief funds.
- New Zealand sent an urban search and rescue team. They had spent the previous three weeks searching buildings following the 2011 Christchurch earthquake New Zealand also sent 15 tonnes of rescue equipment. The government donated $2 million to the Japanese Red Cross Society to support relief efforts.
- North Korea donated US$100,000 to the relief fund, with North Korean leader Kim Jong-il personally donating US$500,000 to Chongryon Korean residents in Japan.
- Pakistan The government of Pakistan sent two Pakistan Air Force C-130 cargo airplanes carrying 24 tons of relief goods, which contained high energy biscuits, milk packs and drinking water for the areas affected by the earthquake. The Pakistani embassy in Tokyo sent a team to Sendai in Miyagi Prefecture on March 15 to assess the situation and welfare of affected residents. A volunteer team organized by the Pakistani community in Japan was also sent to Sendai with food supplies.

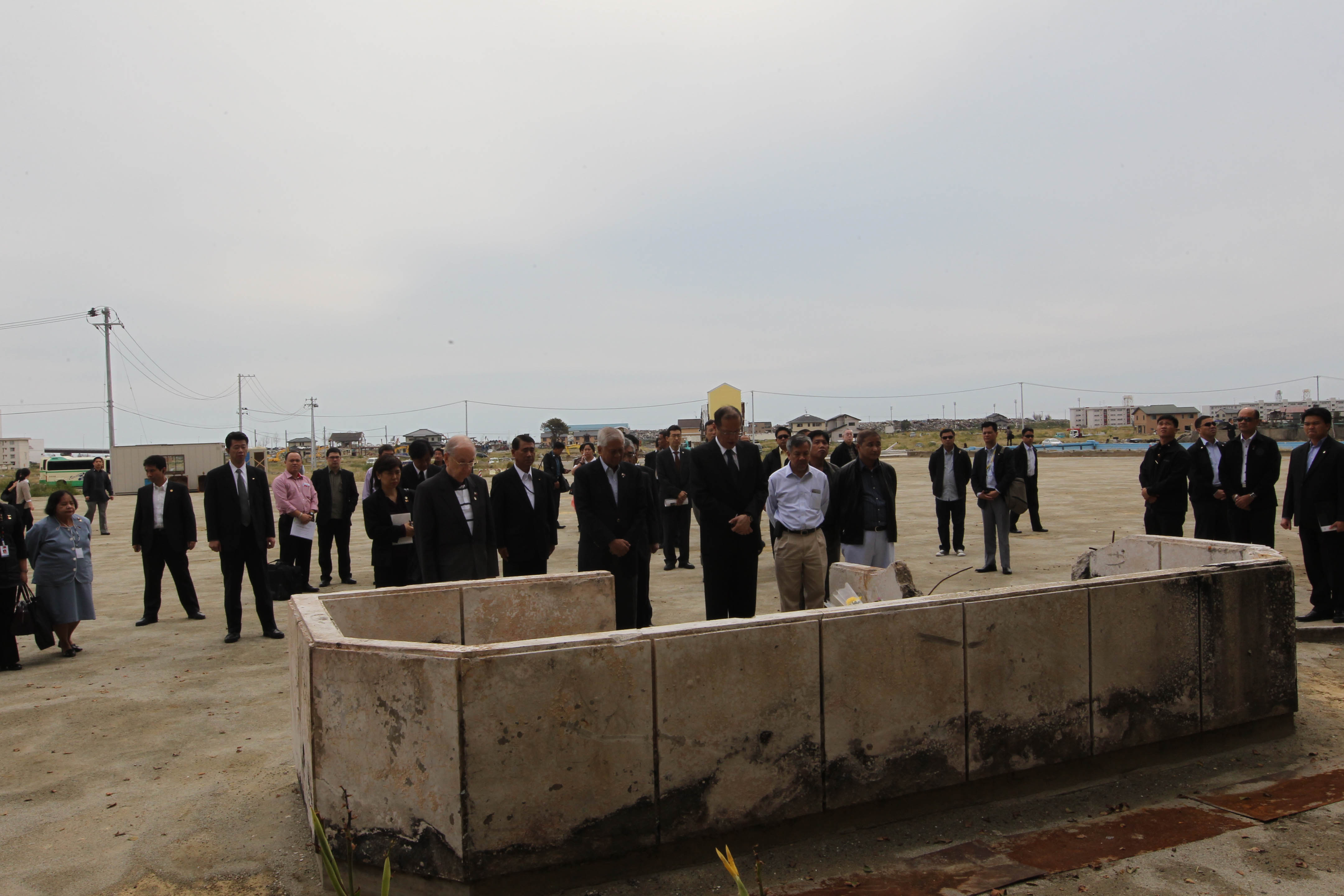
President Benigno Aquino III offers prayers for the victims of the Tōhoku earthquake and tsunami at the Kadonowaki Elementary School in Ishinomaki, Miyagi Prefecture.

- Philippines The Philippine government made ready to deploy a joint rescue mission composed of 41 members from three of its best search and rescue teams. It was to be complemented by a Philippine Air Force C-130 cargo plane and its crew. The Philippine Government also donated US$10 million to Japan. A 2-man team has been sent in advance to assess the situation. Due to the overwhelming response by the global community its search and rescue teams were not deployed. Instead it offered relief goods with the AFP's six-man advance team being in charge of distribution.
- Poland The Polish government has offered to help rescue trapped Japanese citizens in affected areas. Polish firefighters comprised the team sent by the European Union to help Japan.
- Romania On June, 28th, relief supplies from the Romanian government arrived at Narita Airport following the Great East Japan Earthquake. The relief supplies are 15,360 bottles of mineral water (2 liters), which were donated to the affected areas.
- Russia State-controlled gas giant Gazprom provided additional liquefied natural gas supplies, the company diverting two tankers of 150,000 tons to the affected area. Russia's Emergencies Ministry official Irina Andrianova confirmed that Russia will send one Mi-26 helicopter along with a team of 50 Russian rescuers to search for survivors, and promised more aid. A team of Russian rescuers will join the search for survivors. According to Russia's Emergencies Ministry spokesperson Irina Andrianova, "An Il-76 plane of the Russian Emergencies Ministry sent 50 rescuers, three relief and rescue vehicles and the necessary equipment which later arrived and covered by RT news media". The Russian emergency services agency EMERCOM offered 40 people three search and rescue dogs. Russia has sent liquidators of the Chernobyl disaster to Japan. The Russian relief group was among the largest to go to Japan to render aid and consists of 161 personnel.
- Saudi Arabia provided petroleum products equivalent to US$20 million through the Saudi Arabian state oil company, Saudi Aramco. After coordination between Japan and the Kingdom of Saudi Arabia following this offer, the two countries agreed to establish the Saudi LPG Emergency Relief Fund within the Japan LP Gas Association and to distribute support to the region through the fund.
- Serbia First Deputy Prime Minister and Minister of the Interior Ivica Dacic ordered a Division of Emergency Situations rescue team, part of the Serbian Ministry of the Interior, to ready for deployment to Japan. Multiple cities announced sending supporting financial aid. One of the first to announce aid was the city of Prokuplje, who sent $10,000. There is a Serbian Red Cross, mobile operators and other independent fundraising initiatives. The Serbian Red Cross raised US$2,321,570.
- Singapore The Singapore Red Cross (SRC) appointed by the Ministry of Foreign Affairs coordinated Singapore's relief efforts to Japan. The government of Singapore donated S$500,000 and sent a search and rescue team. The SRC sent 2 consignments of relief goods consisting of 10,000 bottles of drinking water (500 ml), 6,200 blankets, 200 mattresses and 4,000 collapsible water containers. The SRC raised a total of S$4.1 million (excluding the S$500,000 by the government) for the relief efforts.
- South Africa sent the 'Rescue South Africa Disaster Response' team to help with rescue and relief activities in the city of Ishinomaki, Miyagi Prefecture.

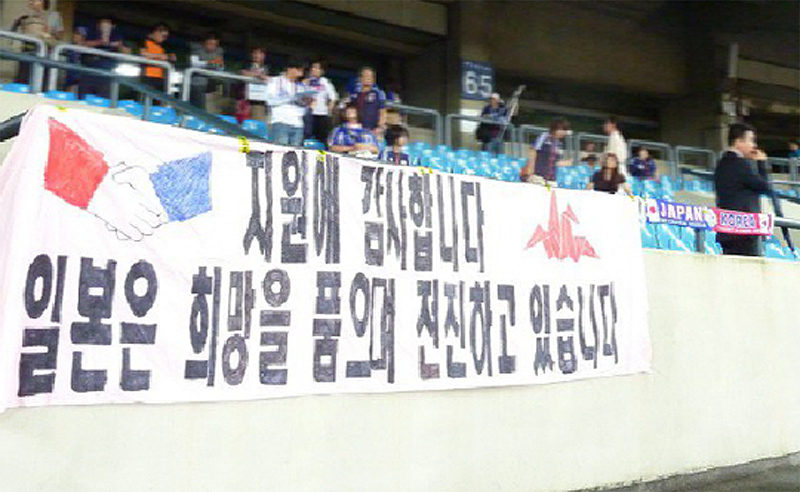
Japanese soccer fans display a banner to thank Korea for their support during the 2011 earthquake.

- South Korea was among the first foreign emergency rescue teams consisting of 5 rescuers and 2 rescue dogs who arrived in Japan on March 12, while another team of 102 rescuers arrived 2 days later. The government, corporations, media, and community groups including former comfort women lead campaigns for donation. By 22 March, the government announced that the donations reached 58.1 billion KRW (US$52 million). In addition to human aid, Korea sent boric acid to weaken nuclear reactions and power sources for electricity. Multiple provinces have offered aid as well. Gyeonggi-do offered US$1 million and raised additional aid. The South Korean consulate staffs in Sendai were crucial in escorting a Croatian citizen, Vinko Hut Kono, safely to the Akita Airport.
- Sri Lanka, which was still recovering from the 2004 Indian Ocean tsunami, announced US$1 million in aid, as well a team of medical and rescue workers.
- Switzerland sent The Swiss rescue team consist of 25 rescuers and nine sniffer dogs to Japan. Two specialists from the Swiss Humanitarian Aid Unit in Beijing flew into the country.

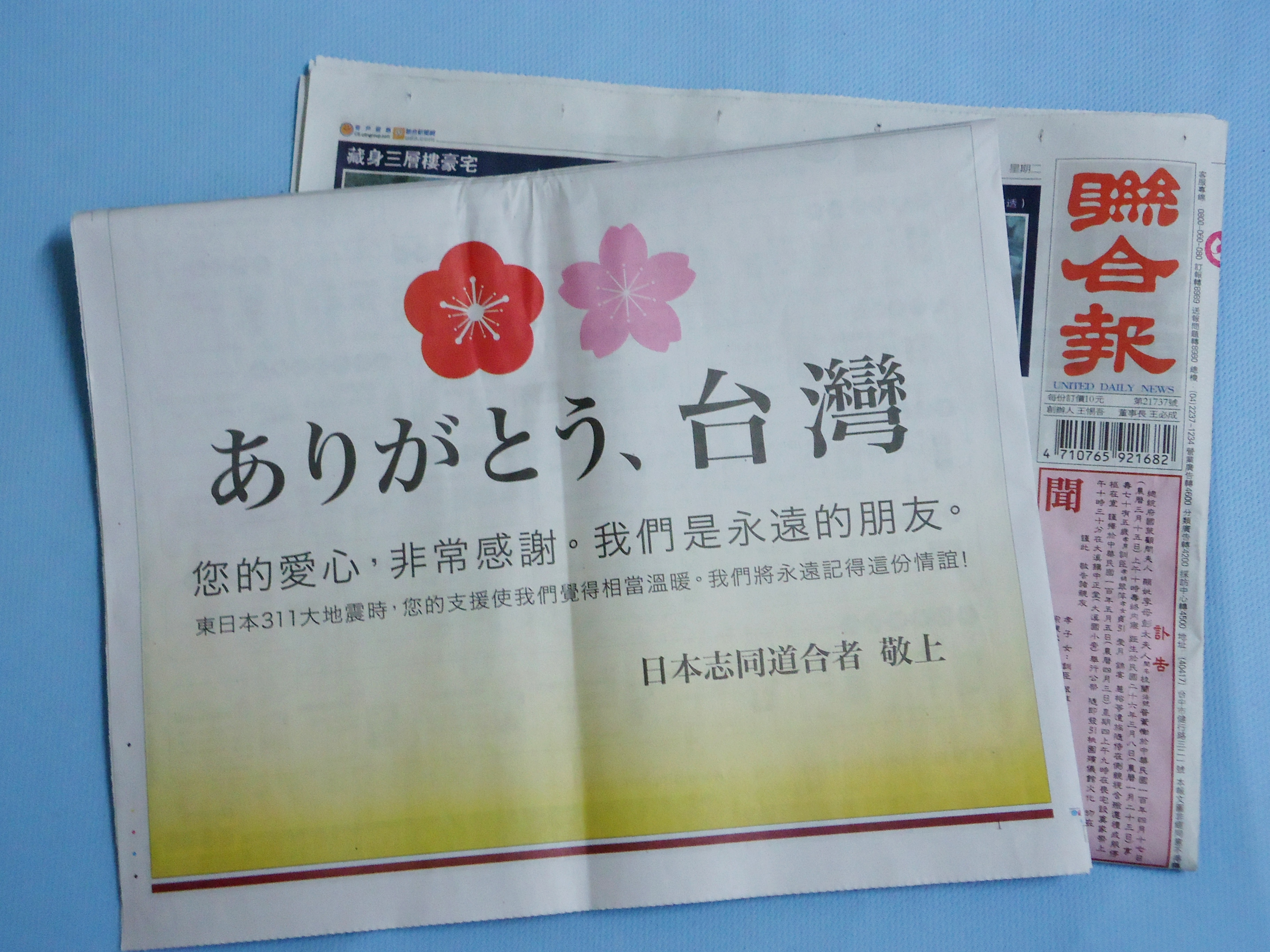
Japanese fundraisers expressed gratitude to Taiwanese aid donors in this message "Thank you, Taiwan" on the United Daily News and the Liberty Times (May 3, 2011).

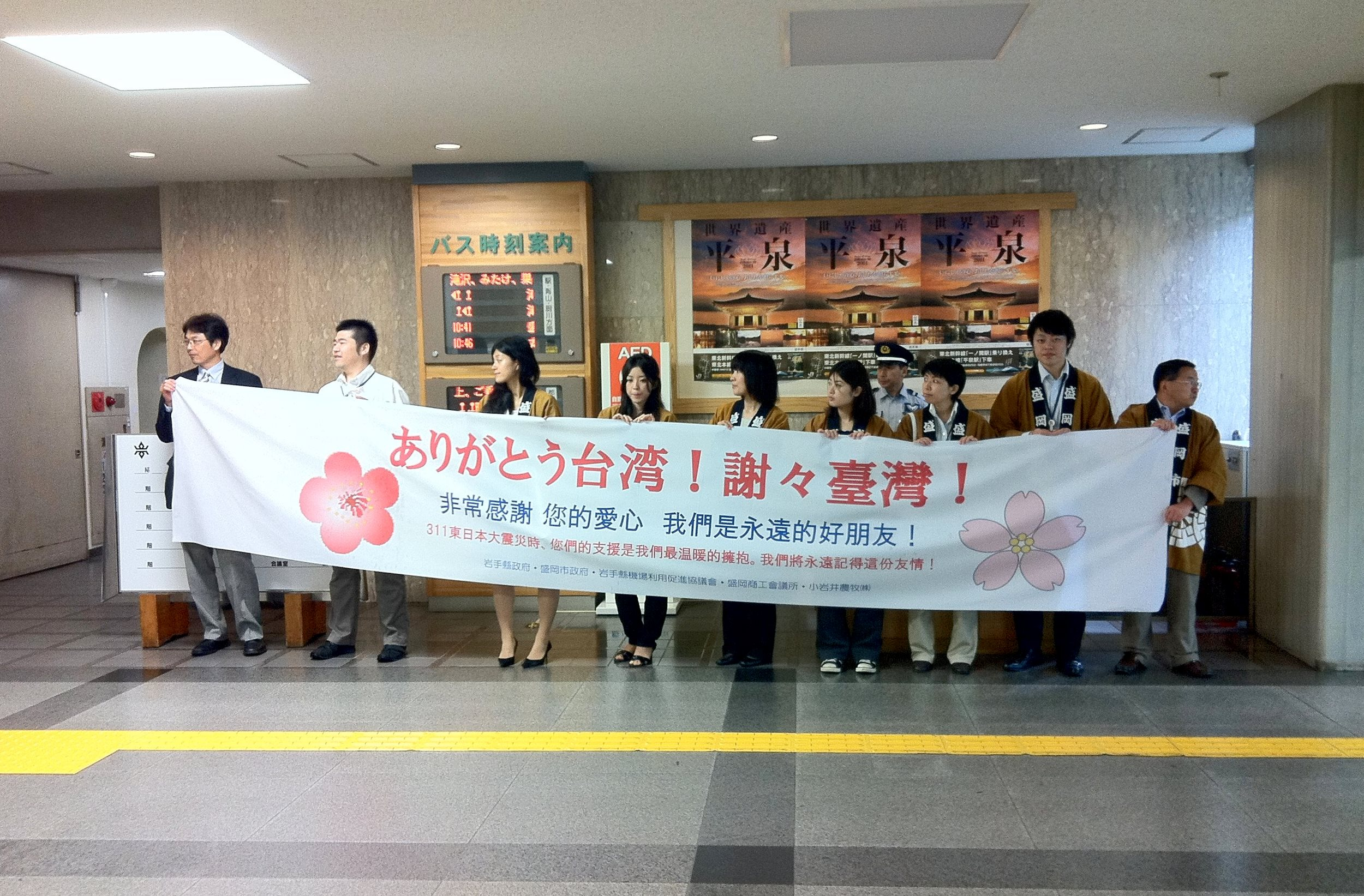
Members of the Government of Morioka, Iwate thank Taiwan for assistance.

- Taiwan provided over US$252 million in combined aid, and were among the largest contributors in monetary aid. President Ma Ying-jeou asked the Ministry of Foreign Affairs to donate NT$100 million (approximately 300 million Japanese yen or US$3.3 million) to Japan two days after the disaster. On the third and the fourth day respectively, two rescue teams, a 35-member civilian-organized team and a 28-member Ministry of the Interior team, were dispatched to Sendai and other affected areas. Besides the central government's actions, major political parties, a number of local governments, schools, companies, and charities arranged fundraising concerts and events. The Speaker of Congress, Wang Jin-pyng, and other officials visited Japan on April 20 to give a donation. By the end of 2011, the government, Red Cross Society of Taiwan, Tzu Chi Foundation, and the Chi Mei Corporation, among other civilian organizations and celebrities, collected more than NT$7,364 million (approximately 20,000 million Japanese yen or US$252 million) from the public. Among them, Mr. Chang Yung-fa, chairman of the Evergreen Group, donated 1 billion Japanese yen (approximately US$12,350,000). Starting March 14, the government and other organizations sent about one thousand tons of generators, sleeping bags, blankets, clothes, food, and other daily essentials to Japan. In particular, tens of volunteers of the Tzu Chi Foundation advanced to the disaster areas to offer hot food, drinks, materials, and shelters for victims. In addition, the Taiwanese government also assisted more than one thousand Taiwanese, Japanese, American, European, and other foreign nationals in relocating to Taiwan during the nuclear emergency. Speaker Wang and the mayor of Tainan, William Lai, led hundreds of Taiwanese tourists to visit Japan in May and June to show support. The Tourism bureau, the Tainan City Government among other institutions also provided opportunities for victims in the affected regions free tours to Taiwan for relief and to demonstrate how Taiwan recovered from the 1999 921 earthquake.

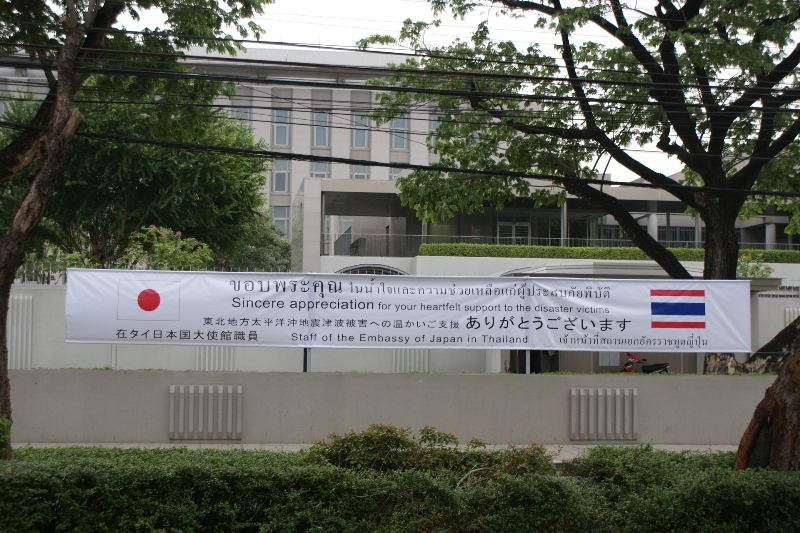
Banner thanking Thailand for assistance at Japanese Embassy in Bangkok

- Thailand The Thai government made an initial offer of 5 million baht (around $167,000), with an additional donation of 200 million baht (or about US$6.6 million), accompanied by 15,000 tons of rice, tinned food, as well as other necessities such as blankets and clothing. Search-and-rescue teams consisting of 35 specialist medic crews proficient in Japanese, officials and sniffer dogs were also dispatched. Aside from this, the Thai public through massive fundraising campaigns spearheaded by major local television stations, private firms, banks and other charitable organizations, including the Thai Red Cross, also donated more than 400 million baht (or more than US$12 million) in relief funds.
- Turkey Disaster and Emergency Management Presidency of the Republic of Turkey offered humanitarian assistance: 52 tonnes of humanitarian aid, valued at US$360,000, were shipped to Tokyo. The aid materials consisted of 5,000 blankets, 10,000 cans of tuna, 20,000 cans of peas, 12,000 cans of pike, and 10,000 iodine tablets to prevent radiation absorption.
- Ukraine sent a cargo aircraft full of relief supplies, including gas masks, radiometers, and 2,000 blankets. A rescue team was also dispatched to Japan to provide assistance. The government of Ukraine also stated that they would be ready to provide more aid if requested.
- United Kingdom sent 70 rescuers to Japan, including two search dogs, a medical support team and 11 tons of specialised rescue equipment.

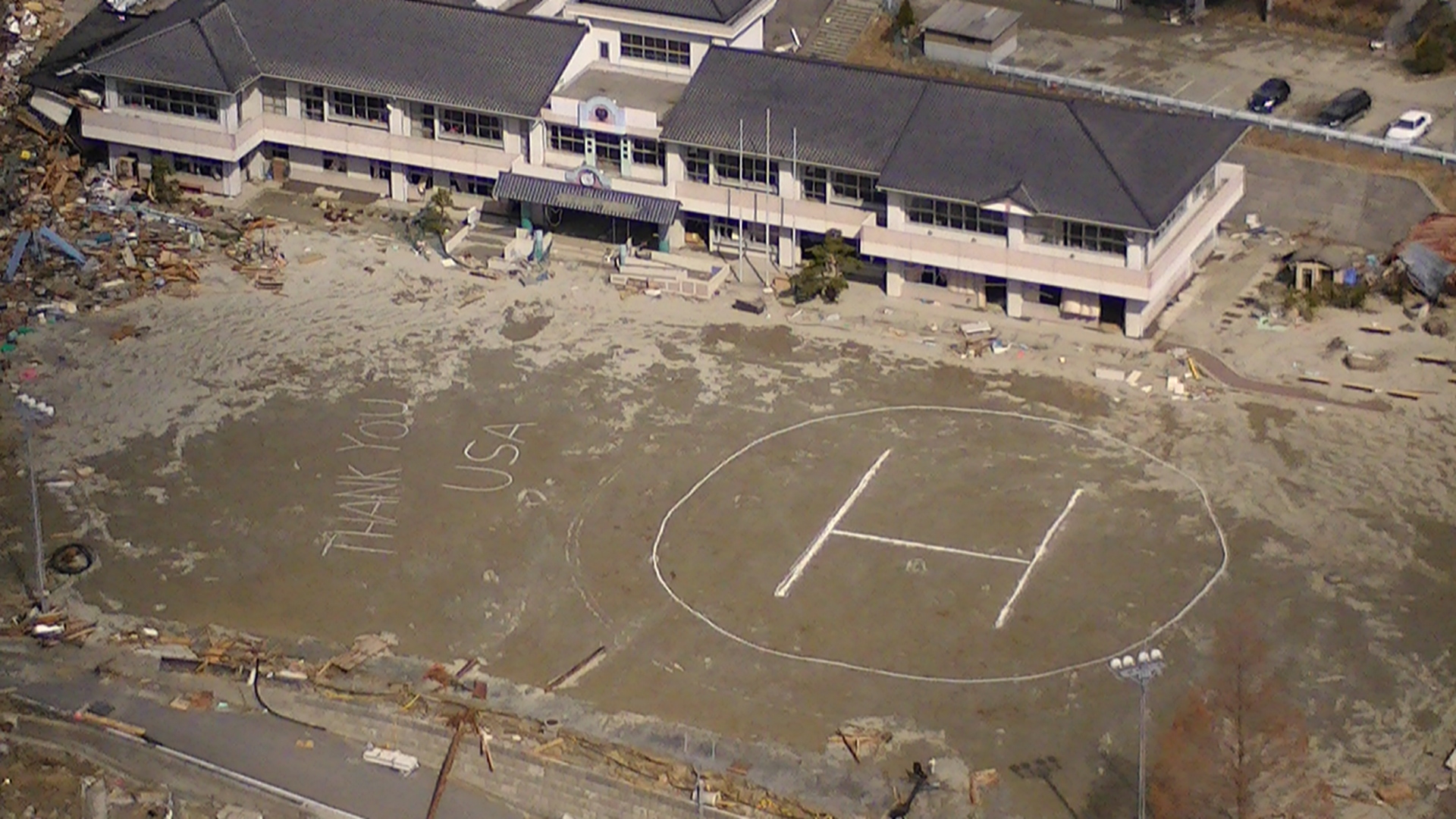
"THANK YOU USA" written in the mud deposited by the tsunami as seen by a helicopter crew during an Operation Tomodachi flight

- The United States designated its military response to the earthquake and tsunami as Operation Tomodachi (Japanese for "friend"). Various branches of the military participated, notably the USS Ronald Reagan carrier group and aviators based at Yokota Air Base, among several other personnel. The US Agency for International Development's Office of Foreign Disaster Assistance sent Urban Search and Rescue California Task Force 2 and Virginia Task Force 1, some of whom worked with Canadian SARS teams in Miyagi Prefecture. US personnel were dispatched to restore the Sendai Airport, which sustained extensive damage and flooding. The State Department moved its embassy operations, set up contact information systems and issued travel advisories and later evacuation orders for American civilians.
- Uzbekistan Carlsberg Uzbekistan produced beer in bottles with notes that read Yaponiyani qoʻllab-quvvatlaylik! (Let's support Japan!).
- Vietnam The Vietnam Red Cross National Headquarters launched Official Appeal on March 16, 2011, to call people from all ministries, governmental agencies, Fatherland Front, organizations, corporations, enterprises, and people all over Vietnam to assist people affected by the tsunami and earthquake in Japan. On June 17, 2011, the Vietnam Red Cross organized the evaluation meeting of the appeal. In total, the government and the people of Vietnam have donated VND 161,303,484,931, equivalent to US$7,783,393, contributing to the assistance of people affected by the tsunami and earthquake in Japan.

== Non-governmental responses ==
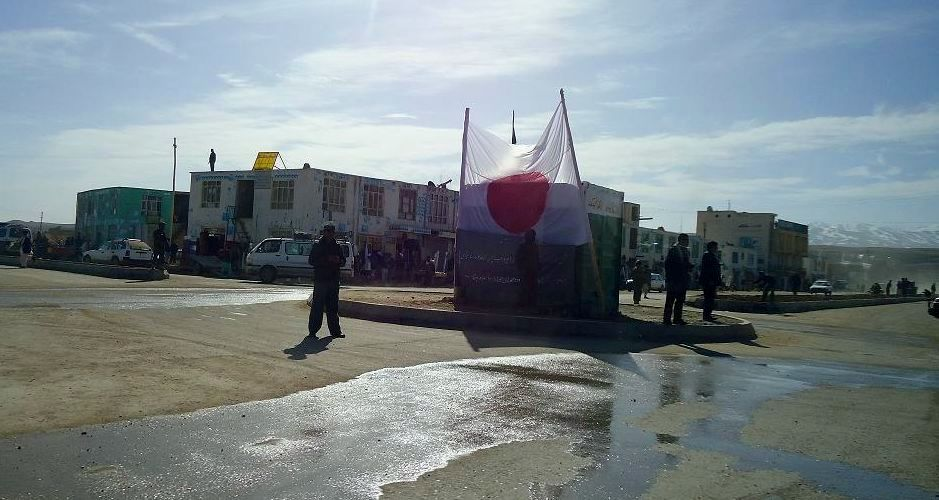
A Japanese flag erected by locals in Afghanistan for sympathy and condolences to the victims

- The Japan Center for International Exchange finds that individuals, groups, and corporations in the United States have donated at least $746 million for relief and recovery efforts, the third highest philanthropic outpouring from American donors for any overseas disaster and the most for any disaster in another rich country.
- Local Soka Gakkai facilities became refugee shelters and distribution centers for relief supplies. Efforts also included worldwide fundraising for the victims, youth groups, and spiritual support.
- A fundraising concert and show in Taiwan attended by some 300 Taiwanese singers and celebrities raised US$26 million for Japan relief.
- The Jewish Federations of North America and the American Jewish Joint Distribution Committee raised more than US$2 million. They are working with the Jewish community of Tokyo and JEN, a Japanese NGO, to provide relief to the residents in the Tohoku region. In association with Israel Defense Forces, JDC set up the a field hospital on the ground in Minamisanriko.
- The Roman Catholic Church provided large outreach and prayer for the victims of the disaster and offered large monetary donations from local parishes and churches, along with aid from the Vatican and a call for unity by Pope Benedict.
- The United Methodist Committee on Relief has a team responded to the disaster.
- The Disciples of Christ Church respond to needs through a Week of Compassion.
- The Church of Jesus Christ of Latter-day Saints has committed "Substantial financial help" to Japan. The Church also provided equipment to Japanese fisherman who were unable to work since the earthquake.
- The UUA/Unitarian Service Committee (UUSC) Japan Relief Fund has been established to support the recovery efforts in Japan, as they consider the specific efforts to take to support the work of recovery.
- The N.C. Baptist Men's search and rescue team is in Japan assessing needs and distributing food.
- A Samaritan's Purse disaster relief team has arrived in Japan and provide relief supplies to affected residents.
- The volunteer medical assistance team in Canada sent a portable field hospital, medical supplies, and medical personnel. Several non-governmental agencies such as the Canadian Red Cross and the Humanitarian Coalition have also collected funds from citizens towards relief efforts in Japan.
- The Philippine National Red Cross raised ₱73,336,619.74 (in addition to US$10,000 and ¥30,000) in donations, for a total that exceeded $1.6M.
- Relief organizations and local civic groups in South Korea such as the Korean Disaster Relief Association, UNICEF, and the Korean Community Chest set up campaigns to collect donations and aid supplies. Business groups such as Samsung Group, South Korea's largest business conglomerate, said it has donated 100 million yen (US$1.22 million) to help Japan's earthquake relief.
- Charitable organizations in Hong Kong such as The Salvation Army, Hong Kong Red Cross, and various student groups have accepted donations for relief efforts.
- Charitable organizations in Taiwan such as the Red Cross Society of the Republic of China and the Tzu Chi Foundation launched efforts to raise more funds for relief aid.
- Public efforts in Thailand include several charity organizations, fund-raising drives and donation through television and mobile phone networks. Three big mobile phone networks enabled subscribers to raise money by sending text messages to specific numbers, with the network providers then passing on the revenue to the fund-raising drive. Organizations in Phuket, where the 2004 Asian tsunami struck, such as Bangkok Hospital Phuket have set up donation drives for non-perishable items such as blankets, canned foods and children's essentials.
- Numerous NGOs in the United States have contributed to the relief efforts in Japan. Influential business organizations have also made large donations for near-term relief and recovery efforts (e.g. Walmart committed US$5 million in cash and in-kind donations . JPMorgan Chase committed US$5 million). Mobile network services such as AT&T have also offered conditional free phone calls from the United States and Puerto Rico to Japan until March 31, 2011. The American Red Cross, The Salvation Army, the International Medical Corps and a number of other nonprofit organisations have launched mobile donation efforts with groups such as the Give Foundation, the Mobile Giving Foundation, and Mobile Cause to provide aid for those affected. Among the US-based celebrities to have made major donations is Ichiro Suzuki, a Japanese baseball superstar with the Seattle Mariners, who donated ¥100 million ($1.24 million) to the Japanese Red Cross toward the relief effort.
- ShelterBox, a disaster relief charity, has provided emergency accommodation to nearly 1600 families, in response to initial requests by Iwate Prefecture authorities for accommodation for 1000 refugees at each of the towns Miyako, Yamada, Kamaishi, Rikuzentakata and Ofunato. The charity has stated it can provide a further 5000 "Shelterboxes" to accommodate another 50,000 people if required.
- World Vision Japan, partnering with Delta Air Lines transported aid workers and relief supplies to Japan. Delta frequent flyer's SkyMiles card holders could donate their miles to World Vision Japan, collectively 5 million miles were donated. Additionally World Vision partnership across the globe is appealing for $10 million to fund its response in Japan, which may continue for several years. World Vision staff planned to focus their attention on providing vital relief supplies and Child-Friendly Spaces.
- Mercy Corps worked in devastated areas of northeastern Japan alongside local partner (Peace Winds Japan) to bring relief and recovery to survivors. In the weeks after the earthquake and tsunami, the two organizations focused on providing relief items – tents, tarps, blankets, heaters, clothes, water, food and school and hygiene supplies – to survivors. As supplies of essential items have become more accessible, efforts have shifted to economic recovery and post-trauma work. Together, Mercy Corps and Peace Winds Japan projects have helped to support 148,000 people in need who live in four northeastern towns: Ofunato, Rikuzentakata, Kesennuma and Minamisanriku.
- Numerous charitable organizations in Singapore have offered to raise funds to the relief efforts for Japan. Mercy Relief has collected S$722,000, including a cheque by the Singapore Soka Association to help aid workers in Japan to purchase relief supplies such as food, blankets and drinking water. It had a five-member team in Japan distributing relief supplies to victims near Iwate Prefecture. World Vision Singapore has also collected more than S$400,000 thus far.
- The music industry's four largest record labels (EMI, Sony, Universal, and Warner) collaborated to make Songs for Japan. All proceeds generated from this charity record will go to the Japanese Red Cross Society.
- On March 23, 2011, Music for Relief, a charity founded in 2005 by rock band Linkin Park, also released another compilation of albums called Download to Donate: Tsunami Relief, released under Warner Bros. Records. The proceeds will go to Save the Children for the victims of the disasters.
- Team Fortress 2 players donated US$430,543.65 to Japan through an in-game hat donation campaign by Valve.
- ChildFund Japan distributed emergency supplies to evacuation centers in Natori and Sendai. The emergency supplies included masks, propane gas, diapers, powdered milk, rice canned food, noodles, and seasoning.
- A group of seven independent Scottish Whisky Distilleries are collaborating to produce a one-time limited bottling of blended single malt whisky and to donate all proceeds to disaster relief efforts in Japan. Each distillery will donate a cask of their single malt, which will be blended together and named the Spirit of Unity. Production is expected to be roughly 2,000 bottles; 1,200 being sold in the UK, and the remainder being sold in Japan. A small quantity will be sold in New Zealand with proceeds being donated to relief efforts in the wake of the February 2011 Christchurch earthquake. The total proceeds of this initiative are estimated to be at least US$80,000. The collaborating distillers are: Arran, BenRiach, Bladnoch, GlenDronach, Mitchell's Glengyle, Kilchoman and Springbank.
- The Japanese Federation of the Deaf and Disabled Persons International were among those helping with relief efforts for those with special needs and disabilities.
- VANK, a South Korean NGO that often contests against Japan, donated 10,000,000 won (US$9000) to the victims on March 16.
- Anime Detour, a Minneapolis-St. Paul based convention with 4,500 attendees held yearly holds a charity auction every year. With the earthquake and tsunami in Japan a month before the 2011 Convention the group that holds Anime Detour had all the funds of the charity auction sent to the Red Cross for Japan Relief Effort as well as donation boxes located around the convention. Anime Detour raised $36,243.84 during the three-day convention for the relief efforts.
- The Polish catholic organization Caritas gathered 3,057,370 PLN for victims in Japan. Polska Akcja Humanitarna gathered 700,000 PLN. All the Polish Catholic bishops appealed for help in their dioceses. Donations were collected on Sunday 27 March. There were multiple concerts and collection in aid of tsunami victims.
- The North Korean Chongryon-affiliated Fukushima Korean School sheltered 18 Japanese citizens from March 18 until the end of March.
- Japan's three largest professional wrestling promotions, All Japan Pro Wrestling, New Japan Pro-Wrestling and Pro Wrestling Noah, came together on August 27, 2011, in Tokyo, for a charity event named All Together, raising $769,211 for the earthquake victims relief fund. A second All Together event was held on February 19, 2012, in Sendai.
- Riot Games donated US$160,000 to the American Red Cross in response to this disaster by hosting a special sale of Akali, a character in League of Legends whose design was based on Japanese culture.
- Rogers Communications a major Canadian ISP and Cable television provider unlocked all restrictions for Japanese channels for non subscribers and customers for a week following the disaster to allow loved ones to get around the hour coverage from Japanese news stations to assist loved ones with information on relatives and areas effected, they also provided a text number to pledge 5CAD donation toward disaster relief.
- The website Something Awful held a fundraiser of sorts that started after posters in their message boards got tired of a user trying to use them as help for his homework, saying they would donate if the user was banned. It later added a head-shaving portion and a blood drive. At least $70,000 was donated to charity, $1,750 in shaved heads and 30 pints of blood was ultimately given.
- Sanrio and Ty came up with a special Hello Kitty beanie baby. She is dressed as a nurse. On her pinafore is the Japanese flag. Underneath the red sun, the text reads "I [Heart] Japan". Proceeds from the sale of each plush toy was donated to the American Red Cross for Japan disaster relief.
- Right after the disaster, Direct Relief, an emergency response organization, and the Japanese American Citizens League established the Japan Relief and Recovery Fund where they committed 100 percent of all contributions to be used exclusively to help people in Japan in the most productive, efficient manner possible.

== Corporate donations ==
Total corporate donations were US$130,008,543.

Company	Country	Cash donation in US$	Goods donation	Employee matching donation	Comment
Softbank	Japan	12,500,000	Donated phone handsets to tsunami orphans and pay their phone bills until the children turn 18		¥1 billion to the Japanese Red Cross
Nippon Telegraph and Telephone	Japan	12,000,000			NTT provided its communication services free of charge, safety confirmation information of those affected, and company residences as living space for those impacted by the earthquake. NTT Group is working to gather donations from its customer
Samsung Group	South Korea	7,700,000	Clothes and communications equipment		
NCSoft	South Korea	6,300,000			1 Month billing revenue
Mitsubishi Electric	Japan	6,170,000	Company products and goods	Matched employee donations	
Pak Suzuki Motors	Pakistan	244,678	Company products and goods	Matched employee donations	
Goldman Sachs	United States	6,100,000		Matched employee donations, up to $20,000 per donor	Donation to the Japanese Red Cross Society, Peace Winds Japan, Save the Children Japan and Médecins Sans Frontières
JP Morgan	United States	5,000,000			
Panasonic	Japan	3,700,000	Radios, flashlights, solar LED lanterns, batteries	Matched employee donations	
Sony	Japan	3,600,000		Matched employee donations	Additional to the 30,000 radios and flashlights which have a combined total of US$100,000
Nintendo	Japan	3,600,000	Nintendo Wiis to the children affected		
Suntory	Japan	3,600,000	One million 550ml bottles of Suntory Natural Mineral Water (360,000 bottles already shipped on March 12)		
Toyota	Japan	3,600,000			Considered further provision of goods and services as needed. Toyota has also (as of 2011) moved all RHD production of the Toyota Aqua at Toyota Motors Tohoku in order to provide economic development for the region in the form of jobs and engineering support professions.
Hitachi	Japan	3,600,000			
Honda	Japan	3,600,000	1,000 generators (gasoline-powered and home-use gas canister-powered), along with 5,000 gas canisters		
Daimler	Germany	2,840,000			
Morgan Stanley	United States	2,740,000		Matched employee donations	Morgan Stanley Japan employees contributed US$600,000, matched by the firm. A further US$410,000 has been contributed by Morgan Stanley employees outside Japan. Total employee donations, donation matching and firm contributions have totaled to over US$2,470,000 to the Japanese Red Cross.
Walt Disney Company	United States	2,500,000		Matched employee donations, up to $1 million, to the Red Cross Japan Earthquake and Pacific Tsunami Fund and Save the Children	Donation to the American Red Cross.
Sega	Japan	2,400,000			
Barclays	United Kingdom	2,400,000			Donation to the British Red Cross
Citigroup	United States	2,400,000			
Microsoft	United States	2,000,000			In addition to $250,000 in cash as well as in-kind contributions such as software.
Nestle	Switzerland	1,500,000	Donated 20,000 cases of bottled water, half of which were allocated to area hospitals.		
L'Oréal	France	1,300,000			Donation to the Japan Red Cross
Société Générale	France	1,200,000		Matched employee donations	Donation to the French Red Cross.
Namco	Japan	1,200,000			
Bank of America	United States	1,200,000			
Nexon	South Korea	1,200,000			
Nomura	Japan	1,200,000			
Square Enix	Japan	1,200,000			
Jefferies & Company	United States	1,000,000	All net equity trading revenue for the entire week from its offices in Asia and all net revenues from US and European equity trading of Wednesday March 16 would be donated		Employees were given the opportunity to donate to the relief effort their salary of Wednesday March 16.
Nike	United States	1,000,000	$250,000 worth of footwear and clothing		
Air Liquide	France	1,000,000			
FedEx	United States	1,000,000			Transportation and logistics supplied to support relief work.
HSBC	United Kingdom	500,000			
Valve	United States	430,543			Funds from selling of five specific in-game items through Team Fortress 2's Mann Co. Store, which was transferred to the American Red Cross. Current number includes funds from March 21 to April 7.
Mazda	Japan	360,000			
Nissan	Japan	360,000			
Russell Investments	United States	125,000			
Tecmo Koei	Japan	122,000			
Spin Master	Canada	100,000			Donation to the Canadian Red Cross and to IsraAid.
Lloyd	United Kingdom	81,000			Equivalent of 3.5% of the bonus of former CEO
Johnny & Associates	Japan		2,000 L of diesel fuel and free use of the company's delivery trucks for the delivery of relief goods		
Fuji Television	Japan	12,000,000			
Avex Group Holdings	Japan	1,200,000			
Sony Music Entertainment, Universal Music Group, Warner Music Group, EMI	United States; United Kingdom		all proceeds from Songs for Japan		Donated to the Japanese Red Cross
Riot Games	United States	160,000			Funds from a special sale of Akali, a character from League of Legends whose design inspirations were drawn from Japan, and all proceeds from the sale were donated to the American Red Cross.

== Private donations ==
Name	Country	Title	Donation in US$	Comment
Masayoshi Son	Japan	CEO of Softbank	120,000,000	¥10 billion donation to the Japanese Red Cross Society and other nonprofit organizations. Son, 53, will also donate all of his annual salary each year to aid organizations until he retires (his 2010 salary was $1.3 million)
AKB48	Japan	Idol Group	12,700,000	The group donated personal salaries and issued a single for charity purposes titled "Dareka no Tame ni (What Can I Do for Someone?)", of which, all profits were donated to the earthquake and tsunami relief fund – ¥1,254,175,973.
Chang Yung-fa	Taiwan	Chairman of the Evergreen Group	12,350,000	Donated ¥1 billion
Kyosuke Himuro	Japan	Musician	8,700,000	Donated ¥669,220,940 to Fukushima, Miyagi, and Iwate prefectures.
Arashi	Japan	Idol Group	3,800,000	Inclusive of personal salaries and all proceeds from their charity work – waku waku and 'Nippon no Arashi'.
Jackie Chan	Hong Kong	Actor	3,000,000	Raised over $3 million to Japan at a charity concert in Hong Kong. The money was donated to The Salvation Army to help deliver emergency relief supplies to victims of the disaster.
Gackt	Japan	Singer	2,641,564	Donation via charity founded by him. In March 2011, was sent a track convoy with 72,000 lb (33,000 kg) of food and clothes. All money collected through bank transfers and street fundraising activities was on April 6 transferred to the Japanese Red Cross, sum of ¥208,181,735 (or US$2,641,564 ).
Ryo Ishikawa	Japan	Golfer	2,500,000	Donated all of his tournament winnings in 2011 to earthquake relief, plus an additional ¥100,000 for every birdie he made in 2011 tournament play. His personal goal is to reach ¥200 million ($2.5 million/£1.5 million) in tournament winnings; it is estimated that if he matches his performance since turning professional in 2008, his donation could reach £2 million.
Lady Gaga	United States	Singer	1,500,000	Funds raised from the selling of the charity bracelet she designed.
Yuzuru Hanyu	Japan	Figure skater	1,340,000	Donated the full prize money of his Olympic wins from 2014 (¥6 million; $55,000) and 2018 (¥10 million; $92,000) to his hometown of Sendai and Miyagi Prefecture. Donated all royalties and a part of the proceeds of his autobiography series Blue Flames I–IV (¥87.3 million; $617,000) for the rebuilding of Ice Rink Sendai. Sold his skates and belongings, fundraising additional ¥2.95 million ($35,000) in 2011 and ¥7.12 million ($64,000) in 2019. Raised $150,000 at ice shows in 2011 in collaboration with other skaters. Raised ¥42.7 million ($325,000) for reconstructions at the "2022 Yuzuru Hanyu Exhibition", organized by Yomiuri Shimbun (¥156 million in total). Donations of the proceeds from official goods sales of the annual Yuzuru Hanyu Notte Stellata ice show and various charity activities have not been disclosed.
Ichiro Suzuki	Japan	Baseball player of the Seattle Mariners	1,240,000	Donation of ¥100 million to the Japanese Red Cross.
Takanori Nishikawa	Japan	Musician, singer, songwriter, record producer, actor	1,090,000	Created the charity project 「STAND UP！JAPAN」.
Daisuke Matsuzaka	Japan	Baseball player of the Boston Red Sox	1,000,000	Donation to the Japanese Red Cross Society's relief efforts.
Sandra Bullock	United States	Actress	1,000,000	Donation to the American Red Cross.
Gwen Stefani	United States	Singer	1,000,000	Donation to Save the Children's Japan Earthquake-Tsunami Children in Emergency Fund.
Hikaru Utada	Japan	Singer	970,000	Donated ¥80,000,000, quoting that others should donate where they can.
Norika Fujiwara	Japan	Actress, model	757,000	Donated to the Japanese Red Cross
Hideki Matsui	Japan	Baseball player of the Oakland Athletics	600,000	Donation of ¥50 million to the Japanese Red Cross.
Prince Frederik	Denmark	Royalty	271,000	Donated ¥22 million acquired through Danish firms, along with 2,400 pairs of shoes.
Yoshiki	Japan	Musician	135,000	Auctioned his crystal piano, and it was sold for ¥11 million.
flumpool	Japan	Music band	123,000	Donated to the Japanese Red Cross through the band's agency
Iron Maiden	United Kingdom	Music band	57,000	Donated to the Japanese Red Cross. The band and their crew were flying into Tokyo from Seoul, South Korea, following their show there, as part of The Final Frontier World Tour. On approaching Narita airport in Tokyo, Iron Maiden's specially chartered Ed Force One was advised to re-route to Nagoya. Their shows, scheduled to take place on Saturday, March 12 and Sunday, March 13 at Saitama Super Arena, had to be canceled.
Breakerz	Japan	Music band	40,482	Results of their fundraising event at Zepp Tokyo, and donated to the Japanese Red Cross
United States women's national soccer team	United States	Sports team	20,597	Donated proceeds of an online auction of game-worn jerseys, autographed by all players and head coach Pia Sundhage ( (Sweden) ), to the American Red Cross and earmarked for tsunami relief. The black jerseys, part of the team's new kit, debuted during the team's friendly match against Japan on May 14 in Columbus, Ohio, the first for Japan since the earthquake.
Queen Elizabeth II	United Kingdom	Monarch		Undisclosed personal donation to Japan.
Ryuichi Sakamoto	Japan	Composer, pianist, producer and actor		A School Music Revival Fund was established by him in July 2011 to provide free repair of musical instruments to schools in areas affected by the disaster. In 2014 he founded the Tohoku Youth Orchestra, which he directed and supervised, to provide children in the Tohoku region with opportunities to grow through music.
Clint Eastwood	United States	Actor		Donated the film Hereafter's DVD sales to relief efforts.
Shakira	Colombia	Singer		Donated time and effort to relief-fund for Japan, and donated an undisclosed amount directly to Japan. She also included her 2001 hit Whenever, Wherever on Songs for Japan
L'Arc-en-Ciel	Japan	Music band		All proceeds from their 2-day 20th anniversary concert held at Ajinomoto Stadium.
My Chemical Romance	United States	Music band		Donated profits from a remix of their single Sing
The Black Eyed Peas	United States	Music band		Donated profits from their newly released song, Just Can't Get Enough. The music video for the song was filmed in Japan before the disaster.
Feeder	United Kingdom	Music band		Donated profits from their newly released single Side By Side
Crush 40	United States; Japan	Music band		Donated profits from their first single, Song of Hope.
Veronica Vitale "Ivee"	Italy	Singer, Songwriter		Donated time and effort to relief-fund for Japan with IFRC, and Donated profits from her newly released single Il Cielo and Turn Off on Songs for Japan, Newscomers's Help
Mai Kuraki	Japan	Singer		She held a charity concert at the Nippon Budokan where part of the proceeds were donated. In addition, she also donated profits from her first DVD single "Strong Heart", which was released November 23, 2011.
KARA	South Korea	Music group		Donated profits from their single Jet Coaster Love.
Girls' Generation	South Korea	Music group		Donated profits from their newly released single, Mr. Taxi / Run Devil Run.

== See also ==
- Hideaki Akaiwa
- Songs for Japan
- Yuzuru Hanyu Notte Stellata
