= Starlux Airlines =

Airline of Taiwan

STARLUX Airlines 星宇航空

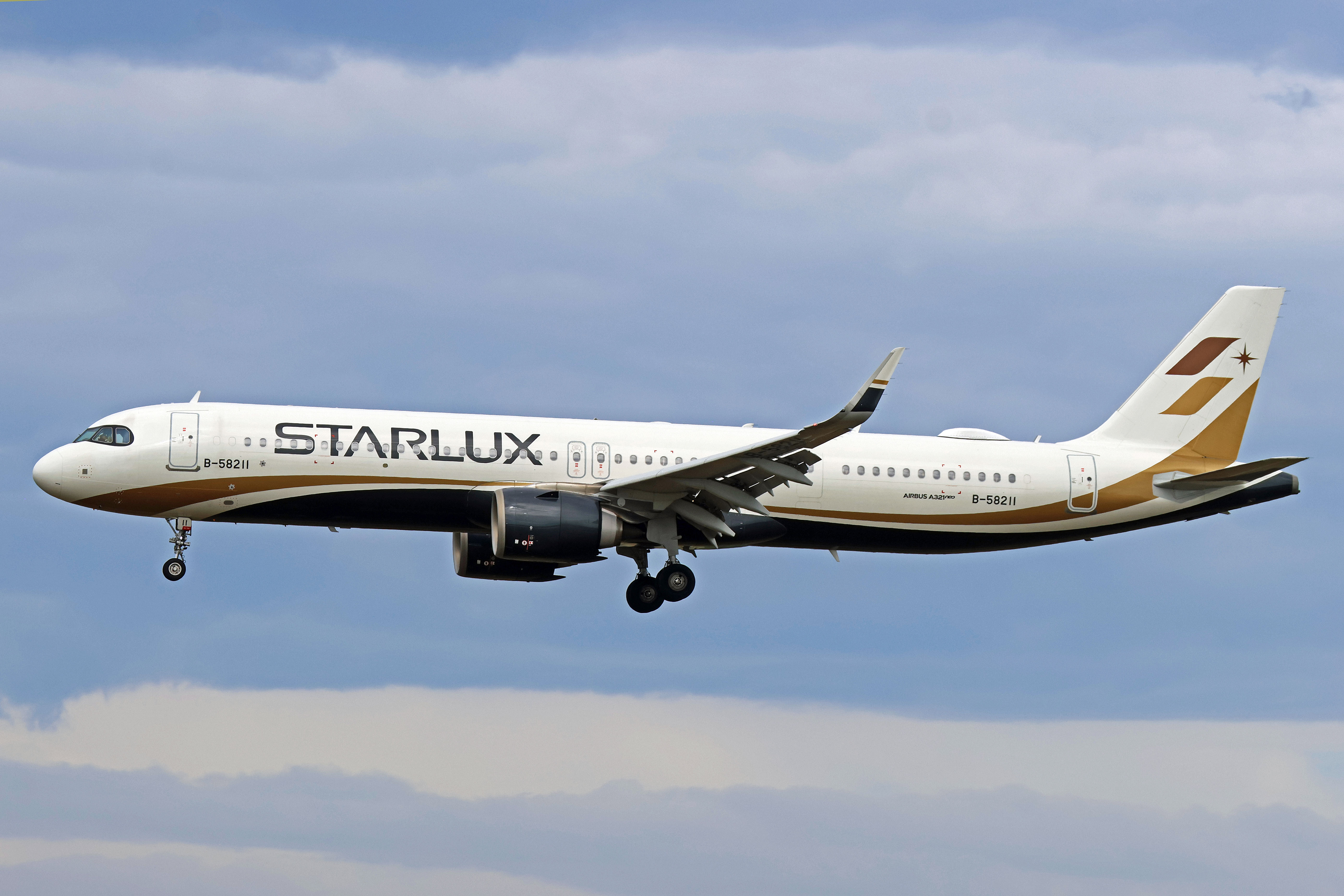
- A STARLUX Airlines Airbus A321neo
IATA	ICAO	Call sign
JX	SJX	STARWALKER
- Founded: 2 May 2018; 8 years ago
- Commenced operations: 23 January 2020; 6 years ago
- AOC #: SJX-01
- Hubs: Taoyuan International Airport
- Focus cities: Taichung International Airport
- Frequent-flyer program: Cosmile
- Fleet size: 34
- Destinations: 37
- Traded as: TWSE: 2646
- Headquarters: Taipei, Taiwan
- Key people: Chang Kuo-wei (founder & chairman); Glenn Chai (general manager & CEO)
- Revenue: ▲NT$ 44.05 billion (2025)
- Operating income: ▲NT$ 1.63 billion (2025)
- Total assets: ▲NT$ 137 billion (2025)
- Total equity: ▲NT$ 31.39 billion (2025)
- Employees: 6,224 (As of 31 March 2026)
- Website: www.starlux-airlines.com

Starlux Airlines (Chinese: 星宇航空; pinyin: Xīngyǔ Hángkōng, styled STARLUX) is a Taiwanese full service carrier headquartered in Taipei. It was established in 2018 by Chang Kuo-wei, who also served as Captain of its maiden flight on 23 January 2020. Starlux is one of three major international airlines operating in Taiwan, along with China Airlines and EVA Air. Taoyuan International Airport is its hub airport.

== History ==
The company name "STARLUX" is derived from the Chinese character "星宇," named by the founder Chang Kuo-wei. The character "星" (star) refers to his father, Chang Yung-fa, founder of the Evergreen Group, who used to navigate by looking at the stars before the advent of GPS. The character "宇" (universe) reflects Chang Kuo-wei's own aspirations. Together, these characters symbolize the company's hope to soar into the universe without limits.

The company was registered in 2016 with the Taiwanese Ministry of Economic Affairs. Chang Kuo-wei, the former chairman of rival Taiwanese airline EVA Air and the son of Evergreen's founder, confirmed the registration on 30 November 2016. The airline registered with the Taiwanese Civil Aeronautics Administration in the first half of 2017, and it was planned in late 2016 that the airline would commence operations in 2018. The Taiwanese Ministry of Economic Affairs received the formal application for establishing the airline under the name "Starlux Airlines" on 22 May 2017. In an interview in 2017, the airline was expected to start operations by the end of 2019, though in January 2019, Chang stated that Starlux would launch in January 2020.

In March 2019, Chang signed an order for 17 Airbus A350 XWB aircraft, which was also the country's largest single Airbus purchase agreement. In September 2019, the airline announced the first destinations to be launched, consisting of Da Nang, Macau, and Penang to begin on 23 January 2020. On 25 October 2019, the airline's first aircraft, an Airbus A321neo, was delivered from Hamburg, Germany, arriving at Taoyuan International Airport on 29 October after stops in Dubai and Bangkok. On 10 December 2019, Starlux received its air operator's certificate (AOC) from the Taiwanese Civil Aeronautics Administration, followed by the formal opening of reservations on 16 December 2019 for the start of services the following month.

Due to the COVID-19 pandemic and its impacts on aviation, which began to occur within months of the airline's inauguration, Starlux announced the suspension of most of its services except to Da Nang. Subsequently, in March 2020 the airline suspended all of its operations until 2 June 2020, after which the airline resumed its three-weekly services to Macau. Before the airline resumed service, it received clearance in May 2020 to begin services to Naha as its first destination in Japan, with a start date no earlier than 1 July, but the airline said that the timeline for Naha's service inauguration depended on the pandemic's developments. Subsequently, due to the pandemic, the airline additionally delayed the launch of its Cebu services twice, and indefinitely postponed the launch of its services to Naha.

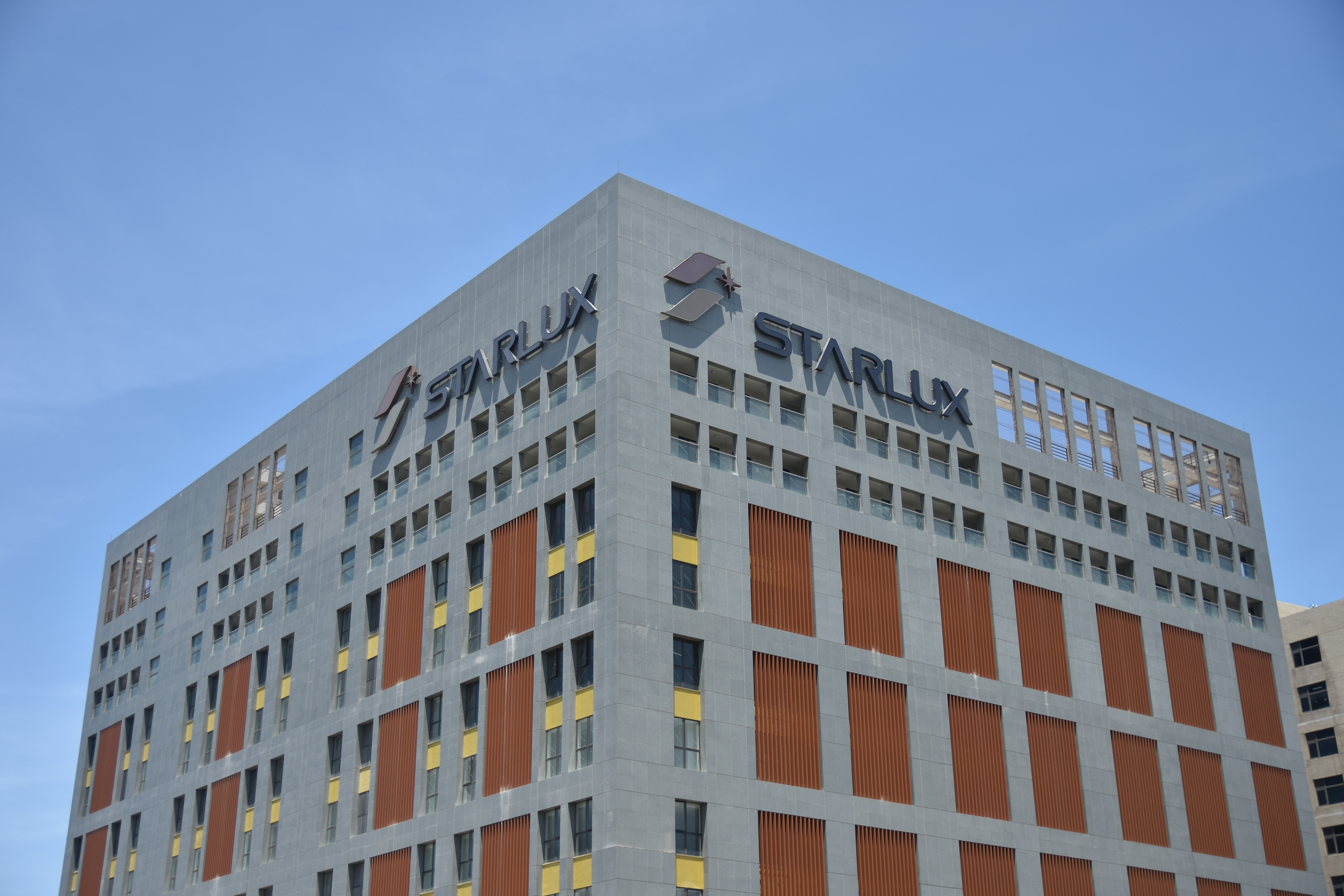
Starlux Airlines office in Taoyuan, Taiwan

In August 2022, Starlux announced its plan to expand its services to North America in April 2023 as the travel industry started to recover from the impacts of the COVID-19 pandemic, along with services to Indonesia in the future. In September 2022, the airline announced its strategy to connect Southeast Asian cities to the U.S. via Taipei Taoyuan Airport.

In February 2023, the airline confirmed its plans to introduce North American services, with regular flights to Los Angeles set for 26 April 2023, following the delivery of the first two Airbus A350s in October 2022.

In March 2023, Starlux announced a multi-year sponsorship with the NBA's Los Angeles Clippers team. Starting from June 2023, Clipper-branded in-flight amenities will be available on the Starlux LAX - TPE route.

In April 2023, Starlux announced a strategic partnership with Alaska Airlines, enabling travelers to earn rewards through the other airline's loyalty program and book connecting flights on a single ticket. Both Starlux and Alaska Airlines expanded their partnership following US DOT's approval of codesharing in July 2024 and its first flight to Seattle in August 2024. The airline partnered with Hong Kong Tramways in anticipation of its Taoyuan–Chek Lap Kok route in mid July 2024.

In December 2023, Starlux celebrated the opening of a new office in Taichung, with future plans to operate out of Taichung International Airport in the second quarter of 2024.

On 14 June 2024, the founder and chairperson of Starlux Airlines, Chang Kuo-wei, confirmed that the airline had been pursuing Oneworld membership. The airline has been a codeshare partner of Oneworld member Alaska Airlines since March 2023. The CEO of Oneworld, Nat Pieper, played down the possibility of Starlux's membership. Business Weekly, a local Taiwanese business magazine, indicated that Cathay Pacific, one of the founding members of Oneworld whose destinations overlap with Starlux Airlines, is the main possible obstacle of its application.

On 16 September 2024, Starlux announced plans to apply to join the Oneworld alliance by the end of 2025. On 4 June 2025, Starlux announced a strategic codeshare agreement with Etihad Airways, enabling Starlux to reach the Middle East and Europe by codeshares on Etihad's flights from Taipei on a single itinerary, and vice versa.

=== Senior leadership ===
- Chairman: Chang Kuo-wei (since May 2018)
- Chief Executive: Glenn Chai (since May 2018)

== Destinations ==
As of January 2026, Starlux Airlines flies (or has flown) to the following destinations:

Country/territory	City	Airport	Notes	Ref
Australia	Sydney	Sydney Airport	Begins 2027	
Czech Republic	Prague	Václav Havel Airport Prague		
Guam	Hagåtña	Antonio B. Won Pat International Airport	Charter	
Hong Kong	Hong Kong	Hong Kong International Airport		
Indonesia	Denpasar	Ngurah Rai International Airport		
Indonesia	Jakarta	Soekarno–Hatta International Airport		
Japan	Fukuoka	Fukuoka Airport		
Japan	Hakodate	Hakodate Airport		
Japan	Kobe	Kobe Airport		
Japan	Kumamoto	Kumamoto Airport		
Japan	Nagoya	Chubu Centrair International Airport		
Japan	Naha	Naha Airport		
Japan	Osaka	Kansai International Airport		
Japan	Sapporo	New Chitose Airport		
Japan	Sendai	Sendai Airport		
Japan	Shimojishima	Shimojishima Airport		
Japan	Takamatsu	Takamatsu Airport		
Japan	Tokushima	Tokushima Airport	Charter	
Japan	Tokyo	Narita International Airport		
Macau	Macau	Macau International Airport		
Malaysia	Kuala Lumpur	Kuala Lumpur International Airport		
Malaysia	Penang	Penang International Airport	Terminated	
New Zealand	Auckland	Auckland Airport	Begins 23 March 2027	
Philippines	Cebu	Mactan–Cebu International Airport		
Philippines	Clark	Clark International Airport		
Philippines	Manila	Ninoy Aquino International Airport		
Singapore	Singapore	Changi Airport		
South Korea	Busan	Gimhae International Airport		
Taiwan	Kaohsiung	Kaohsiung International Airport	Begins 1 January 2027	
Taiwan	Taichung	Taichung International Airport	Focus city	
Taiwan	Taipei	Taoyuan International Airport	Hub	
Thailand	Bangkok	Suvarnabhumi Airport		
Thailand	Chiang Mai	Chiang Mai International Airport		
United States	Los Angeles	Los Angeles International Airport		
United States	Ontario	Ontario International Airport		
United States	Phoenix	Phoenix Sky Harbor International Airport		
United States	San Francisco	San Francisco International Airport		
United States	Seattle	Seattle–Tacoma International Airport		
Vietnam	Da Nang	Da Nang International Airport		
Vietnam	Hanoi	Noi Bai International Airport		
Vietnam	Ho Chi Minh City	Tan Son Nhat International Airport		
Vietnam	Phú Quốc	Phu Quoc International Airport		

=== Codeshare agreements ===
Starlux Airlines has codeshare agreements with the following airlines:

- Alaska Airlines
- American Airlines
- Etihad Airways

=== Interline agreements ===
Starlux Airlines has interline agreements with the following airlines:

- Air India
- American Airlines
- Finnair
- Hahn Air
- My Freighter Airlines
- Qantas
- Smartwings
- Taiwan High Speed Rail (railway)

== Fleet ==
=== Current fleet ===
As of April 2026, Starlux Airlines operates an all-Airbus fleet consisting of the following aircraft:

Starlux Airlines fleet
Aircraft	In service	Orders	Passengers					Notes	References
Aircraft	In service	Orders	F	C	W	Y	Total	Notes	References
Airbus A321neo	13	14	—	8	—	180	188	Thirteen aircraft are leased from GECAS, and six are leased from Air Lease Corporation. All aircraft are configured with Airbus Cabin Flex (ACF).	
Airbus A330-900	8	3	—	28	—	269	297	Five aircraft are leased from Air Lease Corporation and three are leased from Avolon. Delivery is expected to be completed between 2026 and 2027.	
Airbus A350-900	10	—	4	26	36	240	306	Delivery completed in 2025. B-58502 is leased from Air Lease Corporation.	
Airbus A350-1000	3	15	4	40	36	270	350		
Cargo fleet
Airbus A350F	—	10	Cargo					Deliveries expected to begin in 2028.	
Total	34	42							

=== Gallery ===
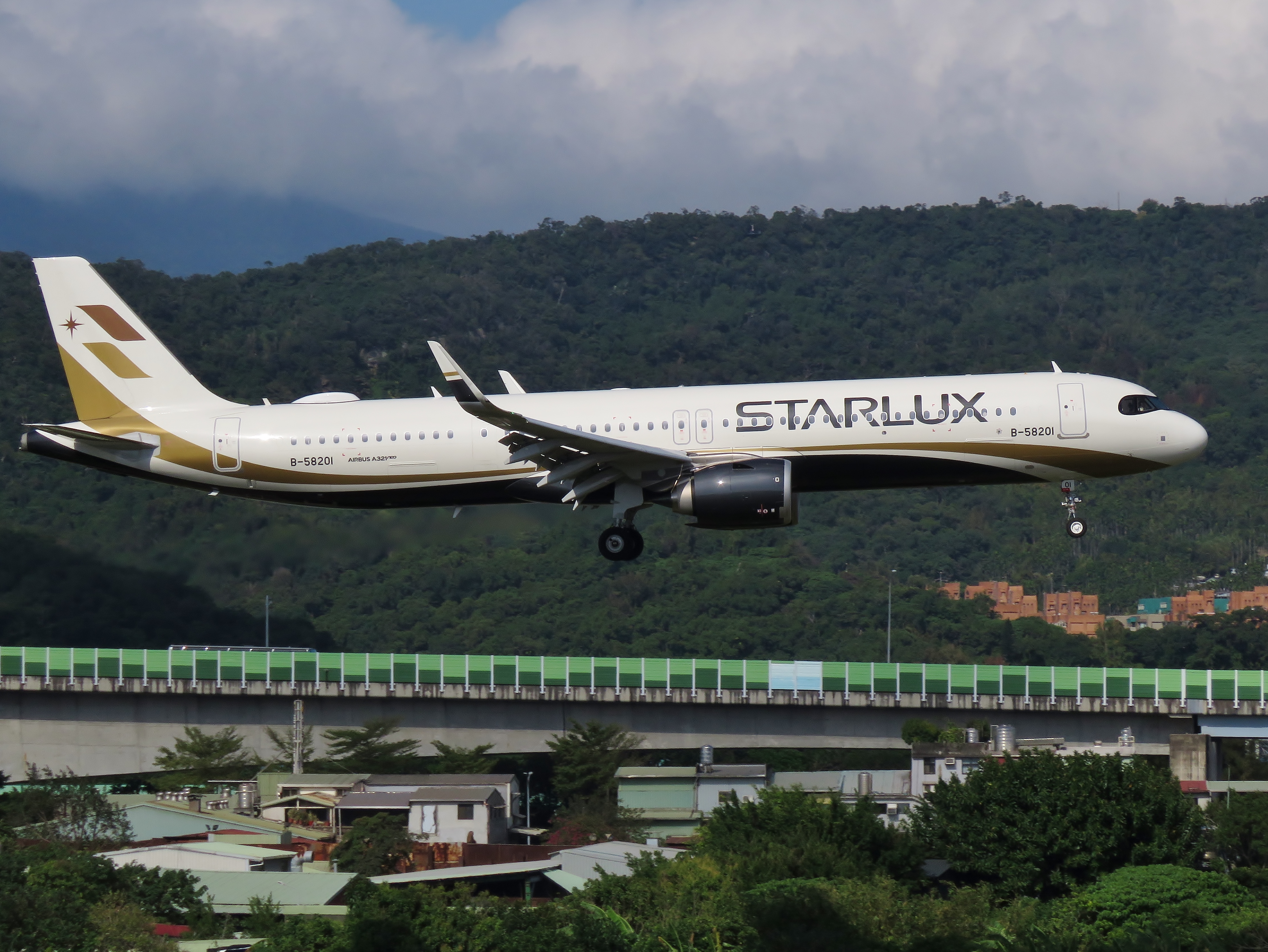
Airbus A321neo

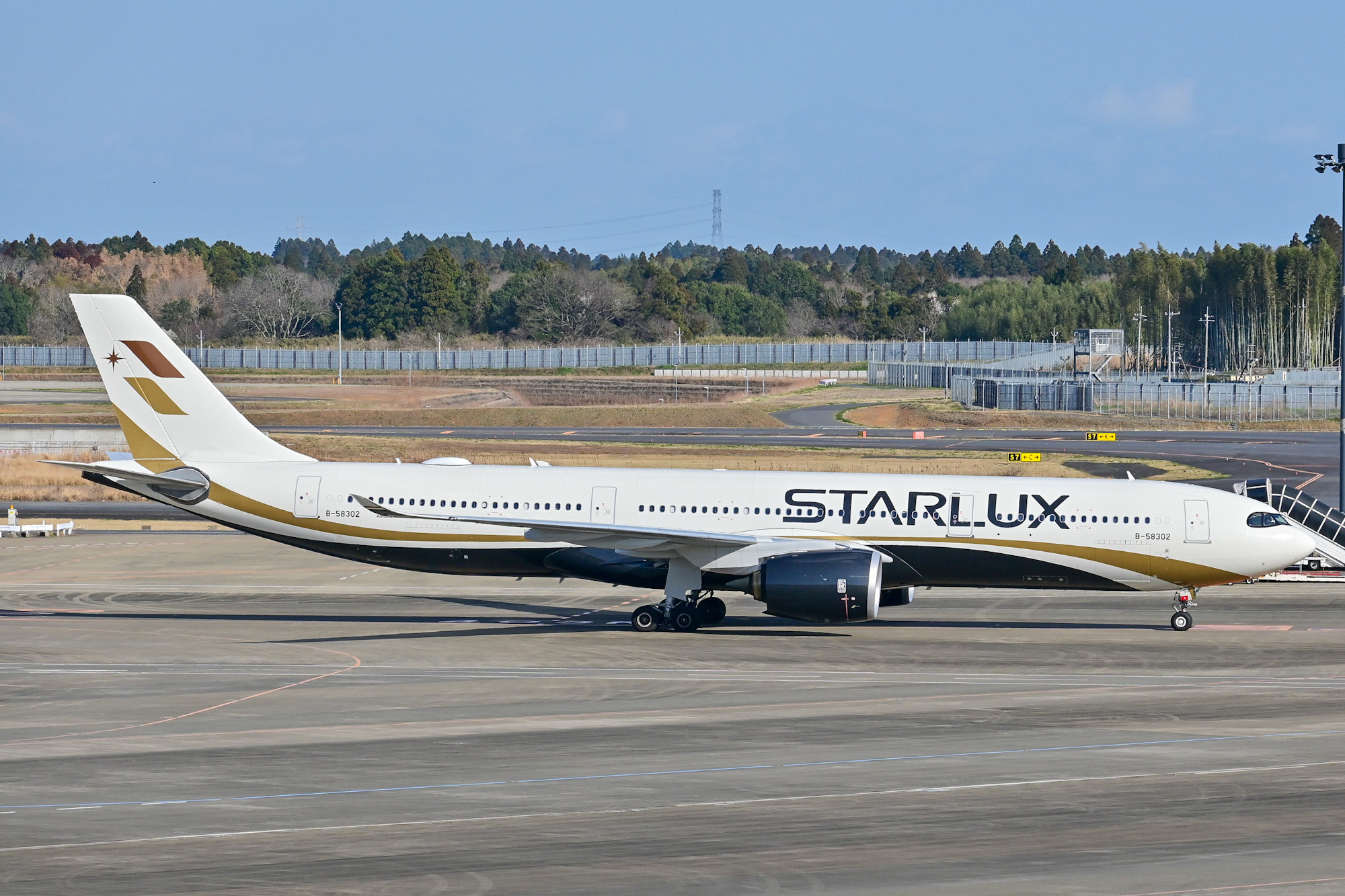
Airbus A330-900

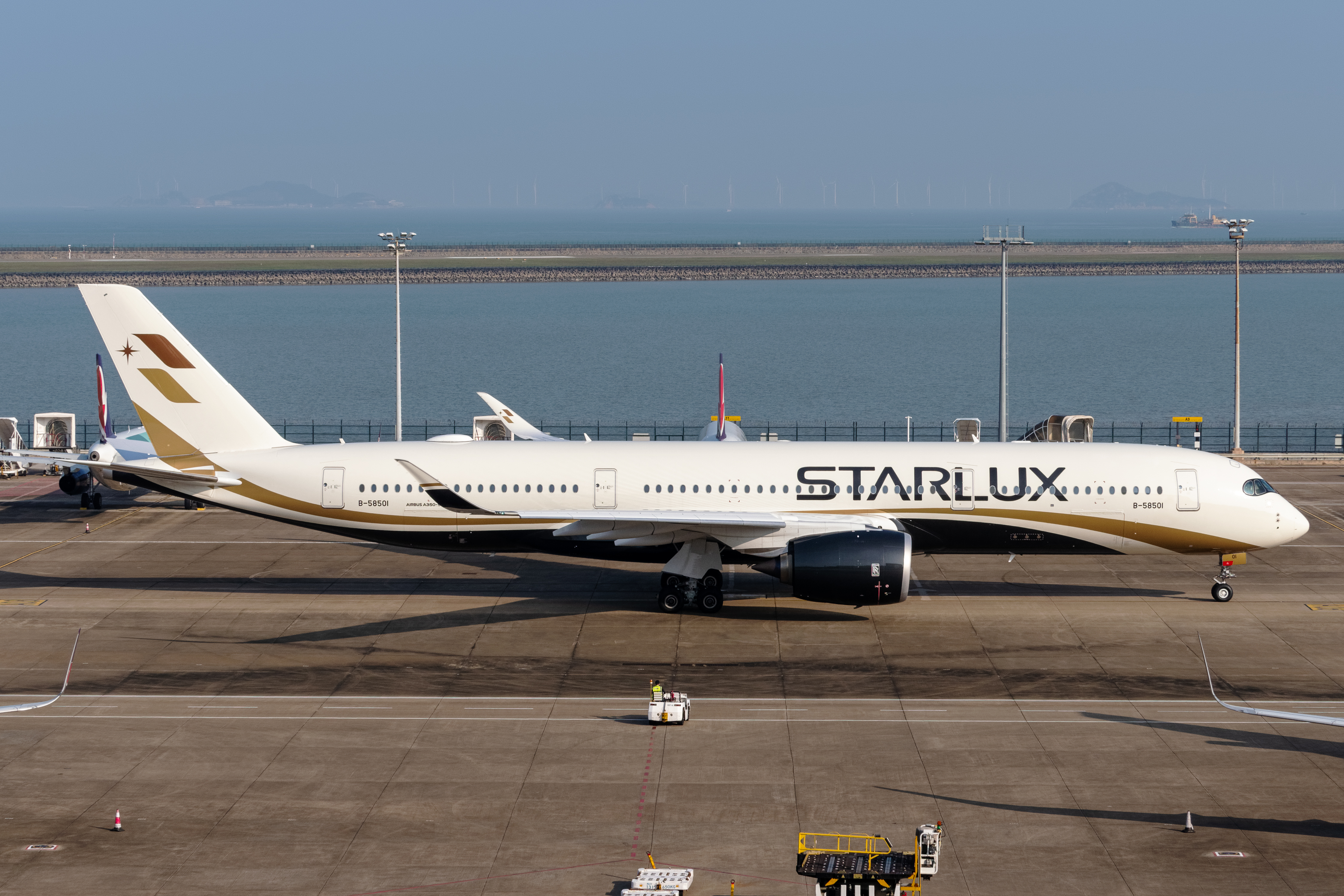
Airbus A350-900

Airbus A350-1000

=== Fleet development ===
In March 2019, Starlux announced it would start operations for select destinations in Asia, and to Europe and North America. Its inaugural fleet consisted of 17 Airbus aircraft, which included five Airbus A350-900s and 12 Airbus A350-1000s. The airline later planned to add 10 Airbus A321neos to its fleet to serve their Asian routes. In November 2019, Starlux decided to swap four Airbus A350-1000 orders to four A350-900s. Therefore, at the start of 2020, the orders stood at 9 A350-900s and 8 A350-1000s.

Starlux had also considered the addition of the Airbus A330neo to its fleet. This was followed by the airline placing an order for 8 Airbus A330-900s, alongside three additional A321neos and one leased A350-900 to its order backlog on 10 September 2020. Starlux also announced during September 2020 that its Airbus A350s would feature a first class cabin.

As part of the plans, Starlux was to become the first Taiwanese airline to fly the Airbus A321neo, Airbus A330-900, and Airbus A350-1000, but the remaining A350-1000 orders were later converted to the -900 variant instead. In October 2022, Starlux received their first Airbus A350-900 at Airbus Headquarters in Toulouse, France. Their chairman personally flew this aircraft back to Taiwan. The airline became the first to take delivery of the next generation of Airbus A350 aircraft, which notably features wider cabins and electronically tinted windows by default.

In late 2023, Starlux Airlines entered into a leasing agreement with Avolon Aerospace Leasing, an Irish lessor, acquiring three Airbus A330-900 aircraft, according to a filing submitted to the Taiwan stock exchange.

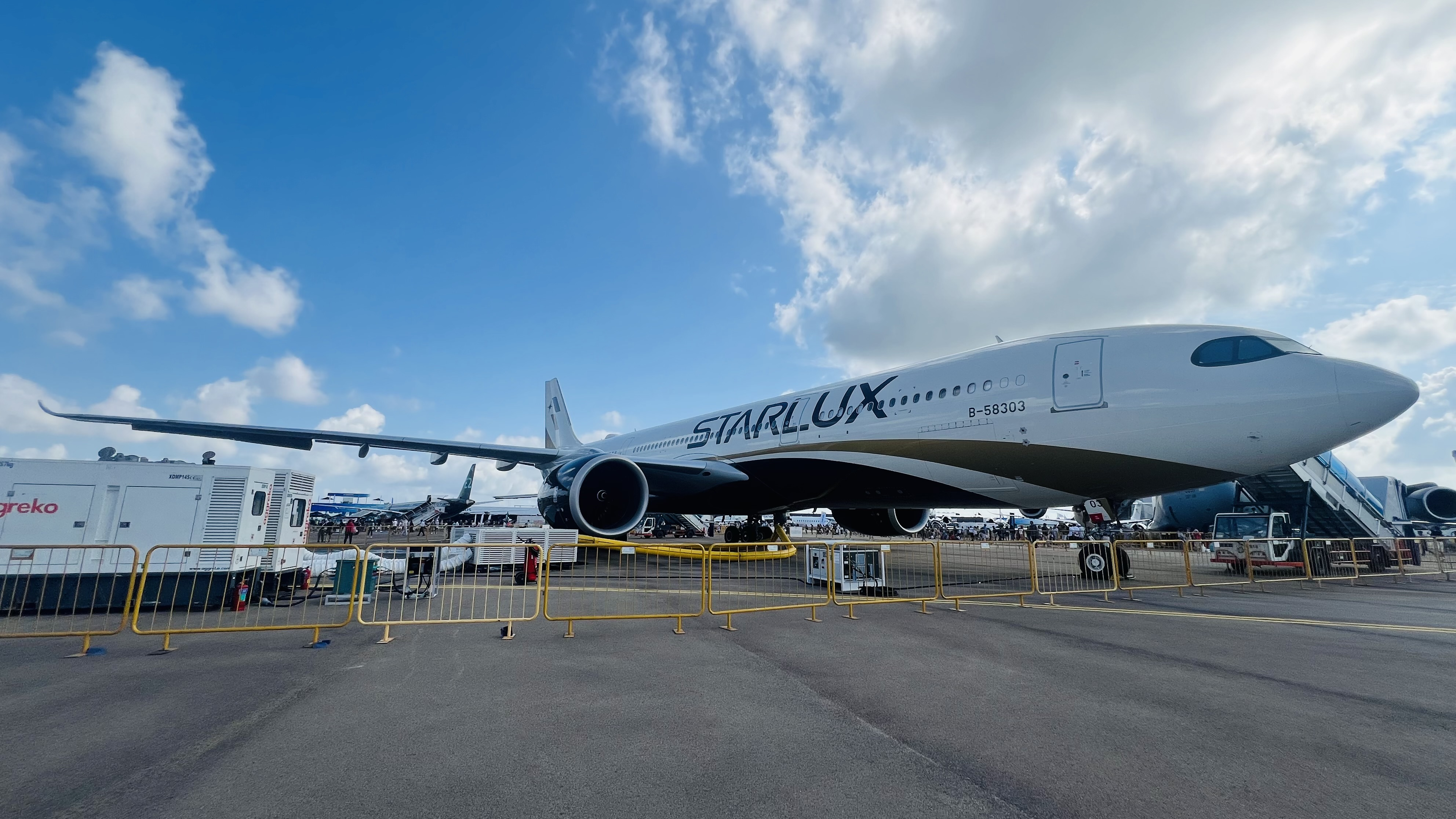
A330neo (B-58303) featured in the Airbus static display during the 2024 Singapore Airshow.

During the 2024 Singapore Airshow, Starlux finalised a deal to buy three additional A330neo aircraft and five new A350Fs (with options of five more A350F), marking its first purchase of freighters for the Starlux Cargo Division. The A350F order would later be increased by an additional five planes in January 2025. In addition, Starlux opted to revert the purchase order from 2020 to acquire eight A350-1000 aircraft for routes serving the east coast of the United States, as confirmed by Airbus Orders and Deliveries in January 2024.

In light of the increasing travel demands observed within the geographical regions of Japan and Southeast Asia, Starlux has introduced strategic modifications to its aircraft leasing arrangements from Air Lease Corporation (ALC). Initially scheduled to acquire eight A330-900 aircraft in the year 2020, the company has chosen to amend this arrangement in response to unanticipated delivery delays. As a result, the revised agreement, effective as of May 22, 2024, involves the acquisition of five A330-900 aircraft alongside a supplementary allocation of six A321neo aircraft.

== Cabins and services ==
=== In-flight entertainment ===
In-flight entertainment (IFE) is provided through seatback touchscreen systems using the Safran RAVE Ultra Plus system, which are equipped with a USB power port and contain a selection of audio and video on demand (AVOD), as well as a live position mapping system. Starlux commissioned smooth jazz guitarist Peter White to provide a soundtrack for the entertainment system, which was commercially released on 29 November 2019 as Music for Starlux Airlines.

The airline also offers in-flight internet access through satellite Wi-Fi provided by SITAONAIR on planes delivered before June 2024, and Viasat on planes delivered on or after July 2024. First class, Business class, and Premium Economy class passengers get unlimited free data, while Economy class passengers only get unlimited free texting. As of November 30, 2024, WiFi plans are restricted to the complimentary plans given determined by cabin class, and additional data is not allowed to be purchased due to the retrofitting of Viasat equipment on older aircraft.

=== First class ===
First class is offered only on Airbus A350-900 and A350-1000 aircraft, with cabins featuring four seats in a 1-2-1 configuration. The seats can be converted into a fully lie-flat setting and features a door along with a 60-inch (152 cm) high partition. The seats include a personal mini-bar along with a 32 in (81.3 cm) video screen and a personal wardrobe. The cabin notably features no bulkhead separation with the business class cabin behind. First Class passengers departing from Taoyuan Airport are chauffeured to and accommodated by the Huan Yu VIP Terminal.

=== Business class ===
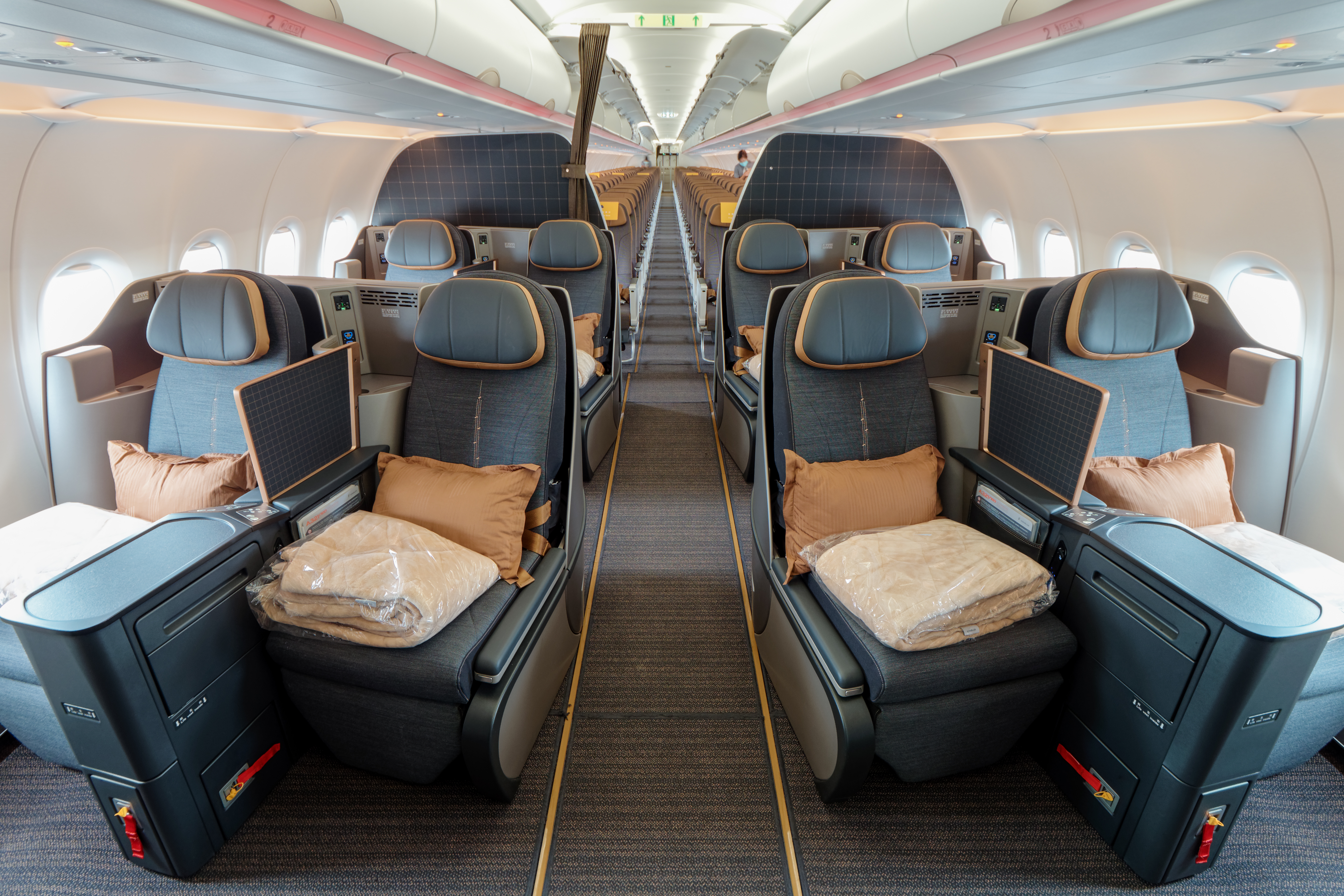
Starlux's Airbus A321neo business class cabin configuration

The Airbus A350-900 and A350-1000 business class cabins features 26 Collins Aerospace Elements seats in a 1-2-1 configuration that can be converted into a fully flat bed. Each seat features a 48.5 inch (123.2 cm) door and partition and are individually equipped with a 24-inch (61 cm) video screen.

On the Airbus A330-900, the business class cabin features 28 Safran Skylounge Core seats configured in a 1-2-1 seating layout. The seats can be converted into fully flat beds and are each equipped with a 17.3 in (44 cm) 4K IFE touchscreen.

The Airbus A321neo business class cabin has eight Collins Diamond seats in a 2-2 configuration. The seats are 20.19 inches (51.3 cm) wide and can be converted into an 82 in (210 cm) fully flat bed, featuring a 15.6 in (40 cm) IFE touchscreen.

Wi-Fi internet access, meals, refreshments, and amenities including noise-cancelling headphones and blankets are provided complimentary to all business class passengers.

=== Premium Economy class ===
Premium economy class is offered only on the Airbus A350-900 and A350-1000, featuring 36 Recaro PL3530 seats in a 2-4-2 configuration. The seats feature a 40-inch (101.6 cm) pitch and are individually equipped with calf rests and footrests, along with a 15.6-inch (39.6 cm) IFE touchscreen monitors.

=== Economy class ===
The Airbus A350-900, A350-1000, and the Airbus A330-900 all share a similar economy class cabin featuring Recaro CL3710 seats in a 3-3-3 and 2-4-2 configuration, respectively. The seats are each equipped with a 13.3-inch (33 cm) IFE touchscreen monitor.

On the A321neo, the economy class cabin has 180 seats in a 3-3 configuration featuring Collins Aerospace Meridian seats. The seats are 18.36 inches (46.6 cm) wide, each with a 10.1 in (26 cm) IFE touchscreen and fitted with a leather headrest. Meals and some amenities such as pillows and headsets are complimentary, whereas Wi-Fi internet access is provided to all economy class passengers free of charge (albeit restricted to in-flight messaging) with increased bandwidth and faster connection speeds available for an additional fee.

== Financial and operational statistics ==
Starlux's financial results are shown below:

	2018	2019	2020	2021	2022	2023	2024	2025
Operating revenue (NT$ billion)	—N/a	0.010	0.391	0.795	3.362	22.472	35.546	44.053
Net profit (NT$ billion)	−0.39	−1.14	−2.60	−3.01	−5.27	0.149	1.32	0.27
Total assets (NT$ billion)	5.69	12.26	18.15	24.39	57.08	79.07	119.06	137.29
Total liabilities (NT$ billion)	0.07	7.68	13.68	19.95	51.18	68.00	89.22	105.90
Total equity (NT$ billion)	5.61	4.58	4.47	4.43	5.90	11.06	29.83	31.39
Available seat kilometres (ASK) ('000)	—N/a	—N/a	—N/a	840,925	2,074,087	8,310,358	13,425,328	18,291,267
Revenue passenger kilometres (RPK) ('000)	—N/a	—N/a	—N/a	65,076	726,369	6,348,072	11,014,215	14,195,377
Passenger load factor (%)	—N/a	—N/a	—N/a	7.74	35.02	76.39	82.04	77.61
Number of passengers carried	—N/a	—N/a	34,784	41,419	329,790	2,666,544	4,103,635	4,902,048
Fleet size (at year end)	0	2	5	6	18	21	26	30
Number of employees (at year end)	—N/a	—N/a	—N/a	1,346	2,528	4,073	5,047	5,896

== See also ==
- List of airports in Taiwan
- List of airlines of Taiwan
- List of companies of Taiwan
- Transportation in Taiwan
- Air transport in Taiwan
