= Chang Kuo-wei =

Taiwanese businessman (born 1970)

- 張國煒
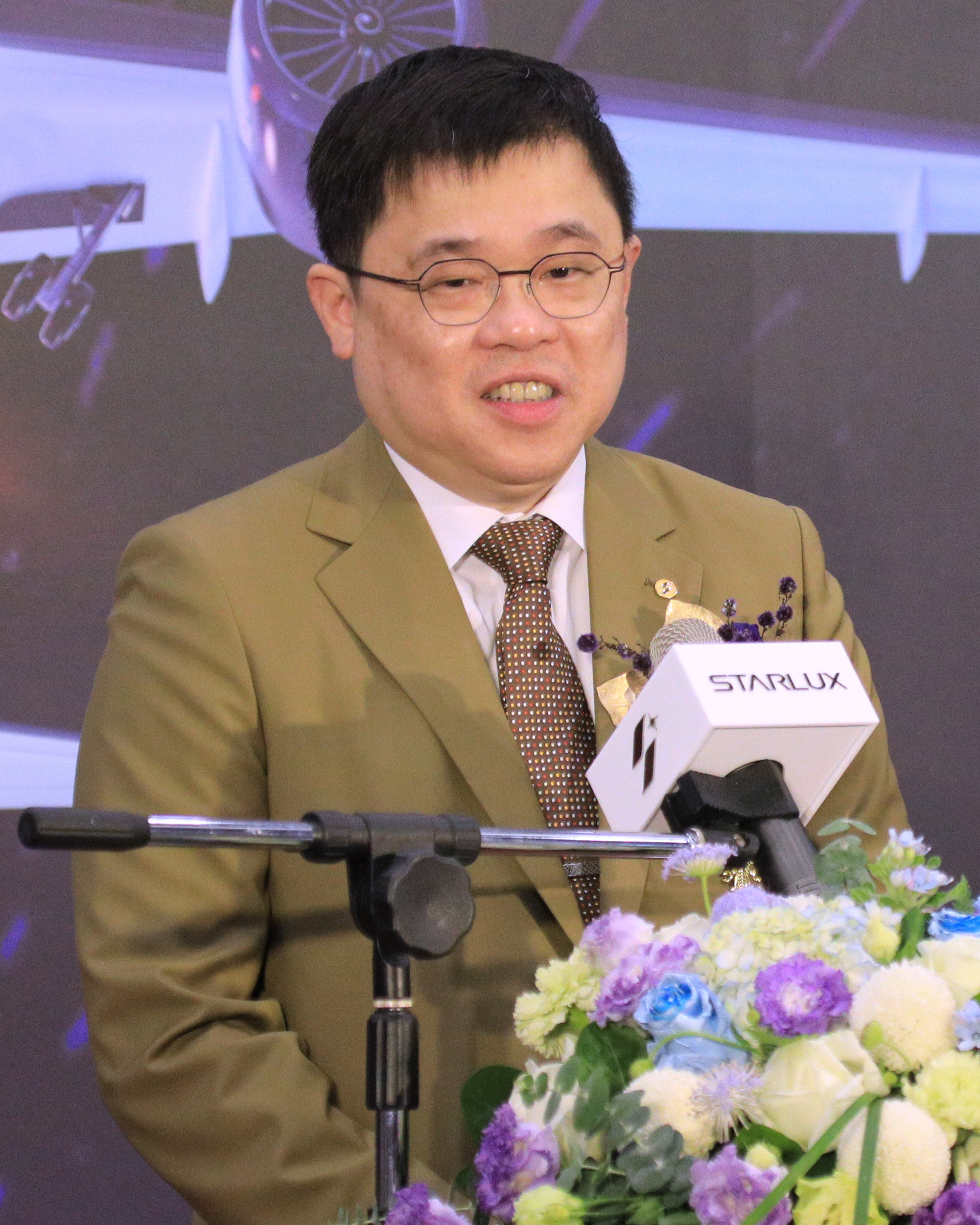
- Chang in 2024
- Born: September 6, 1970 (age 55); Taipei, Taiwan
- Education: University of Southern California (BS); California State University, Long Beach (MA)
- Organization: Starlux Airlines
- Known for: Founder of Starlux Airlines; Former Chairman of EVA Air
- Title: Chairman of Starlux Airlines
- Term: 2018–present
- Parent(s): Chang Yung-fa (father); Lee Yu-mei (mother)
- Awards: (France) Knight of the Legion of Honour (2021)

Chang Kuo-wei (pinyin: Zhāng Guówěi; born September 6, 1970), also known as K.W. Chang, is a Taiwanese billionaire businessman and aviator. He is the founder and chairman of Starlux Airlines and previously served as the chairman of EVA Air from 2013 to 2016.

Chang holds commercial pilot type ratings for the Boeing 777, Airbus A321, Airbus A330, and Airbus A350, as well as a professional aircraft maintenance licence. He is the youngest son of Chang Yung-fa, the founder of the Evergreen Group. Following a highly publicized succession dispute after his father's death, Chang was ousted from the family business, leading him to establish Starlux Airlines as a competitor to his former company.

== Early life and education ==
Chang was born in Taipei, Taiwan, on September 6, 1970, to Chang Yung-fa and Lee Yu-mei. He was educated in the U.S., where he graduated from the University of Southern California with a Bachelor of Science. He later earned a Master of Arts in economics from California State University, Long Beach.

== Career ==
=== EVA Air (1996–2016) ===
Chang originally joined EVA Air in 1996, beginning in ground-level maintenance operations before rising through various operational and management roles. He was appointed chairman in 2013. During his tenure, he was credited with modernizing the airline's brand image, including popularizing the Hello Kitty themed aircraft and expanding the airline's North American network. He also regularly flew unannounced as a line captain on Boeing 777-300ER services to Singapore and Los Angeles during this period.

=== Succession dispute and departure ===
Following the death of Chang Yung-fa in January 2016, a handwritten will was revealed naming Chang Kuo-wei as the sole successor to the Evergreen Group chairmanship and the primary heir to his father's personal fortune. However, his three older half-brothers used their majority voting power to dissolve the group chairmanship. In March 2016, while Chang was piloting an EVA Air flight to Singapore, the board removed him from his position as chairman. He was subsequently barred from returning to his role within the Evergreen Group.

=== Starlux Airlines (2018–present) ===
In 2018, Chang announced the formation of Starlux Airlines, a boutique luxury carrier. He personally piloted the delivery flights for the airline's first aircraft. Despite launching just before the COVID-19 pandemic, Chang maintained the company's growth by focusing on high-end regional travel and cargo operations.

By late 2024, Starlux successfully launched its IPO on the Taiwan Stock Exchange. Under his leadership, the airline expanded its routes to the United States — including a nonstop service to Phoenix Sky Harbor International Airport announced in 2025 — and applied to join the Oneworld airline alliance.

== Legal battles ==
In August 2024, the Taiwan Supreme Court issued a final ruling in a decade-long legal battle over the validity of his father's will. The court upheld the document, confirming Chang's right to inherit an estimated NT$14 billion (US$433 million) in assets. This ruling ended years of litigation brought by his half-brother, Chang Kuo-cheng.

== Awards and decorations ==
- (France) Knight of the Legion of Honour (2021) — Awarded by the French government for his contributions to the aviation industry and his partnership with Airbus.

== Aviation qualifications ==
Chang is widely described as the first airline chairman in Taiwan to hold both professional aircraft maintenance licences and commercial pilot type ratings simultaneously. He holds a US FAA aircraft maintenance certificate alongside his pilot credentials.

His pilot qualifications were accumulated over more than a decade. He began first officer training on the Boeing 777-300ER at EVA Air in 2010 and passed the Taiwan Civil Aeronautics Administration (CAA) captain examination in January 2013. His Airbus A321neo type rating was confirmed by a Taiwan CAA official in mid-2019, and his A350 XWB type rating was obtained at an Airbus facility in October 2022, with the examination conducted in Singapore.

Chang has personally piloted every delivery flight for new aircraft joining the Starlux fleet, including the airline's first Airbus A321neo (October 2019), its inaugural Airbus A350-900 (2022), and its first Airbus A350-1000 (January 2026), a 13-hour ferry flight from Toulouse to Taipei. He also piloted Starlux's inaugural commercial service, flight JX203 to Macau, in January 2020, and its first Los Angeles long-haul service in April 2023.
