= Recording Industry Association of Japan =

Japanese industry trade group

Recording Industry Association of Japan Nihon Rekōdo Kyōkai

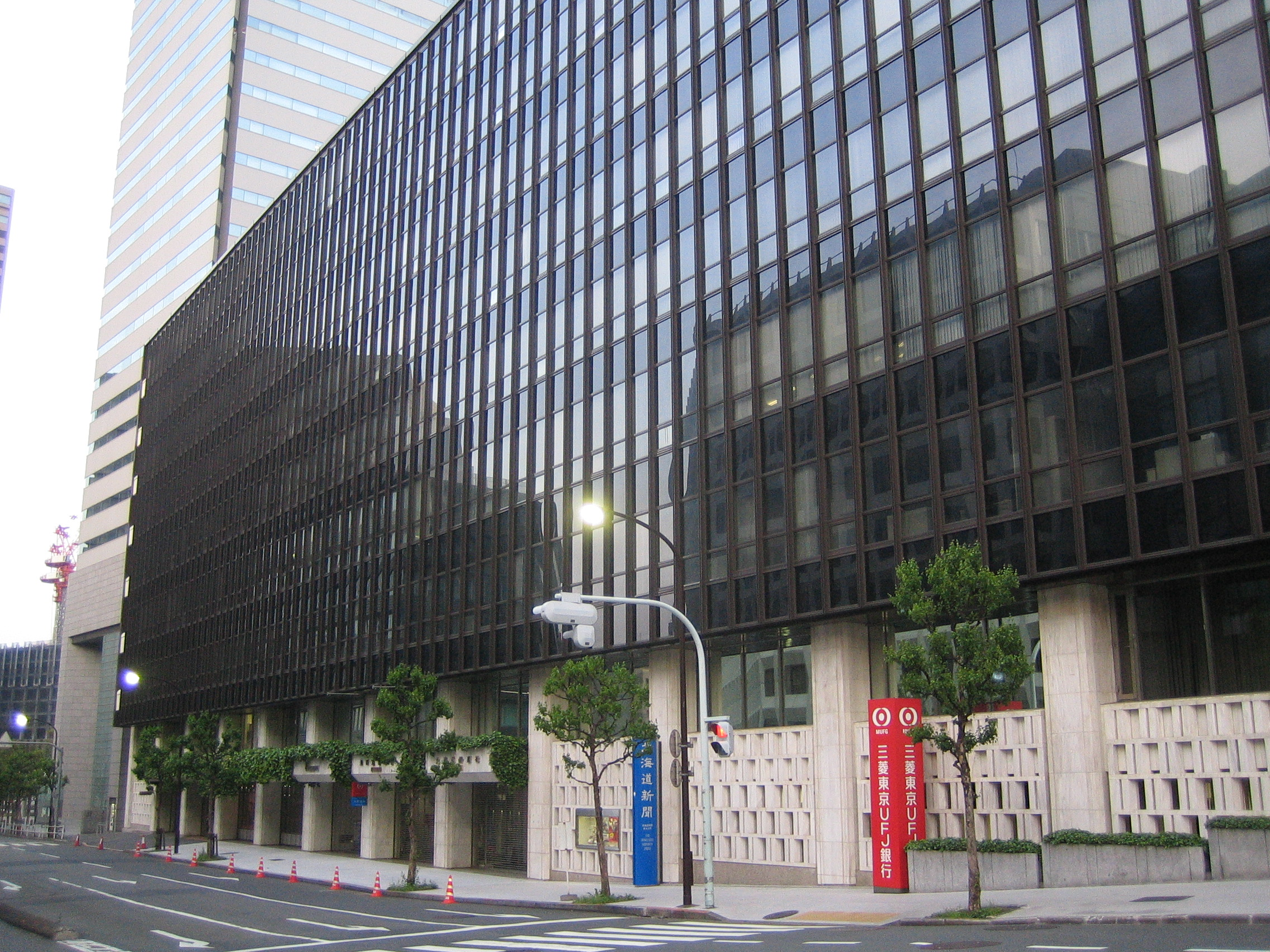
- The head office is located in the Kyodo Tsushin Kaikan building
- Formation: 1942
- Type: Technical standards, licensing and royalties
- Headquarters: Kita-Aoyama, Minato, Tokyo
- Location: Japan
- Members: 19 main members, 15 associated members and 24 supporting members (all as of August 2009)
- Key people: Hirohumi Shigemura (Chairman & CEO); Yoichiro Hata (Senior Managing Director & COO)
- Website: Recording Industry Association of Japan

The Recording Industry Association of Japan (RIAJ) (日本レコード協会, Nihon Rekōdo Kyōkai) is an industry trade group composed of Japanese corporations involved in the music industry. It was founded in 1942 as the Japan Phonogram Record Cultural Association, and adopted its current name in 1969.

The RIAJ's activities include promotion of music sales, enforcement of copyright law, and research related to the Japanese music industry. It publishes the annual RIAJ Year Book, a statistical summary of each year's music sales, as well as distributing a variety of other data.

Headquartered in Minato, Tokyo, the RIAJ has twenty member companies and a smaller number of associate and supporting members; some member companies are the Japanese branches of multinational corporations headquartered elsewhere.

The association is responsible for certifying gold and platinum albums and singles in Japan.

== RIAJ Certification ==
In 1989, the Recording Industry Association of Japan introduced the music recording certification systems. It is awarded based on shipment figures of compact disc or cassette tape which was reported by record labels. In principle, the criteria are limitedly applied to the materials released after January 21, 1989.

=== Certification awards ===
Currently, all music sales including singles, albums, digital download singles are on the same criteria. Unlike many countries, the highest certification is called "Million".

Thresholds per award
Gold	Platinum	2× Platinum	3× Platinum	Million	Multi-Million
100,000	250,000	500,000	750,000	1,000,000	2,000,000+

==== Old criteria (until June 2003) ====
Before the unification of criteria and introduction of music videos category in July 2003, a separate scale had been used for certification awards.

Format	Type	Thresholds per award					
Format	Type	Gold	Platinum	2× Platinum	Million	3× Platinum	4× Platinum
Albums	Domestic	200,000	400,000	800,000	1,000,000	1,200,000	1,600,000
Albums	International	100,000	200,000	400,000	1,000,000	600,000	800,000
Singles	Domestic	200,000	400,000	800,000	1,000,000	1,200,000	1,600,000
Singles	International	50,000	100,000	200,000	1,000,000	300,000	400,000

=== Digital certifications ===
Certifications for songs and albums released digitally began on September 20, 2006, using download data collected since the early 2000s. From 2006 until 2013, there were three categories for certifications: Chaku-uta (着うた（R）; "Ringtone"), Chaku-uta Full (着うたフル（R）; "Full-length Ringtone") (i.e. a download to a cellphone) and PC Haishin (PC配信; "PC Download") for songs purchased on services such as iTunes. On February 28, 2014, the Chaku-uta Full and PC categories were merged to create the Single Track (シングルトラック) category.

While digital album certifications are possible, only a few albums have received this certification since the RIAJ began awarding it, including the 2011 Songs for Japan charity album, and Hikaru Utada's sixth studio album Fantôme. In 2021, Ayumi Hamasaki's A Complete: All Singles (2008) became the first album released in the 2000s to receive digital certification.

Format	Thresholds per award				
Format	Gold	Platinum	2× Platinum	3× Platinum	Million
Chaku-uta (R)			500,000	750,000	1,000,000
Single Track	100,000	250,000	500,000	750,000	1,000,000
Album	100,000	250,000	500,000	750,000	1,000,000

=== Streaming only ===
As of April 2020, RIAJ has begun to certify songs for streaming, just as it does for physical shipments and digital download sales.

Unlike physical shipments and digital download sales, the streaming certifications have their own levels, due to the higher amount of streams compared to the other formats.

Thresholds per award
Platinum	2× Platinum	3× Platinum	Diamond	2× Diamond
100,000,000	200,000,000	300,000,000	500,000,000	1,000,000,000

== Members ==
=== Main members ===
- Avex Group^{1}
  - Avex Entertainment
  - Avex Digital (supporting member)
- Being Inc.
- Dreamusic Incorporated
- For Life Music
- Geneon Universal Entertainment^{1}
- King Records^{1}
  - Bellwood Records (supporting member)
  - King Records International (supporting member)
- Nippon Columbia
  - Columbia Marketing (supporting member)
- Nippon Crown^{1}
- Pony Canyon^{1}
  - Exit Tunes (associate member)
- Sony Music Entertainment Japan^{1}
  - Ariola Japan (supporting member)
  - DefStar Records (supporting member)
  - Epic Records Japan (supporting member)
  - Ki/oon Records (supporting member)
  - SME Records (supporting member)
  - Sony Music Artists (supporting member)
  - Sony Music Associated Records (supporting member)
  - Sony Music Direct (supporting member)
  - Sony Music Distribution (supporting member)
  - Sony Music Japan International (supporting member)
  - Sony Music Records (supporting member)
- Teichiku Entertainment^{1}
- Tokuma Japan Communications^{1}
- Universal Music Group^{1}
  - EMI Music Japan^{1}
- VAP Inc.^{1}
- Victor Entertainment^{1}
- Warner Music Group^{1}
- Yamaha Music Communications
- Yoshimoto R&C

=== Associate members ===
- Amuse Soft Entertainment
- Bandai Visual
- Croix
- Gambit
- HATS Unlimited
- Johnny and Associates
  - J Storm
  - Johnny's Entertainment
- KISS Entertainment
- Konami Digital Entertainment
  - Lantis (main member)
- LD&K Records
- Naxos Records
- NBCUniversal Entertainment Japan
- Pryaid Records^{1}
- Rambling Records
- Stardust Records
- Space Shower Networks
- Spiritual Beast
- Toy's Factory
- Venus Records
- Village Again Association

=== Supporting members ===
- Aceforce Entertainment
- Aniplex (subsidiary of Sony Music Entertainment Japan)
- Crown-Tokuma Music (joint venture of Nippon Crown and Tokuma Japan Communications)
- Free Board
- Holiday Japan
- Jei One
- Kino Music
- NPPDevelop
- T-Toc Records
- TV Asahi Music
- Ward Records

^{1}Member, International Federation of the Phonographic Industry.

== See also ==
- List of best-selling albums in Japan
- List of best-selling singles in Japan
- List of best-selling music artists in Japan
- Recording Industry Association of America
- Australian Recording Industry Association
- List of music recording sales certifications
- RIAJ Digital Track Chart
- Global music industry market share data
