= Songs for Japan =

Compilation album by various artists
- Released: March 25, 2011
- Labels: EMI, Sony, Universal, Warner

Songs for Japan is a charity compilation album created to benefit relief efforts for the 2011 Tōhoku earthquake and tsunami. A collaborative project between the music industry's "big four" record labels (EMI, Sony, Universal, and Warner), the album was released through the iTunes Store on March 25, 2011, through Universal. Royalties for the songs featured on the album were waived so that all proceeds could be donated to the Japanese Red Cross Society. A physical copy of the album was released on April 4, 2011, through Sony.

== Reception ==
Although Songs for Japan received praise for its charitable purpose it was criticized for being a compilation of already released songs, with the exception of Lady Gaga's remixed "Born This Way". This is unlike past charity albums such as Hope for Haiti Now that have included original music and performances.

== Commercial performance ==
The album sold 68,000 copies in its first sales week in the United States, debuting at number six on the Billboard 200. It sold 8,000 copies in Canada and debuted at number three on the Canadian Albums Chart. On the Recording Industry Association of New Zealand's compilations chart, the album debuted at number one. As of May 4, 2011, over 500,000 copies of the album have been sold, and over $5 million has been raised.

The album was certified as a gold record by the RIAJ in Japan for a shipment of 100,000 or more physical copies.

== Track listing ==
The CD features 37 tracks, while the iTunes version contains 38 tracks.

Disc one
| No. | Title | Artist(s) | Length |
|---|---|---|---|
| 1. | "Imagine" | John Lennon | 3:07 |
| 2. | "Walk On" | U2 | 4:29 |
| 3. | "Shelter from the Storm" | Bob Dylan | 5:01 |
| 4. | "Around the World (Live)" | Red Hot Chili Peppers | 3:58 |
| 5. | "Born This Way (Starsmith Remix)" | Lady Gaga | 6:45 |
| 6. | "Irreplaceable" | Beyoncé | 3:48 |
| 7. | "Talking to the Moon (Acoustic Piano Version)" | Bruno Mars | 3:37 |
| 8. | "Firework" | Katy Perry | 3:47 |
| 9. | "Only Girl (In the World)" | Rihanna | 3:55 |
| 10. | "Like I Love You" | Justin Timberlake | 4:43 |
| 11. | "Miles Away (Live)" | Madonna | 4:50 |
| 12. | "Love the Way You Lie" | Eminem featuring Rihanna | 4:23 |
| 13. | "Human Touch (Edit)" | Bruce Springsteen | 5:08 |
| 14. | "Awake (Live)" | Josh Groban | 5:39 |
| 15. | "Better Life" | Keith Urban | 4:43 |
| 16. | "One Tribe" | The Black Eyed Peas | 4:40 |
| 17. | "Sober" | P!nk | 4:11 |
| 18. | "It's OK" | Cee Lo Green | 3:46 |

Disc two
| No. | Title | Artist(s) | Length |
|---|---|---|---|
| 1. | "I Run to You" | Lady Antebellum | 4:16 |
| 2. | "What Do You Got?" | Bon Jovi | 3:47 |
| 3. | "My Hero" | Foo Fighters | 4:19 |
| 4. | "Man on the Moon (Live)" | R.E.M. | 6:01 |
| 5. | "Save Me" | Nicki Minaj | 3:05 |
| 6. | "By Your Side" | Sade | 4:34 |
| 7. | "Hold On (Alt. Mix)" | Michael Bublé | 4:07 |
| 8. | "Pray (Acoustic)" | Justin Bieber | 3:34 |
| 9. | "Make You Feel My Love" | Adele | 3:32 |
| 10. | "If I Could Be Where You Are" | Enya | 4:01 |
| 11. | "Don't Let the Sun Go Down on Me" | Elton John | 5:36 |
| 12. | "Waiting on the World to Change" | John Mayer | 3:21 |
| 13. | "Teo Torriatte (Let Us Cling Together)" | Queen | 5:55 |
| 14. | "Use Somebody" | Kings of Leon | 3:50 |
| 15. | "Fragile (Live)" | Sting featuring The Royal Philharmonic Concert Orchestra | 4:50 |
| 16. | "Better in Time" | Leona Lewis | 3:54 |
| 17. | "One in a Million" | Ne-Yo | 4:03 |
| 18. | "Whenever, Wherever" | Shakira | 3:16 |
| 19. | "Sunrise" | Norah Jones | 3:20 |

iTunes version
| No. | Title | Artist(s) | Length |
|---|---|---|---|
| 12. | "When Love Takes Over" (appears between tracks by Madonna and Eminem) | David Guetta featuring Kelly Rowland | 3:11 |

== Charts ==
=== Weekly charts ===
| Chart (2011) | Peak position |
|---|---|
| Canadian Albums (Billboard) | 3 |
| US Billboard 200 | 6 |

=== Year-end charts ===
| Chart (2011) | Position |
|---|---|
| Canadian Albums (Billboard) | 38 |
| US Billboard 200 | 86 |
