= Chang Yung-fa =

Taiwanese businessman

- 張榮發
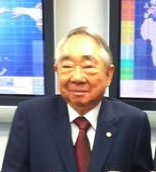
- Born: 6 October 1927; Su'ao, Taihoku, Taiwan, Empire of Japan
- Died: 20 January 2016 (aged 88); Taipei, Taiwan
- Other names: Tiuⁿ Êng-hoat (Hokkien); Hatsuo Nagashima (長島 発男, name under Japanese rule)
- Occupation: Business executive

Chang Yung-fa CBE (Chinese: 張榮發; pinyin: Zhāng Róngfā; Pe̍h-ōe-jī: Tiuⁿ Êng-hoat; 6 October 1927 – 20 January 2016) was a Taiwanese businessman. He founded and chaired the Evergreen Group.

== Biography ==
Chang was born in Su'ao, while Taiwan was under Japanese rule. When he was seven, the family moved to Keelung. After graduating from Taipei Commercial High School at the age of 18, he went to work in the Taiwan office of a Japanese shipping line. He continued his education by taking night classes at a vocational school in Taiwan.

After World War II, he joined the seagoing staff of a local shipping company as third officer. His subsequent career was spent with various local companies and he progressed through the ranks to captain.

In 1961, Chang and some friends jointly established a shipping company and, having helped this company to develop, he decided to branch out on his own, establishing Evergreen Marine Corporation on 1 September 1968 with just one secondhand 15,000-ton vessel, Central Trust.

Over the next four years, Chang built his fleet up to twelve, running them empty when necessary to convince his customers his services were regular and reliable. Within a year, he had expanded to the Middle East. Within three, Chang was dispatching Evergreen ships to the Caribbean.

In 1975, Chang realised that containerisation was the way forward. He built four advanced S-type container ships and launched his US East Coast service. Fifteen months later, he added the west coast of the United States to his network. Europe followed in 1979.

By 1984, he started his most ambitious service yet — two 80-day round-the-world services, one circling the globe in an easterly direction, the other westward. Departing every 10 days, the 20 G-type container ships he employed had a capacity of 2,728 containers each and could travel at a speed of 20.5 knots.

The Evergreen Group has expanded beyond the shipping industry to encompass operations in heavy industrial development, air transport, hotels and resorts services.

The Evergreen Group, with over 27,000 employees and more than 220 offices worldwide, now comprises about 30 major corporations worldwide, 3 of which are listed on the Taiwan Stock Exchange. During the 2012 Republic of China presidential election, Mr Chang expressed his disapproval of the so-called Taiwan Consensus. The China Post reported that he said that the "'Taiwan Consensus' smacks of Taiwan independence" which the paper said was "not his cup of tea". In February 2012, it was reported that Chang had pledged "to give away all his wealth" of approximately NT$50 billion ($US1.7bn, €1.5bn, £1.4bn as of 2020), primarily via the Chang Yung-fa Foundation.

Chang was married twice, first to Lin Chin-chih, with whom he had four children. He has a daughter, Chang Shu-hua (deceased), as well as three sons, Chang Kuo-hua, Chang Kuo-ming and Chang Kuo-cheng. His second wife Lee Yu-mei bore him one son – Chang Kuo-wei, the founder of Starlux Airlines. On 20 January 2016, Chang died at the age of 88.

== Conferment ==
- Honorary Doctor of Humane Letters from California State University, 1990.
- Honorary Doctor of Business Administration from the University of South Carolina, 1995.
- Honorary Doctor of Shipping & Transportation Management from the National Taiwan Ocean University, 1998.
- Honorary Doctor of Business Administration from Nottingham Trent University, 1999.
- Honorary Doctor of Business Administration from the National Chiao Tung University, 2000.
- Honorary Doctor of Transport and Academician from Russian Academy of Transport, 2007
- Honorary Professorship from the University of Houston–Downtown, 2008

== Honors and awards ==
- Order of Chivalry (D.M.P.N.), which carries the title of "Dato", State of Penang, Malaysia, 2000.
- Officer of the Legion of Honor, France, 2002.
- Recipient of Lifetime Achievement Award, Lloyd's List 2006.
- Commander of the Order of the British Empire (CBE), UK, 2006.
- Honorary Commander of the Order of Loyalty to the Crown of Malaysia (P.S.M.) (2006)
- Knight of the Grand Cross (Cavaliere di Gran Croce), Italy, 2007
- Commander of the Order of the Crown (Commandeur de l'Ordre de la Couronne), Belgium, 2008
- Commander in the Order of Orange-Nassau, The Netherlands, 2011
- Order of the Rising Sun, Gold and Silver Star from the Japanese government, 2012.
- Order of Merit of the Federal Republic of Germany, 2014.
