= Evergreen Group =

Taiwanese shipping and transportation conglomerate

- Native name: 長榮集團
- Type: Privately held company
- Industry: Transport; Hotel
- Founded: 1975; 51 years ago
- Founder: Chang Yung-fa
- Headquarters: Taipei, Taiwan
- Key people: Cheng Shen-chi (chairman)
- Products: Shipping; Cargo; Freight distribution Air transportation Hotel
- Subsidiaries: Evergreen Marine Corporation; EVA Air; UNI Air; Evergreen International; Evergreen Aviation Technologies; Evergreen Air Services; Evergreen Air Cargo Services
- Website: www.evergreen-group.com (in English)

The Evergreen Group (Chinese: 長榮集團; pinyin: Chángróng Jítuán) is the organizational designation used by a Taiwan-based conglomerate of shipping, transportation, and associated service companies. The Evergreen Group arose in 1975 from the diversification of the original Evergreen Marine Corporation, which was established in 1968 and currently operates as the world's third largest containerized-freight shipping company. Today, the Evergreen Group encompasses the Evergreen Marine Corporation, Evergreen International Corporation, EVA Air, Evergreen Aviation Technologies Corporation, Evergreen Air Services Corporation, Evergreen Air Cargo Services Corporation, and Evergreen International Storage and Services Corporation. Additional divisions and subsidiaries exist within several Evergreen Group companies, such as Uniglory Shipping Corporation and Uni Air.

== Evergreen Marine Corporation ==

Evergreen Marine is the seventh-largest containerized shipping company in the world, with a fleet of over 225 ships calling on 240 ports worldwide in about 80 countries. Evergreen Marine Corporation includes subsidiaries/divisions Uniglory Shipping Corporation, Hatsu Marine Ltd., and Italia Marittima S.p.A.

In 2021, the Ever Given container ship was stranded for nearly a week in the Suez Canal and caused a major obstruction that interrupted international maritime trade.

== Evergreen Steel Corporation ==
Evergreen Steel Corporation's main business activities include manufacturing and assembly of steel structures and maintenance and repair of shipping containers. In the past, it was also involved in shipbuilding, and built a number of ships.

=== History ===
The predecessor of Evergreen Steel Corporation, named Kaolun Industrial Corporation at the time, was founded in 1973, and renamed to Ever Master Industrial Corporation in 1982. Another predecessor, Ever Valor Industrial Corporation, started operations in 1984. The two companies merged (under the older company's name) year after, in 1985, and the merged entity was renamed Evergreen Heavy Industrial Corporation in 1987.

The company underwent further mergers (with Evergreen Superalloy Corporation in 1990, Ever Pioneer Steel Corporation in 1998, Green Steel Structure Corporation in 2009), acquired equities of its subsidiaries (of Super Max Engineering Corporation in 1997, of Hsin Yung Enterprise Corporation in 1998, of Mingyu Investment Corporation and Green Steel Structure Corporation in 2000, of Ever Ecove Corporation in 2018), and was further renamed numerous times (to Evergreen Development & Network Technology Corporation in 2000, to Evergreen Development Corporation in 2001, to Evergreen Steel Corporation in 2011).

It went public in 2019, and was listed on Emerging Stock Board of Taipei Exchange in 2020 and on TWSE in 2021.

== Evergreen International Corporation ==
Evergreen International Corporation includes Evergreen International Hotels, which operates the chain of Evergreen hotels and resorts worldwide, a Cultural Development Division, and the Evergreen Symphony Orchestra.

=== Evergreen International Hotels ===
The largest division of the Evergreen International Corporation is Evergreen International Hotels, which operate nine hotels in Taiwan, China, Thailand, Malaysia, and France.

The Evergreen International Hotels brand was involved in a political dispute during the Paris 2024 Olympics after an influencer posted a video showing one of the group's Paris hotels that displayed the flag of the Republic of China but not the flag of the People's Republic of China. Following the dispute the business issued an apology and said it does not support Taiwan independence and that it adheres to the 1992 Consensus.

== EVA Air ==
EVA Air is the international airline of Evergreen Group, operating regular flights to over 40 destinations worldwide. EVA Air features full passenger and dedicated cargo operations to North America, Asia, Europe, and Oceania. The parent company of EVA Air, EVA Airways Corporation, has links with the Evergreen Aviation Technologies Corporation, Evergreen Air Services Corporation, and Evergreen Air Cargo Services Corporation.

=== UNI Air ===
EVA Air's domestic and regional subsidiary is Uni Air, operating a network of intra-Taiwan routes and flights to several international destinations in the Southeast Asian region.

== Evergreen Aviation Technologies Corporation ==
In 1998, Evergreen Group's EVA Air partnered with General Electric to form the Evergreen Aviation Technologies Corporation (EGAT), a heavy maintenance and aircraft overhaul service. EGAT provides safety, repair, and refit services for EVA Air and other airlines' aircraft. In 2006, Boeing awarded EGAT an exclusive contract to convert four Boeing 747-400 aircraft into ultra-large Boeing 747 Large Cargo Freighter Dreamlifters for the new Boeing 787 Dreamliner program.

In 2020, EGAT announced that they would be segmenting into two distinct units with EGAT MRO to handle EGAT's maintenance, repair and operations business and EGAT FAB to handle EGAT's components fabrication business.

== Evergreen Air Services Corporation ==
Evergreen Air Services Corporation provides logistical and material support in the airline industry.

== Evergreen Air Cargo Services Corporation ==
Evergreen Air Cargo Services Corporation provides logistical and material support in the air cargo industry.

== History ==
Dr. Chang Yung-fa, Chairman of the Evergreen Group, was born in Taiwan in 1927. After graduating from Taipei Commercial High School at the age of 18, he went to work in the Taipei office of a Japanese shipping line.

After World War II, he joined the seagoing staff of a local shipping company as 3rd officer. His subsequent career was spent with various local companies and he progressed smoothly through the ranks to 2nd officer, chief officer and eventually to captain.

=== Foundation of Evergreen Marine Corporation ===
In 1961, Chang and others established a shipping company; he branched out on his own by establishing Evergreen Marine Corporation on September 1, 1968, with just one secondhand 15,000 dwt vessel, Central Trust.

Over the next four years, Chang built his fleet up to 12 vessels. Within a year, he had expanded to the Middle East. Within three, Chang was dispatching Evergreen ships to the Caribbean.

Back in 1975, Chang realized that containerisation was the way forward. He built four advanced S-type container ships and launched his US East Coast service, adding the US West Coast fifteen months later. Europe followed in 1979.

By 1984, he started his most ambitious service yet – two 80-day round-the-world services, one circling the globe in an easterly direction, the other westward. Departing every 10 days, the 20 G-type container ships he employed had a capacity of 2,728 containers each and could travel at a speed of 20.5 knots.

=== Expansion and formation of Evergreen Group ===
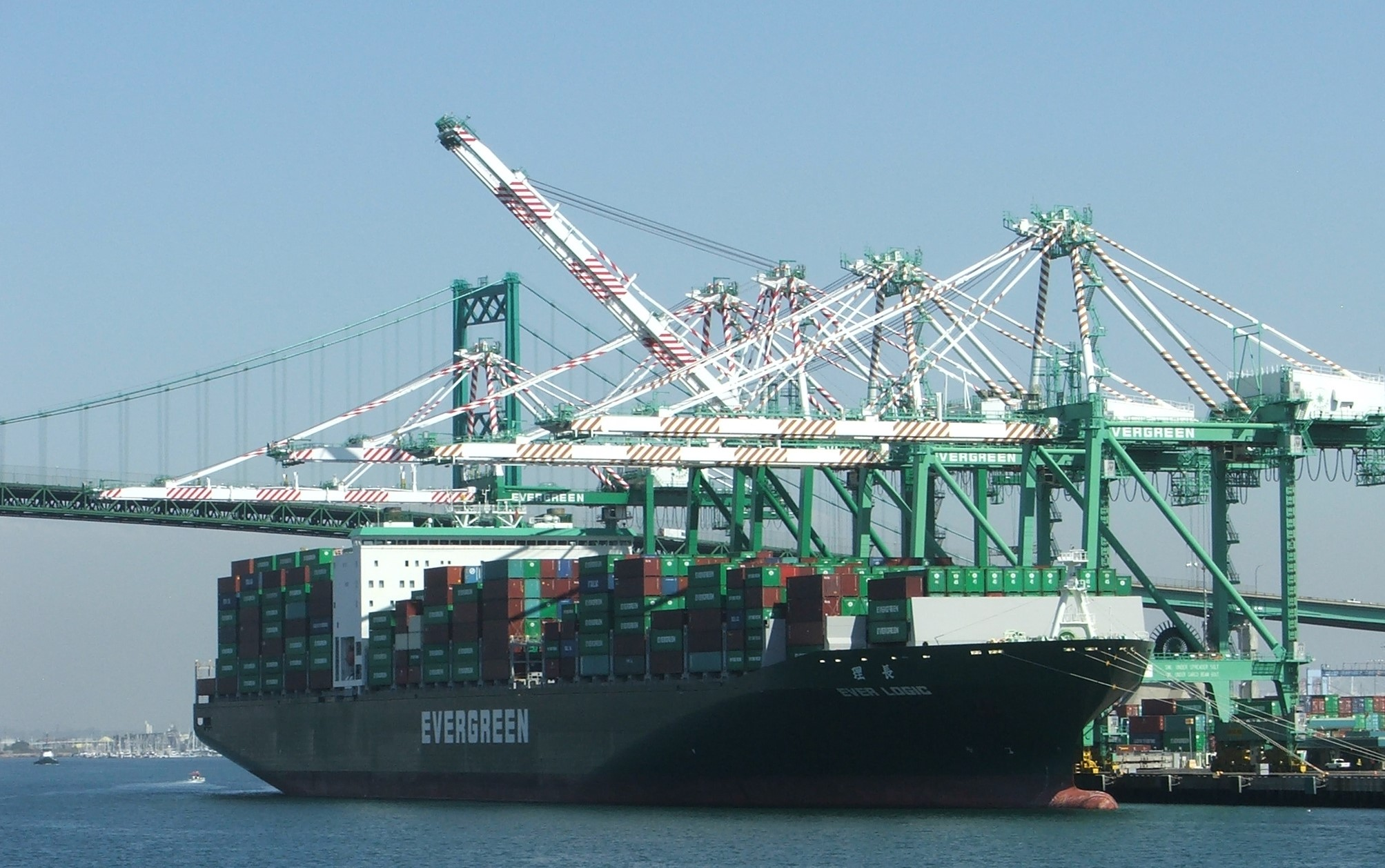
Evergreen cargo ship Ever Logic at Los Angeles.

The Evergreen Group has expanded beyond the shipping industry to encompass operations in energy development, air transport, hotels and resort services.

The country's first private international airline, EVA Airways Corporation, was established on March 8, 1989, and on July 1, 1991, formally inaugurated its first flight and began a new era of national commercial aviation.

In line with the development of its airline industry, Evergreen has become the first Taiwanese enterprise to gain a worldwide foothold in the hotel industry.

In 1998, Evergreen purchased the Italian shipping line Lloyd Triestino renaming as Italia Marittima S.p.A. on 1 March 2006, thus providing it with a firm foothold in the European Union. It consolidated this position in 2002 with the establishment of Hatsu Marine in London, a UK-flag shipping company that today operates some of the largest and most sophisticated vessels in the Evergreen Group fleet.

The Evergreen Group, with over 18,000 employees and more than 240 offices/agents worldwide, now comprises over 50 major corporations worldwide, three of which are listed on the Taipei Stock Exchange.

In 2006, the Kuomintang sold its former headquarters to Evergreen Group for $2.3 billion New Taiwan dollars (96 million United States dollars). In 2010, Evergreen Group announced that it would buy 10 ships each from Samsung Heavy Industries and CSBC Corporation as part of an ambitious plan to double its current fleet of 81 ships.

== See also ==
- Maritime industries of Taiwan
- List of largest container shipping companies
