= Le cygne =

Music piece by Camille Saint-Saëns, part of suite The Carnival of the Animals

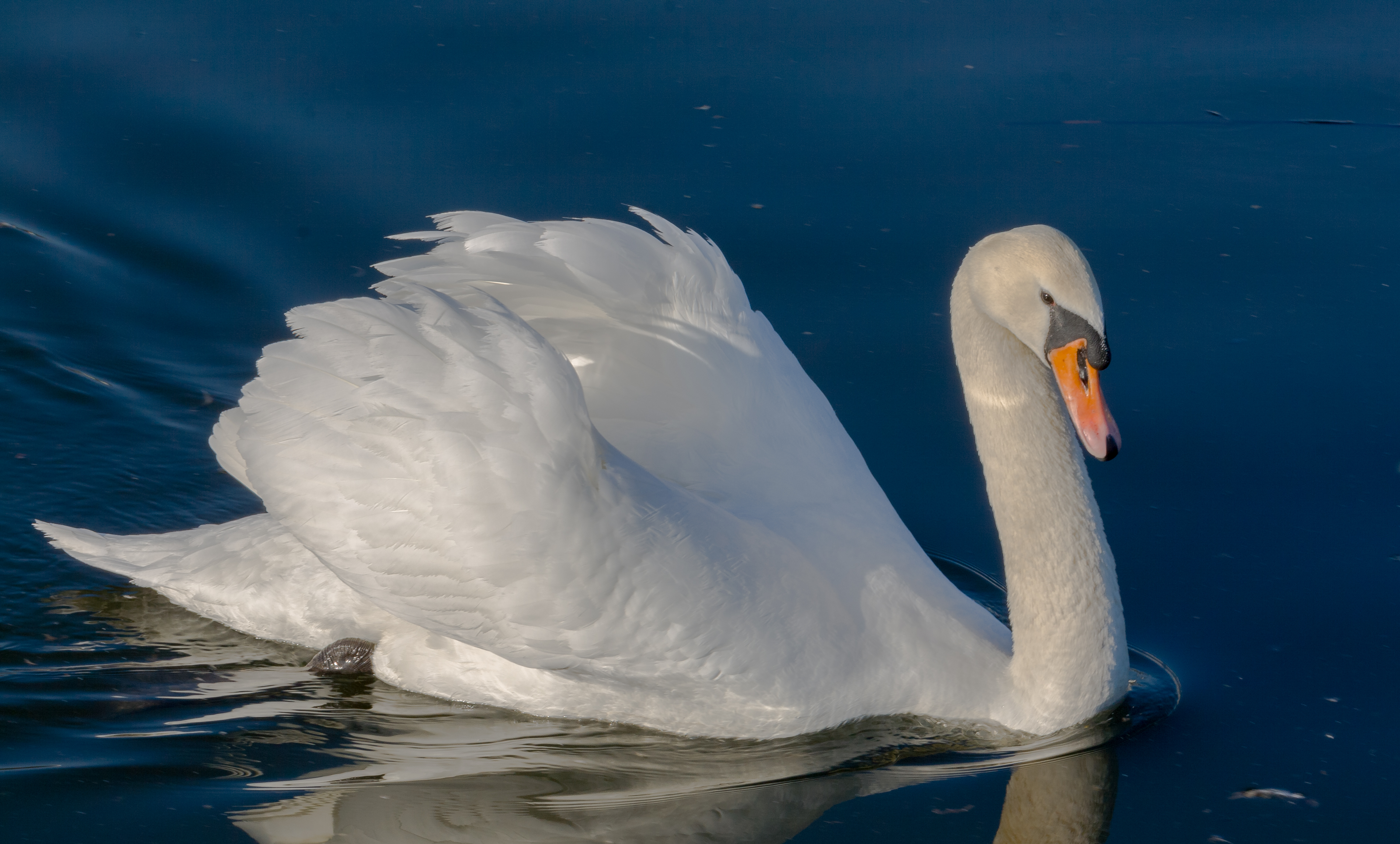
Swan, inspiration for Saint-Saëns' piece Le cygne

"Le cygne", pronounced [lə siɲ], or "The Swan", is the 13th and penultimate movement of The Carnival of the Animals by Camille Saint-Saëns. Originally scored for solo cello accompanied by two pianos, it has been arranged and transcribed for many instruments but remains best known as a cello solo.

== Music ==
"Le cygne" (The Swan)
Performed by John Michel, cello

"Le cygne" (The Swan)
Performed by Alisa Weilerstein (cello) and Jason Yoder (marimba)

The piece is in 6/4 (time signature), with a key signature of G major and a tempo marking andantino grazioso. The slow cello melody is accompanied by almost constant broken chord figurations on the pianos. When performed as a separate movement, not in the context of The Carnival, "The Swan" is frequently played with accompaniment on only one piano.

This is the only movement from The Carnival of the Animals that the composer allowed to be played in public during his lifetime. He thought the remaining movements were too frivolous and would damage his reputation as a serious composer.

"Le cygne" illustrates the fleeting nature of beauty with its interpretation of the legend of the "swan song": A popular belief among the ancient Greeks, who regarded the swan as among the most beautiful of animals, was that the mute swan is silent until its final moments of life, during which it sings the most beautiful of all birdsongs.

== Transcriptions and adaptations ==
In the 1890s, Louis van Waefelghem arranged Le cygne for Viola or Viola d'amore accompanied by piano. This adaptation was subsequently published by the French music publisher Durand (publisher) in 1895. Around the same time, pianist Leopold Godowsky created a well-known free transcription for solo piano, adding to the piece’s growing popularity. In the 1920s, Sergei Rachmaninoff recorded himself playing an arrangement of the piece for solo piano, by fellow Russian composer Alexander Siloti.

In a notable 20th-century interpretation, a young Gary Karr, at just 20 years old, performed the melody on double bass in Leonard Bernstein's recording of the work with the New York Philharmonic. The piece has also been interpreted vocally; soprano Montserrat Caballé recorded a version in which she vocalizes portions of the melody, supported by piano accompaniment.

The Thereminist Clara Rockmore brought the piece into the realm of Electronic music in the early 20th century, performing it on theremin with piano accompaniment by her sister, Nadia Reisenberg. Owing to its gentle tempo and smooth, Legato phrasing, Le cygne is well-suited to the expressive capabilities of the theremin. As a result, it has become a staple of the instrument’s repertoire, often performed alongside other lyrical works such as Sergei Rachmaninoff's Vocalise (Rachmaninoff) and Jules Massenet's Méditation from Thaïs.

In 1995, Euphonium soloist Steven Mead arranged Le cygne for euphonium and piano, transposing it to the key of E-flat major. The piece has also inspired popular and contemporary interpretations. Italian songwriter Tony Renis wrote lyrics for a version titled Notte Stellata (The Swan), featured on the debut album of the pop-opera trio Il Volo. In 2021, the Italian jazz group No Trio for Cats offered a reinterpretation under the title O Cisne de Janeiro, giving the piece a jazz-infused character. Additionally, an upbeat, accelerated version of Le cygne was produced for inclusion in the video game Gran Turismo 7, introducing the work to a new generation of listeners through digital media.

== Uses in choreography ==
"Le cygne" is often known as The Dying Swan, after a poem by Tennyson. Inspired by swans that she had seen in public parks, Anna Pavlova worked with choreographer Michel Fokine, who had read the poem, to create the famous 1905 solo ballet dance which is now closely associated with this music. According to tradition, the swan in Pavlova's dance is badly injured and dying. However, Maya Plisetskaya re-interpreted the swan simply as elderly and stubbornly resisting the effects of aging; much like herself (she performed The Swan at a gala on her 70th birthday). Eventually the piece came to be considered one of Pavlova's trademarks.

=== "Notte Stellata (The Swan)" by Yuzuru Hanyu ===
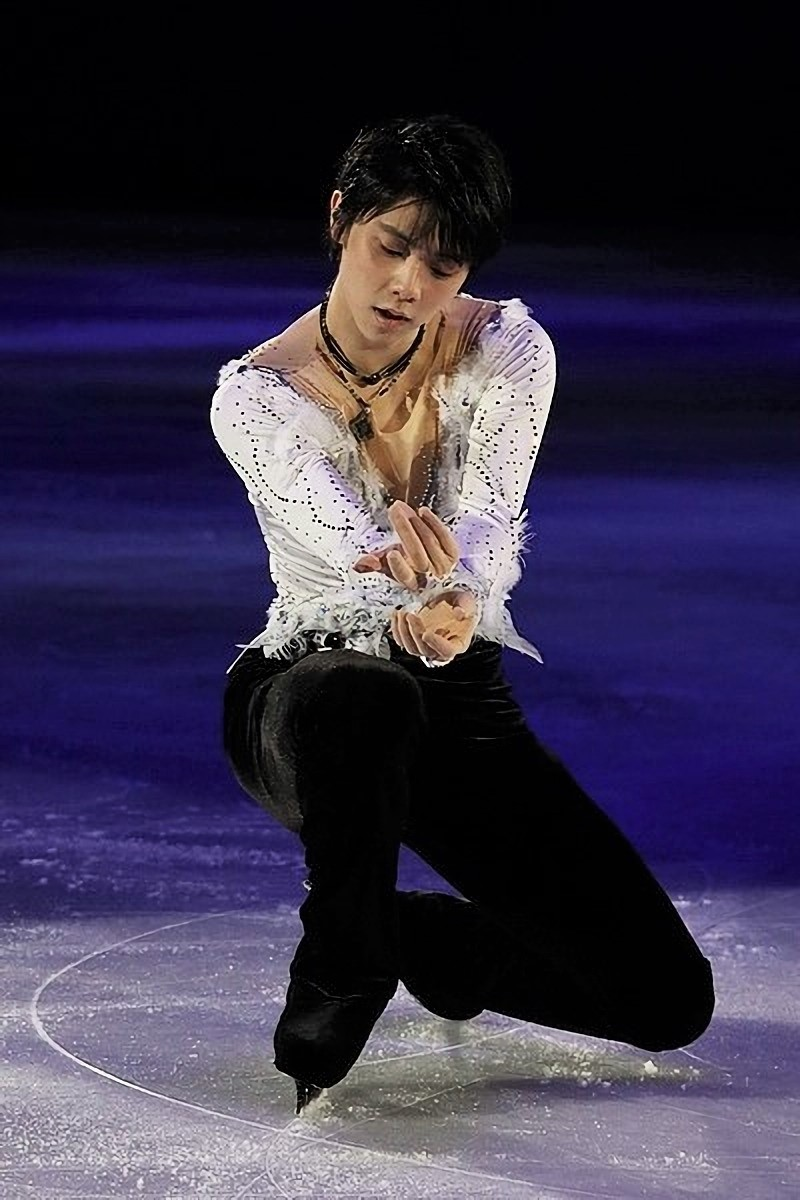
Hanyu performing to "Notte Stellata (The Swan)" at the 2018 Winter Olympics

Japanese figure skater and two-time Olympic champion, Yuzuru Hanyu, used Il Volo's adaption of Saint Saëns' "Le cygne", titled "Notte Stellata (The Swan)", as a program music at exhibition galas of various major skating competitions, including the 2017 World Championships, 2018 Winter Olympics, and the 2019–20 Grand Prix Final. The song was suggested to him by Russian coach Tatiana Tarasova and choreographed by David Wilson from Canada.

Hanyu performed the program as a tribute to the victims of the 2011 Tōhoku earthquake and tsunami. On March 11, 2011, he was practising at his home rink in Sendai, when the earthquake hit the north-east coast of Japan. The program is a reflection of his own memories, having experienced a blackout at the evacuation center on the night of the disaster. In 2018, Hanyu performed the program at the annual charity event 24-hour TV "Love Saves the Earth" on Nippon TV. His annual ice show with the title Yuzuru Hanyu Notte Stellata is a special commemoration event of the earthquake, held at Sekisui Heim Super Arena in Rifu on the weekend of March 11.

Hanyu's program served as inspiration for the ballet performance "Notte Stellata" by the American Crescendo Conservatory, led by Christina Valdez, at the Kauffmann Performing Arts Center in Kansas City, Missouri on June 16, 2019.

=== Other choreographies ===
In 1949 the American synchronized swimmer Beulah Gundling created a routine inspired by Fokine's choreography and entitled "The Swan" to "Le cygne" by Saint-Saëns.
