= Yuzuru Hanyu Notte Stellata =

Annual touring ice show in Japan

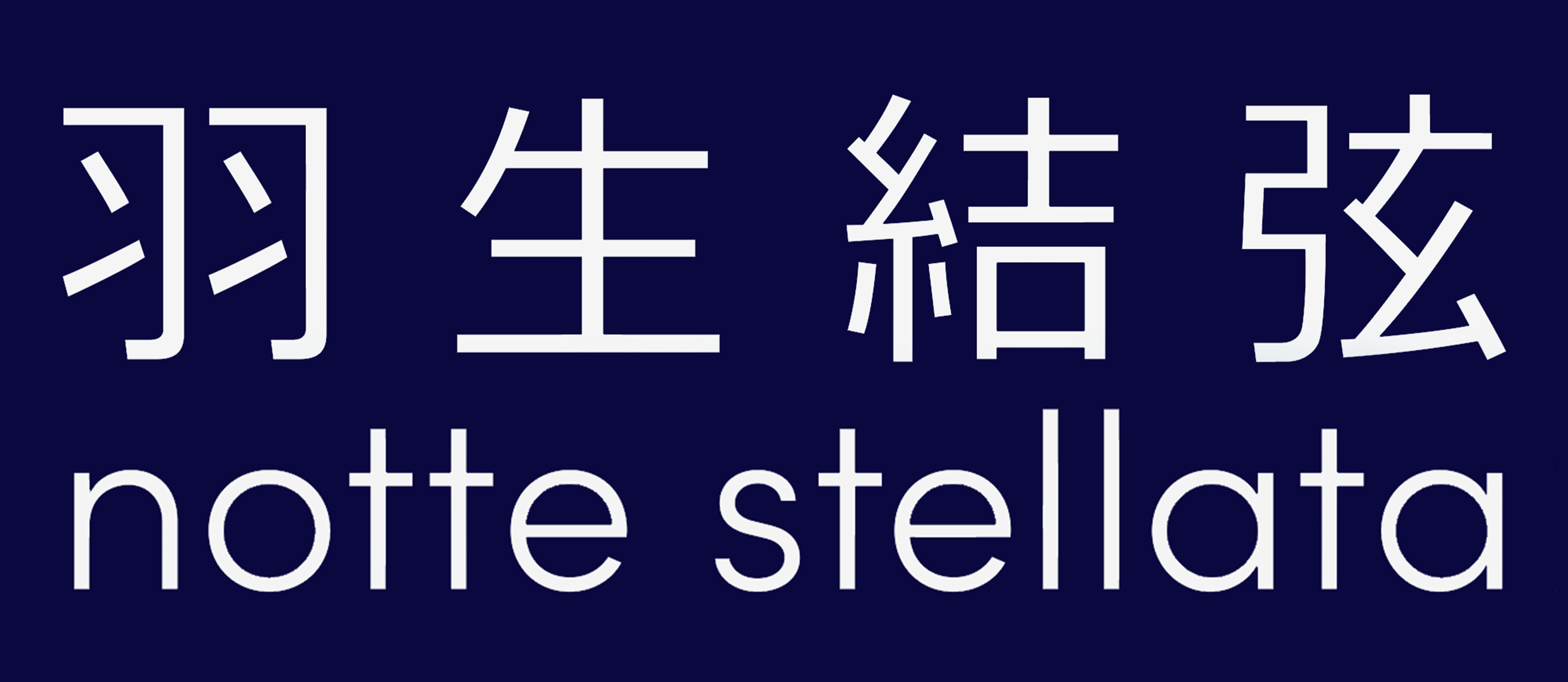

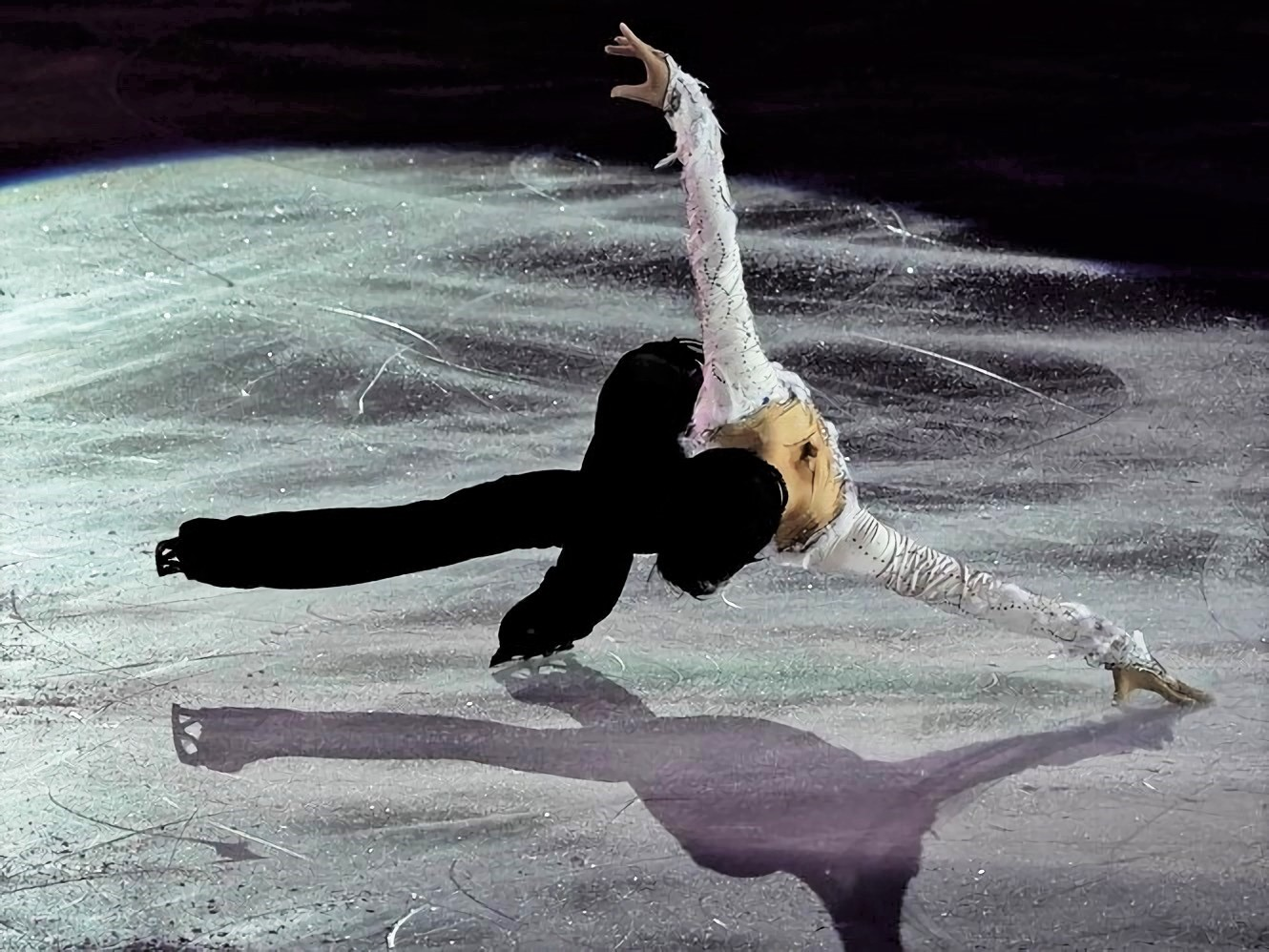
- Yuzuru Hanyu performing his exhibition program "Notte Stellata (The Swan)"
- Ice show type: Ensemble show
- Format: Figure skating exhibitions
- Theme: Commemoration of 3.11
- Cast size: 9–10 skaters, 1 guest artist
- Duration: 90 min
- Date: Weekend of March 11
- No. of shows: 4
- Frequency: Annual
- First held: 2023
- Status: Ongoing
- Country: Japan
- Venue: Sekisui Heim Super Arena
- Attendance: 19,500 (2026)
- Cinema live viewing: Japan; Hong Kong; Taiwan
- Streaming: Hulu Japan
- Broadcast: CS Nittele Plus
- Chairperson: Yuzuru Hanyu
- Producer: News Every (Nippon TV)
- Organizer: Nippon TV; Miyagi TV; CIC Co., Ltd. (advisor)
- Sponsor: Tōwa Pharmaceutical; JTB; Airdog Japan; Kosé (2023); PCA (2024); eplus (2025-2026)
- Website: nottestellata.com

Yuzuru Hanyu article series
- Skating career: Olympic seasons; Career achievements; Figure skating programs
- Other works: Bibliography
- Solo ice shows: Prologue; Gift; Repray Tour; Echoes of Life Tour; Realive; White Box Tour
- Ensemble ice shows: Fantasy on Ice; Continues with Wings; Yuzuru Hanyu Notte Stellata

Yuzuru Hanyu Notte Stellata (羽生結弦 notte stellata) is an annual ensemble ice show led by Japanese figure skater and two-time Olympic champion Yuzuru Hanyu, and organized by Nippon TV and its local station Miyagi TV. The show is a commemoration event of the 2011 Tōhoku earthquake and tsunami, also known as the "Great East Japan Earthquake" or "3.11", and is held on three days in March at Sekisui Heim Super Arena in Rifu, Miyagi, which served as a morgue at the time of the disaster. The show has a duration of 90 minutes and features a cast of international professional skaters as well as a special guest from another sport or performing art field, teaming up for new unique collaborations with figure skating.

Notte Stellata is named after Hanyu's exhibition program "Notte Stellata (The Swan)", which he has been skating as a tribute to the victims of the disaster on various occasions, including the 2018 Winter Olympics in Pyeongchang. Having experienced the earthquake and tsunami himself in his hometown of Sendai in Miyagi on March 11, 2011, Hanyu has since participated in multiple charity shows and made significant contributions to the reconstruction of the affected areas. The Notte Stellata show, inaugurated in 2023, is a production with the aim to further support the reconstruction and economic revitalization of the region as well as disaster prevention measures for the future.

The show is broadcast on the Japanese subscription channel CS Nittele Plus, screened live at cinemas in Japan and overseas, and distributed on the streaming service Hulu Japan. Recordings of the show's 2023, 2024 and 2025 editions were released on DVD and Blu-ray disc. The event is sponsored by Tōwa Pharmaceutical, the Japanese travel agency JTB, the Japanese ticketing platform eplus, and Airdog Japan, a company that specializes in air purifiers and humidifiers. In 2023, it was also supported by Kosé's skincare and cosmetics brand Sekkisei. In 2025 and 2026, Tōwa Pharmaceutical became the event's title sponsor. Notte Stellata is also supported by Miyagi prefecture sports association, and the local event and concert production company GIP.

== Background ==
=== 2011 Tōhoku earthquake and tsunami ===
The 2011 Tōhoku earthquake and tsunami, also known as the "Great East Japan Earthquake" or "3.11", was a M_{w} 9.0–9.1 submarine megathrust earthquake which occurred on March 11, 2011, in the Pacific Ocean east of the Tōhoku region. It was the most powerful earthquake recorded in Japan, triggering large tsunami waves of over 39 m run-up height, which affected a 2000 km of coast and caused widespread damage, including the Fukushima nuclear disaster. Among the most severely affected prefectures were Miyagi, Fukushima, Iwate, Ibaraki, and Chiba. As of December 2023, the disaster cost 19,702 people's lives in north-east Japan and, according to the World Bank, it is estimated to be the most expensive natural disaster in history with nearly US$300 billion being spent on rebuilding by 2023. More than 200,000 people were forced to live in temporary housings or permanently relocate as of 2015. In February 2024, 13 years after the earthquake, their number was still 29,328 according to an official report by the Reconstruction Agency. Despite the evacuation order being lifted, as of early 2023 only 1 % of Fukushima's population from the special reconstruction zones had returned to their homes. The disaster has caused serious damage to the local economy, including its traditional fish market.

Japanese figure skater and two-time Olympic champion Yuzuru Hanyu was 16 years old and practicing at his local ice rink, when the earthquake hit his hometown of Sendai, one of the most severely damaged cities by the disaster in 2011. He spent the following days at an evacuation center with his family, experiencing a blackout on the night of the disaster: "It turned pitch black just like that and the electricity was out. It was so dark in the city, but I remember thinking how bright the stars were then." Hanyu has since participated in multiple charity shows and made significant contributions to the reconstruction of the affected areas. At the annual ice show Yuzuru Hanyu Notte Stellata, for the first time in his career, he got the opportunity to perform in front of an audience on March 11 to commemorate the events and pay tribute to the victims the disaster: "I want this to be about everyone's remembrance of 3.11, like what they thought when they were looking up at the sky that evening. I want this to be an opportunity to bring people together."

=== "Notte Stellata" exhibition program ===
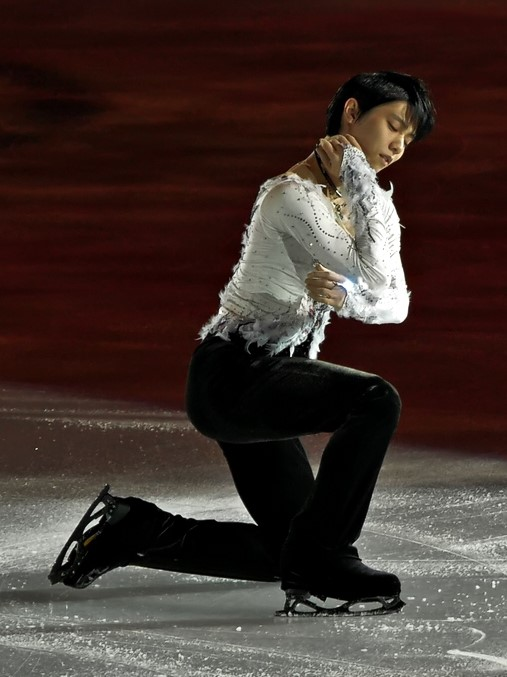
Hanyu performing "Notte Stellata (The Swan)" in 2019

The show's title "notte stellata" (lit. 'starry night' in Italian) is inspired by Hanyu's exhibition program "Notte Stellata (The Swan)", performed by the operatic pop trio Il Volo with lyrics by Tony Renis. The song is based on le cygne, the 13th and penultimate movement of The Carnival of the Animals by Camille Saint-Saëns. The music piece was suggested to Hanyu by Russian figure skating coach Tatiana Tarasova, and the program was choreographed by David Wilson from Canada.

"Notte Stellata" is a reflection of Hanyu's memories of the starry sky on the night of the disaster. It was debuted at the exhibition gala of the 2016 Skate Canada and performed by Hanyu at all major international figure skating events, including the 2017 World Championships, 2018 Winter Olympics, and the 2019–20 Grand Prix Final. He also presented the program at the 2018 edition of the annual charity event 24-hour TV "Love Saves the Earth" on Nippon TV, paying tribute to the victims of the earthquake, and skated it as the final act of his solo ice show Gift in 2023, the first skating event at Tokyo Dome, in front of a record audience of 35,000 spectators. At the 2018 Winter Olympics, Australian sports commentator and former competitive figure skater, Belinda Noonan, notably praised Hanyu's "Notte Stellata" performance, remarking:

With one delayed single Axel, one triple Axel, Yuzuru Hanyu, double gold medalist, just gave a masterclass of what figure skating actually is. What that gala exhibition showed is that he's been studying the history of the sport. There's little markers all through that gala performance. I think, that's one of the best gala performances I've ever witnessed.

== Global concept and structure of the show ==
Notte Stellata is the first ensemble ice show with Hanyu as chairperson since the launch of his professional career, featuring a cast of international professional skaters with Jason Brown, Shae-Lynn Bourne-Turok, Satoko Miyahara, Akiko Suzuki, Keiji Tanaka, Takahito Mura, Rika Hongo, and hula hoop skater Violetta Afanasieva. Since 2024, Javier Fernández joined the cast. The cast also includes guests from fields outside figure skating.

The event is held on three consecutive days, with each show lasting 90 to 120 minutes. The shows are opened by Hanyu with a performance to "Notte Stellata", followed by a group performance of the cast and individual programs by the invited skaters. The first half concludes with a collaboration between Hanyu and the guest performer. The show finale is a group skate to "Kibōno uta" (lit. 'Song of hope') by Misia.

The inaugural event held in 2023, included Japanese gymnast and three-time Olympic champion Kohei Uchimura, merging the sports of artistic gymnastics and figure skating for the first time. Canadian David Wilson created the choreography for the show. The first half was concluded with a collaboration between Hanyu on the ice and Kohei Uchimura on the floor to the music piece "Conquest of Paradise" by Vangelis. The second half of the show was opened with a group number by Hongo, Suzuki, Bourne-Turok, and Mura to the song "Dynamite" from the K-pop band BTS. During the program, a dance performance of Hanyu was shown on screen and on the ice surface using projection mapping technology. A total of 20 programs was performed, closing with Hanyu's exhibition program to "Haru yo, koi", in which he expressed his thoughts on the reconstruction.

The 4th consecutive installment of Notte Stellata was held on March 7, 8, and 9th, 2026 with guest performer the Tohoku Youth Orchestra. This performance marked 15 years since the Great East Japan Earthquake and Tsunami.

=== Collaborations with special guests ===
==== Kohei Uchimura (2023) ====
The two athletes were taking turns in performing, Hanyu presenting multiple jumps and a cartwheel, and Uchimura showing four consecutive whips with a layout somersault among other elements. They finished the program with a synchronized sit spin and double leg circle rotation as well as a side-by-side quad toe loop and double twisting back layout. For Uchimura's pommel horse exercises, a mushroom trainer was installed in front of the floor apparatus.

==== Mao Daichi (2024) ====
Mao Daichi, Japanese actress and former top star of the famed all-female troupe Takarazuka Revue, collaborated with Hanyu for the performance of Carmina Burana. The collaboration was like a stage performance on ice. On the stage, Daichi played the Goddess of Destiny and Hanyu, on the ice, portrayed an innocent boy who moves freely exploring the world until the Goddess of Destiny takes control of him. Hanyu explained, "[...] as the boy grows up, the Goddess of Destiny appears to him and he becomes trapped in his destiny. [...] In the end, he accepts his fate and submits to his destiny, but moves forward driven by his own will."

==== Mansai Nomura (2025) ====
Yuzuru Hanyu and top noh theatre artist Mansai Nomura collaborated for the first time in an unprecedented performance that combined figure skating and kyōgen. Hanyu, Nomura and the ensemble skaters performed "MANSAI Bolero," originally created by Nomura as a dedication to "requiem and rebirth" following the 2011 Tōhoku earthquake and tsunami. Nomura's performance on a noh stage set in the middle of the ice rink seamlessly intertwined with Hanyu's skating, beautifully enhanced by an elegant traditional Japanese attire with long sleeves. Hanyu performed a graceful dance to the melody of Maurice Ravel's Boléro and to the foot-stomping rhythm of Mansai.

At the start of the second part of the event, Hanyu and Nomura performed SEIMEI, Hanyu's signature program with which he won his second olympic gold medal. Nomura appeared on an elevated stage dressed as Abe no Seimei, the character from the film Onmyoji, in which he starred. In a film-like scene, Nomura incanted, "Heaven. Earth. Man." and "Appear, Yuzuru Hanyu. Swiftly by law." At that moment, Hanyu emerged as shikigami. Mansai dashed along the rinkside stopping to dance and chant incantations that connected with Hanyu performance on the ice. Following the Olympic composition of the program, Hanyu executed a perfect quadruple Salchow and a flawless combination jump following a quadruple toe loop, and showed off a highly polished performance.

==== Tohoku Youth Orchestra (2026) ====
The Tohoku Youth Orchestra was established in March 2014 as a successor to the “Children’s Music Revival Fund,” initiated by the late Ryuichi Sakamoto in July 2011 to inspect and repair musical instruments in schools damaged by the Great East Japan Earthquake. It is a mixed orchestra of about 90 members, consisting of elementary school students through university students from Iwate, Miyagi, and Fukushima. For this event, 50 members participated. Their mission statements include "Music can bring out the will to live" and "From being supported to supporting others."

==== Il Volo (2027) ====
Il Volo is an internationally renowned Italian vocal trio comprising three singers. "Notte Stellata," one of the group's signature songs, is the title of Hanyu's exhibition program and also serves as the title of the ice show. Hanyu commented:

"I have been skating to recordings of Il Volo's singing for a long time, so I'm really excited to find out what it will be like to hear the full power of their voices in person. I'm particularly looking forward to experiencing how the sheer vocal power of singers with such refined classical vocal techniques will resonate throughout the venue. I believe it's something that can only truly be appreciated when hearing them perform live."

== Attendance and accessibility ==
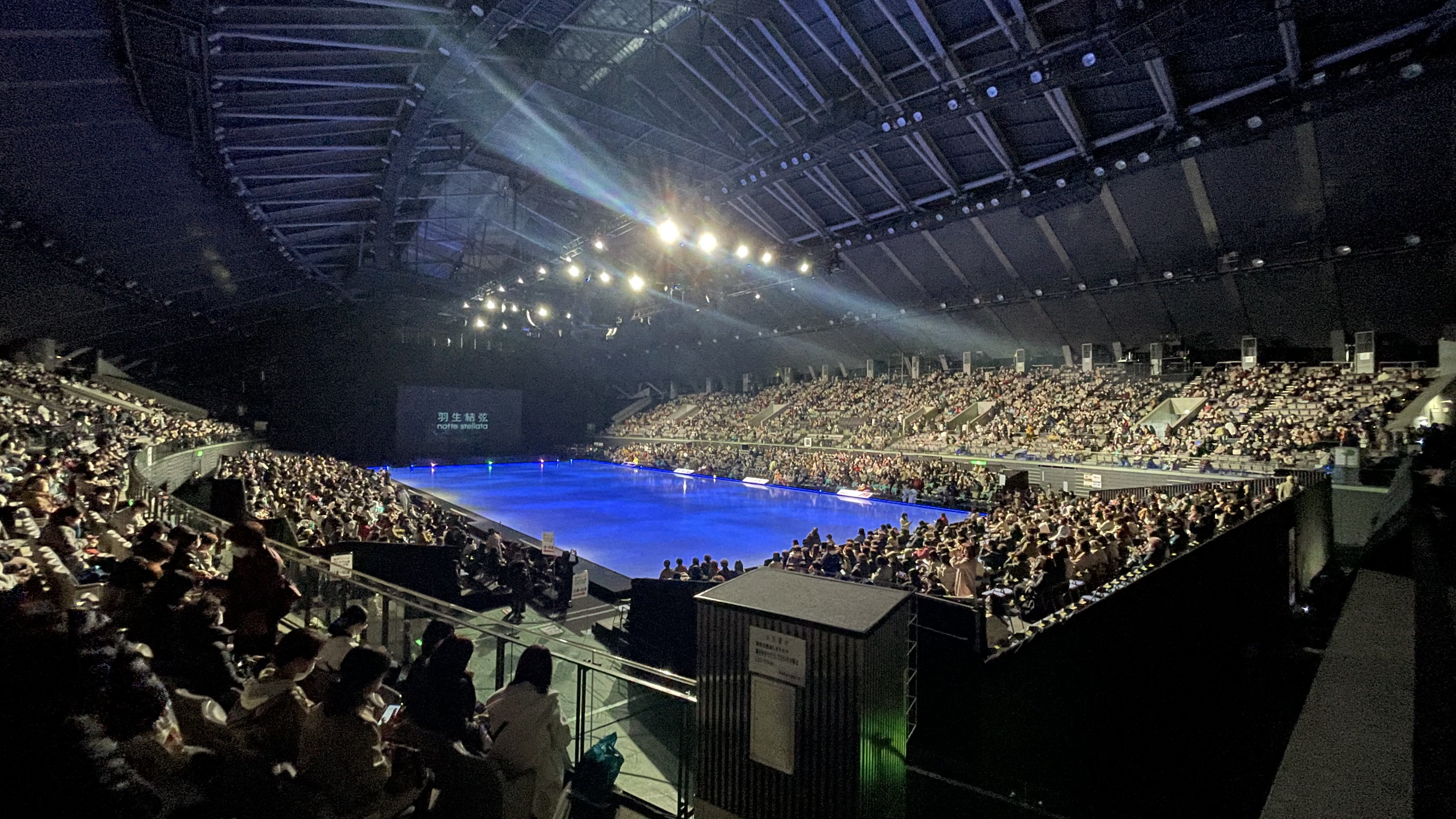
Side view of the rink on the first day of Yuzuru Hanyu Notte Stellata at Sekisui Heim Super Arena

The Sekisui Heim Super Arena is located in Rifu near Hanyu's hometown of Sendai and served as a morgue at the time of the disaster in 2011. The venue was sold out with an attendance of 6,000 spectators per day in 2023 and 6,100 in 2024. and tickets were again distributed by lottery sale with prices ranging from 15,000 to 29,000 yen ($111–214 as of 2023). All three days of the 2023 show were screened live at movie theaters in Japan as well as overseas in Hong Kong and Taiwan. In addition, they were aired live nationally on the subscription streaming platform Hulu Japan, and were broadcast on CS Nittele Plus on March 31, 2023. An extended version with behind-the-scenes footage was broadcast on April 23 on the same channel.

The 2023 event was sponsored by Kose's skincare and cosmetics brand Sekkisei, Towa Pharmaceutical, and the Japanese travel agency JTB. The 2025 event, sponsored by Towa Pharmaceutical, JTB, and the Japanese ticketing service eplus, saw total attendance rise to 6,256 spectators. For the 2026 event, alongside sponsors Towa Pharmaceutical, JTB, and eplus, Air Dog Japan joined as a new sponsor. Tickets were sold out for all three days, with 6,500 attendees each.

DVD and Blu-Ray disc for the 2023 show were released on February 9, 2024., and a DVD and Blu-Ray disc for the 2024 show were released on March 31, 2025., and a DVD and Blu-Ray disc for the 2025 show were released on March 1, 2026.

- Attendance numbers do not include cinema live viewing events.
- Broadcast dates refer to the premiere on the subscription channel Hulu Japan.

Chronological list of show dates, attendance, and broadcasting
Date	Attendance	Cinema	Broadcast premiere	Ref.
Mar 10, 2023	6,000	Live	Live	
Mar 11, 2023	6,000	Live	Live	
Mar 12, 2023	6,000	Live (Japan, Hong Kong, Taiwan)	Live	
Mar 8, 2024	6,100	Live (Japan); Delayed: Apr 12, 2024 (Fujian, China)	Live	
Mar 9, 2024	6,100	Live	Live	
Mar 10, 2024	6,100	Live (Japan, Hong Kong, Taiwan)	Live	
Mar 7, 2025	6,256	Live	Live	
Mar 8, 2025	6,256	Live	Live	
Mar 9, 2025	6,256	Live	Live	
Mar 7, 2026	6,500	Live	Live	
Mar 8, 2026	6,500	Live	Live	
Mar 9, 2026	6,500	Live; Delayed: Mar 11, 2026	Live	
Total	74,568			

== Cast ==
Skaters at Yuzuru Hanyu Notte Stellata
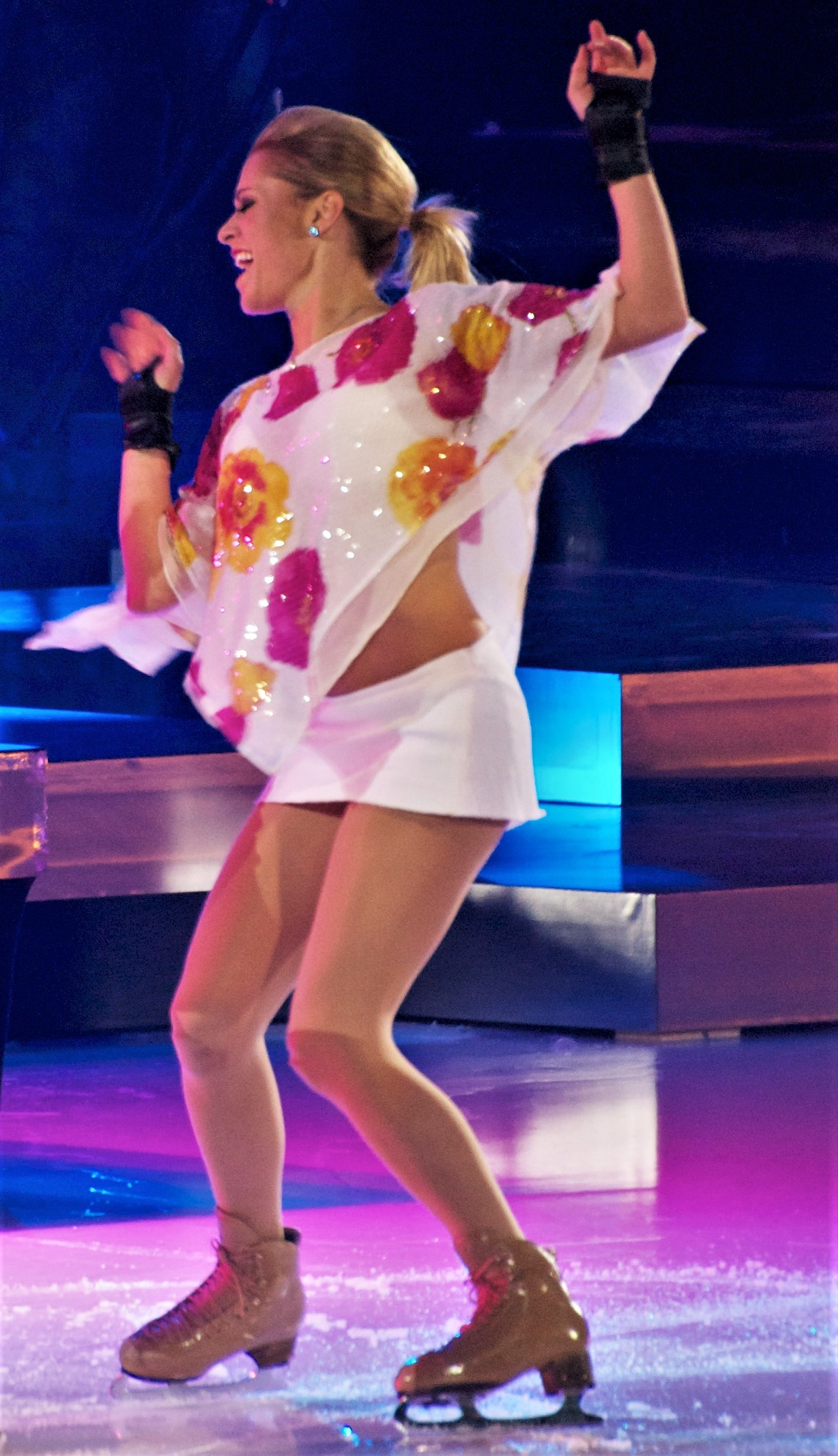
Shae-Lynn Bourne

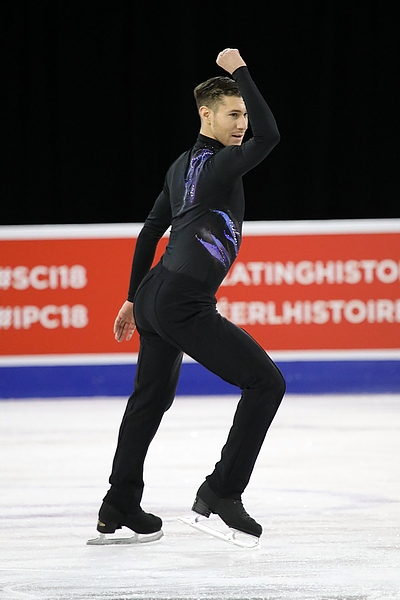
Jason Brown

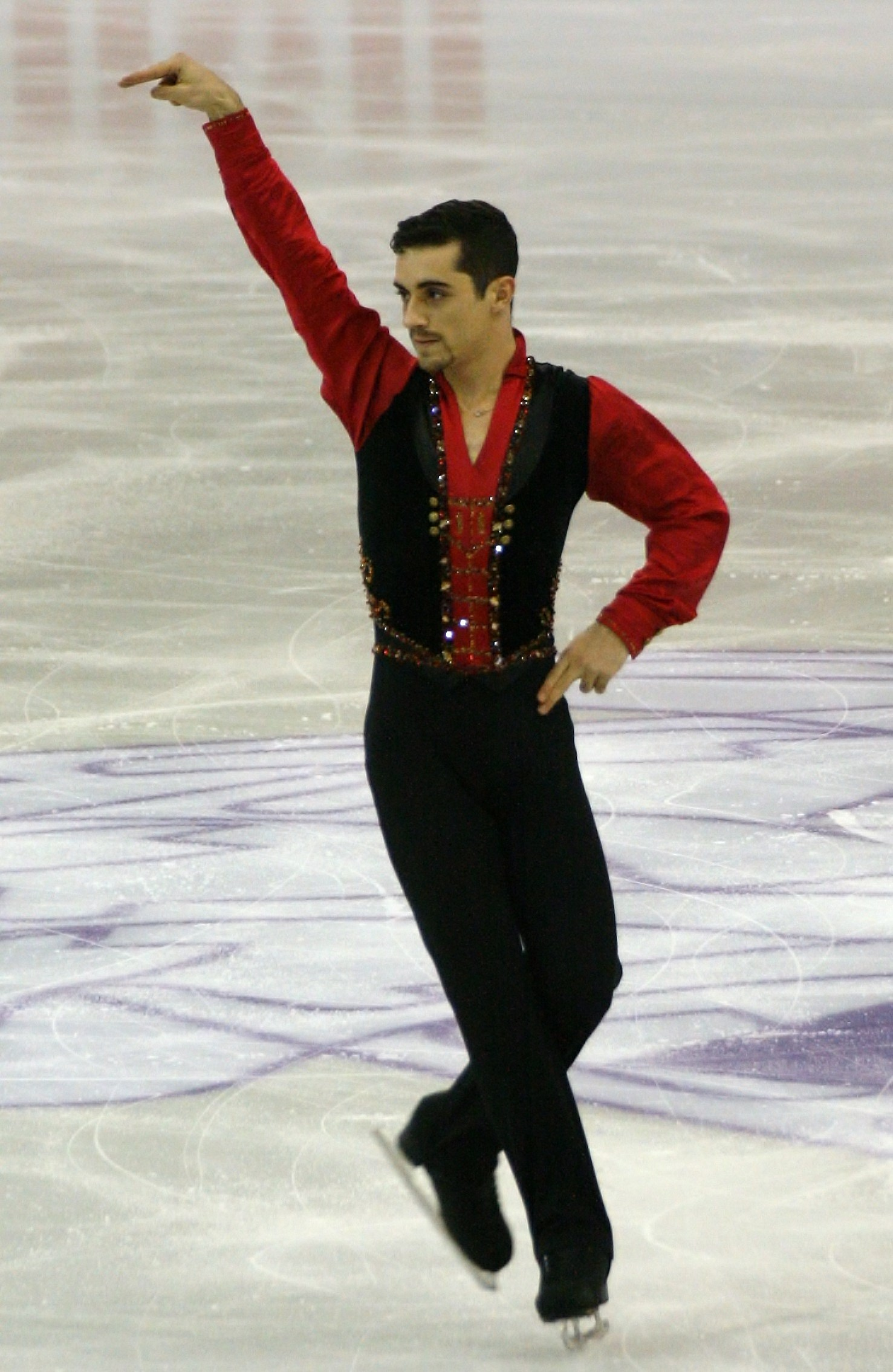
Javier Fernández

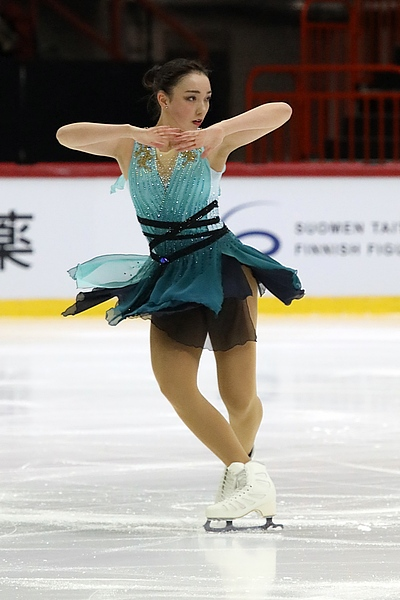
Rika Hongo

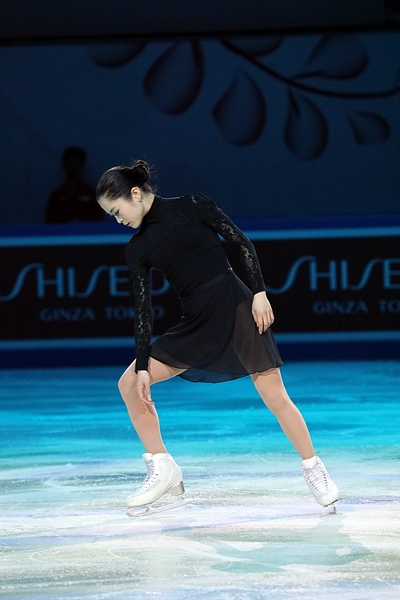
Satoko Miyahara

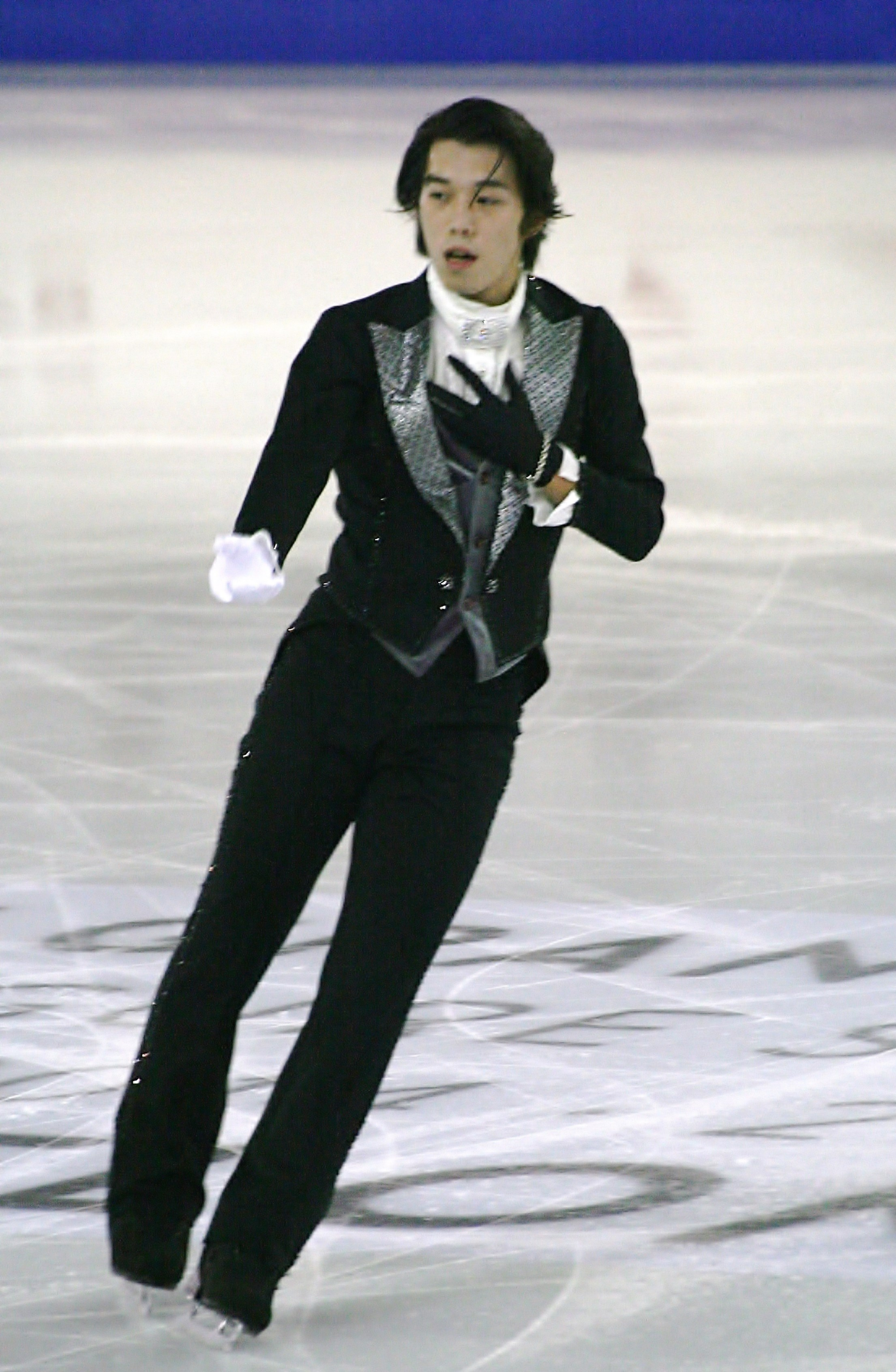
Takahito Mura

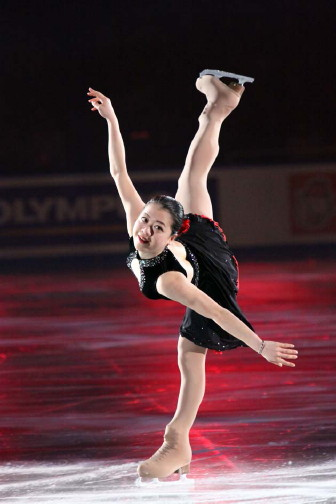
Akiko Suzuki

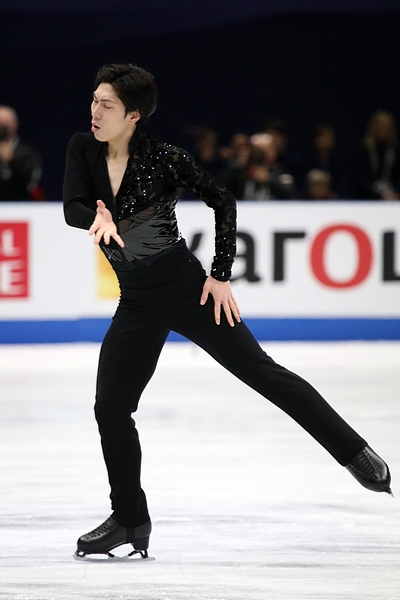
Keiji Tanaka

Figure skaters

- Yuzuru Hanyu (chairperson)
- Violetta Afanasieva (hula hoop dancer)
- Shae-Lynn Bourne-Turok
- Jason Brown
- Javier Fernández (since 2024)
- Rika Hongo
- Satoko Miyahara
- Takahito Mura
- Akiko Suzuki
- Keiji Tanaka

Guest artists

- 2023: Kohei Uchimura (artistic gymnast)
- 2024: Mao Daichi (Actor)
- 2025: Mansai Nomura (Kyōgen performer)
- 2026: Tohoku Youth Orchestra
- 2027: Il Volo (Singer)

== Set lists ==
=== 2023 ===
First half

1. Yuzuru Hanyu – "Notte Stellata (The Swan)"
  (by Il Volo)
2. Group opening – "Twinkling Stars of Hope"
  (by Karl Hugo)
3. Rika Hongo – "The Prayer"
  (by Celine Dion and Andrea Bocelli, cover version by Pentatonix)
4. Takahito Mura – "San San"
  (by Daichi Miura)
5. Shae-Lynn Bourne-Turok – "Firedance"
  (by Bill Whelan; performed live with Bohdan Turok)
6. Keiji Tanaka – "Memories (The Prophet)"
  (by Gary Moore)
7. Violetta Afanasieva – "The Lost Voices"
  (by Lil Fish and Clozee)
8. Jason Brown – "Melancholy"
  (by Alexey Kosenko)
9. Satoko Miyahara – Gnossienne No. 1
  (by Erik Satie)
10. Hanyu / Uchimura – "Conquest of Paradise"
  (by Vangelis)

Second half

11. Bourne-Turok / Hongo / Mura / Suzuki – "Dynamite"
  (by BTS; Hanyu's dance performance shown on screen)
12. Keiji Tanaka – Somewhere in Time
  (by John Barry)
13. Violetta Afanasieva – "Hope"
  (by DubVision)
14. Jason Brown – "The Impossible Dream"
  (by Mitch Leigh, cover version by Josh Groban)
15. Satoko Miyahara – "Stabat Mater"
  (by June Anderson and Cecilia Bartoli)
16. Akiko Suzuki – Claire de lune
  (by Claude Debussy)
17. Hongo / Mura – "Singin' in the Rain"
18. Kohei Uchimura – Floor exercise
19. Yuzuru Hanyu – "Haru yo, koi"
  (by Yumi Matsutoya, piano version by Shinya Kiyozuka)
20. Group finale – "Kibō no uta (Song of Hope)"
  (by Misia)
21. Show finale – "Michi"
  (by Greeeen)

=== 2024 ===
First half

1. Yuzuru Hanyu – "Notte Stellata (The Swan)"
  (by Il Volo)
2. Group opening – "Twinkling Stars of Hope"
  (by Karl Hugo)
3. Rika Hongo – "True Colours"
  (by Cyndi Lauper, cover version by Anna Kendrick and Justin Timberlake)
4. Takahito Mura – West Side Story
5. Shae-Lynn Bourne-Turok – "Waka Waka (This Time for Africa)"
  (by Shakira)
6. Keiji Tanaka – "Hope"
  (by NF)
7. Violetta Afanasieva – "Last Dance"
  (by Donna Summer)
8. Jason Brown – "Adiós"
  (by Benjamin Clementine)
9. Satoko Miyahara – "Voilà"
  (by Barbara Pravi)
10. Javier Fernández – "Puttin' On the Ritz"
  (by Irving Berlin, remix)
11. Hanyu / Daichi – Carmina Burana
  (by Carl Orff)

Second half

12. Bourne-Turok / Hongo / Mura / Suzuki / Tanaka – "Permission to Dance"
  (by BTS; Hanyu's dance performance shown on screen)
13. Violetta Afanasieva – "The Light Shall Never Fade"
  (by Piotr Wójtowicz)
14. Jason Brown – "You Raise Me Up"
  (by Rolf Løvland and Brendan Graham, cover version by Josh Groban)
15. Satoko Miyahara – "One Last Dance"
16. Javier Fernández – "Prometo"
  (by Pablo Alborán)
17. Mura / Tanaka – Saturday Night Fever
  (by The Bee Gees)
18. Akiko Suzuki – "Love Dance"
  (from Kà by Cirque du Soleil)
19. Mao Daichi – Guys and Dolls / Anything Goes
  (performed with live ensemble)
20. Yuzuru Hanyu – "Danny Boy"
  (by Keith Jarrett)
21. Group finale – "Kibō no uta (Song of Hope)"
  (by Misia)
22. Show finale – "Sekai wa anata ni waraikakete iru"
  (by Little Glee Monster)

=== 2025 ===
First half

1. Yuzuru Hanyu – "Notte Stellata (The Swan)"
  (by Il Volo)
2. Group opening – "Twinkling Stars of Hope"
  (by Karl Hugo)
3. Rika Hongo – "Sparrow"
4. Takahito Mura – "Starting Over"
5. Keiji Tanaka – "The Loneliest"
6. Violetta Afanasieva – "Breathe Underwater"
7. Jason Brown – "Spiegel im Spiegel"
8. Javier Fernández – "Prometo"
  (by Pablo Alborán)
9. Collaboration: MANSAI Bolero × notte stellata – (Mansai Nomura, Yuzuru Hanyu, Shae-Lynn Bourne, Satoko Miyahara, Akiko Suzuki, Takahito Mura, Keiji Tanaka)

Second half

12. Collaboration: Yuzuru Hanyu x Mansai Nomura – "SEIMEI"
13. Violetta Afanasieva – "Sing"
14. Akiko Suzuki – "Songs My Mother Taught Me"
15. Jason Brown – "The Legend of Tarzan"
16. Satoko Miyahara – "Walking in the Air"
17. Shae-Lynn Bourne – "BOM BOM BOM"
18. Javier Fernández – "Puttin' On the Ritz"
  (by Irving Berlin, remix)
19. Yuzuru Hanyu – "Haru yo, koi"
  (by Yumi Matsutoya, piano version by Shinya Kiyozuka)
20. Group finale – "Kibō no uta (Song of Hope)"
  (by Misia)
21. Show finale – "Dance Hall"
  (by Mrs. Green Apple)

=== 2026 ===
First half

1. Yuzuru Hanyu – "Notte Stellata (The Swan)"
  (by Il Volo)
2. Group opening – "Twinkling Stars of Hope"
  (by Karl Hugo)
3. Rika Hongo – "Sparrow"
4. Akiko Suzuki - "Chopin's Farewell Waltz"
5. Takahito Mura – "Kaerou"
  (by Fujii Kaze)
6. Violetta Afanasieva – "A cool cat in town"
7. Jason Brown – "Spiegel im Spiegel"
8. Javier Fernández – "Prometo"
  (by Pablo Alborán)
9. Tohoku Youth Orchestra - Merry Christmas, Mr. Lawrence
10. Collaboration: Yuzuru Hanyu x Tohoku Youth Orchestra - "Happy End"

Second half

11. Collaboration: Tohoku Youth Orchestra x Shae-Lynn Bourne, Satoko Miyahara, Akiko Suzuki, Keiji Tanaka, Takahito Mura - "Little Buddha"
12. Violetta Afanasieva – "Le Freak"
13. Shae-Lynn Bourne – "La cumparsita"
14. Javier Fernández – "You are so beautiful"
15. Keiji Tanaka - "Your Name"
16. Satoko Miyahara - "Is Paris Burning"
  (by Takashi Kako)
17. Jason Brown – "Spiegel im Spiegel"
18. Collaboration: Yuzuru Hanyu x Tohoku Youth Orchestra - "Yae no Sakura"
19. Group finale – "Kibō no uta (Song of Hope)"
  (by Misia)
20. Show finale – "Etude" (Tohoku Youth Orchestra)

== See also ==
- 2011 Tōhoku earthquake and tsunami
- Humanitarian response to the 2011 Tōhoku earthquake and tsunami
- Reconstruction Agency
- Disaster Prevention Day

== Notes and references ==
=== Print works cited ===
- Kawagoe, Seiki; Kazama, So; Mimura, Mobuo; Yasuhara, Kazuya; Yokoki, Hiromune (May 21, 2011). "Damage from the Great East Japan Earthquake and Tsunami – A quick report". Mitigation and Adaptation Strategies for Global Change. 16 (7). New York City: Springer: 803–818. Bibcode:2011MASGC..16..803M. doi:10.1007/s11027-011-9297-7.
- Notte Stellata official (March 10, 2023). Yuzuru Hanyu Notte Stellata – official pamphlet (in Japanese). Shibuya, Tokyo: Nippon TV. Archived from the original on March 11, 2023.
