= Great Kantō Earthquake =

1923 megathrust earthquake in Japan

- 関東大地震, Kantō daijishin 関東大震災, Kantō daishinsai
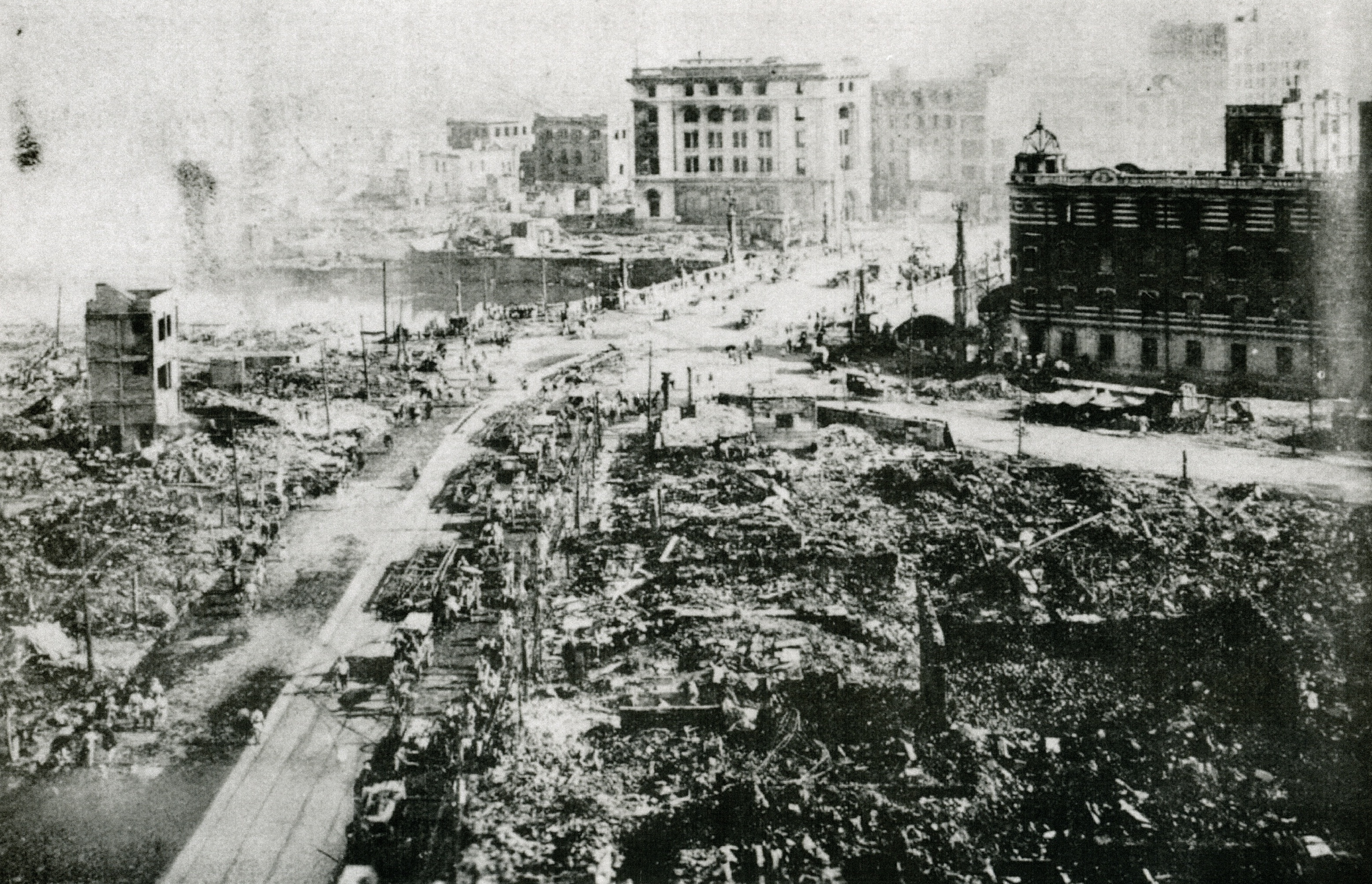
- Ruins of the Nihonbashi district of Tokyo
- UTC time: 1923-09-01 02:58:32
- ISC event: 911526
- USGS-ANSS: ComCat
- Local date: 1 September 1923
- Local time: 11:58:32 JST (UTC+09:00)
- Duration: 4 min 48 sec
- Magnitude: 7.9–8.2 M_{w}
- Depth: 23 km (14 mi)
- Epicenter: 35°19.6′N 139°8.3′E
- Fault: Sagami Trough
- Type: Megathrust
- Areas affected: Japan
- Max. intensity: MMI XI (Extreme) JMA 7 (estimated)
- Peak acceleration: ~ 0.41 g (est); ~ 400 gal (est)
- Tsunami: Up to 12 m (39 ft) in Atami, Shizuoka, Tōkai
- Landslides: Yes
- Aftershocks: 6 of 7.0 M or higher
- Casualties: 105,385 dead or missing

The Great Kantō Earthquake (Japanese: 関東大地震, Kantō daijishin, or 関東大震災, Kantō daishinsai) was a megathrust earthquake that struck the Kantō Plain on the main Japanese island of Honshu at 11:58:32 JST (02:58:32 UTC) on Saturday, 1 September 1923. It had an approximate magnitude of 8.0 on the moment magnitude scale (M_{w}), with its epicenter located some 100 km (62 mi) southwest of the capital Tokyo. The earthquake devastated Tokyo, the port city of Yokohama, and the surrounding prefectures of Kanagawa, Chiba, and Shizuoka, causing widespread damage throughout the Kantō region.

The event was a complex disaster, with modern research indicating it consisted of three consecutive shocks in the span of several minutes. The initial megathrust event in Kanagawa Prefecture was followed three minutes later by a magnitude 7.2 earthquake centered beneath Tokyo Bay, and two minutes after that by a magnitude 7.3 shock in Yamanashi Prefecture. Fires, exacerbated by strong winds from a nearby typhoon, spread rapidly through the densely populated urban areas, accounting for the majority of the devastation and casualties. The death toll is estimated to have been between 105,000 and 140,000 people, including tens of thousands who went missing and were presumed dead. Over half of Tokyo and nearly all of Yokohama were destroyed, leaving approximately 2.5 million people homeless. The disaster triggered widespread social unrest, including the Kantō Massacre, in which ethnic Koreans and others mistaken for them were murdered by vigilante groups based on false rumors.

In the aftermath, the Japanese government declared martial law and undertook extensive relief and restoration efforts. The earthquake prompted ambitious plans for the reconstruction of Tokyo, aiming to create a modern, resilient imperial capital under the leadership of Home Minister Gotō Shinpei. However, these plans were often met with political contestation, financial constraints, and local resistance, leading to a reconstruction that, while significantly improving infrastructure, fell short of the grandest visions. The disaster also fueled debates about national identity, modernity, and societal values, with many commentators interpreting the event as a divine punishment for perceived moral decline and advocating for spiritual and social regeneration.

The Great Kantō Earthquake remains a pivotal event in modern Japanese history, profoundly impacting urban planning, disaster preparedness, and social consciousness. 1 September is commemorated annually in Japan as Disaster Prevention Day.

== Earthquake and immediate impact ==
The Kantō region of eastern Japan is prone to major earthquakes due to its location near complex tectonic plate boundaries. The 1923 earthquake occurred when the Philippine Sea Plate subducted beneath the Okhotsk Plate (sometimes considered part of the North American Plate) along the Sagami Trough. The initial shock, occurring at 11:58:32 JST on 1 September 1923, was a complex event. Modern analysis indicates a dual rupture on a broad trench-type fault: the first rupture occurred near Odawara in Kanagawa Prefecture, some 100 km (62 mi) southwest of Tokyo, followed about ten seconds later by a second shock on the other side of Sagami Bay near the Miura Peninsula. This was followed minutes later by two major aftershocks: a magnitude 7.2 earthquake beneath northern Tokyo Bay at 12:01, and a magnitude 7.3 earthquake in Yamanashi Prefecture at 12:03. Survivor accounts consistently describe these three distinct seismic events.

The earthquake immediately toppled structures, crushed people, and caused widespread panic. Survivor accounts describe an initial period of stunned silence followed by a frantic rush as people tried to reunite with family and salvage belongings. Engineer Mononobe Nagao recalled the earth shaking "back and forth for what seemed like 15 seconds", followed by violent vertical convulsions that knocked people to the ground. Writer Tanaka Kōtarō described the sound as akin to a giant "blackening whirlwind" churning up the earth from "deep underground".

=== Fires and pandemonium ===
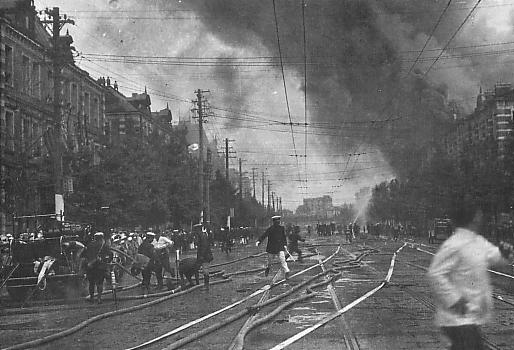
Marunouchi in flames

Within 30 minutes of the first tremor, more than 130 major fires broke out across Tokyo, particularly in the densely populated eastern and northeastern sections. These fires were fueled by overturned charcoal braziers used for midday meals, leaking gas from ruptured lines, and flammable debris from collapsed wooden buildings. Strong winds, associated with a typhoon passing off the coast, fanned the flames, creating massive firestorms that swept through the city. The air temperature in some areas reached 46 °C (115 °F).

The combination of ongoing aftershocks and rapidly spreading fires led to pandemonium. Millions of residents attempted to flee, often carrying their possessions, which clogged the already damaged streets and bridges. Kawatake Shigetoshi described being trapped in a "wave of people" in eastern Tokyo, unable to move as fires approached from multiple directions. Many sought refuge in open spaces, such as parks and the grounds surrounding the Imperial Palace, but these areas quickly became overcrowded. Waterways like the Sumida River also became congested with boats as people tried to escape by water, only to face sparks and burning debris falling from the sky. The disaster quickly overwhelmed Tokyo's infrastructure and its capacity for an orderly evacuation.

== Damage and devastation ==
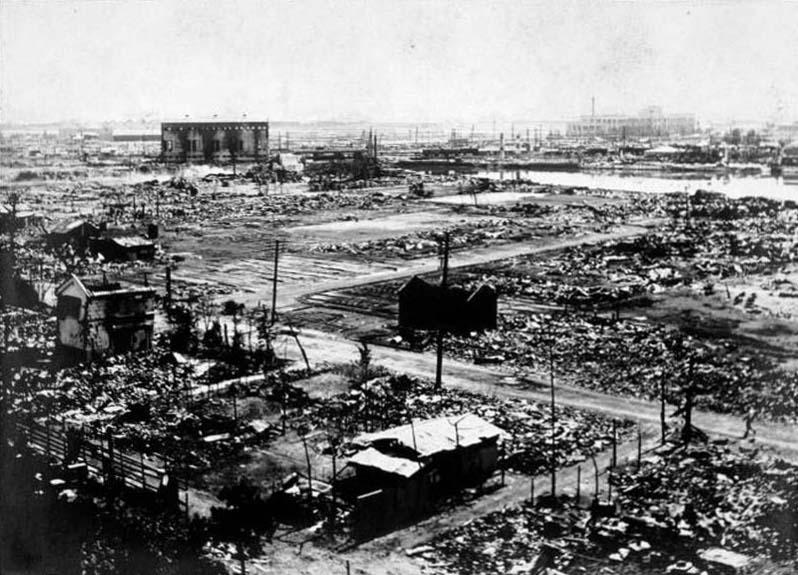
View of destruction in Yokohama

The Great Kantō Earthquake was one of the most destructive natural disasters of the 20th century. Roughly half of Tokyo and virtually all of Yokohama were transformed into "blackened, corpse-strewn wastelands". The earthquake and subsequent fires destroyed an estimated 397,119 homes in Tokyo Prefecture alone, leaving about 1.38 million people homeless in Tokyo City. Across the seven affected prefectures (Tokyo, Kanagawa, Chiba, Saitama, Shizuoka, Yamanashi, and Ibaraki), a total of 2.5 million people were displaced.

The physical destruction was immense. In addition to buildings, the earthquake buckled roads, collapsed bridges (362 destroyed and 70 heavily damaged in Tokyo), twisted train tracks, snapped water and sewer pipes, and severed telegraph lines. Tokyo's main aqueduct from Wadabori collapsed in two places and required extensive repairs. The sea floor in Sagami Bay dropped by over 400 meters (1,300 ft) at the epicenter, triggering tsunamis that inundated low-lying coastal communities.

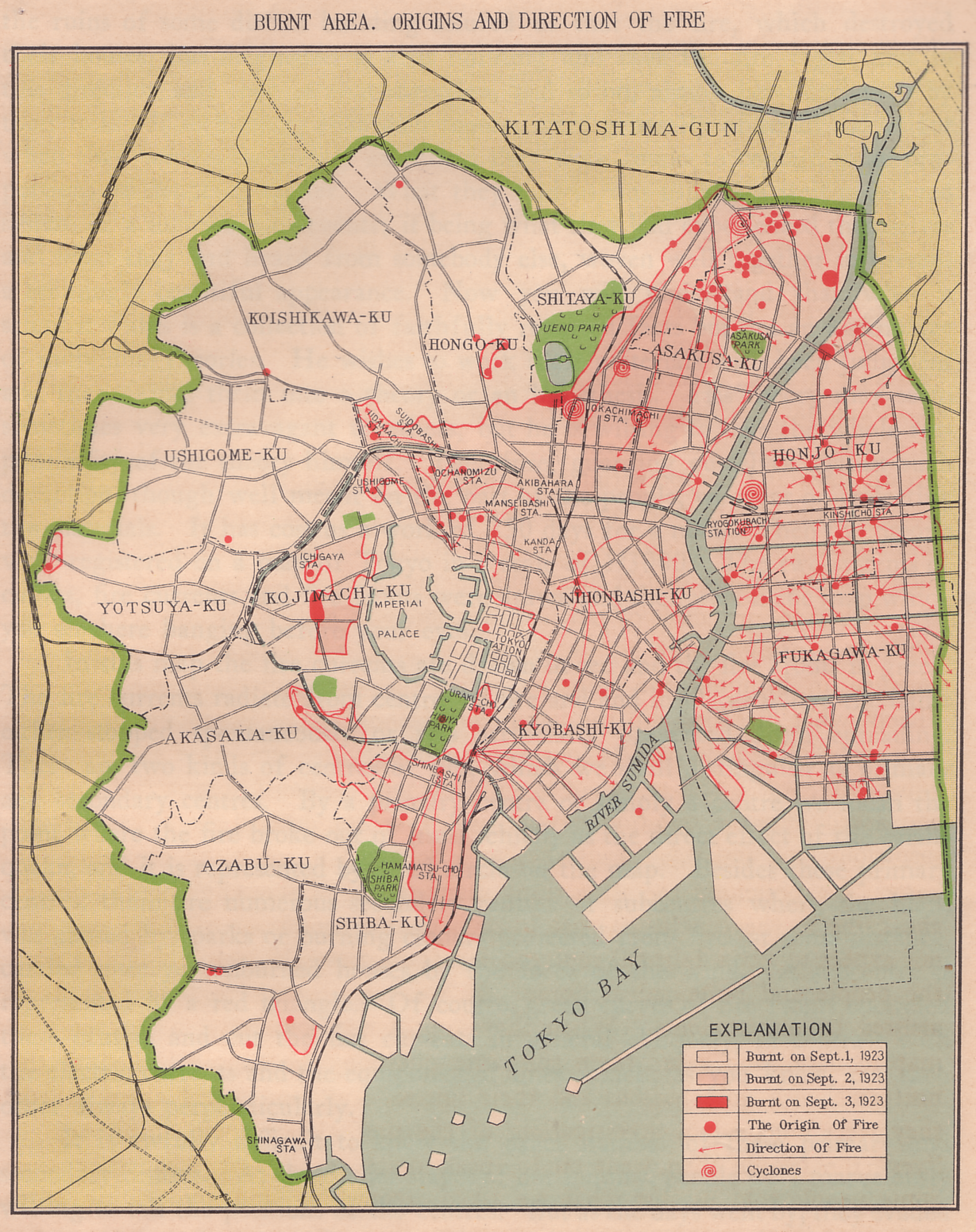
Map of the burned areas in Tokyo

Fires were the primary cause of destruction, accounting for 90 percent of the fatalities. In Tokyo, districts like Asakusa, Kanda, Nihonbashi, Kyōbashi, Honjo, and Fukagawa were largely incinerated. The Honjo Clothing Depot, a large open area where tens of thousands sought refuge, became a death trap when a massive tatsumaki (whirlwind of fire) engulfed it, killing an estimated 40,000 people in minutes. Survivor Koizumi Tomi described the site as "hell on earth", surrounded by "endless rows of bodies: red, inflamed bodies; black, swollen bodies; bodies partially buried under ash and smoldering remains".

The government administration was crippled. In Tokyo, 44 percent of the main buildings burned to the ground, including the police headquarters and the ministries of Home Affairs, Finance, Education, Communications, and Railways. The vast majority of police stations and municipal and ward offices crumbled or burned. Out of Tokyo's 196 primary schools, 117 were destroyed, along with numerous higher girls' schools, trade schools, colleges, and universities. Social welfare facilities, including public dining halls, cheap lodging homes, and crèches, were annihilated. Over 160 public and private hospitals in Tokyo were destroyed.

The economic impact was also severe. The disaster exacerbated the economic downturn of the early 1920s and contributed to a genuine banking crisis in 1927. Roughly 7,000 factories were destroyed, including major spinning, dyeing, and tool manufacturing plants. Financial institutions suffered heavily, with 121 of 138 bank head offices and 222 of 310 branch offices in Tokyo City consumed by fire or reduced to rubble. Insurance policies offered little relief, as most contained clauses exempting companies from earthquake-related damage; eventually, the government intervened to facilitate partial payouts. Reconstruction brought a new surge of imports and, under these combined pressures, an early return to the gold standard was impossible. The disaster also led to significant unemployment. In September 1923, the unemployment rate in the wards of Tokyo reached 45% (59% for men, 28% for women). By 15 November, across Tokyo Prefecture, 178,887 people were registered as unemployed, with the commerce and industry sectors most affected.

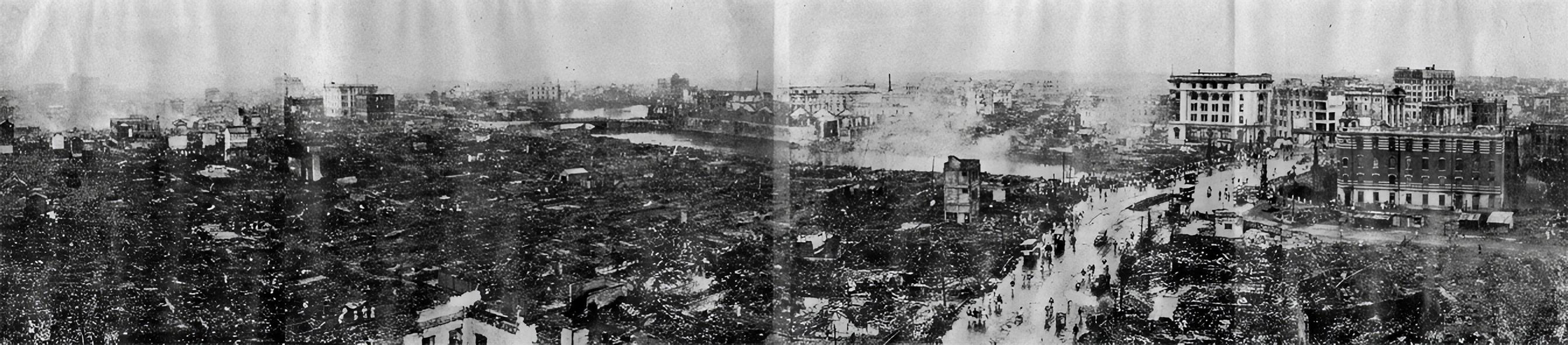
Ruins of Nihonbashi and Kanda, as seen from the roof of Dai-ichi Sogo building in Kyōbashi

== Casualties ==
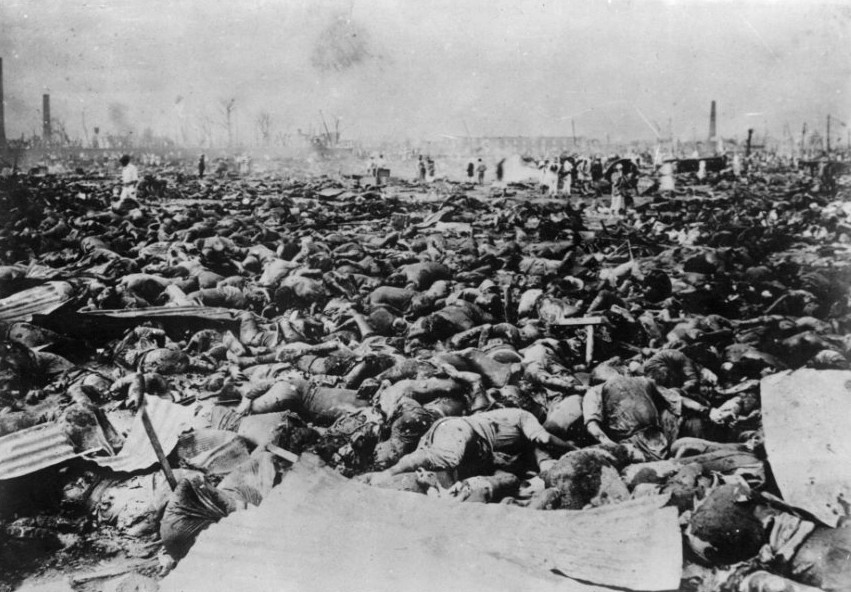
Dead bodies at the site of the Honjo Clothing Depot

The human toll of the Great Kantō Earthquake was catastrophic. Early estimates put the death toll as high as 140,000, but modern research based on the 1923 Great Kantō Earthquake Disaster Report puts the total number of fatalities at 105,385. Of these, 91,781 deaths (87%) were attributed to fires, while 11,086 (10.5%) were due to being crushed by collapsing buildings. Other causes included drowning and landslides. Kanagawa Prefecture suffered 32,838 deaths, while Tokyo Prefecture had 70,387. An additional 13,275 people remained classified as missing twelve months after the earthquake.

People died in numerous ways: crushed by collapsing buildings, trampled in panicked crowds, burned alive in the fires, or drowned in rivers and canals while attempting to escape the flames. Some victims suffocated as fires consumed oxygen, while others were boiled alive in ponds offering no protection from the intense heat. The smell of burning human flesh and decaying bodies permeated the air for weeks. Disposing of the dead became a major public health concern, leading to mass cremations, particularly at the Honjo Clothing Depot.

== Social unrest and breakdown of order ==
In the immediate aftermath of the earthquake, law and order broke down in many parts of the affected region. This period was characterized by the spread of rumors, the formation of vigilante groups (jikeidan), and the massacre of ethnic Koreans and others mistaken for them, as well as the murder of political activists by the authorities.

=== Rumors and misinformation ===
Widespread destruction of communication infrastructure contributed to an atmosphere of uncertainty and fear. Rumors spread rapidly, often relayed by refugees fleeing the disaster zone. Some stories suggested that Mount Fuji had erupted or that a large tsunami had washed away Yokohama. The most damaging rumors, however, concerned alleged activities by Koreans. Originating from looting by Japanese in Yokohama that was misattributed to Koreans, false reports circulated that Koreans were poisoning wells, committing arson, looting, and organizing attacks on Japanese. These rumors were given a degree of legitimacy when some government officials, including Gotō Fumio of the Home Ministry, broadcast messages warning of "organized groups of Korean extremists" attempting to "commit acts of sedition". On 2 September, the police headquarters, lacking manpower to confirm eyewitness reports, passed them on as factual and issued a statement that "unscrupulous Koreans are committing acts of arson and other forms of violence".

=== Massacre of Koreans and others ===
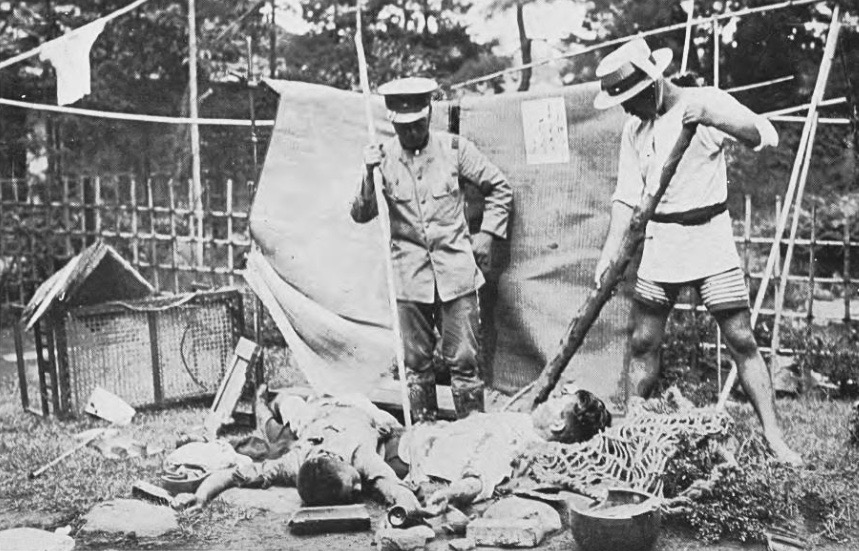
A jikeidan (neighborhood vigilance group) in post-earthquake Tokyo, with murdered Koreans

Fueled by these rumors and a climate of fear and xenophobia, Japanese vigilante groups, known as jikeidan, formed across the Kantō region. By mid-September, an estimated 3,689 such groups were operating, ostensibly to prevent fires, stop looting, and maintain order. However, many of these groups, often armed with makeshift weapons like clubs, swords, and bamboo spears, targeted Koreans and, in some cases, Chinese, Okinawans, and Japanese from certain regions who were mistaken for Koreans due to their accents.

Estimates of the death toll in what became known as the Kantō Massacre vary significantly. Police confirmed the deaths of 248 Koreans, while an investigation by the Governor-General of Korea determined 832 had been killed or were missing. A separate investigation by Korean students concluded that 2,613 Koreans had been killed; some modern estimates reach as high as 6,000. Victims were often subjected to brutal violence, including beatings, stabbings, and lynchings, sometimes after being "tested" for their Korean identity (e.g., by being asked to pronounce Japanese words that were difficult for Koreans). While some police and military personnel attempted to protect Koreans, others were complicit in the violence or turned a blind eye. Although police made belated corrections to the rumors on 3 and 4 September, few perpetrators were prosecuted; of 125 vigilante group members tried, only 32 received formal sentences, and 91 received suspended sentences. Contemporary commentators like Hoashi Ri'ichirō and Oku Hidesaburō condemned the massacres as "extremely disgusting and internationally shameful" and a "disgraceful act that exposed a moral flaw".

The chaos also provided a cover for the murder of political dissidents. The most prominent case was the Amakasu Incident, in which the anarchist Sakae Ōsugi, his partner Noe Itō, and his six-year-old nephew were arrested and then brutally killed by a squad of military police led by Lieutenant Masahiko Amakasu. Others killed by the military police included the socialist Hirasawa Keishichi (平澤計七), and the Chinese community leader Wang Xitian (王希天).

=== Cabinet response and martial law ===
The earthquake struck at a time of political uncertainty in Japan. Prime Minister Katō Tomosaburō had died on 24 August, and Admiral Yamamoto Gonnohyōe, selected to form a new cabinet, had not yet succeeded when the disaster occurred. The disaster also forced the postponement of Crown Prince Hirohito's marriage and accession ceremonies. This elite-level political vacuum contributed to confusion over who had the authority to deploy police and military personnel. General Ishimitsu Maomi, deputy commander of the Imperial Guard Forces, acted first, deploying troops to protect imperial locations. Akaike Atsushi, inspector general of the Tokyo Metropolitan Police, faced an overwhelming task with outnumbered and unprepared forces. The new cabinet was formally appointed on the afternoon of 2 September, sworn in on the lawn of the Akasaka Detached Palace amid falling ash, as other ministerial buildings were deemed unsafe.

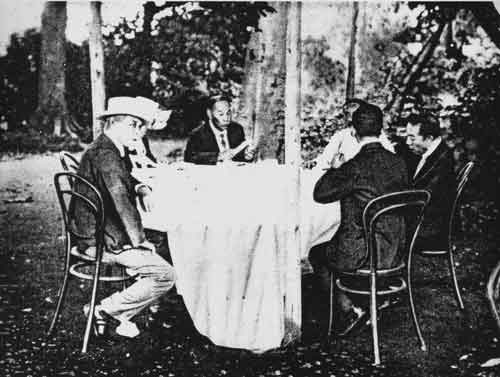
Prime Minister Yamamoto Gonnohyōe (left) holding a cabinet meeting outdoors for fear of further building collapses amid aftershocks

One of the first decisions of the new cabinet was to declare martial law over what remained of the capital on 2 September. This ushered in the largest peacetime domestic mobilization and deployment of the army in Japan's pre–World War II history, with eventually over 52,000 troops deployed to Tokyo and Yokohama. The martial law headquarters was granted extensive powers, including administering relief and public safety, prosecuting lawbreakers, prohibiting public gatherings, censoring information, stopping and searching individuals, and entering private homes. Martial law remained in effect until 15 November.

Initial military deployment was fraught with difficulties. Commanders arriving in Tokyo found a near total absence of reliable information and lines of communication were non-existent. The military had to rely on aerial reconnaissance and around 2,000 army-trained carrier pigeons for communication. The zone of martial law was progressively expanded to cover all of Tokyo and Kanagawa Prefectures by 3 September, and Chiba and Saitama Prefectures by 4 September. To counter rumors and vigilante violence, particularly against Koreans, military authorities were empowered to arrest individuals, disband suspicious groups, and confiscate weapons. From 4 September, military and police began to collect and transport Koreans to government-run detention centers for "protective custody"; by the end of September, 23,715 Koreans had been taken into these centers.

== Relief efforts ==
The Yamamoto cabinet created the Emergency Earthquake Relief Bureau (Rinji shinsai kyūgo jimukyoku) to oversee all relief and recovery efforts.

=== Medical aid ===
Providing emergency medical assistance was an immediate priority, but initial efforts were largely unsuccessful. Many organized rescue and first aid squads were unable to reach the worst-hit areas like Honjo, Asakusa, and Kanda until 4 or 5 September due to destroyed infrastructure and unofficial checkpoints by vigilante groups. A dearth of medical supplies, due to the destruction of numerous hospitals and dispensaries, further hampered efforts. The Relief Bureau concentrated its limited medical resources at large open areas like Hibiya Park and Ueno Park, where tens of thousands of refugees had congregated.

Over the longer term, mobile clinics and dispensaries proved most effective. The Relief Bureau created 41 units, and other organizations like Tokyo Prefecture, the Japan Red Cross Society, and the Mitsubishi Corporation also operated mobile clinics. By 30 November, these public and private clinics had provided care to 447,111 sufferers. Temporary hospitals, some in tents donated by American and French governments, accommodated over 6,000 seriously wounded people.

=== Food and water ===
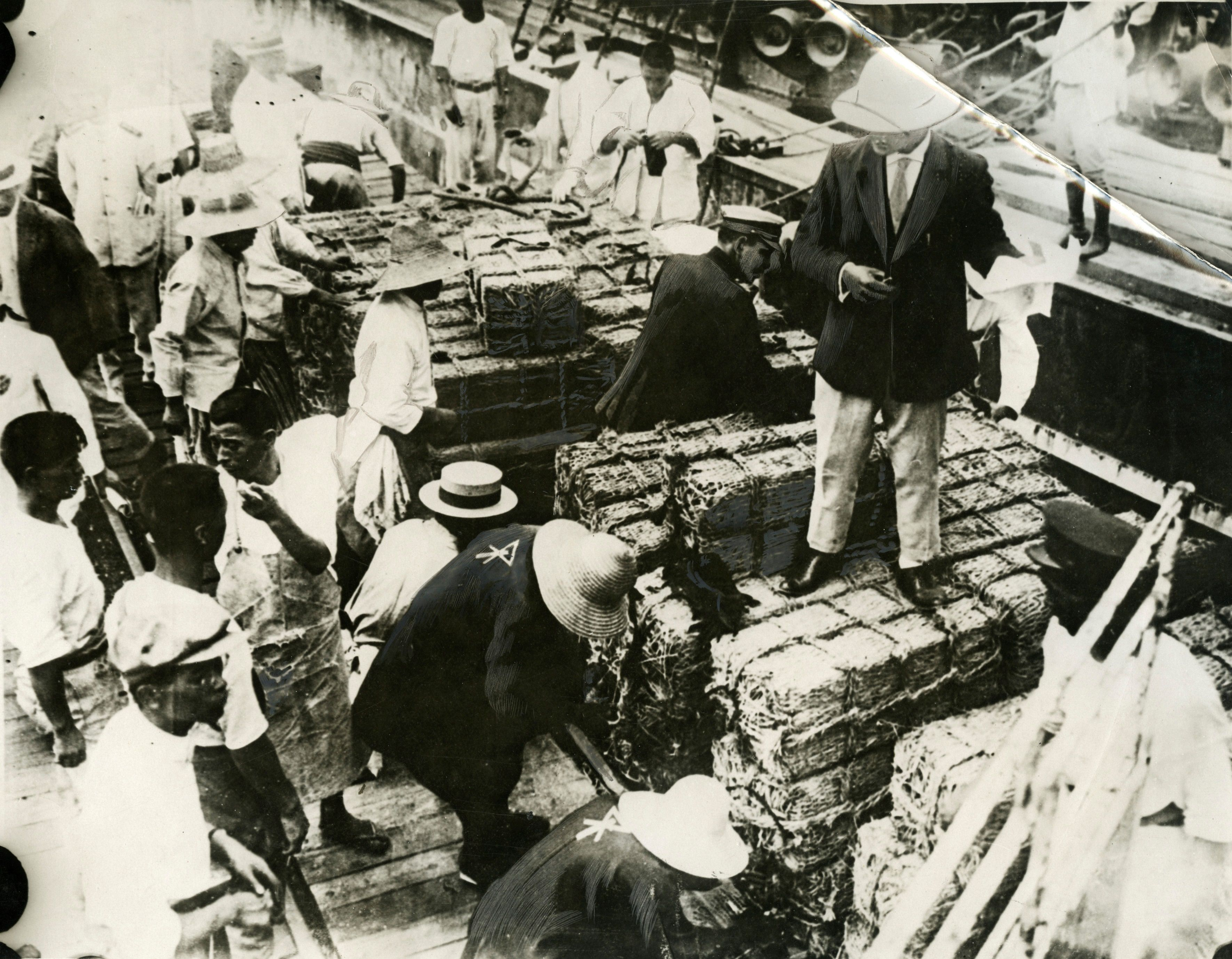
Relief supplies in Osaka being prepared to be brought to Tokyo

Securing food and water was a critical challenge. Mayor Hidejirō Nagata learned on 2 September that the army's main supply depot in Fukagawa, holding 8,000 koku of rice (enough to feed over 500,000 people for six days), had been completely destroyed by fire. The military managed to amass over 120,000 combat rations and 60,000 rations of rice from other stores. By 4 September, military units were distributing dried noodles. Eventually, 74,048 koku of rice were transported from military installations across Japan to distribution centers in Tokyo and Yokohama.

The government also appealed to prefectural governors for rice donations, receiving pledges of 61,490 koku in the first week. An "Emergency Requisition Ordinance" allowed the government to requisition foodstuffs and other materials. Transporting these supplies was a major logistical challenge due to damaged rail lines and docks. Navy personnel spent a week repairing 86 piers at Shibaura and Ryōgoku, while army forces cleared railway lines and rebuilt track. Conservative estimates suggest that 1.25 million people received rice distributions between 6 and 10 September.

Water supply was an even more significant problem. Tokyo's main water plant was not heavily damaged, but pipes and aquifers were severed in over two hundred locations. Warships tanked water from Yokosuka, Osaka, and Nagoya, and the army requisitioned water barrels to transport clean water. By the end of December, nearly 40 million gallons (151 million liters) of drinking water had been transported.

=== Relocation and shelter ===
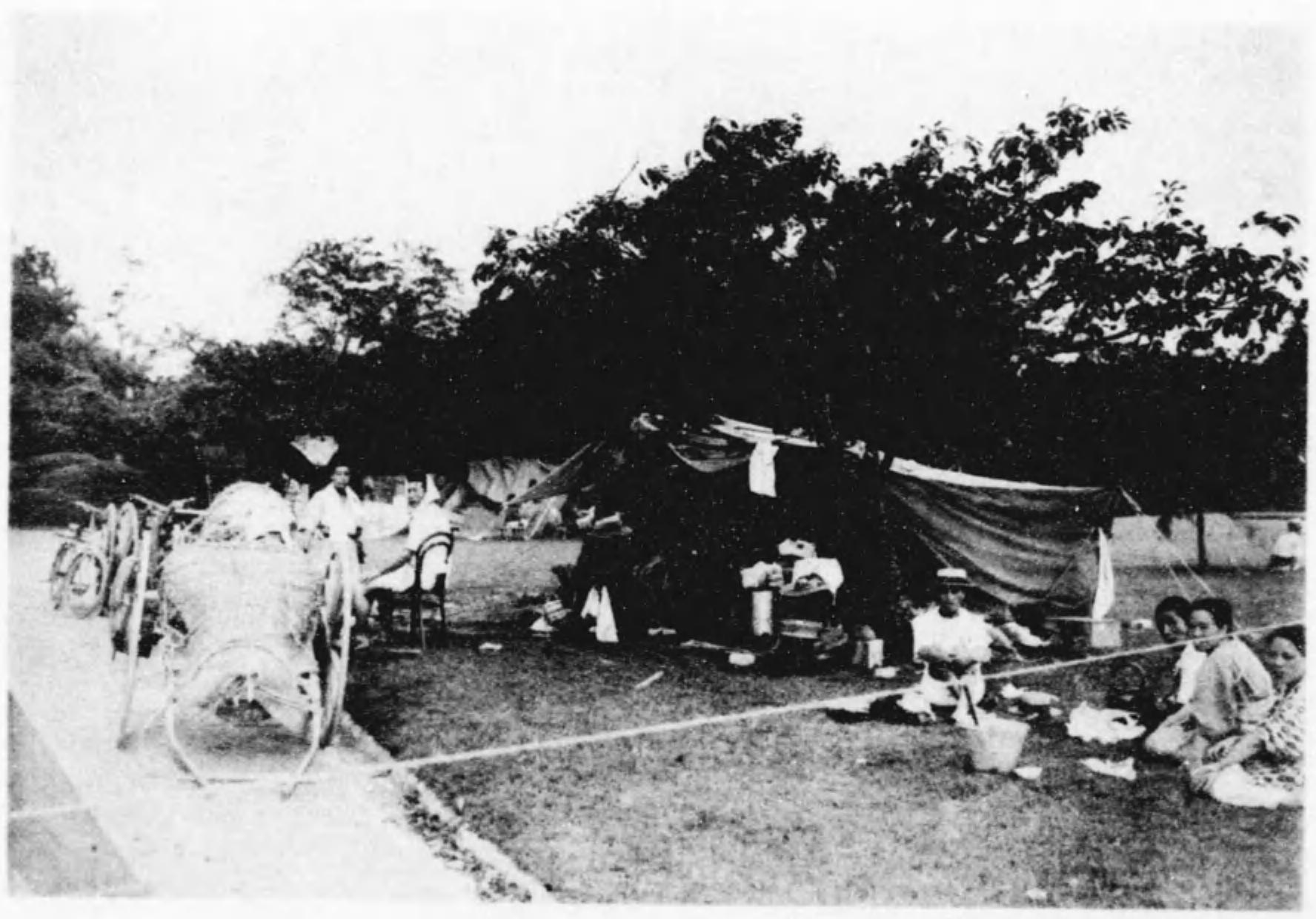
Refugees taking shelter in Shinjuku Gyoen after the earthquake. Parks and open spaces became temporary homes for many of the displaced.

Shelter options were bleak for Tokyo Prefecture's 1.55 million homeless. Nearly 800,000 people left Tokyo or Yokohama, first on foot and later via restricted rail service (from 11 September), to stay with relatives or friends elsewhere. About 250,000 people dispersed to other parts of Japan, including 17,704 to Kobe, 7,600 to Hokkaidō, and some even to Japan's colonies like Taiwan and Karafuto.

Those remaining in Tokyo flooded large open spaces such as Hibiya Park, Ueno Park, and the Imperial Palace grounds. On 9 September, municipal authorities began constructing temporary barracks. The Meiji Shrine site housed nearly 6,000 refugees, Ueno Park over 9,500, and Hibiya Park 7,000. Many of these open spaces became shantytowns. Barracks were often cramped, with an average of 0.6 tsubo (about 2 square meters (22 sq ft)) of floor space per person. Sanitation was a major problem, with makeshift latrines overflowing. While a modest number of refugees left barrack housing by the end of 1923, many more returned to the disaster zone and erected private makeshift shacks. By October 1923, 539,450 people were living in 111,791 such temporary abodes.

== Interpretations and social impact ==
=== Disaster as a national tragedy ===
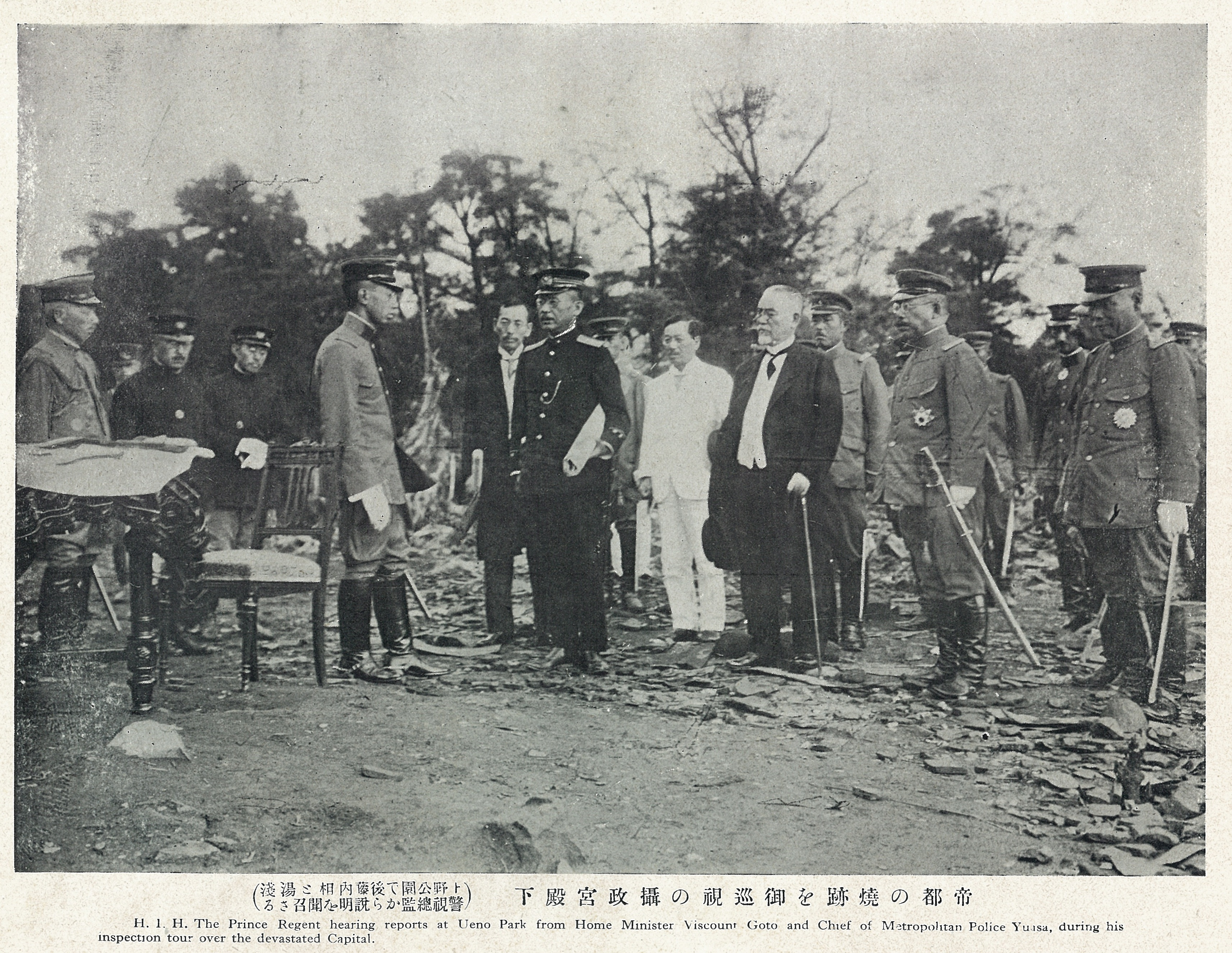
Prince Regent Hirohito (later Emperor) hearing reports at Ueno Park from Home Minister Gotō Shinpei and Chief of the Tokyo Metropolitan Police Yuasa, during his inspection tour of the devastated capital, September 1923

Government officials and media outlets made concerted efforts to construct the Great Kantō Earthquake as an unprecedented national calamity, requiring a unified national response. Newspapers, the chief medium for disseminating news, played a lead role. Major papers like the Tokyo Nichi Nichi Shinbun, Osaka Asahi Shinbun, and Osaka Mainichi Shinbun used emotive headlines, harrowing survivor accounts, vivid photographs, and even documentary motion pictures to convey the disaster's horror and scale to a national audience. These portrayals often framed the disaster in terms of wartime analogies, emphasizing themes of sacrifice and national unity.

The forty-ninth-day memorial service held on 19 October 1923, at the site of the Honjo Clothing Depot, attended by over 200,000 people and leading politicians, was a meticulously choreographed event. Speeches by figures like Gizō Kasuya and Shōzaburō Horie explicitly linked the victims' sacrifices to the future reconstruction of Tokyo and Japan, urging national unity and effort. Visual culture, including lithographic prints and postcards, also played a significant role in disseminating the image of a devastated but resilient capital, and of a concerned government responding to the crisis. Postcards depicting dead bodies, while sometimes classified as contraband, were widespread and brought the human cost of the disaster to a national audience in a stark manner.

=== Divine punishment and moral admonishment ===
A widespread interpretation, embraced by numerous elites across various sectors of society, was that the earthquake was an act of divine punishment (tenken or tenbatsu) or heavenly warning. This view was not confined to religious leaders but was articulated by bureaucrats, politicians, academics, and social commentators. The disaster was seen as a response to Japan's perceived moral decline, materialism, luxury-mindedness, hedonism, and excessive individualism that had become prominent since World War I.

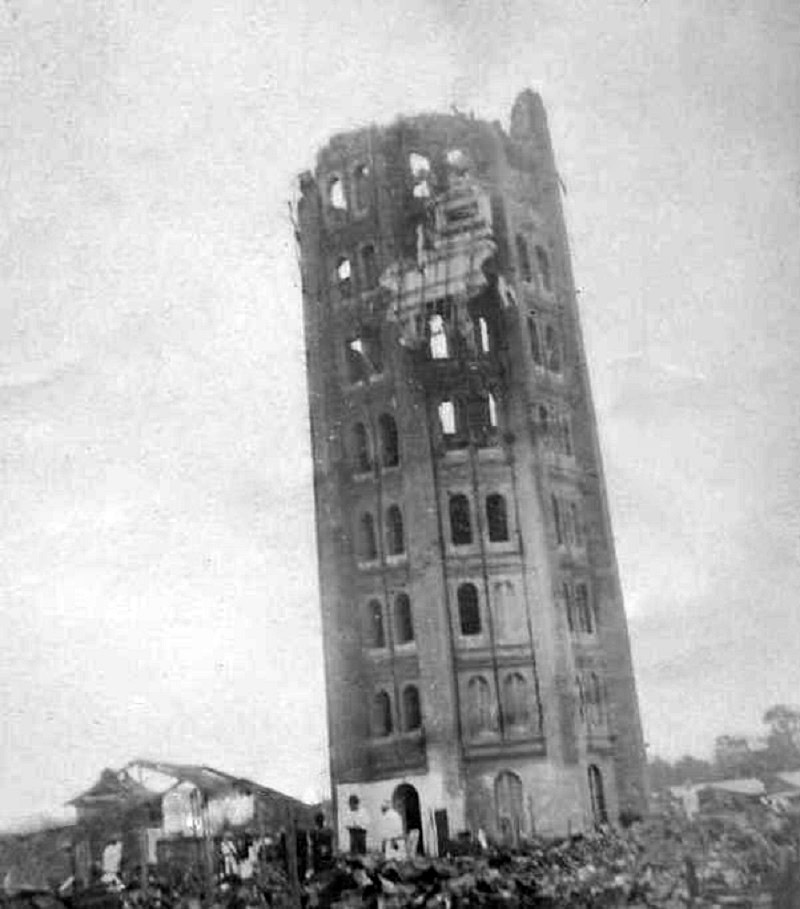
Ruined Ryōunkaku tower in Asakusa

The entertainment districts of Tokyo, such as Asakusa, and centers of consumer spending, like the Ginza, were often singled out as epicenters of this perceived degeneracy and thus seen as specifically targeted by the heavens. The destruction of icons of modern consumerism, such as the Mitsukoshi Department Store and the twelve-story Ryōunkaku tower in Asakusa, was imbued with symbolic meaning. This interpretation served as a cosmological bolster for critiques of contemporary society and legitimated calls for social, moral, and ideological reform. The earthquake was thus framed as a moral wake-up call, placing Japan at a crossroads between decline and renovation.

=== Spiritual renewal and fiscal retrenchment ===
The interpretation of the earthquake as divine admonishment fueled calls for national spiritual renewal (seishin fukkō) and economic moderation. An Imperial Rescript Regarding the Invigoration of the National Spirit, issued on 10 November 1923, became a foundational document for this movement. It urged Japanese people to reject frivolousness, extravagance, and extreme tendencies, and to embrace simplicity, sincerity, fortitude, diligence, thrift, moderation, loyalty, and filial piety.

Government campaigns, such as the 1924 Campaign for the Encouragement of Diligence and Thrift (Kinken shōrei undō), employed the memory of the earthquake to promote austerity and national savings. Policies like the 1924 luxury tariff, which placed a 100 percent duty on a wide range of imported goods deemed luxuries, aimed to curb consumer spending and foster economic self-discipline. While these measures had mixed results in altering consumer behavior in the long term, they reflected a broader elite concern with reorienting Japanese society towards more traditional and disciplined values. The push for spiritual renewal also involved using schools, neighborhood associations, and new media like film and radio to inculcate desired moral values.

== Reconstruction ==
=== Visions for a new capital ===
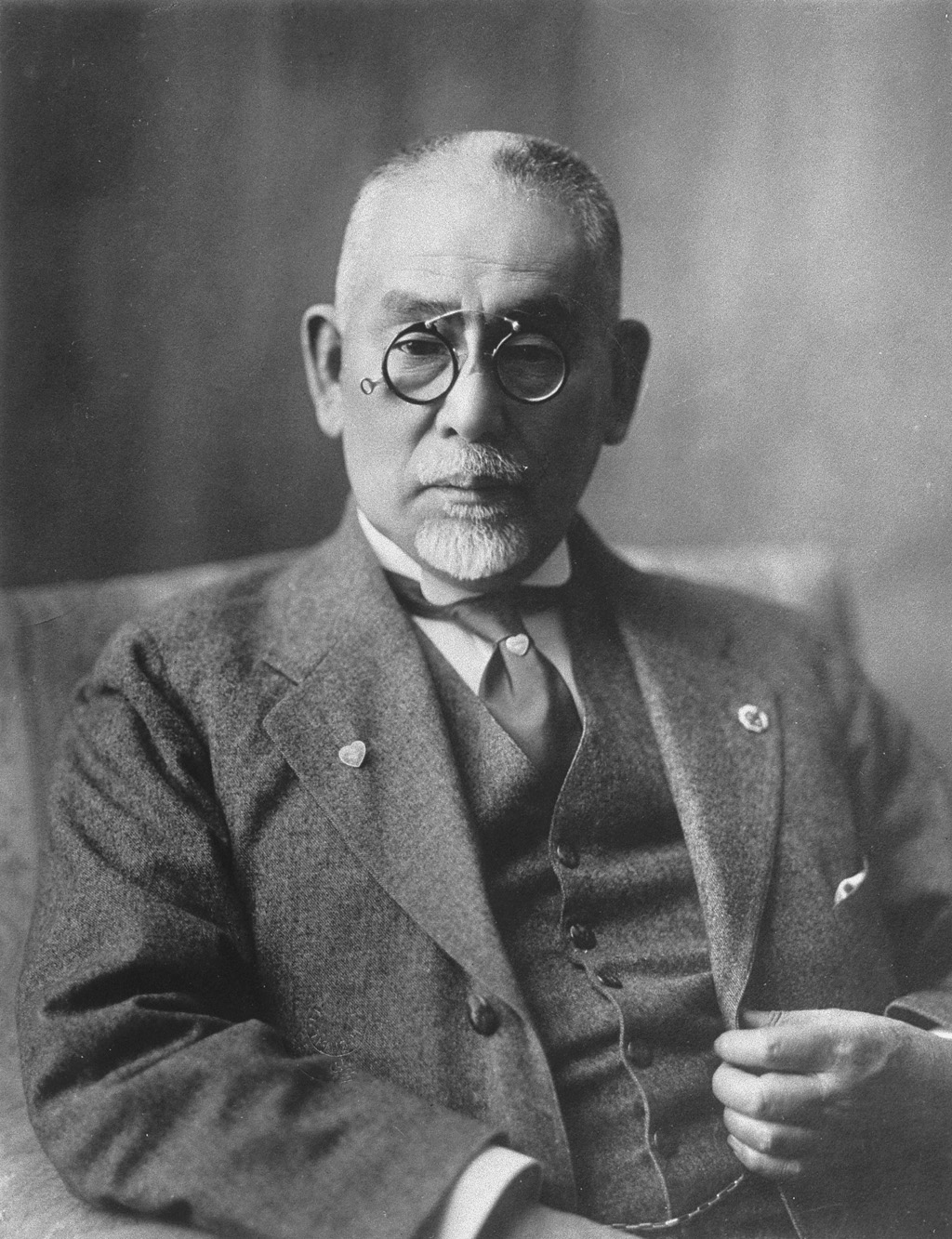
Gotō Shinpei, Home Minister and head of the Reconstruction Institute

The devastation of Tokyo unleashed a wave of optimism among many bureaucrats, urban planners, and social reformers, who saw an unparalleled opportunity to rebuild the city as a modern, rational, and resilient metropolis. Figures like Gotō Shinpei, Abe Isoo, and Fukuda Tokuzō argued that "old Tokyo" had been a breeding ground for social ills due to overcrowding, poor sanitation, poverty, and inadequate infrastructure. The earthquake, they believed, created a chance to rectify these problems and construct a capital that would reflect new social values and assist the state in managing its subjects. The disorientation and destruction offered a "free field" for new ideas, but reconstruction under Gotō's direction was swift.

Many visions for the new Tokyo were influenced by "authoritarian high modernism," emphasizing state-led planning, technical and scientific progress, and intervention in many aspects of human life, from public health and housing to urban layout and transportation. Plans called for wider, paved streets, extensive green belts and parks, modern public housing, new sanitation systems, and improved transportation networks. Some, like Gotō Shinpei, envisioned a grand imperial capital that would project Japan's emerging power and prestige on the international stage, hoping to create a city that matched Paris and Berlin. On 12 September, Regent Hirohito issued an imperial rescript calling for "not only to restore the city to its previous state, but also to allow for future developments and to provide the city with a renewed appearance."

=== Political contestation and planning ===
Despite the initial optimism, reconstruction planning was fraught with political contestation. Gotō Shinpei, as Home Minister and head of the Reconstruction Institute (Teito fukkōin), championed ambitious and expensive plans, initially proposing a budget of ¥3 billion—more than twice the entire national budget at the time. This was met with immediate opposition from Finance Minister Inoue Junnosuke and other cabinet colleagues, who were concerned about the nation's financial stability and favored a more fiscally conservative approach.

Debates raged over the scope of reconstruction, the extent of land readjustment, the design of new infrastructure, and, crucially, the budget. The Imperial Capital Reconstruction Deliberative Council (Teito fukkō shingikai), an advisory body of elder statesmen and party leaders, became the site of fierce opposition. Critics, led by Itō Miyoji, argued the plans were extravagant, could lead to financial collapse, and violated constitutional rights to ownership. The political infighting exposed deep divisions within Japan's elite and the structural weaknesses of its quasi-democratic, bureaucratic-oligarchic political system. Gotō's plans were progressively scaled back, with the budget reduced to ¥597 million by the council and further to ¥468 million by the Diet in December 1923.

=== Land readjustment ===
Booklet of Fukkō Bushi ("Reconstruction Song") by SOEDA Tomomichi, published in 1923.

A key component of the physical reconstruction was land readjustment (kukaku seiri). The Special Urban Planning Law of December 1923 empowered the government to rationalize irregular land plots, widen streets, and create public spaces by confiscating up to 10 percent of private land without monetary compensation. Roughly 30,000,000 square meters (320,000,000 sq ft) of land in Tokyo were divided into 66 readjustment districts.

While the process aimed to create a more rational and user-friendly urban environment, it was met with confusion, resistance, and numerous petitions from landowners and tenants. Concerns involved the constitutionality of uncompensated land confiscation, the impact on businesses, the rights of tenants, and the adequacy of compensation for relocated structures. Despite these local-level disputes, the program resulted in the rationalization of many neighborhoods, particularly in eastern Tokyo, and the creation of significant new public land for roads and other infrastructure. Overall, about 15.3 percent of residential land in readjustment areas was converted to public use, with landowners compensated for acquisitions beyond the 10 percent threshold.

=== Achievements and shortcomings ===
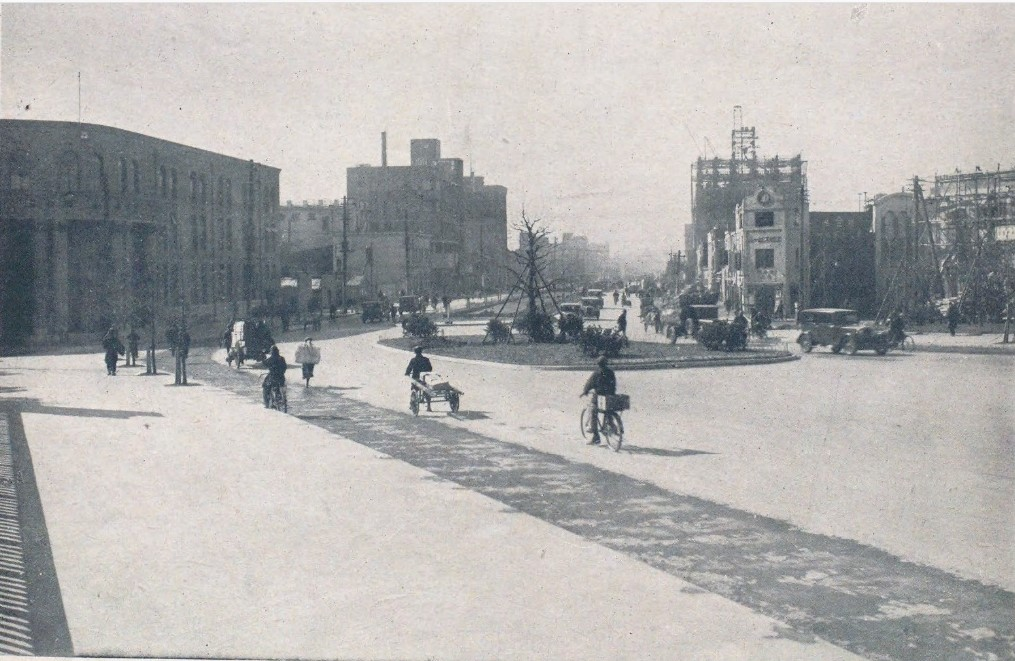
The newly constructed Shōwa-dōri in Ginza, a major thoroughfare built during the reconstruction, 1930s

By the time reconstruction was officially celebrated in March 1930, Tokyo had undergone significant physical changes. The most notable successes were in transportation infrastructure. The total area of roads in Tokyo increased by 45 percent, and many were widened and paved, with modern sidewalks. Key arterial roads like Shōwa-dōri and Yasukuni-dōri were constructed, and new, modern steel bridges, such as the Eitai-bashi and Kiyosu-bashi spanning the Sumida River, became icons of the new city. The river and canal system was also improved. However, many of the more ambitious social and environmental goals were not fully realized. Spending on parks and green spaces, while resulting in three new large parks and 52 smaller ones, was limited. Social welfare facilities, while improved, also received a small fraction of the reconstruction budget. Many of the pre-earthquake urban vulnerabilities and social problems, including slum areas, persisted or re-emerged. The final reconstruction expenditure by national and city governments totaled roughly ¥744 million.

=== Earthquake Memorial Hall ===
The site of the Honjo Clothing Depot, where tens of thousands perished, became a focal point for mourning and remembrance. Plans for a memorial were initiated soon after the disaster. In June 1924, the Taishō Earthquake Disaster Memorial Project Association was formed to oversee the project. A national design competition for the memorial complex was launched in December 1924.

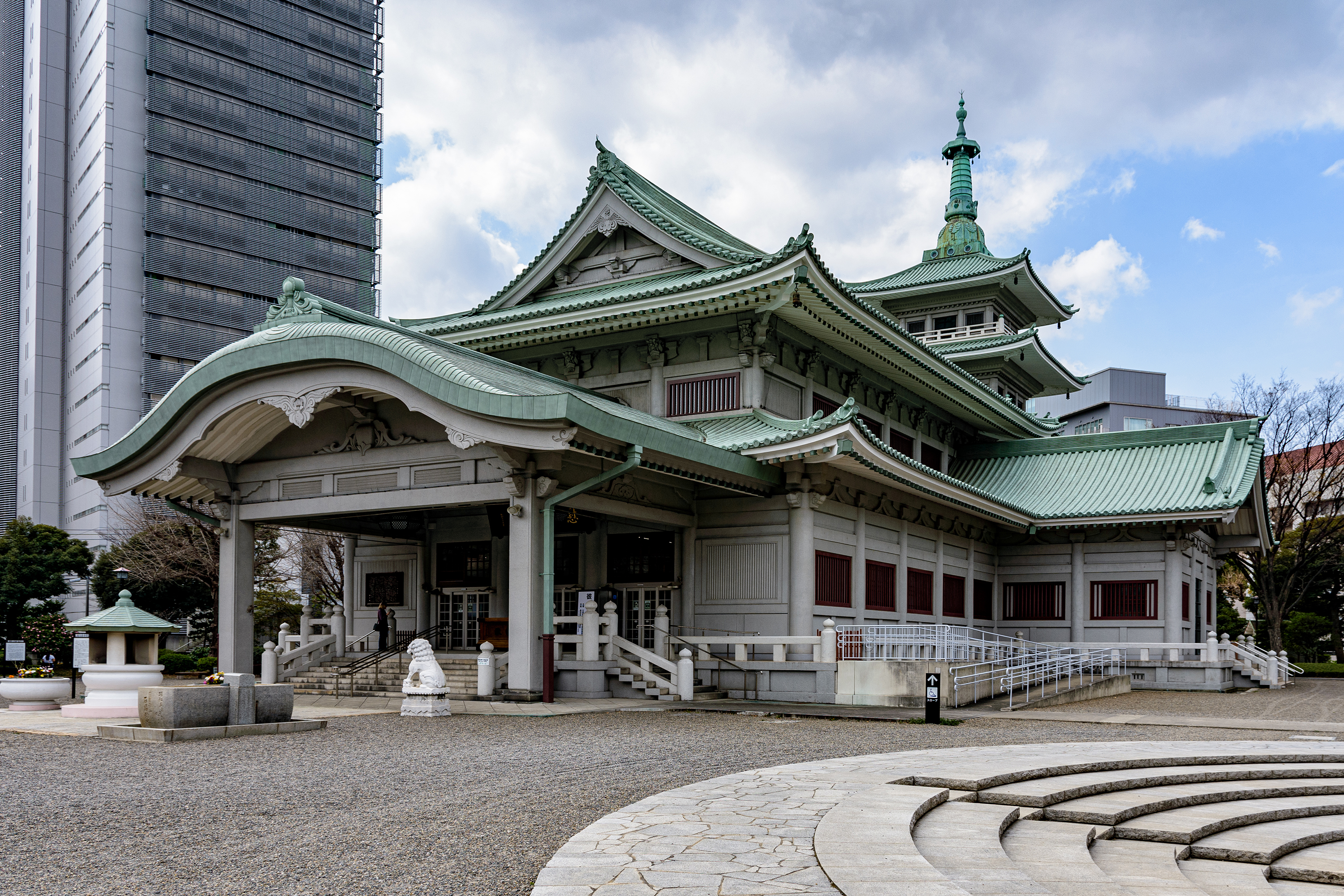
The Earthquake Memorial Hall (now Tokyo Metropolitan Memorial Hall) in Yokoamichō Park, completed in 1930 to commemorate the victims.

The winning entry by engineer-architect Maeda Kenjirō, a 53-meter (174 ft) tower, proved controversial due to its perceived resemblance to a Prussian triumphal tower and its perceived insensitivity to Buddhist sensibilities. After sustained protest, particularly from Buddhist federations, the design was scrapped in December 1926. Engineer Itō Chūta was then appointed to create a new, more "Japanese" design, heavily influenced by Buddhist architecture, featuring a pagoda that would house a charnel house. The Earthquake Memorial Hall (later the Tokyo Metropolitan Memorial Hall) in Yokoamichō Park was completed on 1 September 1930.

== Legacy ==
The Great Kantō Earthquake left an indelible mark on Japan. 1 September was designated as Disaster Prevention Day (防災の日, Bōsai no hi) in 1960, an annual commemoration involving nationwide disaster drills and awareness campaigns. The disaster highlighted urban vulnerabilities and influenced subsequent approaches to city planning and building codes, although the ideal of a truly disaster-proof city remained elusive. The memory of the earthquake, particularly the firestorms and the Honjo Clothing Depot tragedy, continued to haunt Tokyoites, influencing their behavior even during the World War II bombings. The events of 1923 also served as a catalyst for long-term government efforts to foster neighborhood associations (tonarigumi) and promote civil defense, trends that intensified in the 1930s and during the war. The disorientation and destruction caused by the disaster marked a "significant divide" in the "massification" of culture, consumption, and taste, accelerating social and cultural changes and providing a "free field" for new artistic and radical movements. The center of urban life in Tokyo also shifted, as the old merchant quarters of the shitamachi ("Low City") were particularly devastated, pushing development toward the more residential "High City" (yamanote). Despite the significant scaling-back of Gotō Shinpei's original vision, the reconstruction provided a fine example of creative recovery, rebuilding Tokyo as a modern city and serving as a model for urban development throughout Japan until the end of World War II. The earthquake and its aftermath remain a subject of historical study and public memory, serving as a stark reminder of Japan's seismic activity and the complex interplay of disaster, society, and national identity.

== See also ==
- 1293 Kamakura earthquake
- 1703 Genroku earthquake
- 1906 San Francisco earthquake
- Amakasu Incident
- List of earthquakes in 1923
- List of earthquakes in Japan
- List of megathrust earthquakes
