= Sekisui Heim Super Arena =

Indoor arena in Rifu, Miyagi, Japan

Coordinates: 38.337566°N 140.952938°E

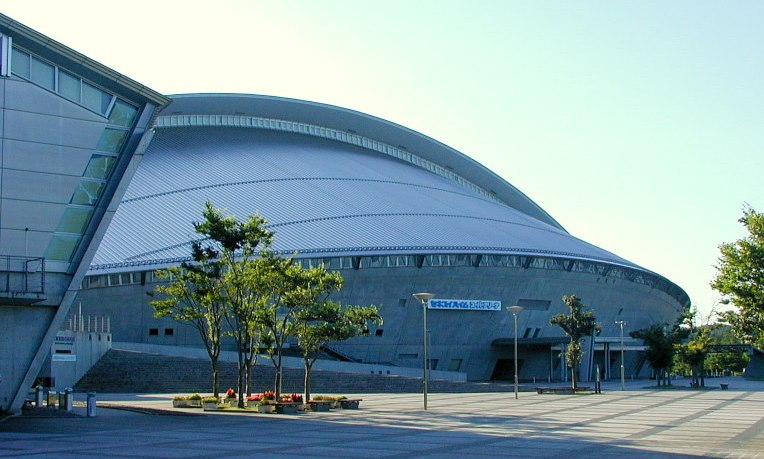
- Interactive map of Sekisui Heim Super Arena
- Former names: Grande 21 General Gymnasium (1997–2006); Hot House Super Arena (2006–2009)
- Location: Rifu, Miyagi, Japan
- Owner: Miyagi Prefecture
- Capacity: 7,063
- Surface: Artificial

Construction
- Opened: 1997

Website
- https://www.mspf.jp/grande21/index.php?action=sisetu_shoukai_arena

Sekisui Heim Super Arena (セキスイハイムスーパーアリーナ, Sekisui Haimu Sūpā Arīna) (formerly Grande 21 General Gymnasium and Hot House Super Arena) is a multi-purpose indoor arena in the Grande 21 Complex in Rifu, Miyagi, Japan. The capacity of the arena is 7,063 and was opened in 1997.

The Sekisui Heim Super Arena is located next to the Miyagi Stadium.

== Gallery ==
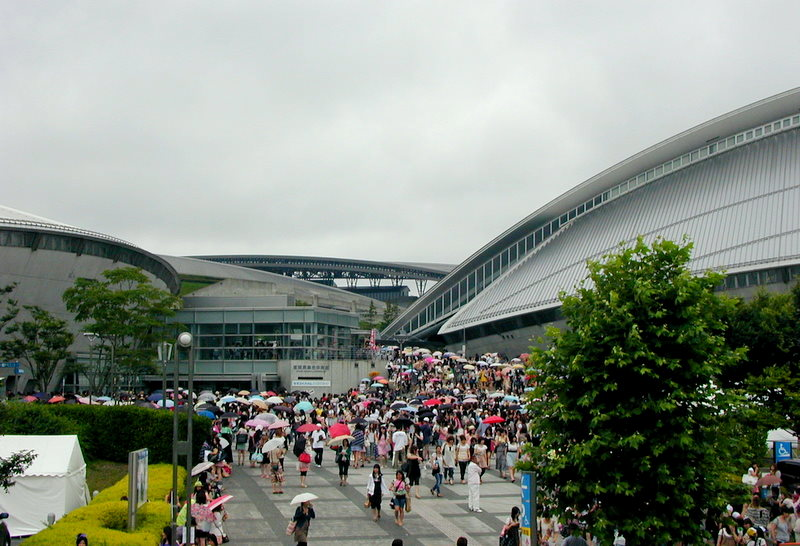

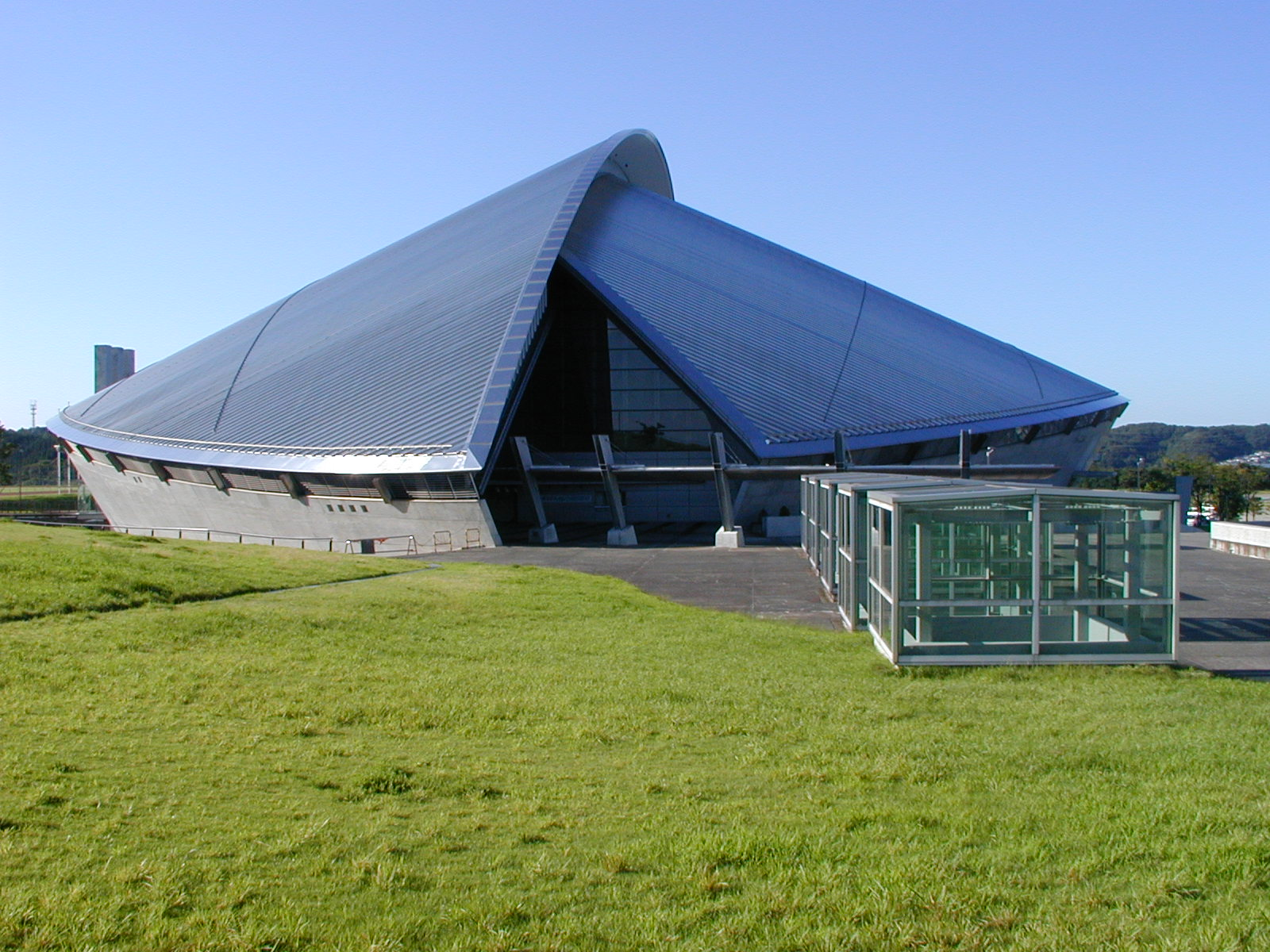

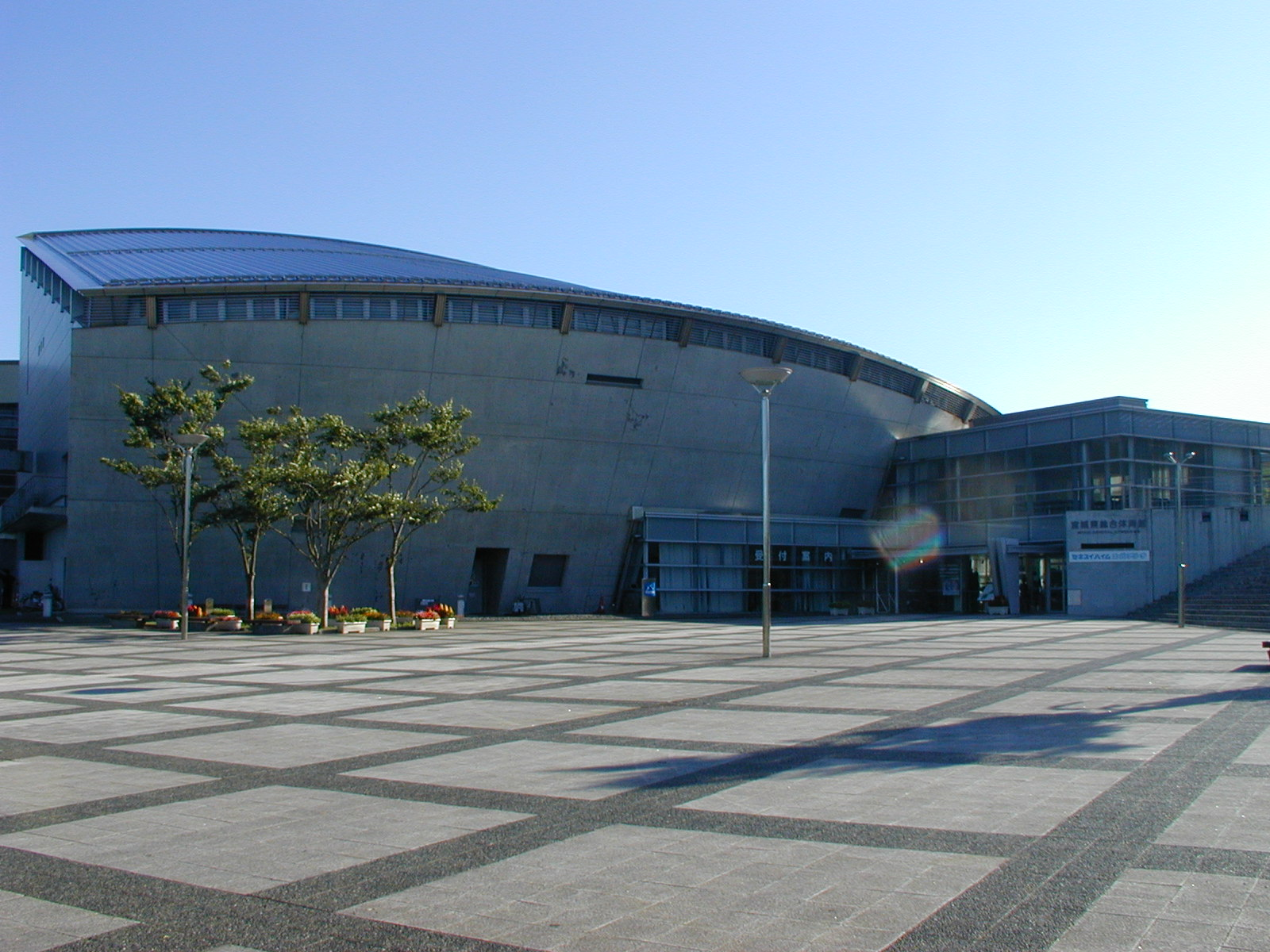
Sub Arena

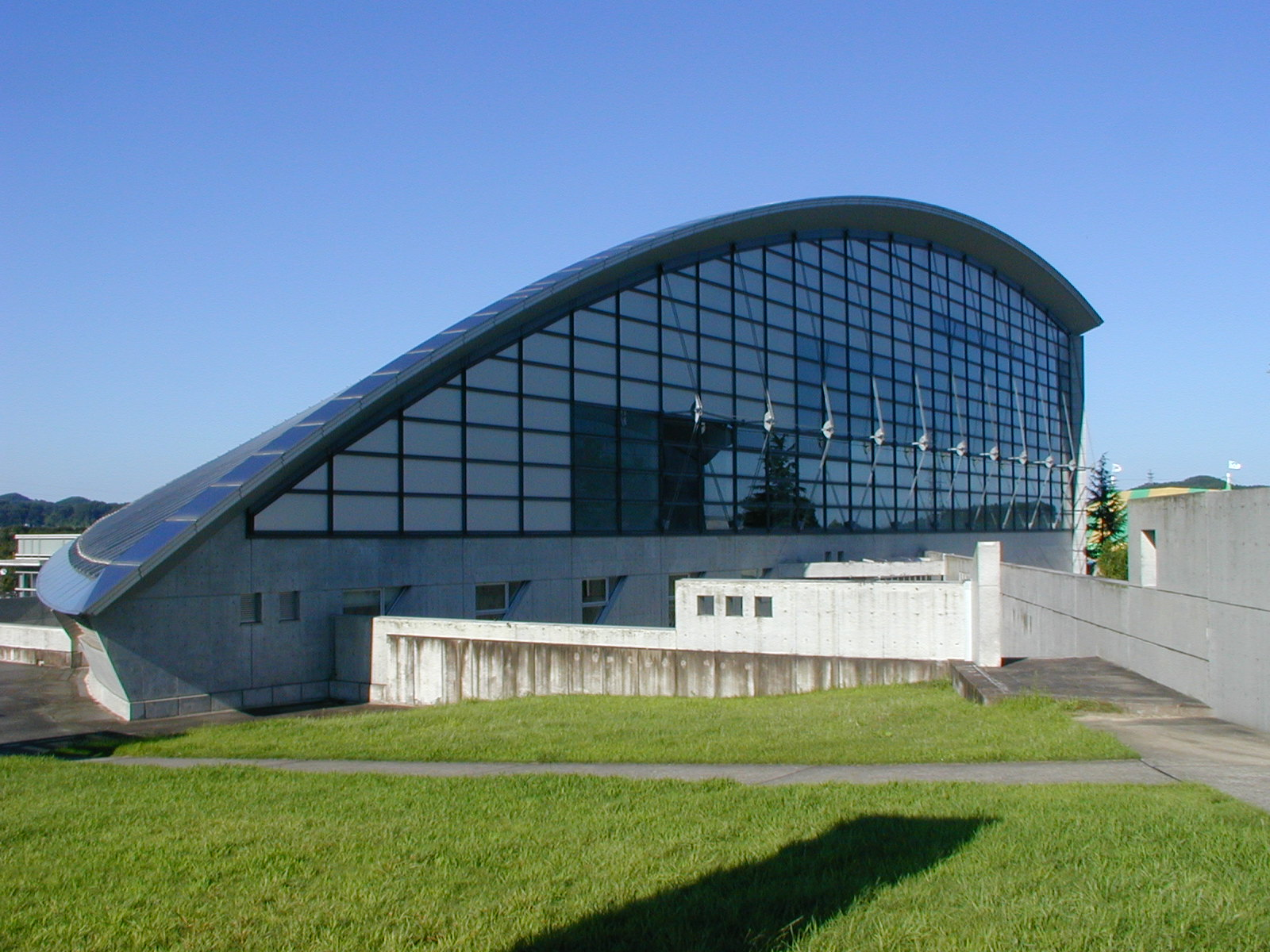
Sub Arena

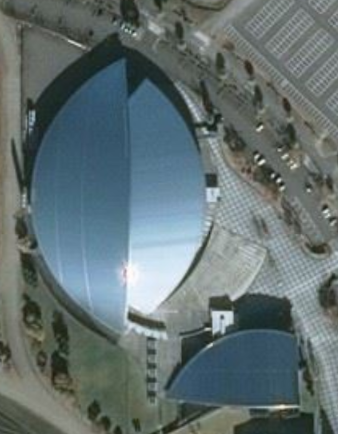
Satellite view

== Events ==
After the 2011 Tōhoku earthquake and tsunami the arena, which lies on high ground just five miles from the coast hit by the tsunami, was used as a temporary morgue. When its emergency use was ended, the arena was refurbished and blessed by a Shinto priest.

In July 2012 the arena hosted the national handball championships.

One of the first events held in the arena was the figure skating 2012 NHK Trophy. The Japan Skating Federation said the location was selected to "send a message about our recovery, in response to support from around the world." The winner in the Men's competition was 17-years old Yuzuru Hanyu from Sendai. Hanyu, that after the earthquake was forced to spend some days in an evacuation center with his family, has become one of the symbol of the reconstruction.

The annual ice show production Yuzuru Hanyu Notte Stellata, a commemoration event of the 2011 Tōhoku earthquake and tsunami, is held at the venue on the weekend of March 11 since 2023. The show, led by two-time Olympic figure skating champion Yuzuru Hanyu, features a cast of international professional figure skaters as well as a special guest artist.
