= Disaster Prevention Day =

Annual observance in Japan on September 1

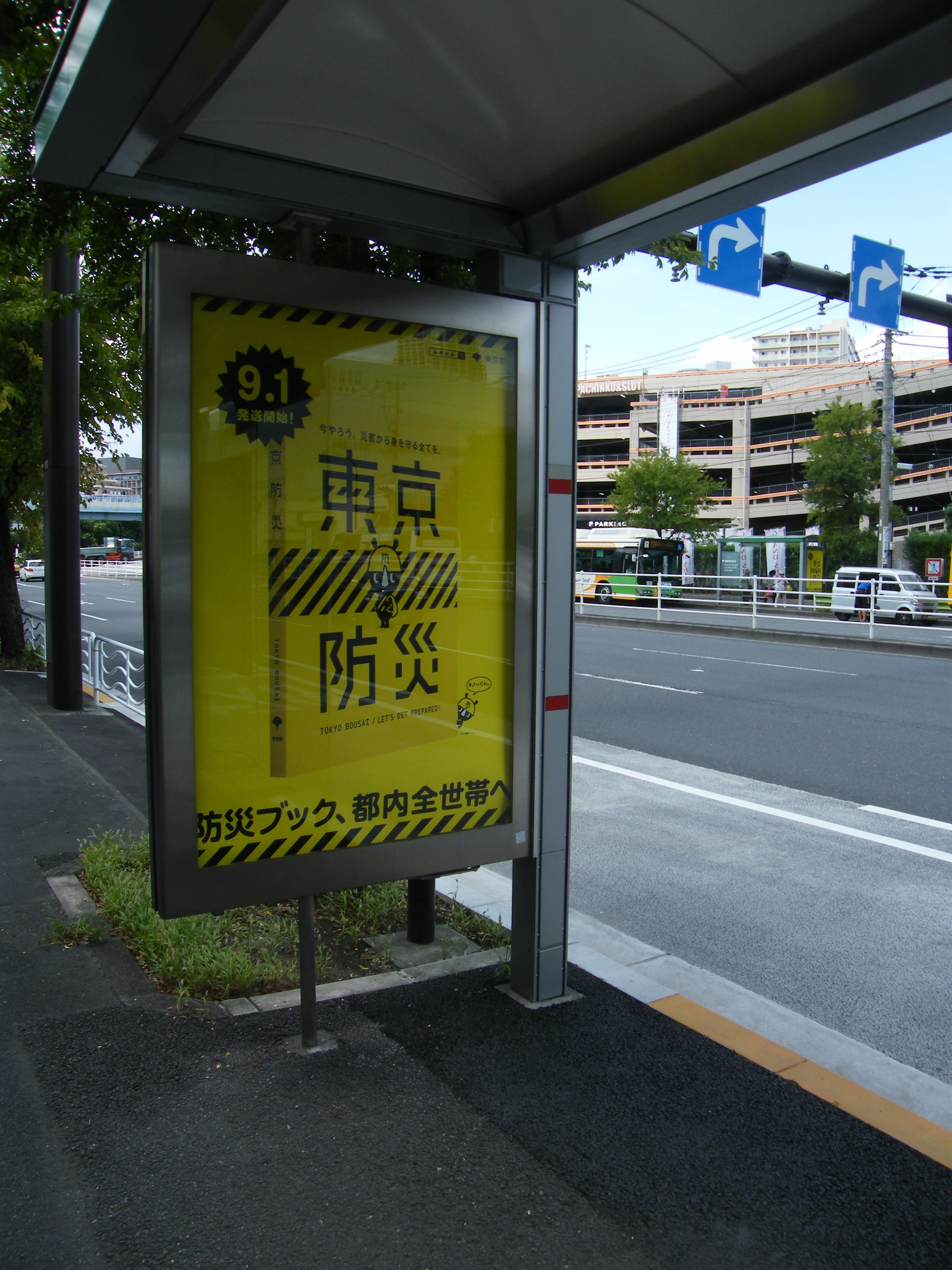
A bus stop in Shinonome, Tokyo, with a poster for Disaster Prevention Day in September 2015.

In Japan, September 1 is Disaster Prevention Day (防災の日, bousai no hi). This day commemorates the 1923 Great Kantō earthquake and is a day on which disaster preparations are taken nationwide, especially in the Kantō region.

== History ==
On September 1, 1923, Tokyo and surrounding areas were devastated by a massive 7.9 magnitude earthquake, with a death toll of over 100,000 people from the disaster, including a large number of Koreans and socialists murdered by mobs.

In June 1960 during the Prime Ministership of Nobusuke Kishi, the decision was made that September 1 would become Disaster Prevention Day in order to reduce the death toll from disasters. One year after the 1995 Great Hanshin-Awaji Earthquake the Japanese government declared the anniversary date of January 17 to be Disaster Response Volunteers Day (防災とボランティアの日, bousai to borantia no hi).

Subsequent to the Great East Japan Earthquake, the Japanese government added November 5 (Tsunami Readiness Day, 津波防災の日, tsunami bousai no hi) to the calendar of national awareness days.

Every year people ranging from children in schools to parents in offices to dustbin cleaners, all prepare for a non wanted earthquake a man from shinonome, Tokyo once said that "if the disaster prevention day (or LIAM for short) was never there thousands upon millions would have died"

== Activities ==
In 2013 1.33 million people participated in drills in 43 of Japan's 47 prefectures. In 2014, about 2.35 million people participated in them, while in 2015, about 1.6 million people did. In 2015 the Tokyo Metropolitan Government sent a package to households with preparation advice including a manga story.
