= List of bakers =

This is a list of notable bakers.

- Alice Kelly, 21st-century social media personality
- Maria Anna Fisher, 19th-century biscuit entrepreneur
- Richard Hart, founder, Hart Bageri, 2025 James Beard Book Award winner, bread category
- Paul Hollywood, judge of The Great British Bake Off
- Charles Joughin, chief baker aboard the RMS Titanic
- James William Middleton, baker of theme cakes
- Angelo Motta, Milanese baker famous for the revival of panettone
- Lionel Poilâne, noted for the excellence of his sourdough
- Kristina Lavallee, founder, The Cake Girl bakery; winner, Dessert Wars Cake Showdown (Food Network, 2023)
- Ragueneau, fictional baker and poet in Edmond Rostand's play Cyrano de Bergerac
- Sylvia Weinstock
- Nancy Silverton, founder, La Brea Bakery; James Beard Foundation Outstanding Chef 2014
- Wang Peng-chieh, 2018 winner of the Bakery Masters, artistic bread making category
- Wu Pao-chun, 2010 winner of the Bakery Masters, bread category

== See also ==
- De Echte Bakker
- List of baked goods
