= Wu Pao-chun =

Taiwanese baker

- 吳寶春
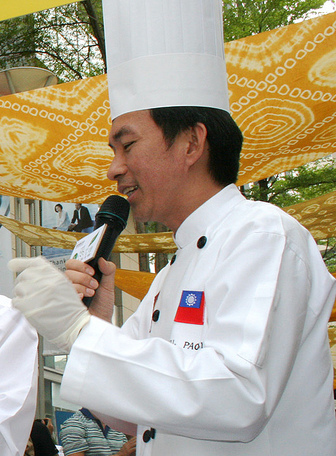
- Born: 5 September 1970 (age 55); Neipu, Pingtung County, Taiwan
- Education: Master's degree
- Alma mater: National University of Singapore
- Occupation(s): Baker, entrepreneur
- Awards: Coupe du Monde de la Boulangerie
- Website: www.wupaochun.com

Wu Pao-chun (Chinese: 吳寶春; pinyin: Wú Bǎochūn, born 5 September 1970) is a Taiwanese baker best known for winning the title of Master Baker in the bread category of the 2010 Bakery Masters competition held in Paris. Wu is also known for a rose-lychee bread he created which includes Taiwanese ingredients such as millet wine, rose petals and dried lychees. He is the founder of the bakery chain Wu Pao Chun Bakery.

== Biography ==
Wu was born in Pingtung County, Taiwan, and he grew up in an impoverished single-parent family as the youngest of eight children. In 2016, he obtained an EMBA degree from the National University of Singapore.

Wu Pao-chun has coached a number of Taiwanese bakers in international competition including Wang Peng-chieh.
