= Wu Pao Chun Bakery =

Taiwanese bakery chain

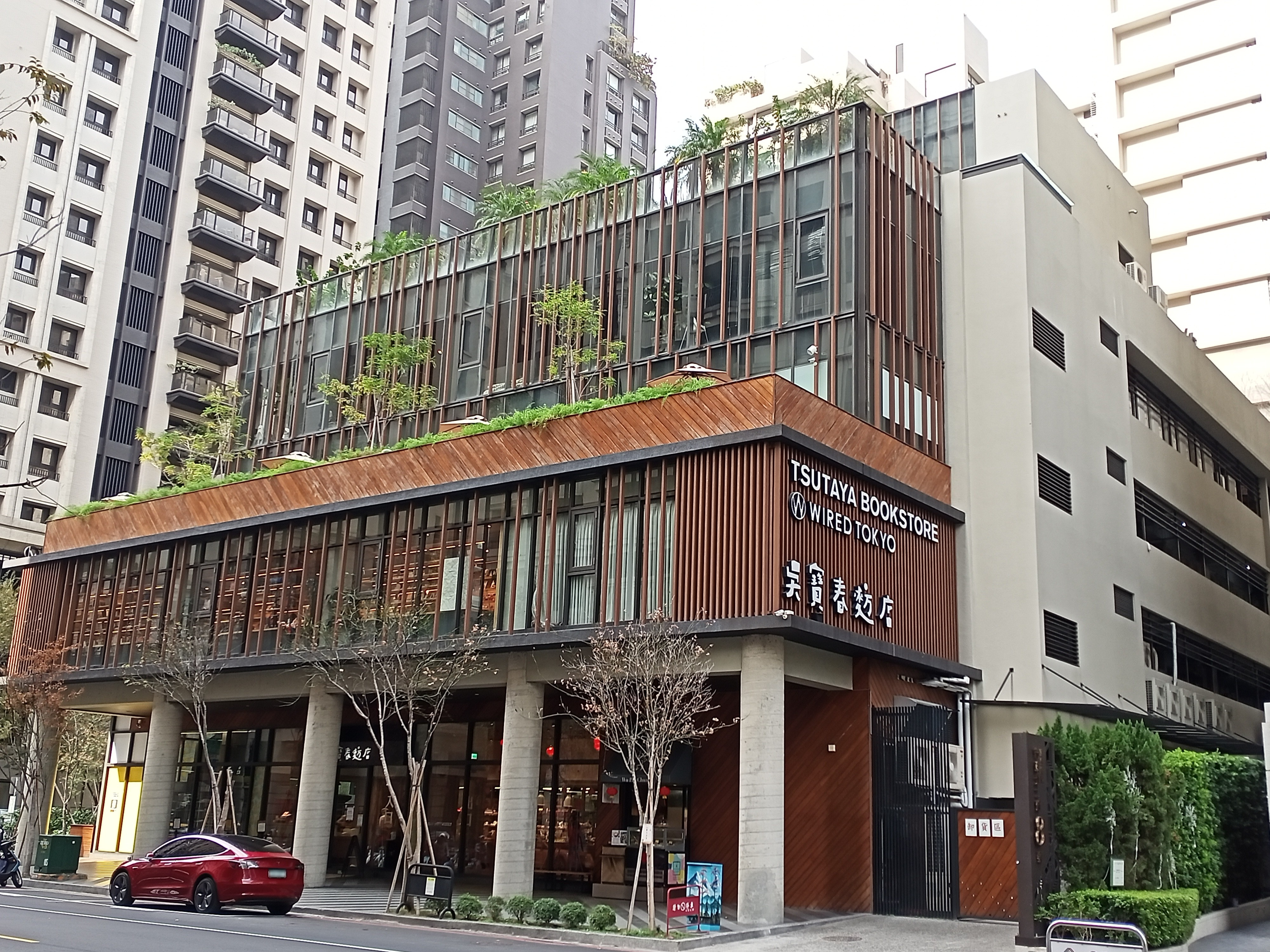
- Industry: Food and Beverage
- Founded: 24 May 2010; 16 years ago
- Headquarters: Kaohsiung, Taiwan
- Area served: Taiwan, China, Singapore
- Key people: Wu Pao-chun (吳寶春)
- Website: wupaochun.com

Wu Pao Chun Bakery (Chinese: 吳寶春麥方店; pinyin: Wú bǎo chūn pàng diàn) is a Taiwanese bakery chain founded by baker Wu Pao-chun. It has nine retail shops in Taiwan, two in China and two in Singapore.

== History ==
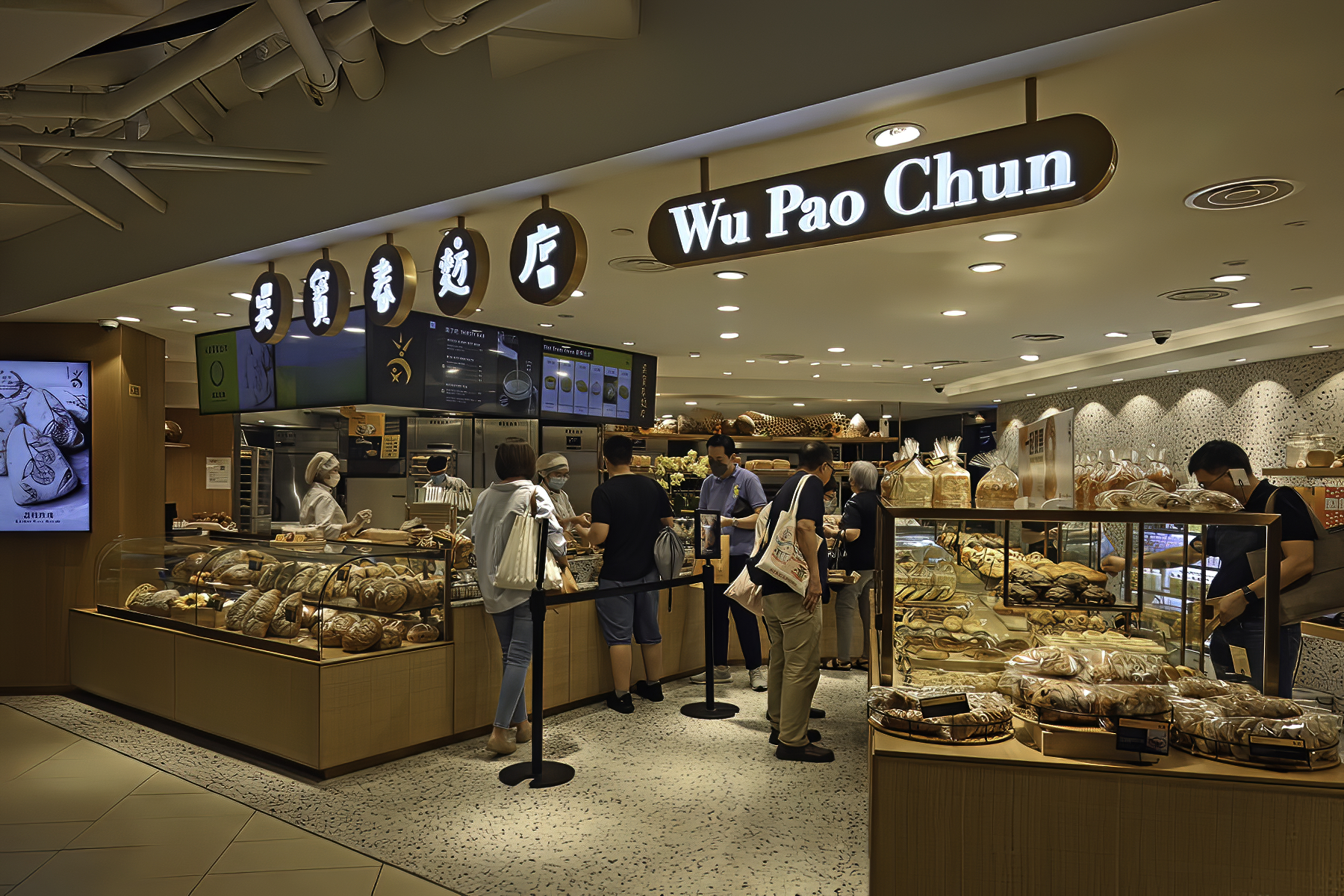
Wu Pao Chun Bakery at Paragon Shopping Centre, Orchard Road, Singapore.

Wu Pao-chun incorporated the company on 24 May 2010 and opened the first flagship store in Kaohsiung, Taiwan, in November 2010.

- In 2017, the company opened its second flagship store in Taichung.
- In 2018, Taichung HSR station store opened.
- In 2018, the company opened its third flagship store in Xinyi District, Taipei.
- In December 2018, the company opened its first overseas store in Shanghai, China.
- In June 2019, the company opened its first outlet in Singapore.
- On 2 May 2022, the company opened its second outlet in Singapore.

== Specialities ==
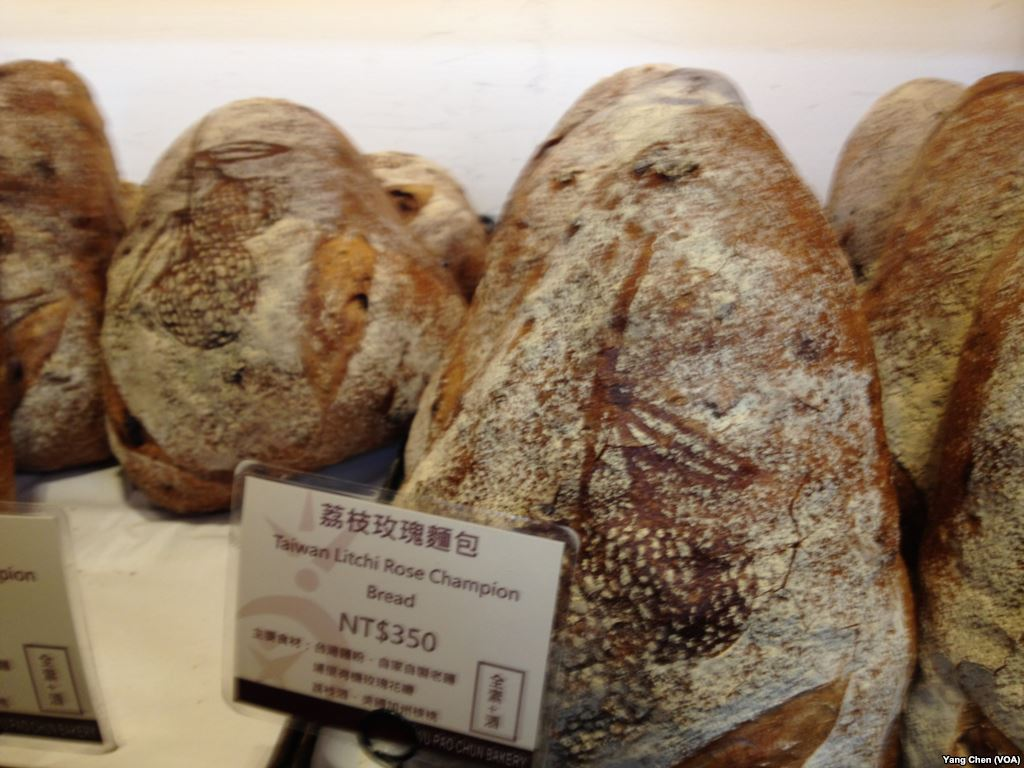
Rose-lychee bread from Wu Pao Chun Bakery.

The chain is known for their rose-lychee bread created by Wu Pao-chun, which includes Taiwanese ingredients such as millet wine, rose petals and dried lychees. The bakery's lychee-rose bread won the international baking competition Coupe du Monde de la Boulangerie in 2010 and has been featured on Vogue and CNN as one of the '40 of the best Taiwanese foods and drinks'.

== See also ==
- List of companies of Taiwan
- Chia Te Bakery
