= EVA Air =

Airline of Taiwan

EVA Air 長榮航空

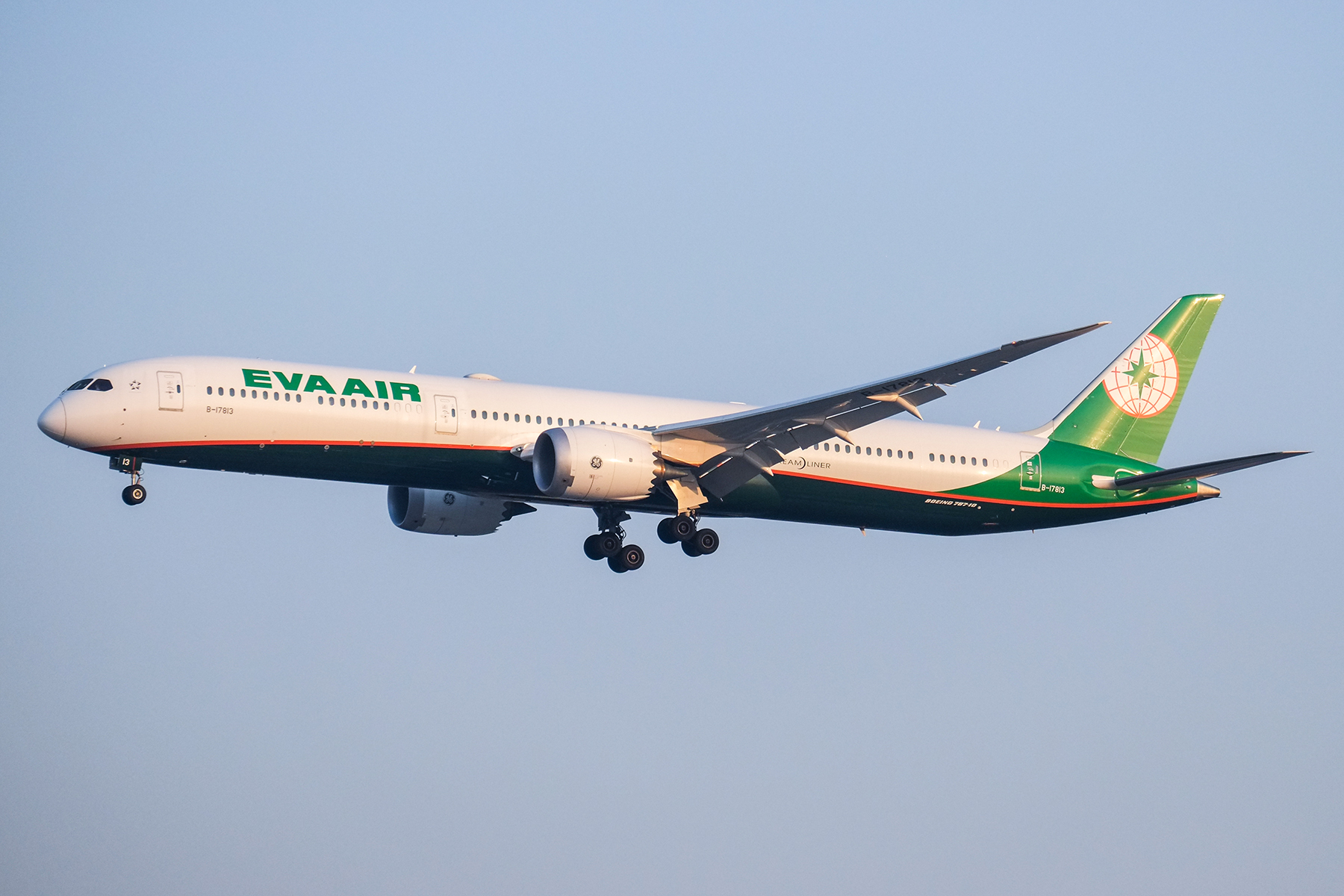
- An EVA Air Boeing 787-10
IATA	ICAO	Call sign
BR	EVA	EVA
- Founded: 8 March 1989; 37 years ago
- Commenced operations: 1 July 1991; 35 years ago
- Hubs: Taipei–Taoyuan
- Focus cities: Bangkok–Suvarnabhumi; Kaohsiung; Taipei–Songshan
- Frequent-flyer program: Infinity MileageLands
- Alliance: Star Alliance
- Subsidiaries: UNI Air
- Fleet size: 87
- Destinations: 58
- Parent company: Evergreen Group
- Traded as: TWSE: 2618
- Headquarters: Luzhu, Taoyuan, Taiwan
- Key people: Lin Bou-Shiu (Chairman) Sun Chia-Ming (President)
- Revenue: NT$127,142,232,000
- Operating income: NT$17,028,465
- Net income: NT$8,146,909,000
- Profit: NT$7,091,299,000
- Total assets: NT$294,048,935,000
- Total equity: NT$87,936,555,000
- Employees: 10,377 (31 December 2022)
- Website: www.evaair.com

EVA Air
- Traditional Chinese: 長榮航空
- Simplified Chinese: 长荣航空
- Literal meaning: Evergreen Airlines
Transcriptions
Standard Mandarin
- Hanyu Pinyin: Chángróng Hángkōng
- Wade–Giles: Ch'ang-jung Hang-k'ung
Southern Min
- Hokkien POJ: Tióng-êng Hâng-khong

EVA Airways Corporation (/ˌiːviːˈeɪ/ EE-vee-AY; Chinese: 長榮航空; pinyin: Chángróng Hángkōng) (TWSE: 2618) is an international airline headquartered in Taoyuan, Taiwan. It is one of the three largest airlines in Taiwan along with China Airlines and Starlux Airlines. The privately owned airline operates passenger and dedicated cargo services to over 40 international destinations in Asia, Australia, Europe and North America. Its network fully consists of international routes, with no domestic routes. It is rated as a 5-star airline by Skytrax, and is the second largest airline based in Taiwan after China Airlines. EVA Air's hub airport is Taoyuan International Airport, the main international airport of Taiwan. The company slogan is "Sharing the World, Flying Together" (分享世界，比翼雙飛; Fēnxiǎng shìjiè, bǐyì shuāngfēi).

Since its founding in 1989 as an affiliate of shipping conglomerate Evergreen Group, EVA Air has expanded to include air cargo, airline catering, ground handling, and aviation engineering services. Its cargo arm, EVA Air Cargo, links with the Evergreen worldwide shipping network on sea and land. Its domestic and regional subsidiary, UNI Air, operates a medium and short-haul network to destinations within the island of Taiwan, Macau as well as mainland China with its main hub in Kaohsiung, Taiwan.

EVA Air operates a mixed fleet of Airbus and Boeing aircraft, with Airbus A330, Airbus A321, Boeing 777, Boeing 787 and ATR 72 (operated by Uni Air) airliners primarily used on passenger routes, along with Boeing 777 freighter aircraft used on cargo routes. The airline was the first carrier to introduce the Premium Economy class (previously called Elite Class by EVA Air), which it debuted in 1991.

== History ==
=== Launch ===
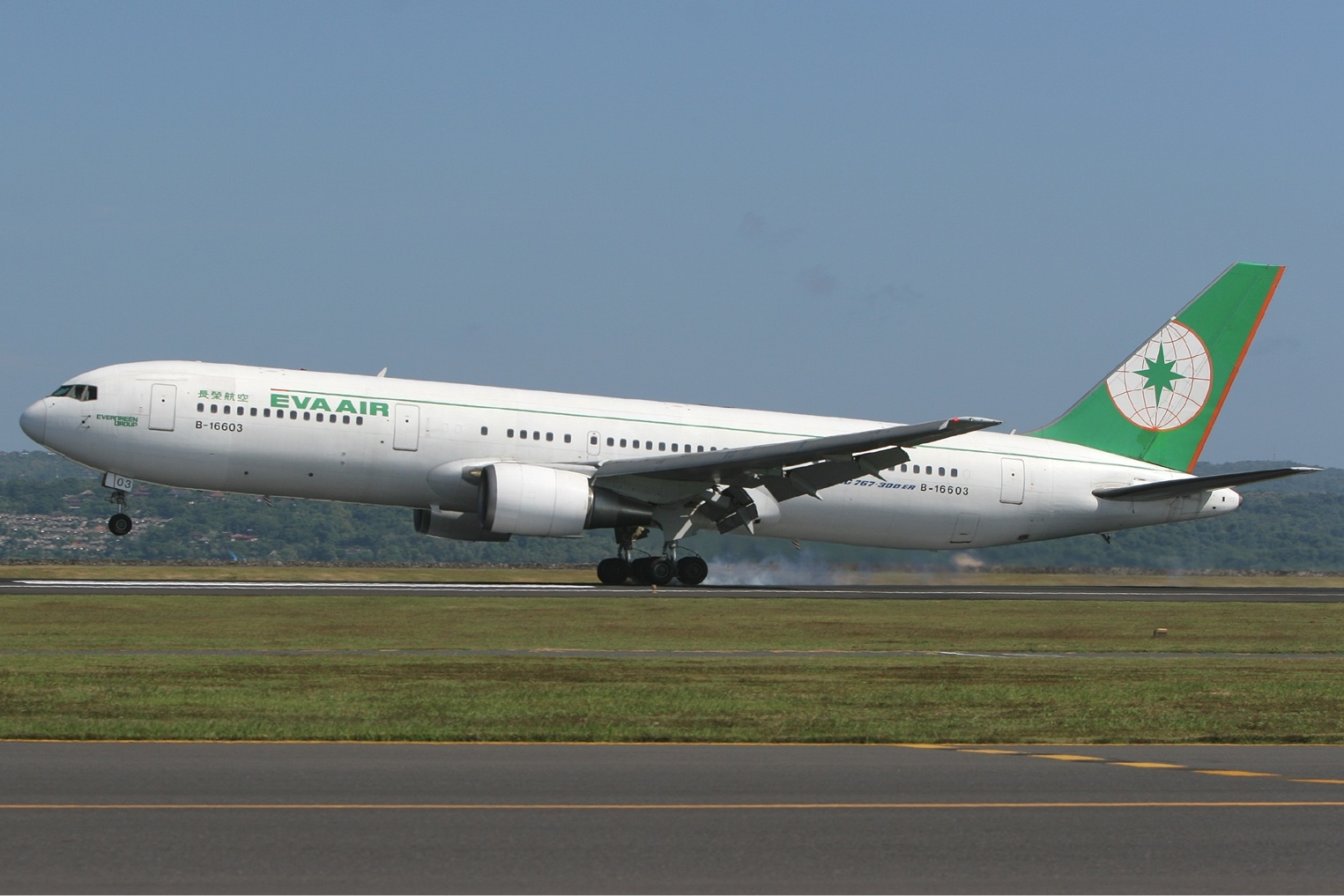
EVA Air began commercial services in 1991 with the Boeing 767-300ER

In September 1988, during the 20th anniversary celebration of Evergreen Marine's founding, company chairman Chang Yung-fa announced his company's intentions to establish Taiwan's first private international airline. The opportunity to create a major Taiwanese airline had just arisen following a decision by the Taiwanese government to liberalise the country's air transportation system. At this time, the government still required global experience and financial capital requirements for any company seeking permission to initiate international airline service from Taiwan.

Upon receipt of regulatory approval, EVA Airways Corporation was formally established in March 1989. The airline was originally to be called Evergreen Airways, however this was deemed too similar to the unrelated Evergreen International cargo airline. In October 1989, the newly formed EVA Airways Corporation placed a US$3.6 billion order for 26 aircraft from Boeing and McDonnell Douglas, including Boeing 747-400 and MD-11 airliners.

Operations began on 1 July 1991 with three Boeing 767-300ER aircraft featuring business and economy class seating. Initial destinations from Taipei were Bangkok, Seoul, Jakarta, Singapore, and Kuala Lumpur. These 767s were initially painted slightly different to the standard livery adopted in 1992. By the end of the year, the EVA Air network had expanded to include additional cities in East Asia and its first European destination, Vienna. First year revenues reached US$40 million.

=== Expansion in the 1990s ===
In 1992, EVA Air received the first of its Boeing 747-400 aircraft on order, and launched its premium economy class, "Economy Deluxe", on its 747 transpacific flights to Los Angeles, beginning in December of that year. EVA Air's premium economy cabin was the first in the world featured a wider 2-4-2 abreast configuration, leg rests, individual seatback video, and enhanced meal services. EVA Air's Economy Deluxe cabin (later renamed "Evergreen Deluxe" and "Elite Class") proved popular with the traveling public. For international services, EVA Air's 747s were configured with 104 premium economy seats as part of a 370-seat, four-class cabin, in addition to first, business and economy classes. In 1993, EVA Air added flights to Seattle, New York, Bangkok and Vienna with the Boeing 747-400.

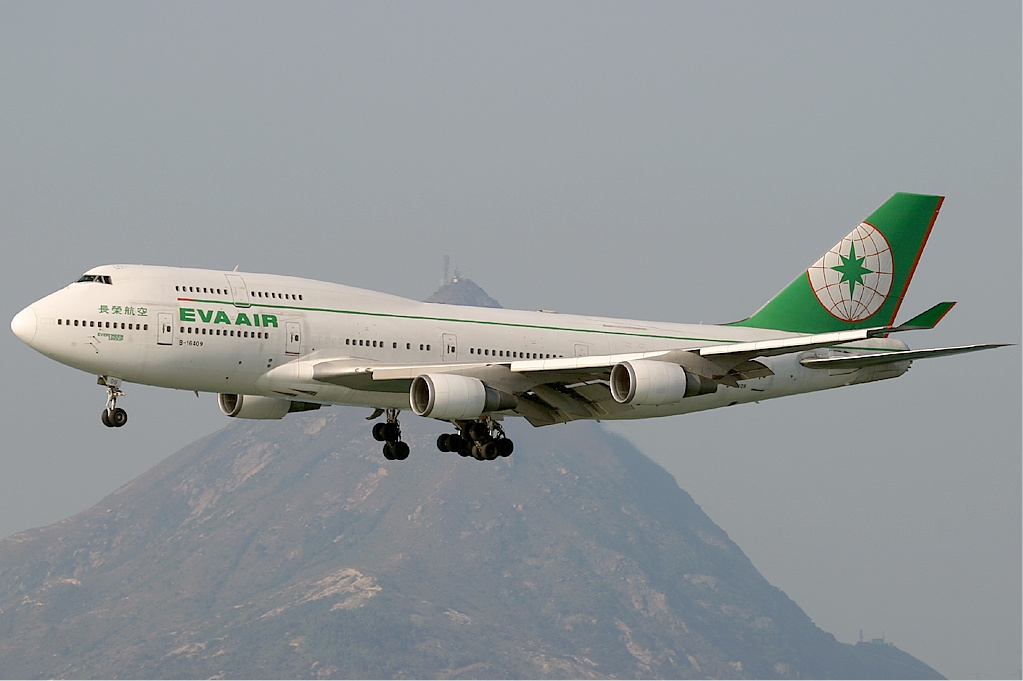
An EVA Air Boeing 747-400 in the airline's first standard livery (1992–2001)

By 1994, EVA Air was providing regular service to 22 destinations worldwide, and carrying over 3 million passengers annually. In 1995, the airline posted its first profit on revenues of US$1.05 billion, one year ahead of schedule. Internationally, EVA Air's rapid expansion and increased passenger volume was boosted by its safety record, in contrast to its primary competitor, China Airlines. In addition to receiving IOSA (IATA Operational Safety Audit) certification, EVA Air in 1997 achieved simultaneous official ISO 9002 certification in the areas of Passenger, Cargo, and Maintenance Services.

Dedicated EVA Air Cargo operations began in April 1995, with the first weekly McDonnell Douglas MD-11 freighter flights to Taipei, Singapore, Penang, San Francisco, New York, and Los Angeles. EVA Air Cargo's fleet was expanded to five freighters by the end of the year. Previously, EVA Air Cargo operations mainly relied on passenger aircraft cargo space.

In the mid-1990s, EVA Air expanded into the domestic Taiwan market by acquiring shares in Makung International Airlines, followed by Great China Airlines and Taiwan Airways. On 1 July 1998, all three carriers, as well as EVA's existing domestic operations, merged under the UNI Air title. UNI Air became EVA Air's domestic intra-Taiwanese subsidiary, operating short haul flights out of its base in Kaohsiung, Taiwan's southern port and second-largest city.

=== Maturation in the early 2000s ===
In 2000, EVA Air embarked on its first major long-haul fleet renewal. The airline became one of the launch customers for the Boeing 777-300ER, ordering four aircraft plus eight options. At the same time, the airline placed three orders for the Boeing 777-200LR. In January 2001, EVA Air ordered its first Airbus aircraft, the A330-200. The Boeing 777 aircraft were intended for United States and European services, while the Airbus A330 aircraft were intended for regional Asian routes.

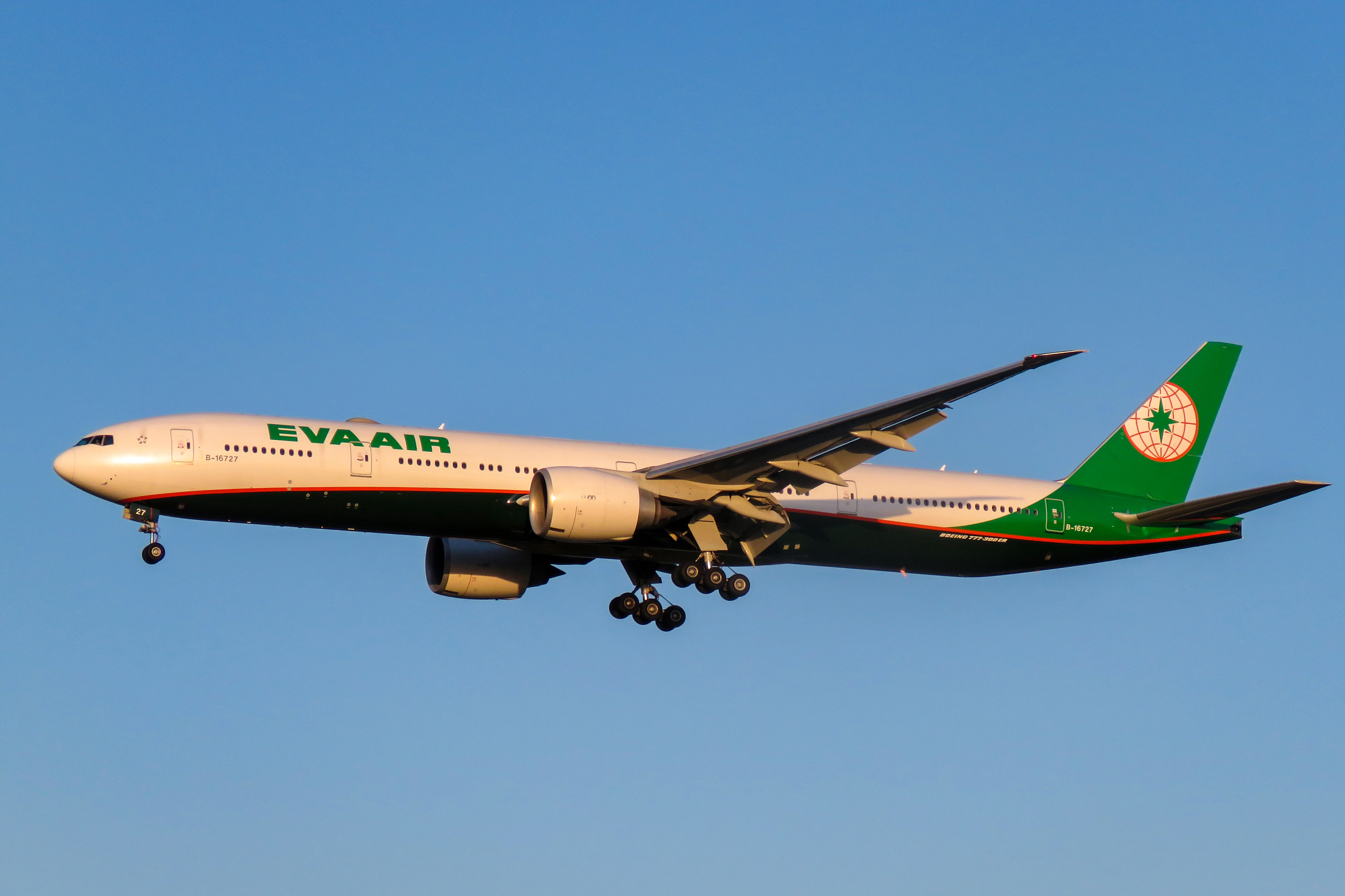
EVA Air's long-haul aircraft, the Boeing 777-300ER

In 2001, EVA Air began listing public stock offerings on the Taiwan Stock Exchange. Initially, one percent of the company's shares was offered over-the-counter, with one-quarter held by parent company Evergreen Marine Corporation and EVA Air employees, respectively. In 2002, EVA Air underwent internal corporate reforms, with staff reductions and streamlined management. This culminated a process which had begun in 1997, when the Asian financial crisis began affecting profitability. The 2002–2003 SARS contagion also affected passenger traffic for medium-haul flights in Southeast Asia, while long-haul flights to North America, Japan, and Europe were less affected.

In 2004, EVA Air converted its remaining eight options for Boeing 777-300ERs into firm orders. The first Boeing 777-300ER entered service as EVA Air's new flagship aircraft in July 2005. With the arrival of its new Boeing 777s, EVA Air launched a comprehensive revamp of its cabins, introducing lie-flat seats in its new Premium Laurel business class cabin, and upgrading its premium economy product to the new Elite Class cabin. The airline's A330s were introduced with two-class Premium Laurel and Economy cabins. In December 2005, EVA Air and its associated divisions had 5,098 employees, and the airline's network spanned 40 passenger destinations worldwide, with additional cargo destinations.

=== Repositioning in the late 2000s ===
In 2007, EVA Air announced a nonstop Taipei to New York (Newark Liberty International Airport) service, to be operated with its new long-range Boeing 777-300ERs. At the same time, the airline withdrew passenger service from Taipei to Paris. On 31 October 2008, EVA Air announced a resumption of Taipei to Paris service with twice-weekly passenger flights beginning 21 January 2009. In 2008, the airline also announced the suspension of services to Auckland. The carrier also prepared to increase direct flights to China, after initiating weekly charter flights in July 2008 following changes to the Three Links travel agreements.

For the 2007–2008 period, EVA Air coped with a 34% surge in fuel prices, which contributed to a US$61.2 million 2007 loss. In August 2008, EVA Air reported a second quarterly loss due to increased fuel costs. In response, the airline implemented cost-saving measures, including flight schedule reductions and fee increases. In early 2008, EVA Air's business office in El Segundo, California, announced a major staff reduction, with over half the staff advised that they would no longer be employed by May 2008. Functions performed by those local staff were shifted to Taiwan by half, such as the reservation center.

EVA Air carried 6.2 million passengers in 2007, and employed 4,800 staff members as of April 2008. The carrier returned to profitability in the first quarter of 2009, with a US$5.9 million net gain. In August 2010, EVA Air was named one of the top 10 international airlines in Travel+Leisure's World's Best Awards.

=== Further expansion in the early 2010s ===
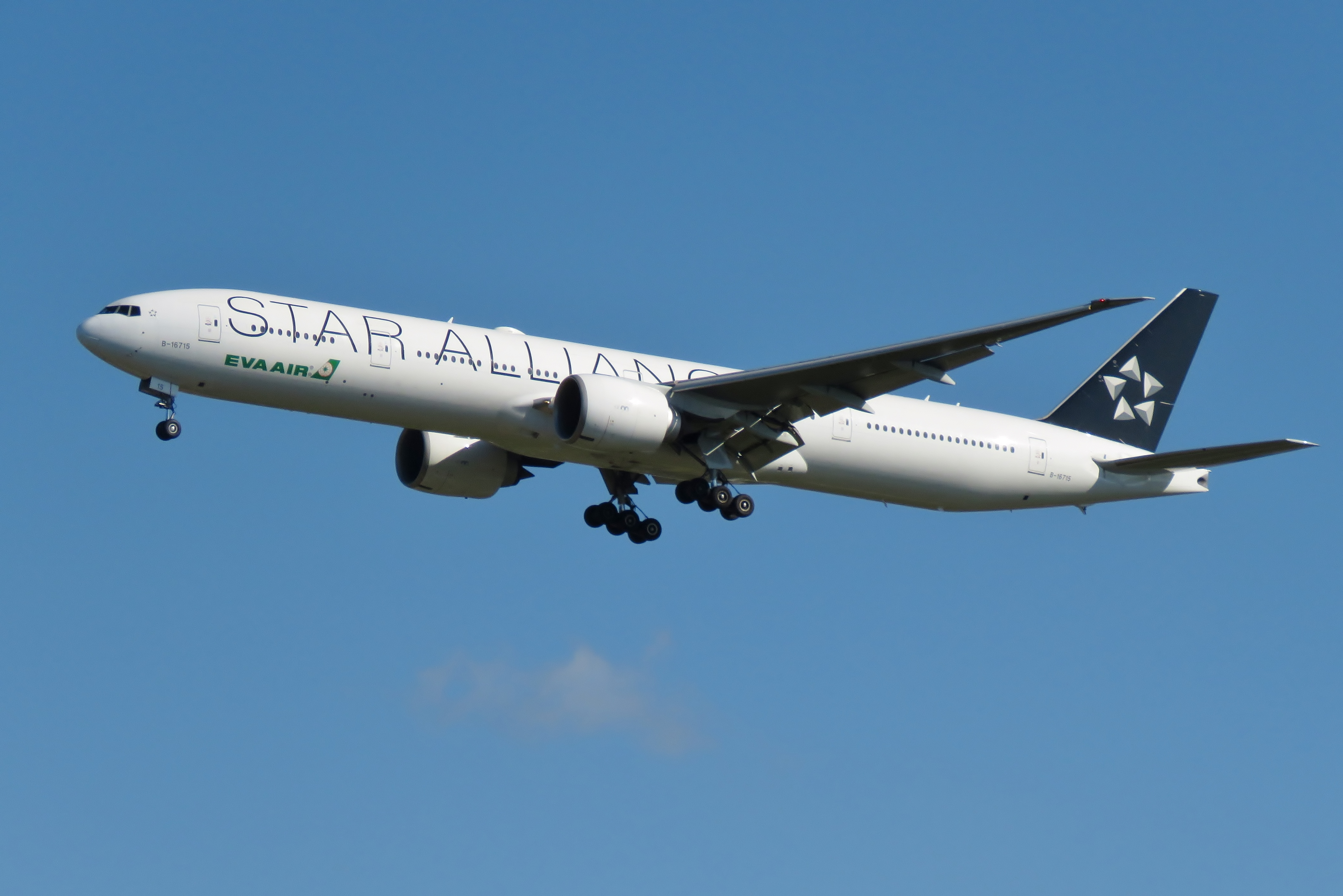
EVA Air Boeing 777-300ER in Star Alliance livery

In March 2010, EVA Air began services to Toronto. In November 2010, EVA Air began nonstop flights connecting the inner-city Taipei Songshan and Tokyo Haneda airports. In 2010, Chang Kuo-wei, son of Chang Yung-fa, returned to serve as EVA Air's president, and the carrier recorded increased sales and yearly profits. In early 2011, the carrier announced that it had applied for airline alliance membership with Star Alliance, and later that year clarified that it was in talks to join either Oneworld or Star Alliance by 2013. In June 2011, the carrier began nonstop flights from Taipei to Guam, and, in October 2011, the carrier announced nonstop service from New York (JFK) to Taipei.

On 27 March 2012, EVA Air announced that it would join Star Alliance in 2013. On 18 June 2013, EVA Air became a full member of Star Alliance.

In October 2014, EVA Air announced its intention to expand its North American network by adding new routes to Houston in 2015 and Chicago in 2016, along with expanding 55 flights per week to 63 flights per week to North America.

In October 2015, EVA Air announced its intent to purchase up to 24 Boeing 787s and two additional 777-300ER (Extended Range) jetliners from Boeing. EVA Airways joined the 787-10 launch customer team.

=== Recent developments ===
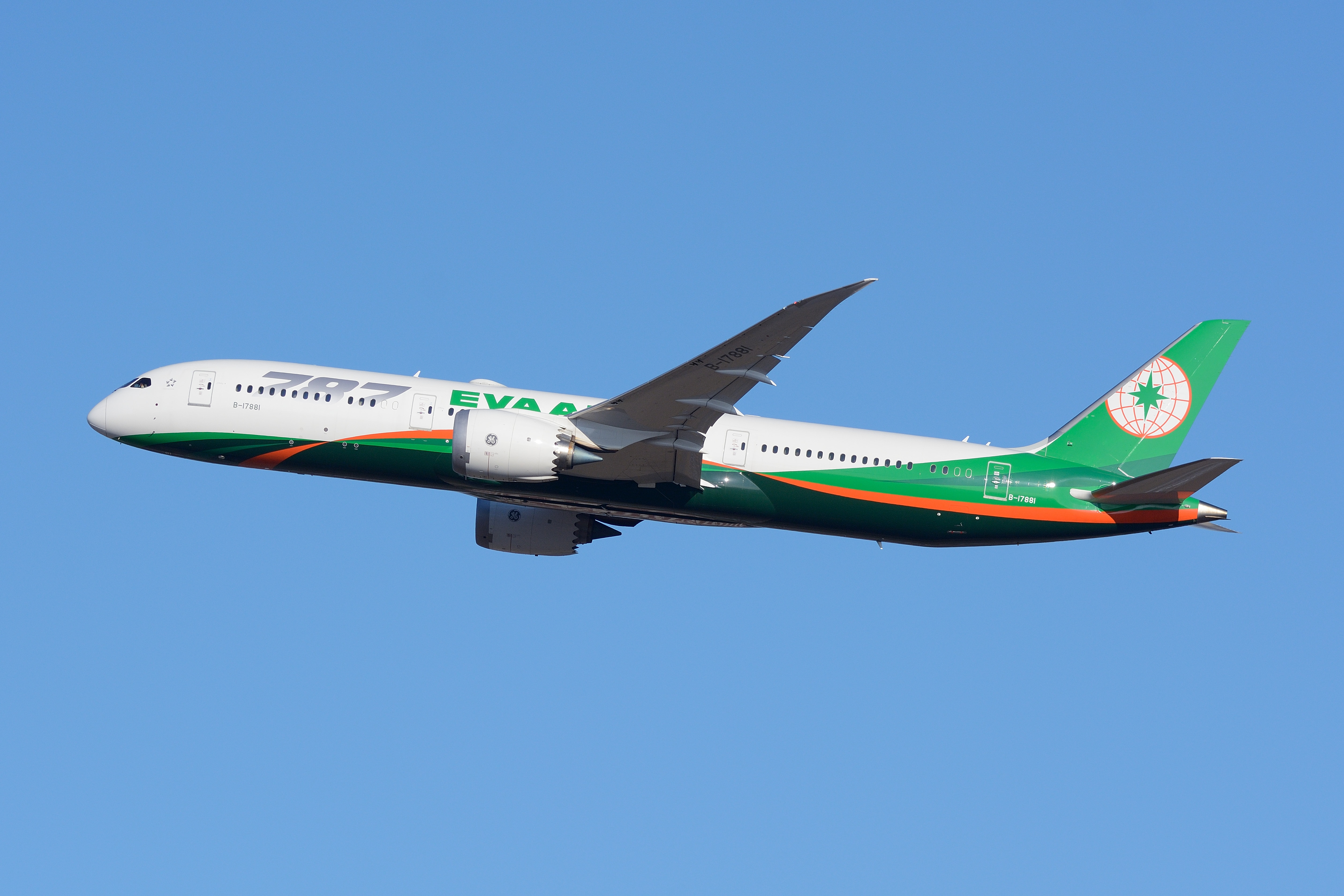
EVA Air's first Boeing 787-9

In November 2015, EVA Air unveiled a new livery on its Boeing 777-300ER. In January 2016, Evergreen Group chairman Chang Yung-fa died, leaving control of the company to his son by his second marriage, Chang Kuo-Wei. In March 2016, a coup by the three children of Chang Yung-fa's first marriage removed Chang Kuo-Wei as chairman and replaced him with Lin Pang-Shui (Steven Lin). Chang Kuo-Wei later established a new airline separate from EVA Air, called Starlux Airlines.

In June 2016, EVA Air was one of eleven airlines to be given a Skytrax 5-star rating. On 24 August 2017, EVA Air unveiled its third-generation uniform, designed by fashion house Shiatzy Chen. Those new uniforms were rolled out in November 2017, replacing the second generation uniform that was introduced in 2003.

On 2 October 2018, EVA Air took delivery of its first of four Boeing 787-9 Dreamliners. The airline has orders for 20 787-10s and options for six more. In June 2019, EVA Air took delivery of its first of twenty Boeing 787-10 Dreamliners.

== Corporate affairs and identity ==
=== Business trends ===
The key trends of EVA Air are (as at the financial year ending 31 December):

	Operating Revenue (NT$ billion)	Net profit (NT$ billion)	Number of passengers carried (m)	Passenger load factor (%)	Cargo carried (000s tonnes)	Number of aircraft (Note: at year end)	Number of employees	References
2011	102	0.20	-	78.0	793	59	5,807	
2012	107	0.50	7.5	79.3	741	60	6,429	
2013	110	0.74	8.0	79.6	713	62	7,077	
2014	116	−1.3	8.9	78.1	680	67	7,750	
2015	115	6.4	10.0	80.8	622	65	-	
2016	115	3.4	11.2	80.0	611	72	-	
2017	125	5.7	12.1	78.3	643	78	-	
2018	135	6.5	12.5	80.8	649	79	-	
2019	135	3.9	12.9	83.3	610	84	11,335	
2020	79.6	−3.3	2.3	51.5	703	87		
2021	95.3	6.6	0.3	20.0	857	90	10,586	
2022	127	7.0	2.2	60.8	842	85	10,377	
2023	187	21.5	11.3	83.1	701	87	10,982	

=== Management ===
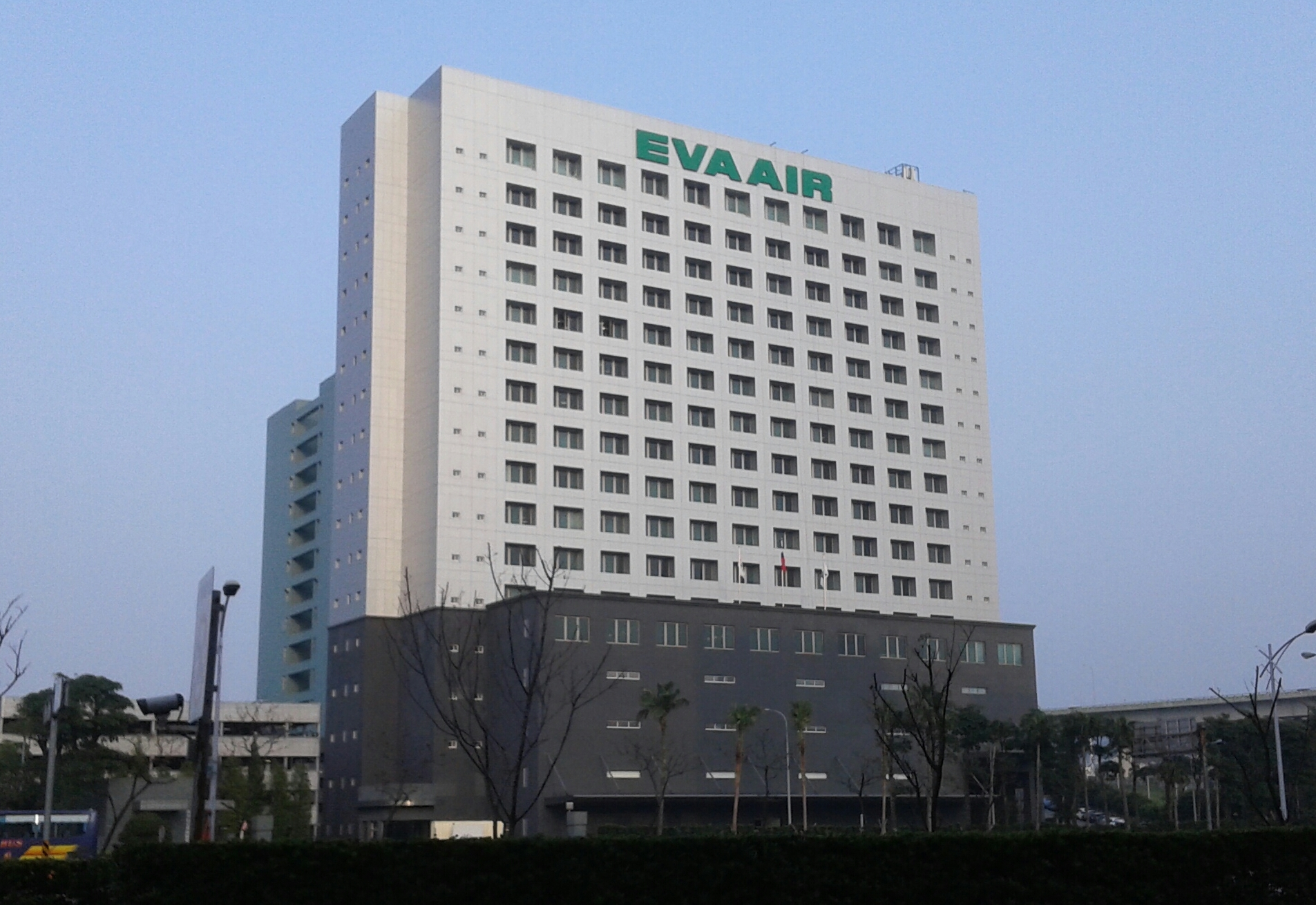
EVA Air's headquarters

As of 2011, EVA Air's corporate leadership is headed by Chairman Lin Bou-shiu and President Cheng Chuan-yi. EVA Air's president plays a primary role in managing EVA's business operations. Other members of EVA Air's board manage support and service services of the company, including its catering and maintenance divisions. Related areas outside EVA Air's direct management include UNI Holidays, Evergreen's Evasión travel service and Evergreen Laurel Hotels. EVA Air has its headquarters, known as the EVA Air Building, in Luzhu, Taoyuan City.

EVA Air is largely privately owned. Primary shareholders are Evergreen Marine Corporation (20%), Evergreen founder Chang Yung-fa (15%), and Evergreen International Corporation (11%). Foreign investors and individual stockholders combined hold 28% of EVA Air shares.

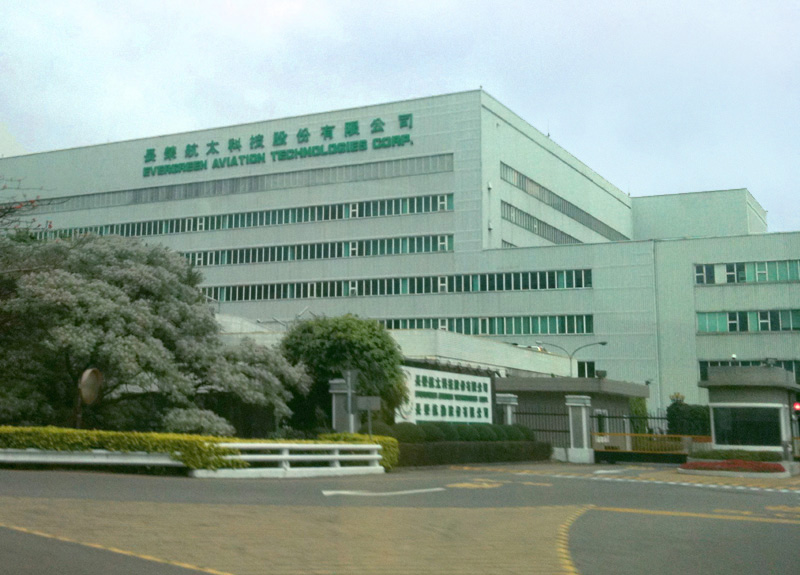
EVA Air's technical facilities at Taiwan Taoyuan International Airport

=== Cultural details ===
EVA Air has differentiated its onboard service by using Taiwanese (Hokkien), Mandarin, Hakka, English, and other languages for its in-flight cabin announcements. The order of Hokkien and Mandarin has varied since the carrier's launch. EVA Air has also used Taiwanese folk songs in its boarding music, including an orchestral form of "Longing for Spring Wind" performed by the Evergreen Group's Evergreen Symphony Orchestra. The carrier's aircraft and employee color scheme has at times been interpreted by observers as support for the Pan-Green Coalition of Taiwanese politics, mainly due to Evergreen founder Chang Yung-fa's political views in the 2000 presidential election, but this association changed following Chang's support of the Pan-Blue Coalition in the 2004 presidential election. The carrier has further abstained from displaying official markings of Taiwan on its aircraft, and received expedited approval of international landing rights as a result.

=== Branding ===
==== Name and logo ====
The name "EVA" was taken from two letters of "Evergreen" and the first letter of "Airways." The name "EVA" is always spelled in capital letters and is pronounced "E-V-A". However, the ICAO callsign is pronounced "Eva". The airline uses the logo of its parent company, using green with an orange trim. The orange trim was removed on the current logo.

==== Livery and uniforms ====
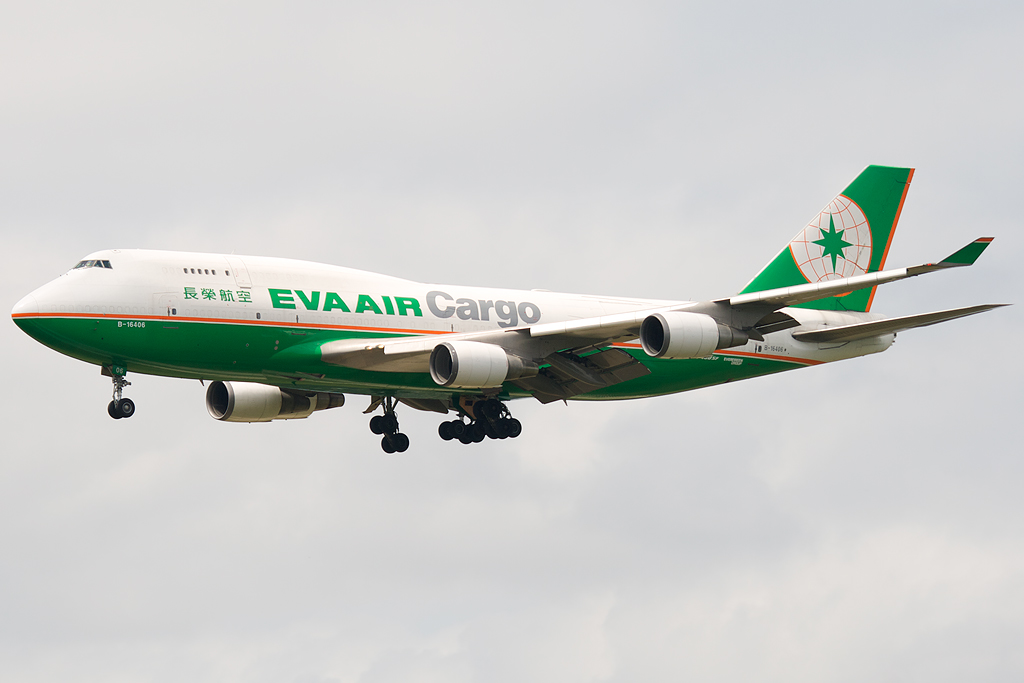
An EVA Air Cargo Boeing 747-400BDSF in the 2001–2015 livery

The standard EVA Air livery utilizes dark green, signifying durability, and orange, representing technological innovation. Originally, both the globe and background behind the globe were painted a respective shade of green on their initial 767-300ERs in 1991. This was later changed to the first standard scheme on all other aircraft. The tail globe logo is intended to represent stability and reliability, and its positioning on the tail, with one corner off the edge, represents service innovation. The first standard EVA Air livery was updated in 2002, adding a larger typeface and the use of green covering the aircraft below the window line. The tail design and logo remained unchanged. In late 2015, EVA Air redesigned the livery and tail logo, using the dark green color on the belly, and cancelled the orange line on the edge of the tail to highlight the corporate identity.

Since 2003, EVA Air has adopted its current uniform, featuring dark green dresses with cropped jackets. Chief pursers are distinguished by orange highlights, gold bands, and orange stripes; flight attendants feature green trim and white stripes. The current uniform replaced the former green-and-orange necktie ensembles used in EVA Air's first twelve years.

==== Marketing slogans ====
EVA Air has used different slogans throughout its operational history. The first slogan appeared on English language advertising in the United States, while the 1996 and 2003 versions were introduced internationally in both English and Mandarin. In 2005, a second "Sharing the world" slogan was introduced to complement the arrival of the airline's Boeing 777s. EVA Air slogans have been as follows:

- Flying into the Future (2016–present)

=== Divisions ===
==== EVA Air Cargo ====
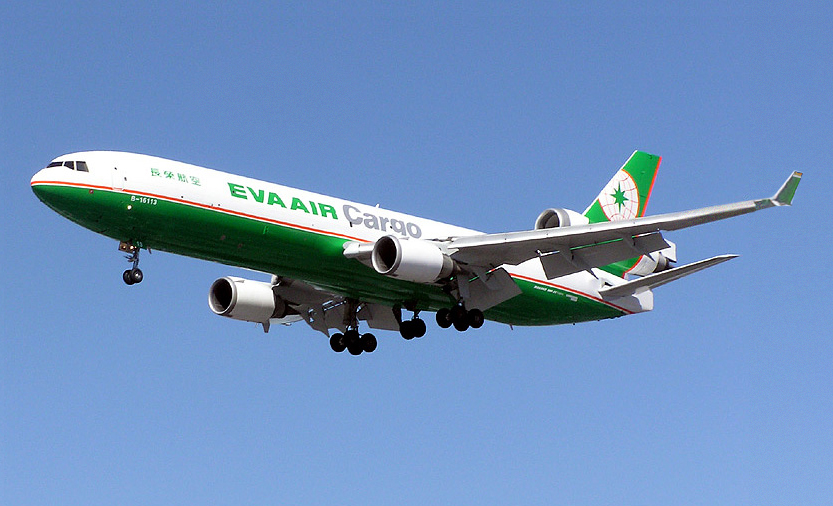
An EVA Air Cargo McDonnell Douglas MD-11F

Founded concurrently with the passenger operations of EVA Air, EVA Air Cargo operates facilities in Europe, Asia, and North America. Its cargo operations have diversified to include transportation of high-tech equipment and special care items such as museum artwork and live animals. EVA Air has stated its goal of achieving a 50/50 split in revenues between its passenger and cargo operations. The airline's cargo operations are mainly operated via a fleet of Boeing 747-400, MD-11 dedicated freighters, Boeing 747-400 Combi aircraft, and additional belly cargo space on passenger aircraft.

Following the establishment of its A330 fleet and the introduction of Boeing 777 long-haul aircraft, the airline converted some of its older Boeing 747-400 passenger aircraft to freighters to meet cargo market demands. EVA Air Cargo established its European Cargo Center in Brussels in 2003 and opened its Southern China Cargo Center in Hong Kong in 2006.

As of 2007, EVA Air Cargo had 43 weekly cargo flights to London, Vienna, Brussels and US destinations including Los Angeles, Dallas/Fort Worth, Chicago, Atlanta and New York. The carrier also has code-shares with international airlines including Air Nippon (a subsidiary of All Nippon Airways), British Airways World Cargo, Austrian Airlines and Lufthansa Cargo.

In recent years, the airline has focused its North American cargo operations solely on point-to-point routes. By 2004, EVA Air Cargo ranked among the world's top 10 largest air freight companies. Industry publication Air Cargo World ranked EVA Air Cargo sixth out of 50 in its 2008 Air Cargo Excellence Survey, a measure of cargo service customer service and performance. In 2008, EVA Air handled the transport of two giant pandas, donated as a gift to Taipei Zoo.

==== Maintenance and support ====
EVA Air service divisions further include pilot and cabin attendant training facilities, along with its Evergreen Sky Catering and Evergreen Airline Services ground support divisions. EVA Air has partnered with General Electric since 1998 to operate the Evergreen Aviation Technologies Corporation (EGAT), a heavy maintenance and aircraft overhaul service. Evergreen Aviation Technologies Corporation provides safety, repair, and refit services for EVA Air, other airlines' aircraft, and has handled the modification of four Boeing 747 Large Cargo Freighter aircraft for Boeing's 787 Dreamliner production program.

== Destinations ==
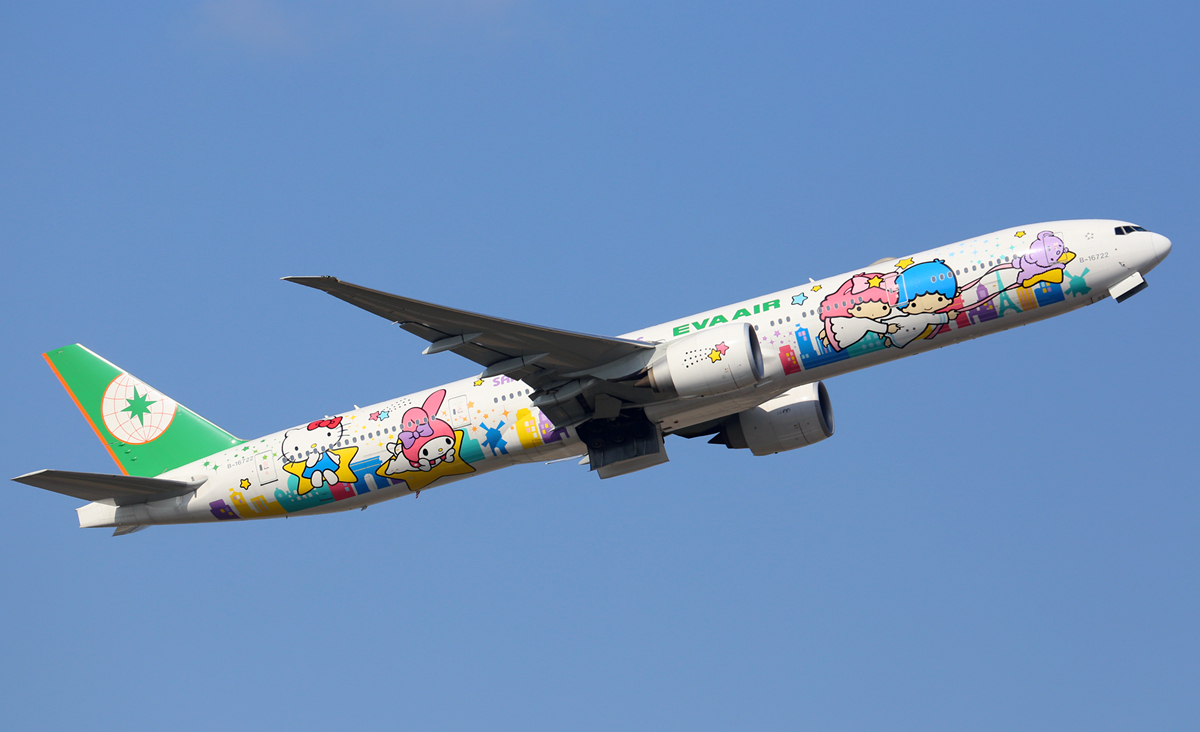
Boeing 777-300ER (B-16722) in Hello Kitty Shining Star special livery

Most EVA Air flights originate out of Taoyuan International Airport, its main hub near Taipei, Taiwan. At Taoyuan International Airport, EVA Air's flight operations are concentrated in Terminal 2. Additionally, EVA Air and its domestic subsidiary UNI Air operate numerous flights out of Kaohsiung International Airport. A focus city for EVA Air outside of Taiwan is Bangkok, (its main hub being Suvarnabhumi Airport), with westerly connections to all its European destinations except for Paris, Munich, and Milan which are flown non-stop. Vienna is served both non-stop from Taipei and via Bangkok.

Through the mid-2000s, EVA Air's route network was affected by the political status of Taiwan, which has historically limited access for Taiwanese airlines to Europe and certain Asian countries. Because Taiwanese carriers did not have direct access to China, EVA Air has used Hong Kong, Bangkok and Macau as interline destinations. EVA Air operated regular charter flights to China in 2008. The airline began regularly scheduled, direct cross-strait operations in December 2008, following the restoration of direct travel links.

A Houston (George Bush Intercontinental Airport) route was opened in June 2015, and service to Chicago (O'Hare International Airport) began on 2 November 2016, using a 777-300ER, as part of a planned increase in North American flights from 58 flights to 77 flights a week.

EVA Air launched a new year-round service to Istanbul on 5 March 2016, operating 777-300ER aircraft. This route was first downgraded to a seasonal frequency and then cancelled altogether by September 2016. EVA Air also launched daily service to Cebu, Philippines on 27 March 2016 using A321-200 aircraft. Furthermore, EVA Air expanded its Southeast Asian services by offering daily flights to Chiang Mai on 1 July 2018.

In November 2024, EVA Air president Clay Sun revealed that the airline will commence flight from Taipei to Dallas beginning 3 November 2025. Dallas will be the airline's 7th destination in the United States after Houston, New York, Los Angeles, Chicago, Seattle and San Francisco. This will also mark Taipei, the capital of Taiwan, to be the fifth Asian city to service nonstop route to Dallas-Fort Worth after Tokyo, Seoul, Hong Kong and Shanghai. In July 2026, EVA Air will add another US destination, Washington, D.C. with 4 weekly flights.

=== Codeshare agreements ===
EVA Air has codeshare agreements with the following airlines:

- Aegean Airlines
- Air Canada
- Air China
- Air India
- Air Macau
- Air New Zealand
- All Nippon Airways
- Asiana Airlines
- Avianca
- Bangkok Airways
- Copa Airlines
- Hainan Airlines
- Hong Kong Airlines
- Juneyao Air
- LOT Polish Airlines
- Shandong Airlines
- Shenzhen Airlines
- Singapore Airlines
- Thai Airways International
- Turkish Airlines
- Uni Air (Subsidiary)
- United Airlines

=== Interline agreements ===
EVA Air has interline agreements with the following airlines:

- Air New Zealand
- Deutsche Bahn(railway)
- Eurostar (railway)
- ÖBB (railway)
- Lao Airlines
- Southwest Airlines
- NMBS/SNCB (railway)
- Shanghai Airlines
- Singapore Airlines
- Taiwan High Speed Rail (railway)
- Trenitalia (railway)

== Fleet ==
=== Current fleet ===
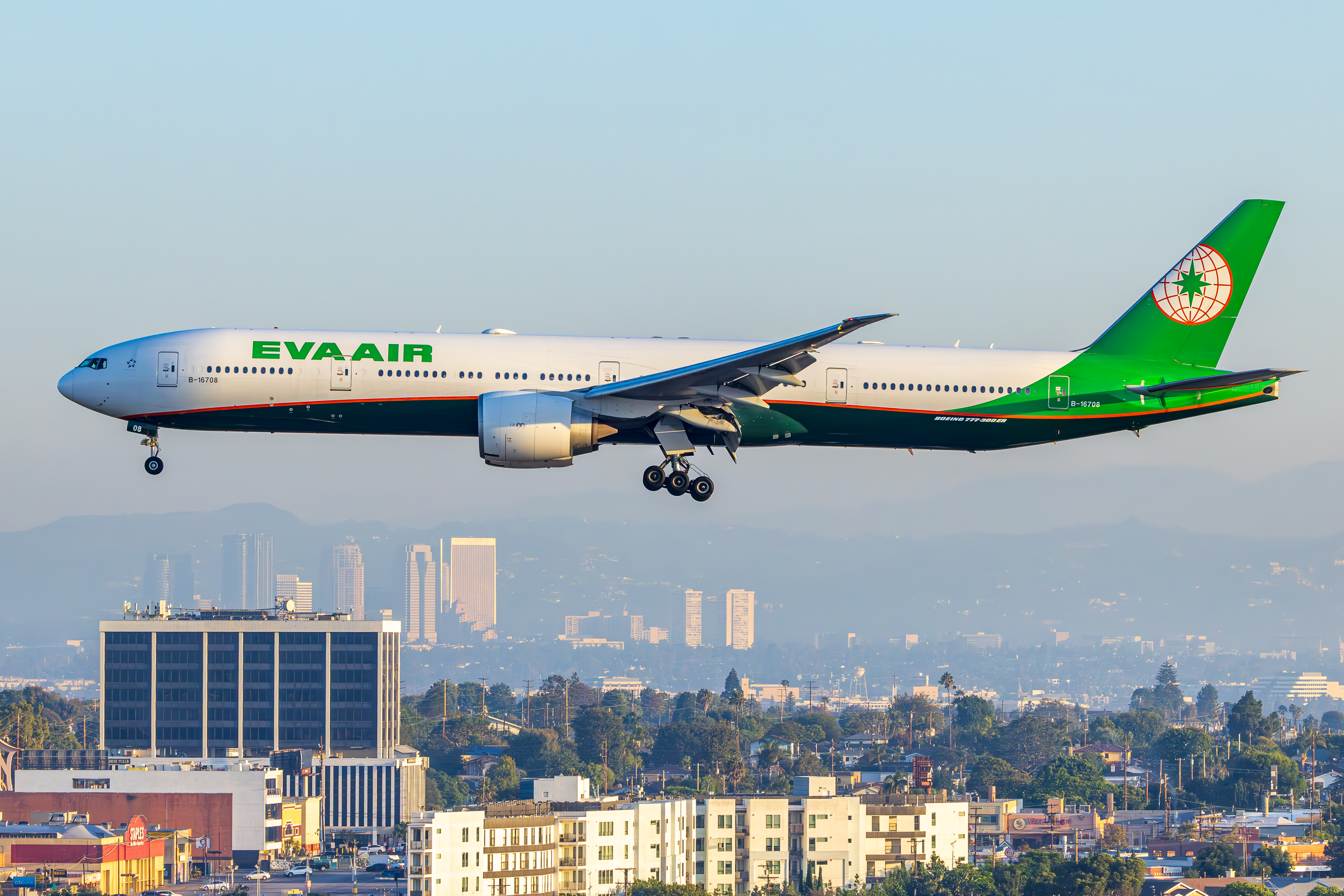
EVA Air Boeing 777-300ER

As of December 2025, EVA Air operates the following aircraft:

EVA Air fleet
Aircraft	In service	Orders	Passengers					Notes
Aircraft	In service	Orders	R	C	W	Y	Total	Notes
Airbus A321-200	17	—	—	8	—	176	184	All to be retired and replaced by Airbus A321neo in 2032.
Airbus A321neo	—	18	TBA					Deliveries between 2029 and 2032. To replace Airbus A321-200.
Airbus A330-300	9	—	—	30	—	279	309	To be retired and replaced by Boeing 787-9 in 2029.
Airbus A350-1000	—	24	TBA					To replace older Boeing 777-300ER. Deliveries between 2027 and 2030.
Boeing 777-300ER	32	—	38	—	64	221	323	Three aircraft to be converted into freighters starting from 2025. Older aircraft to be retired and replaced by Airbus A350-1000.
Boeing 777-300ER	32	—	39	—	56	238	333	Three aircraft to be converted into freighters starting from 2025. Older aircraft to be retired and replaced by Airbus A350-1000.
Boeing 777-300ER	32	—	39	—	56	258	353	Three aircraft to be converted into freighters starting from 2025. Older aircraft to be retired and replaced by Airbus A350-1000.
Boeing 787-9	8	9	26	—	28	224	278	Orders changed from Boeing 787-10. Additional five aircraft to be delivered between 2025 and 2027. To replace Airbus A330-300.
Boeing 787-10	13	4	34	—	—	308	342	Originally ordered 24 in 2015.
EVA Air Cargo fleet
Boeing 777F	9	—	Cargo					Orders changed from Boeing 787-10.
Boeing 777-300ER/SF	—	3	Cargo					To be converted from passenger aircraft. Conversion to start from 2025.
Total	87	51						

=== Former fleet ===
EVA Air former fleet
Aircraft	Fleet	Introduced	Retired	Notes
Airbus A320-200	1	2007	2009	
Airbus A330-200	11	2003	2024	
ATR 72-600	2	2016	2022	Transferred to subsidiary Uni Air.
Boeing 747-400	5	1992	2017	Last flight took place on 21 August 2017.
Boeing 747-400BDSF	6	1999	2019	
Boeing 747-400F	3	2000	2018	
Boeing 747-400F	1	2000	2018	Leased from Atlas Air.
Boeing 747-400M	5	1993	2015	
Boeing 747-400M	6	1993	2015	Converted into freighter and transferred to EVA Air Cargo.
Boeing 757-200	2	2002	2004	
Boeing 767-200	4	1994	2005	
Boeing 767-300ER	5	1991	2007	
McDonnell Douglas MD-11	3	1992	2003	Converted into freighter and transferred to EVA Air Cargo.
McDonnell Douglas MD-11F	9	1992	2015	
McDonnell Douglas MD-11F	3	1992	2015	Converted from retired passenger fleets.
McDonnell Douglas MD-90-30	14	1996	2016	

=== Special liveries ===
In October 2005, EVA Air launched a campaign with Japanese company Sanrio to create the "Hello Kitty Jet," featuring the popular Japanese character. Using the airline's A330-200, the exterior adopted a livery featuring Sanrio characters. A year later, the airline launched a second Hello Kitty Jet. The aircraft featured a Hello Kitty motif on exterior and interior furnishings and features. Both aircraft were used to serve Japanese destinations, and from mid-July 2007, Taipei-Hong Kong routes. The original Hello Kitty livery was retired in 2009, but in 2011, EVA Air announced its return in redesigned form to mark the carrier's 20th anniversary and renew interest in Japanese tourism. For this occasion, EVA Air had ordered brand-new Airbus A330-300s to be painted in an all-new Hello Kitty livery, known as Hello Kitty with Magic Stars, Hello Kitty Loves Apples, and Hello Kitty Around the World.

After the introduction of the "refreshed" Hello Kitty Livery on three EVA Air A330s, EVA Air decided to introduce two additional Hello Kitty A330 jets, launched in May and June 2012. The fourth and fifth Hello Kitty jets are known as Hello Kitty Speed Puff and Hello Kitty Happy Music respectively. In 2013, the carrier rolled out its sixth Hello Kitty jet, Hand in Hand, this time on a Boeing 777-300ER, until it was repainted in the new EVA Air livery in May 2021. The aircraft featured popular Sanrio characters. In 2015, the seventh and final Hello Kitty jet, the Boeing 777-300ER Shining Star, featuring the Little Twin Stars and My Melody, rolled out, until it was re-themed into Besties.

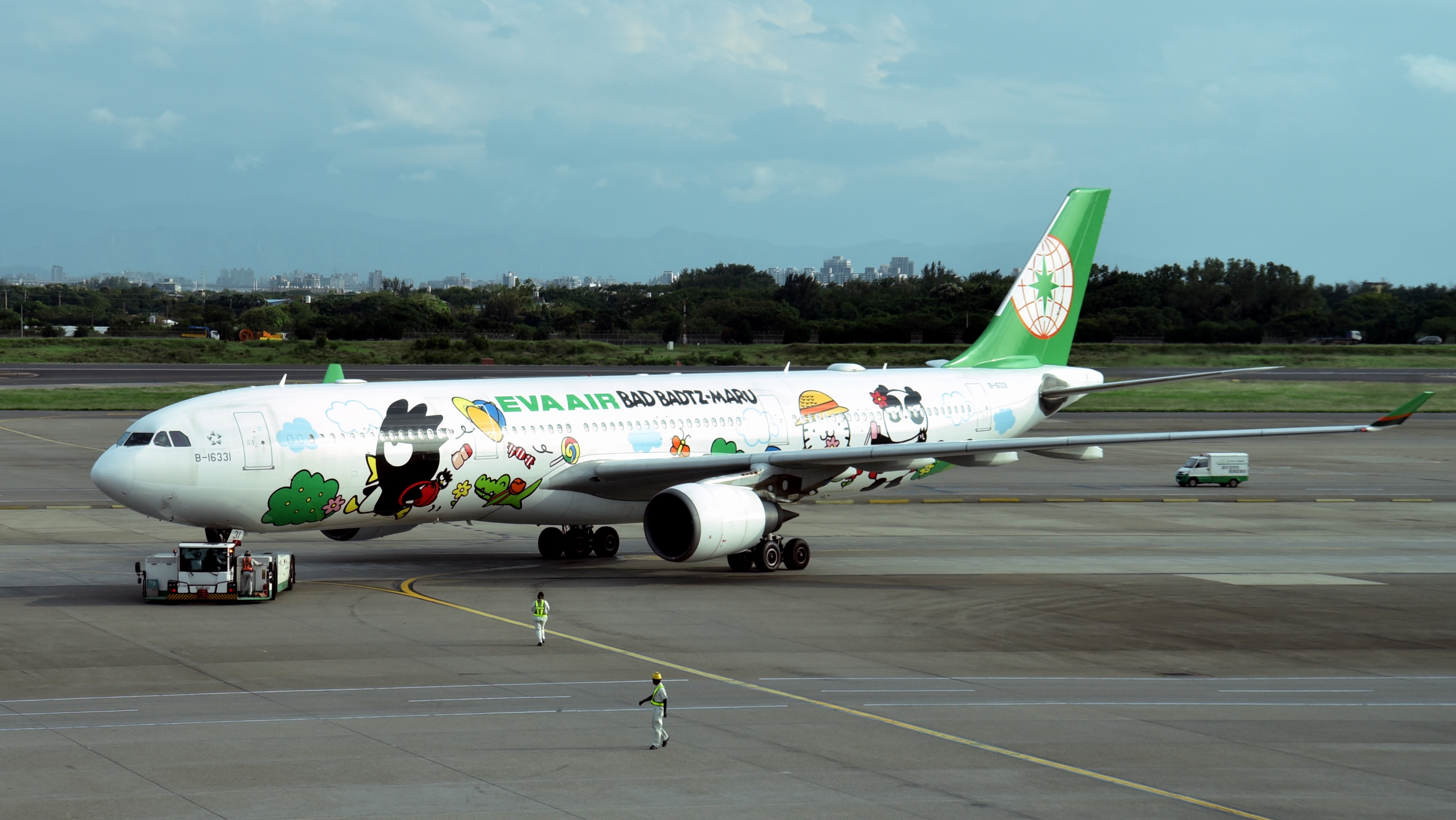
The EVA Air Airbus A330-300 in the Bad Badtz-Maru Travel Fun livery

In 2017, the first three of the Hello Kitty jets were re-themed into Bad Badtz-Maru Travel Fun, Joyful Dream, and Celebration Flight respectively. At the same time, the Gudetama-themed Comfort Flight was added onto the A321, and the Hello Kitty Speed Puff and Hello Kitty Happy Music were phased out.

In November 2024, an Airbus A321-200 was painted in the Hello Kitty Pinky livery.

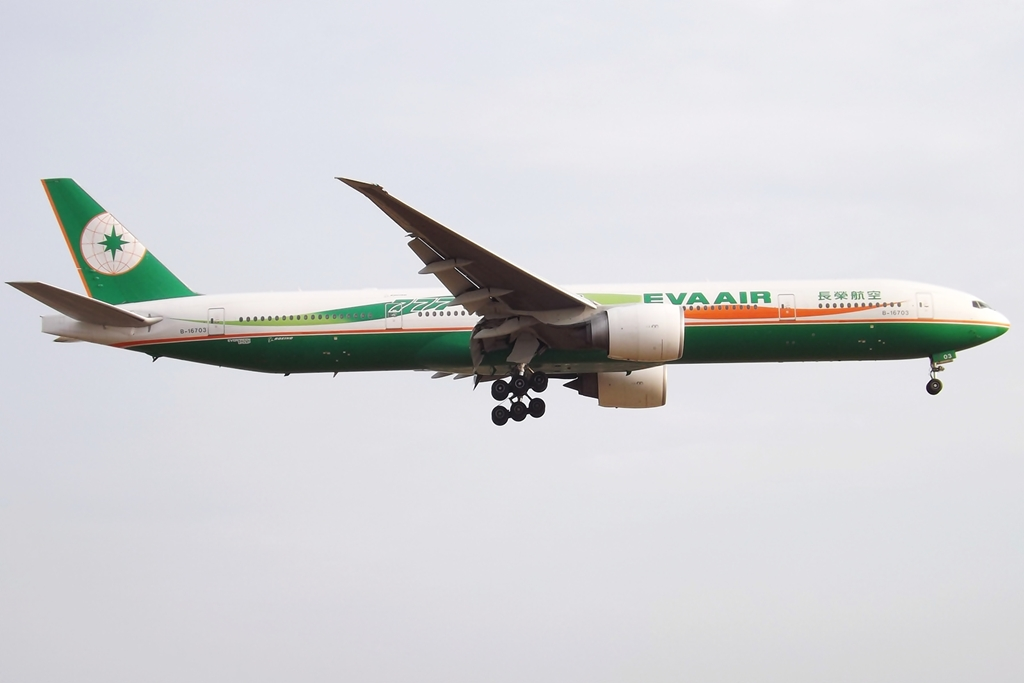
An EVA Air Boeing 777-300ER in the Rainbow special livery, painted from 2006 to 2013

In July 2006, EVA Air's third new Boeing 777-300ER was Boeing's center stage at the 2006 Farnborough Airshow in a static display. The aircraft, with its special 777-300ER "Rainbow" livery, was leased by Boeing for a week to be presented at the show. The first three EVA Air Boeing 777 aircraft featured this livery, which were repainted in 2013 (B-16701 in Star Alliance livery, B-16702 in regular livery, B-16703 in Hello Kitty "Hand in Hand" livery, which was repainted in the standard livery in 2021).

For the 2010 Taipei International Flora Exposition, EVA Air debuted a floral design for its A330-200 aircraft, highlighting the carrier's official sponsorship of the event; the "Flora Expo cabin concept" introduced products such as inflight meals with a floral motif.

=== Fleet plans ===
The majority of EVA Air's long-haul fleet is based on the Boeing 777-300ER, with the carrier's initial order for 15 all delivered by 2011. In 2006, the airline decided against proceeding with an order for two Boeing 777-200LR (stating that with the 777-300ERs would give it sufficient passenger capacity), and they were converted into orders for two 777-200F cargo aircraft. In late 2010, EVA Air indicated it planned to lease three A330-300 aircraft for Asian routes in 2011. In mid-2011, EVA Air announced plans to acquire further 777-300ERs to complete the replacement of its 747-400 aircraft on Europe and US routes, along with A321 series narrow-body jets to replace its MD-90 fleet. On 8 May 2012, EVA Air signed orders with Boeing for three additional 777-300ERs, and also announced a lease of four more 777-300ERs. Due to falling freight demand, the airline restructured its cargo fleet by retiring its McDonnell Douglas MD-11s. The last 747-400M flight was conducted on 5 January 2015, ending its 22-year service.

At the Paris Airshow in 2015, EVA Air announced its intention to purchase five Boeing 777F cargo aircraft and four Airbus A330-300s. EVA Air confirmed the order of up to 24 Boeing 787-10s and two additional Boeing 777-300ERs. It also announced the additional lease of 787 aircraft.

EVA announced in late 2015 that it would be retiring all of its leased A330-200 aircraft by the end of 2016, replacing them with the newly ordered A330-300s.

Following the changes of air traffic demand due to the COVID-19 pandemic, the airline switched 7 787-10s with 4 787-9s and 3 777Fs. Regarding the replacement of the 777-300ER passenger aircraft, the airline ordered 18 Airbus A350-1000 aircraft in November 2023 to replace the first batch models (those built between 2005 and 2010), three of which would be converted to freighters under EVA Air Cargo to supplement the 777-200F. The later batch models (those built between 2014 and 2017) can be replaced with either the 777-9 or additional A350-1000 orders. As with the older Airbus fleet, 15 A321neos are ordered from Airbus to replace the older A321's, while the A330s are planned to be replaced by further 787 orders by 2029.

=== 747 retirements ===
As the 777s continued to phase in, the 747s were progressively retired. On 5 January 2015, EVA Air retired its first 747 variant, the 747-400M Combi. In 2016, EVA announced that the last 747-400 passenger service would be mid-May 2017. The airline also plans to retire the 747 freighters when the 777 freighters are delivered. EVA retired the Boeing 747-400 passenger aircraft from its fleet on 21 August 2017. The following year, the production 747 freighters were retired, leaving the converted 747 freighters in service until 2019.

== Services ==
Hello Kitty Flights EVA Air operated Hello Kitty-themed flights from 2005 to 2008, and reintroduced them in 2011. These flights remain operational as of February 2026.

=== Check-in ===
At Taiwan Taoyuan International Airport, EVA Air has introduced the EVA Air Check-in Kiosks at T2, counters 6A, allowing passengers to check in and print their boarding passes electronically, since December 2009. The kiosks are currently available at Taiwan Taoyuan International Airport and Taipei Songshan Airport. Over time, EVA will install these counters in airports in China and other international EVA Air destinations. Outside of Taiwan, it is only currently available in Los Angeles, Tokyo, and Osaka. Previously, passengers checking in for an EVA Air flight would have to go to an airline representative at the counters.

=== Onboard ===
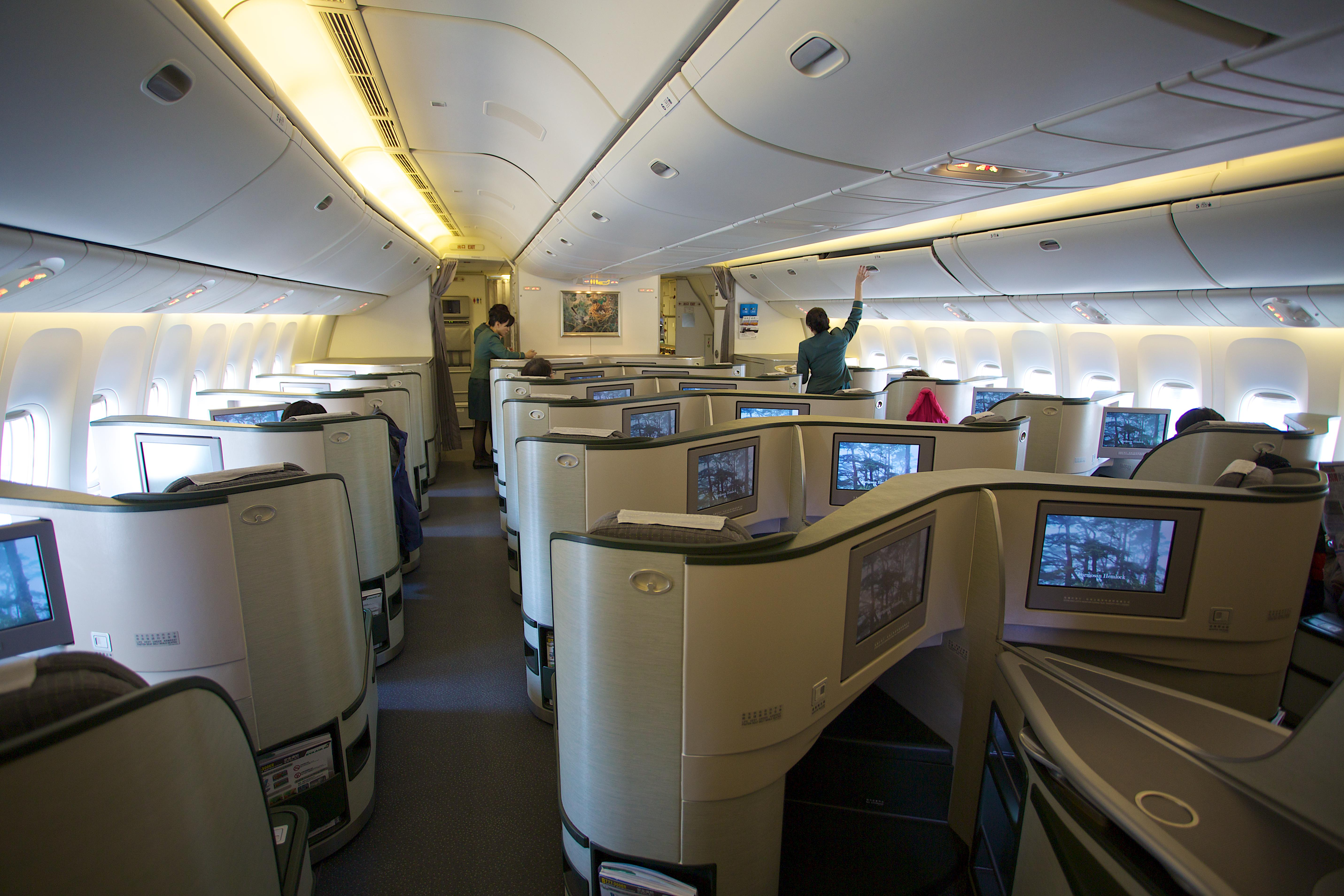
The Royal Laurel Class cabin on board one of EVA Air's Boeing 777-300ERs, arranged in a reverse herringbone layout

EVA Air offers three classes of service on its long-haul flights: "Royal Laurel"/"Premium Laurel" (business), Premium Economy Class, and Economy Class. All cabins feature satellite phones, audio video on demand (AVOD) entertainment, SMS service, and in a number of Boeing 777 cabins, mood lighting (B-16718-B-16738). Domestic and short-haul international services flown also feature a short-haul business class.

In the latter half of 2007, EVA Air's Boeing 747-400 fleet was upgraded to feature the airline's latest seating classes; the addition of Premium Laurel class on the Boeing 747-400 succeeded the previous "Super First" and "Super Business" cabins. In early 2012, EVA Air officials unveiled a redesigned "Royal Laurel" business class, including 180-degree, fully flat seats in reverse herringbone layout, which was first introduced on Boeing 777-300ER services in June 2012 between Taipei and New York.

==== Cabin classes ====
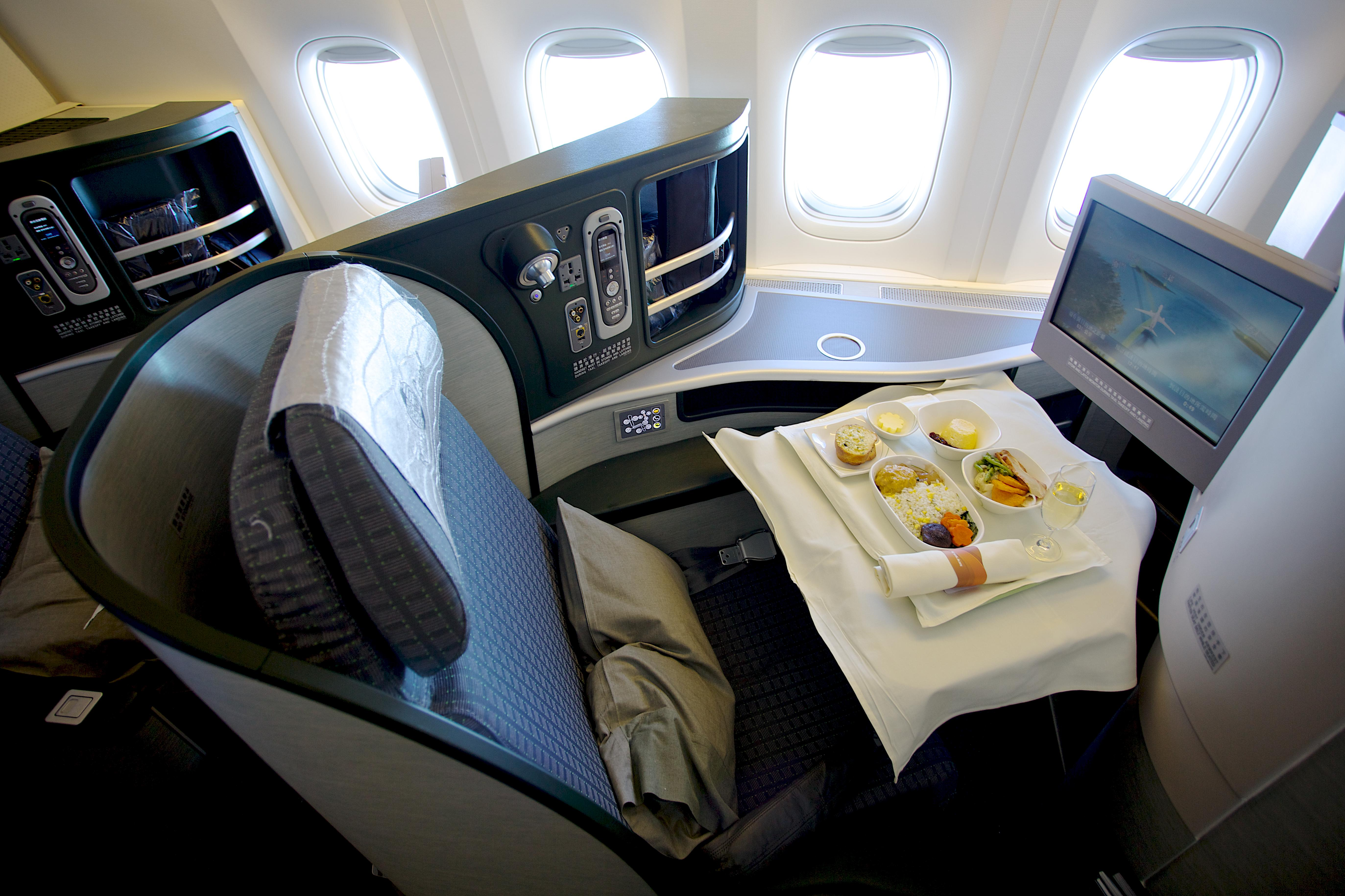
EVA Air's previous Royal Laurel Class seat on a Boeing 777-300ER

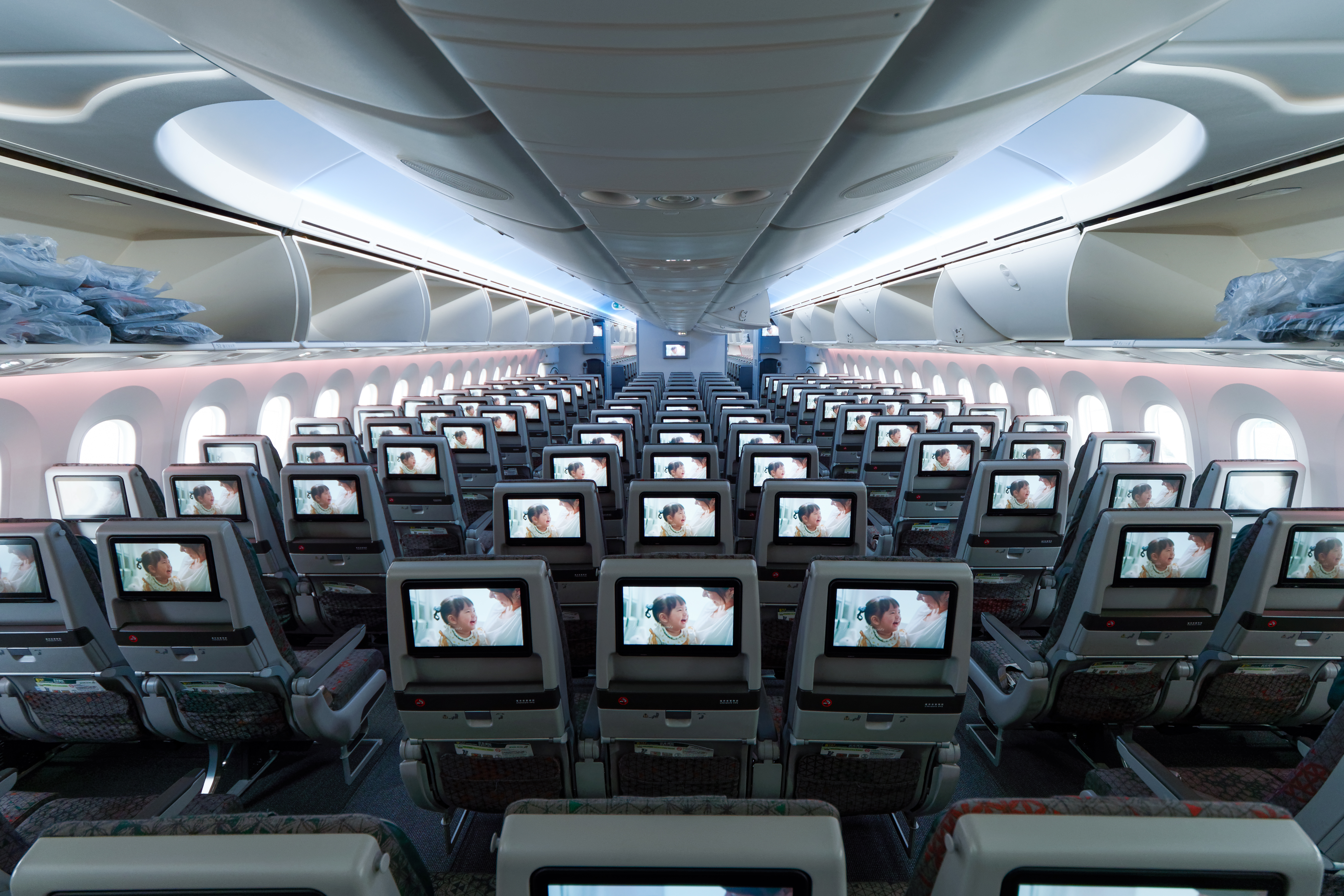
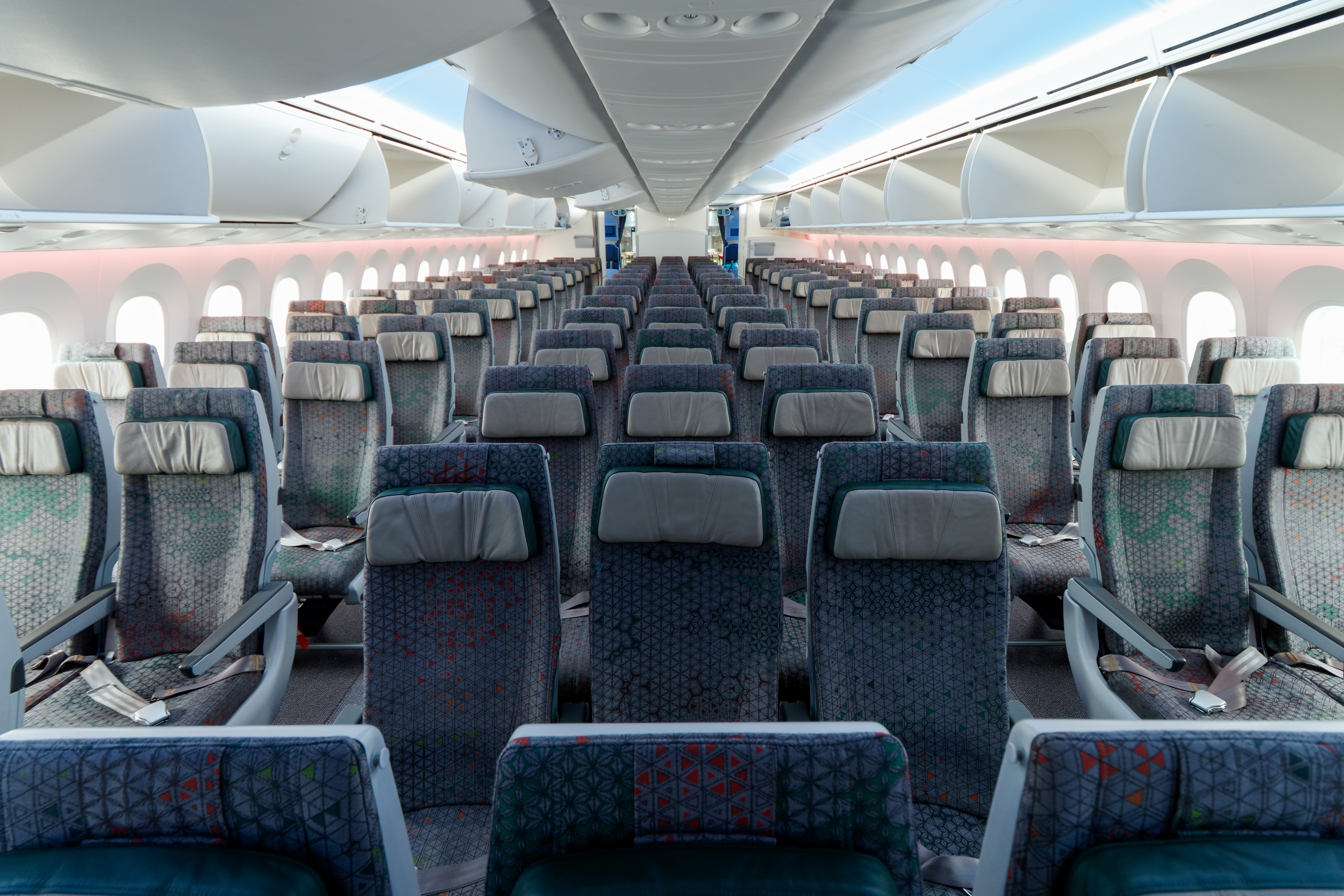
The economy cabin on board one of EVA Air's Boeing 787-9s

EVA Air currently has five classes. In May 2012, EVA Air announced the introduction of a new business class on select, redesigned Boeing 777-300ER aircraft: Royal Laurel Class. The cabin features 38 lie-flat bed/seats in a reverse herringbone configuration pitched at 2,000 and 650 mm (79 and 26 in) wide. Laptop power and multi-port connectors (USB/iPod) are available at each seat. The Royal Laurel class seating arrangement is in a 1–2–1 abreast arrangement. The airline is offering this cabin on all flights operated by the Boeing 777. On 20 September 2018, EVA Air debuted the Boeing 787 Royal Laurel Class. The seat was designed by Designworks, a BMW Group company. The new Royal Laurel Class seats are 584 mm (23 in) wide and recline into flat-bed positions that have a pitch of 1,930 mm (76 in) long. There are 26 Royal Laurel Class seats on the Boeing 787-9. The Royal Laurel Class cabin on the Boeing 787-10 features 40 seats.

Premium Laurel Class, EVA Air's existing business class cabin, was introduced in 2003 with the A330-200, and expanded to more destinations with the Boeing 777-300ER in 2005 and refitted Boeing 747-400 (replacing "Super First") in 2007. Seats are pitched at 1,549 mm (61.0 in) in Premium Laurel in a pod-style layout, and can convert to an angled lie-flat bed. Laptop power is available. Premium Laurel class seating is in a 2–2–2 abreast arrangement on the A330. In 2016, Premium Laurel was upgraded to the new B/E Aerospace seats in a 2-2-2 configuration.

Business Class, EVA Air's short haul business class cabin on the A321, consists of eight seats. These seats feature a 10.6-inch in-flight entertainment system and 110 V power outlets. Seat pitch is 45 inches.

Premium Economy Class is offered in a dedicated cabin on the Boeing 777. Premium Economy Class has wider seating and legroom (in a 2-4-2 layout), and a seat similar to short-haul business class with a footrest, 970 to 1,020 mm (38 to 40 in) pitch, adjustable winged headrests, and laptop power. Service levels in Premium Economy Class are similar to Economy Class, but food and amenities are improved, along with the seating. Premium Economy passengers further receive an amenity kit on most flights. There are two or four lavatories (dependent on aircraft configuration) that are dedicated to Premium Economy Class passengers.

Economy Class is available on all EVA Air aircraft, featuring 840 mm (33 in) pitch, touchscreen personal entertainment screens, sliding seat cushions, and adjustable winged headrests. Each seat is also equipped with a personal handset satellite telephone which can be used with a credit card. Economy seating is in 3–3–3 arrangement on the Boeing 777 featuring Collins Aerospace Pinnacle seats and Boeing 787 Dreamliner featuring Recaro CL3710 seats, 3–4–3 on certain Boeing 777 aircraft, 3–3 on the A321, and 2–4–2 on all A330s. In Economy Class of the A321 there is no personal entertainment, with only overhead screens.

A new Economy and Premium Economy cabin is available on 777-300ER aircraft. Those new seats have improved entertainment systems and USB and 110 V AC ports in each seat. It includes a seat-back screen that is 11.1 inches, compared to the previous 9 inches. In 2018, EVA Air renamed Elite Class to Premium Economy Class.

==== In-flight entertainment ====
EVA Air's audio video on demand (AVOD) entertainment system, Star Gallery, is available in all classes, except Airbus A321 Economy class. This system has 40 movies and short features, interactive games, and over 100 music albums. Programs are mainly in Mandarin and English, with some selections in Japanese, German, and French.

Star Gallery entertainment categories include such areas as Sky Hollywood (films), Sky Concert Hall (music and playlist creator), Kids' World (entertainment geared toward younger travelers), among others. The Panasonic Avionics 3000i system can display Mandarin, English, or Japanese text. On certain aircraft, a Panasonic EX3 system is installed. Since 2005, customers can also send SMS text messages and emails to the ground using their personal handsets and seatback screens. Seatback video is not available in Economy Class on A321-200s.

enVoyage is EVA's inflight magazine and features articles in English, Mandarin and Japanese. EVA Air's duty-free shopping brochure, named EVA Air Sky Shop, is included at each seat in either paper or video form, with sales occurring in-flight, typically after meal services. EVA Air also stocks a supply of newspapers and magazine publications on international flights, selection depending on route.

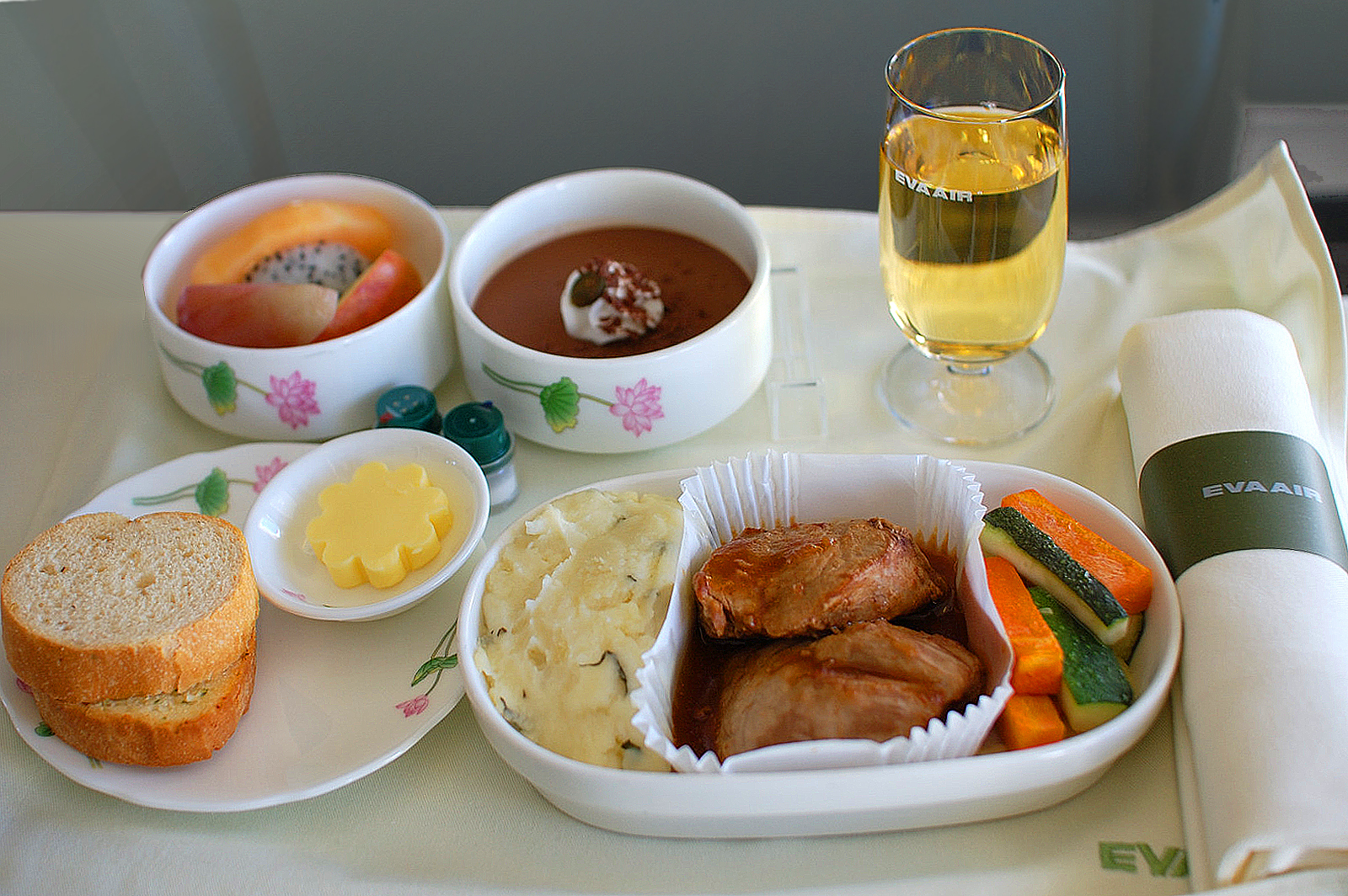
A Business Class meal served on a Taipei (TPE) to Hong Kong (HKG) route

==== Catering ====
EVA Air offers a variety of meals on intercontinental routes, depending on seat class, destination, and flight length. Western and Eastern menu selections are typically offered, including seasonal menu selections varied by destination. Special meal offerings can be requested in each class during booking, including children's, religious, vegetarian, and other meals.

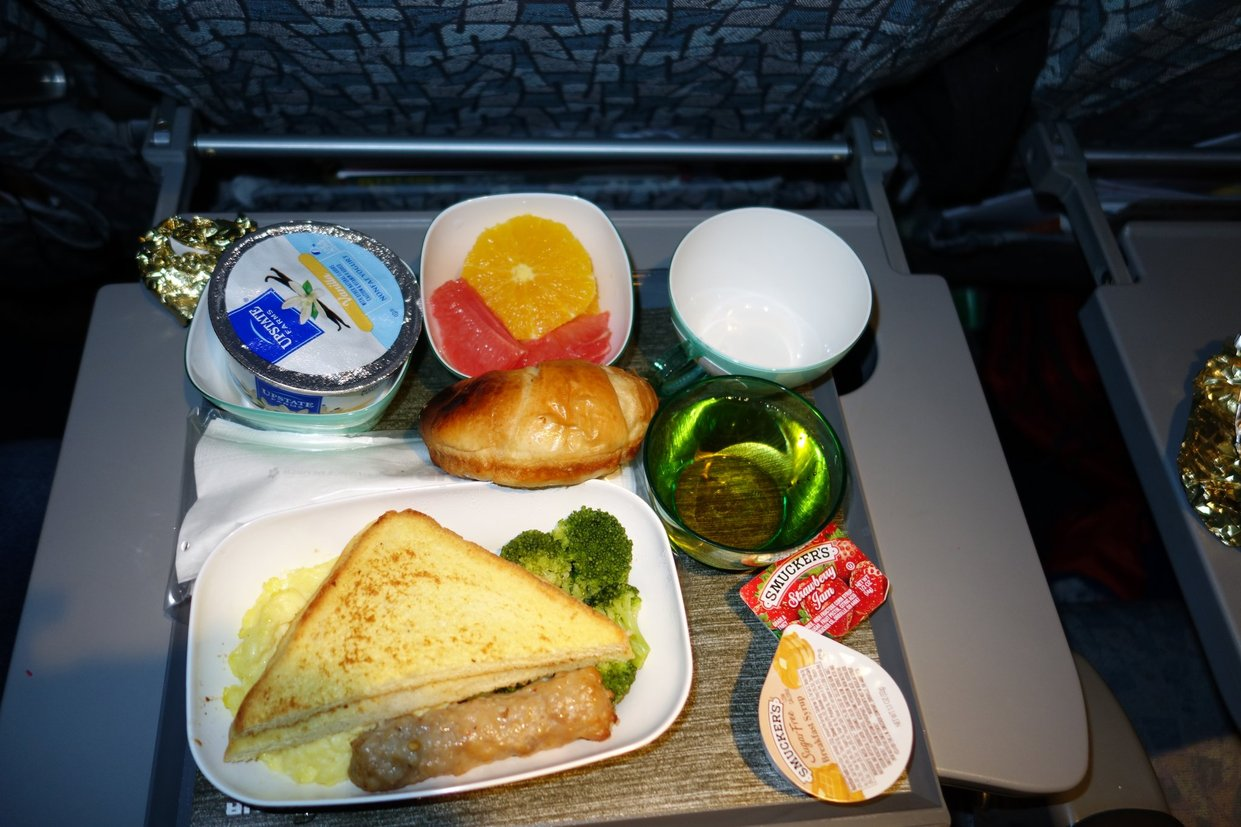
French toast and scrambled eggs on an EVA air flight

In Royal Laurel Class and Premium Laurel Class, passengers can pre-order gourmet entreés, depending on destination, including specialties produced by Din Tai Fung, an award-winning Taiwanese restaurant. Royal Laurel cabins on the Boeing 777 also feature an in-flight refreshment bar, and European wine selections are served.

In 2024 baker Wang Peng-chieh collaborated with EVA Air on their in-flight dining menu.

=== EVA AIR lounges ===
EVA AIR operates airline lounges under the brand name EVA AIR Lounge (formerly branded Evergreen Lounge) in major destination airports. Passengers eligible to enter these facilities include Royal Laurel, Premium Laurel and business class passengers, Infinity MileageLands Diamond, Gold, and Silver Card holders, Star Alliance Gold members, and eligible passengers travelling with airlines that have contracted with EVA Air on the lounge facilities.

EVA Air's four flagship lounges, located at Taiwan Taoyuan International Airport, are:

- The Garden (exclusively to Infinity MileageLands Diamond and American Express Centurion/EVA Air Co-brand Platinum/Citibank EVA Air Co-brand World Cardholders travelling in Royal Laurel/Premium Laurel/Business Class)
- The Infinity (accessible by all eligible passengers above and: Royal Laurel/Premium Laurel/Business Class passengers, Star Alliance First/Business Class Passengers and American Express Centurion/EVA Air Co-brand Platinum/Citibank EVA Air Co-brand World Cardholders travelling in Premium Economy/Economy Class)
- The Star (accessible by all eligible passengers above and: Infinity MileageLands Gold, Star Alliance Gold members, Business customers, Business class/elite passengers travelling with airlines contracted with EGAT on lounge facilities)
- The club by EVA Air (accessible by all eligible passengers above and: Infinity MileageLands Silver, Citibank Diamond Cardholders, Diners Club cardholders and Citibank EVA Air Cobrand Titanium/Platinum Cardholders).

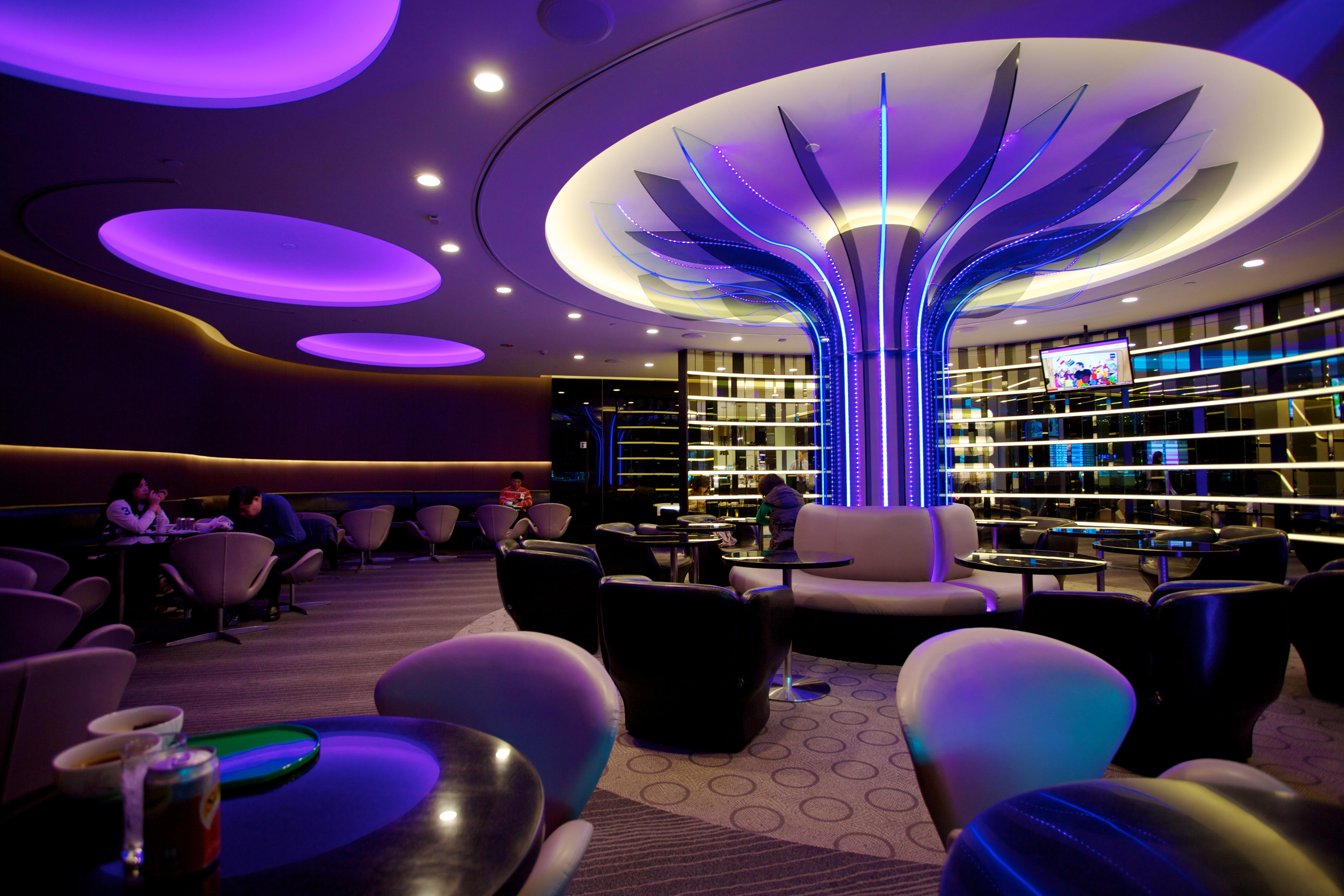
EVA Air's The Infinity lounge at Taoyuan International Airport

EVA Air also operates its EVA AIR lounges at Bangkok and Kaohsiung. It previously operated an outstation lounge at San Francisco.

EVA Air lounge services typically include refreshments, business facilities, and television and reading entertainment.

=== Infinity MileageLands ===
EVA Air's frequent flyer program, Infinity MileageLands, awards members points based on miles traveled and class of service. Infinity MileageLands points are redeemable for upgrades and free tickets, and can also be accumulated through credit card use, rental car agencies, Evergreen Laurel Hotels, and other participating services. Membership benefits include a dedicated reservation line, dedicated customer service hotlines, dedicated check-in services, holiday gifts (Diamond Card Holders), Evergreen Lounge access, additional baggage allowance with priority handling, and discounts on car rentals and hotels.

Membership into the program is free. The program is divided into four tiers: Green, Silver, Gold, and Diamond. Infinity MileageLands privileges are additive by membership tier, with higher tiers including all benefits listed for prior tiers. The program accepts miles flown on partner airlines and Star Alliance partners such as All Nippon Airways, Air Canada, and United Airlines, provided that the flights are booked and logged according to EVA Air frequent flier rules. Co-branded Cathay United Bank, American Express, Citibank, and Diners Club cards can also earn miles. Qualification levels and general benefits are listed on the EVA Air website.

=== Shuttle services ===
EVA Air operates the following shuttle services in the United States and Europe, free for customers:

- To/from John F. Kennedy International Airport (New York City): In New Jersey: Jersey City, Piscataway, Fort Lee, East Hanover, Cherry Hill – In Pennsylvania: South Philadelphia and Cheltenham
- To/from George Bush Intercontinental Airport (Houston): Stops in the Dallas-Fort Worth area: Richardson

== Accidents and incidents ==
To date, EVA Air has not had any aircraft losses or passenger fatalities in its operational history. As of 3 January 2024, EVA Air is ranked number 14 in safety by cntraveler.com. According to the JACDEC Airline Safety Ranking 2018, EVA Air was ranked 15th out of 100 major airlines.

- 16 December 2016: EVA Air Flight 015, a Boeing 777-300ER (registered as B-16726) from Los Angeles International Airport to Taiwan Taoyuan International Airport narrowly missed colliding with Air Canada Flight 788 on takeoff, and subsequently nearly impacted Mount Wilson above Pasadena. With takeoffs that evening rerouted to the rarely used eastbound departure due to weather, the Los Angeles air traffic controller mistakenly told the pilot to turn left instead of right (as they would if the aircraft were taking off westbound, over the ocean). The aircraft complied, and instead headed north, climbing to 5,000-foot (1,500 m) as it headed towards 5,710-foot-high (1,740 m) Mt. Wilson. The EVA aircraft was forced to take evasive action, and climb to 6,000 feet (1,800 m), missing Mt. Wilson by less than 600 feet (180 m). Air Canada Flight 788, also departing Los Angeles, was taking the same route as the EVA aircraft and was forced to climb to 10,000 feet (3,000 m) in evasive action.
- 2 December 2017: EVA Air Flight 035, a Boeing 777-300ER (registered as B-16718) was taxiing for departure at Toronto Pearson International Airport, struck a pole while taxiing in darkness. The aircraft suffered significant damage on its right leading edge and wing surface. The aircraft had not been taxiing on the centerline after deicing and therefore lacked wing clearance with the light pole. The flight was then cancelled.
- 10 June 2023: EVA Air Flight 189 from Taipei Songshan Airport, an Airbus A330-300 (registered as B-16340) heading to Haneda Airport in Tokyo, Japan struck the wing of Thai Airways International Flight 683, also an Airbus A330-300 (registered as HS-TEO, named Chutamat), which was to depart for Bangkok Suvarnabhumi Airport. The Thai Airways aircraft reportedly sustained minor damage, losing part of its wing as a result of the collision. The collision forced one of the runways of Haneda to close.

== Controversies and labor disputes ==
- On 29 January 2019, a female EVA Air flight attendant issued a public complaint after EVA Air falsely accused her of taking part in pornography.
- On 20 June 2019, Taiwan Flight Attendants Union (TFAU) started an air strike. EVA Air and Taiwan Flight Attendants reached an agreement on 7 July 2019, stating that the strike would end on 10 July 2019. About 1440 flights were cancelled and more than 280,000 passengers were affected from the air strike. The strike became the longest strike in Taiwan's history. The airline estimated a prospective loss of about US$97 million as a result of the strike.
- An EVA Air flight attendant fell ill while under assignment on a Taipei to Milan flight on 22 September 2025. Her supervisor was alleged to ignore her requests for sick leave or medical assistance; upon returning to Taiwan on 25 September, she was admitted to Hospital where she died on 8 October 2025. The airline reportedly asked her for documentation for leave after her death. The incident has since raised allegations of overwork and frequent dismissal of employee health, and triggered investigations and calls for more relaxed working conditions.

== See also ==
- List of airlines of Taiwan
- Air transport in Taiwan
- List of airports in Taiwan
- List of companies of Taiwan
- Transportation in Taiwan
