= Wang Peng-chieh =

Taiwanese baker

Wang Peng-chieh (Chinese: 王鵬傑) is a Taiwanese baker, in 2018 he was awarded the title of international Master de la Boulangerie at the Coupe du Monde de la Boulangerie.

== Early life and education ==
As a youth Wang joined a temple dance troupe as an act of rebellion. Wang's father is a baker. Because baking was the family trade Wang initially resented being forced into it at a young age. Looking back Wang said "Bread stole my childhood.”

== Career ==
Wang received coaching in international competition baking from Wu Pao-chun.

In 2018 he was awarded the title of international Master de la Boulangerie at the Coupe du Monde de la Boulangerie. His winning creation was an Eight Generals themed bread.

In 2024 Wang collaborated with EVA Air on their in-flight dining menu.

Wang was a member of the Taiwanese team which placed 5th at the 2025 Mondial du Pain competition.

== Personal life ==
Wang got engaged to his partner immediately following his 2018 win.
