= Ma La Sun (wine) =

Taiwanese wine brand

Ma La Sun (Chinese: 馬拉桑) is a brand of millet wine, originally used in Taiwanese film director Wei Te-sheng's movie Cape No. 7. The phrase "Ma La Sun" originally means "drunk" in Ami language. This product was invented and sold by Farmers' Association in Xinyi, Nantou, with an advertising slogan "A Thousand Years Tradition. A Brand New Taste."

== Origin ==
In 2006, for the need of filming Cape No. 7, Wei Te-sheng asked Shinyi Hsiang Farmers' Association from Nantou County to create a brand of wine "A little tacky, a little cute, and feel local." So they invented the millet wine Ma La Sun after a month, and made it a real product after the movie. Thanks to the movie's blockbuster hit, Ma La Sun quickly become a famous brand in Taiwan.
