= Herringbone seating =

Seating arrangement

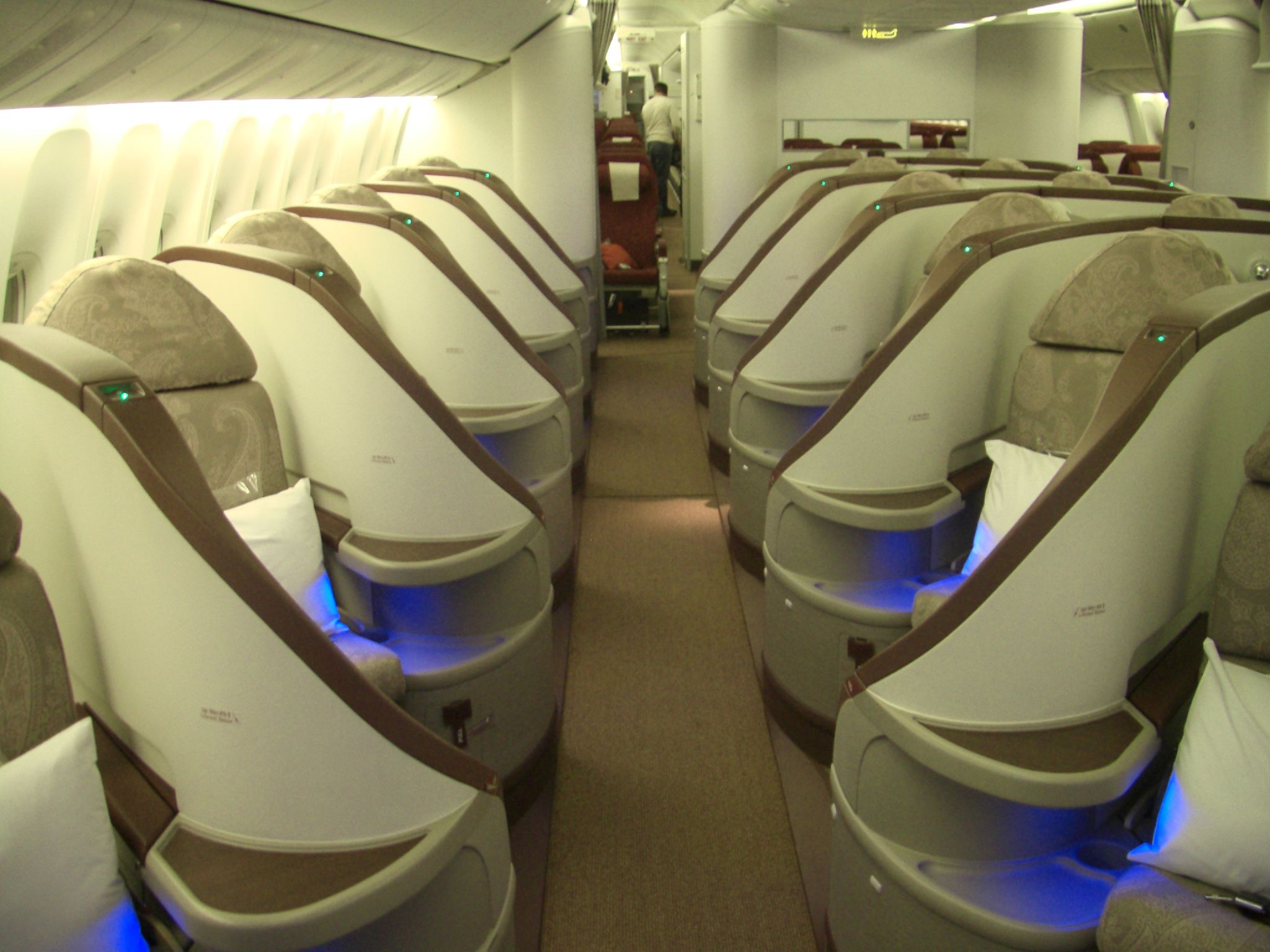
Jet Airways 777 premiere class

A herringbone seating arrangement describes the positioning of seats partially and equally askew in one direction. As the name suggests, the arrangement of the seats looks very similar to the skeleton of a fish, and has been called "fish-bone seats" in a few languages. The term is derived from the arrangement of interlocking brickwork, and has been applied for seating found in aircraft, buses and theatres. Virgin Atlantic was the first airline to use herringbone seats on their aircraft.

Following the adoption of herringbone seating by other airlines, Virgin Atlantic filed a lawsuit against the seat manufacturer, Contour Aerospace, and airlines that have purchased and installed herringbone seats in their aircraft. Virgin Atlantic claims that they own the patent to the seats and that the other airlines have violated it.

Herringbone seating allows all passengers to have direct access to an aisle, and provides increased privacy. However, passenger access to a window may be limited. To moderate cost, economy airlines may compromise seat width for seat length, leading some passengers to feel as if their seats are narrow, claustrophobic cubicles.

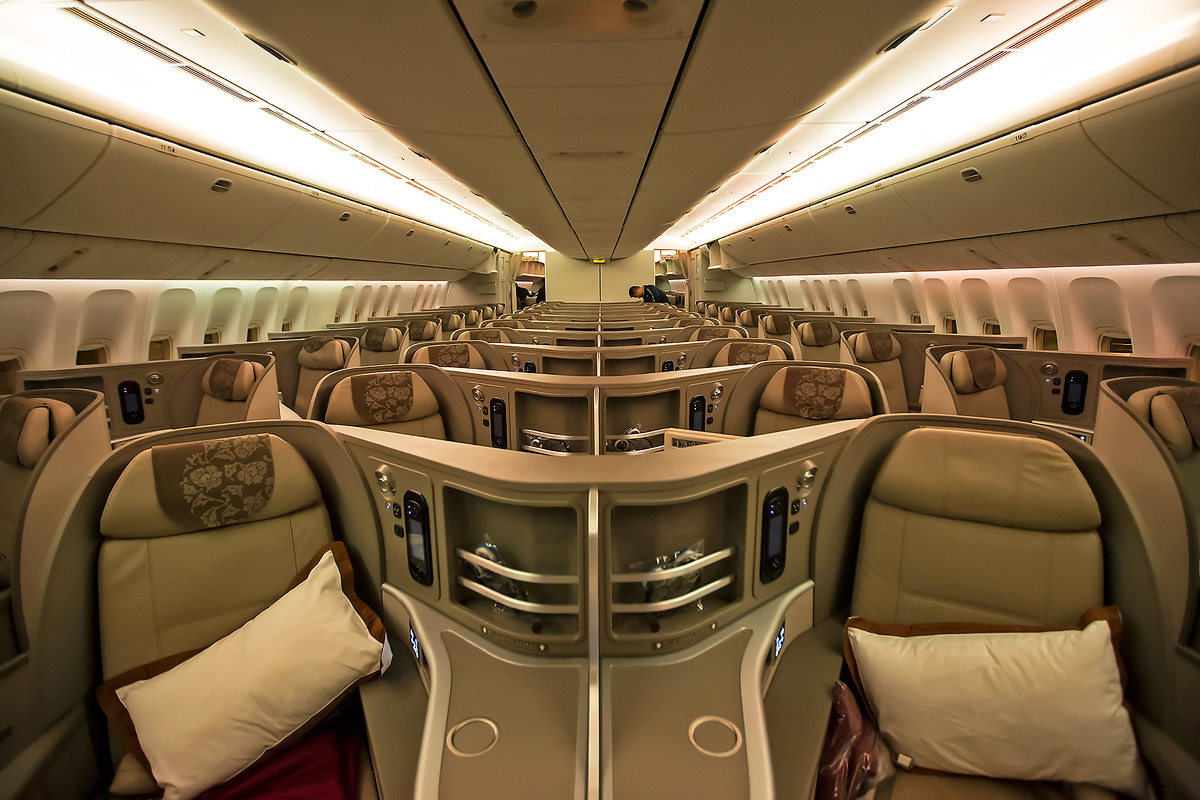
China Eastern Airlines Reverse herringbone seating aboard the Boeing 777.

Reverse herringbone seating is similar to herringbone, but with passengers angled towards the cabin windows rather than the aisle. Launched by JPA Design in December 2009, the US Airways A330-200 was the first cabin to feature reverse herringbone seats. Reverse herringbone seating is increasingly being adopted in business class cabins as airlines phase out older seats.

Staggered herringbone seating is used for narrower-bodied aircraft and has the top side section of one seat touching the top of another seat.
