= De Echte Bakker =

Dutch bakery organization

De Echte Bakker (usually written De Echte Bakker - means: "The Real Baker") is an organisation of traditional bakeries in the Netherlands, comprising approximately 230 members.

The term itself means 'The Real Baker', and, according to the organization, members must meet a minimum quality requirement. It is financially supported by franchising, and by sales of its distinctive cake-tins and children's books.

In 2002 the logo was changed from the traditional square design showing the figure of the anthropomorphic Echte Bakker, to a skewed version showing the face alone.
