= Alice Kelly =

Irish baker and social media personality

- From Scratch Baker logo
- Born: 2004 (age 21–22)
- Education: TU Dublin
- Occupations: Baker, social media personality
- Years active: 2022–present

TikTok information
- Page: fromscratchbaker
- Years active: 2022–present
- Followers: 2 million

YouTube information
- Channel: fromscratchbaker
- Years active: 2022–present
- Subscribers: 1.62 million
- Last updated: 19 September 2026

Alice Kelly, also known as the From Scratch Baker, is an Irish Kildare-based baker and social media personality. She is known for producing comedy videos on TikTok and YouTube. She is also known for converting a horse box into a bakery truck.

== Biography ==
In 2022, Kelly was gifted a horse box from the 1960s for her 18th birthday which she converted into a bakery truck. Kelly posted her plan to convert the horse box on TikTok where she gained roughly 100,000 followers in the same week. The conversion took 5 months and which was documented on her TikTok page. Kelly learned how to renovate the horse box by watching tutorials on YouTube. Following this, Kelly continued posting videos to TikTok where she gained over 1 million followers.

In May 2025, Kelly was a judge for Gala Retail and Virgin Media Television's National Best Baker Competition. In August, Kelly was diagnosed with haemochromatosis and talked about it on an interview with RTÉ Radio 1. Later that month, Kelly became an ambassador for Breast Cancer Ireland's Bake It Pink initiative after a benign tumor was removed from her breast 2 years prior.
