= Millet wine =

Type of alcoholic beverage

Millet wine (Chinese: 小米酒; pinyin: Xiǎomǐ jiǔ) is a common wine in East and Southeast Asia. It is also the oldest wine in Taiwan and a traditional beverage of Taiwanese aborigines. It is often used in harvest festivals, as a symbol of harvest.

== Cultural background ==
For aboriginal culture, millet wine is a cultural symbol. Millet wine is a key part of aboriginal rituals such as Millet Festival, Black Rice Festival, Harvest Festival and Dwarf Spiritual Sacrifice (Pas-ta'ai). Each aboriginal group in Taiwan has its own god or goddess dedicated to millet and their own name for millet wine. For example, the Atayal tribe call it “Qohozi” and the Puyuma tribe call it "Tinuerau". Libation of millet wine is believed to bring good luck and aid in avoiding evil. Every aboriginal group has developed specific millet wine drinking rites. For instance, the Paiwan tribespeople will tread the ground before drinking millet wine to show their respect to the god in charge of the mountains. On the other hand, Puyuma tribespeople of Taitung County take fresh millet wine to the beach. Priests then chant prayers toward the direction of Orchid Island to present their gratitude for their harvest.

== Production ==
Millet wine is made from millet, brewer's yeast and water. In traditional production, tools such as sieves, steamers, pots, pans and jars are used. Millet is immersed in cold water and left to rest during the night. The next morning, the millet is washed with care so as not to squeeze it. The common proportion is about 400 cc per pound of millet. The washed millet is steamed and then mixed with brewer's yeast and cold water which was boiled beforehand. Finally, the mix is put into a container and the opening is sealed. It is left to ferment in a cool place about one month.

== See also ==
- Ma La Sun (wine)
