= Coupe du Monde de la Boulangerie =

International baking competition held in France

The Coupe du Monde de la Boulangerie (English: Bakery World Cup) is an international, invitational artisan baking competition held in Paris, France, every three to four years.

== History ==
Begun in 1992 by Christian Vabret, president of the Ecole Française de Boulangerie d'Aurillac, to reverse what he considered to be a decline in bread quality, the Coupe du Monde is a competition where bakers who practice the craft of artisan baking compete against teams from other nations, using traditional techniques. The purpose of the competition is to gather artisan bakers from around the world to celebrate their profession, share knowledge of artisan baking techniques, and reinstate the value of the artisan baking profession.

Also known as the World Cup of Baking, the Coupe du Monde de la Boulangerie is held in conjunction with Europain, an international bakery, patisserie, and catering exhibition attracting more than 80,000 visitors. Teams from 12 countries are invited to compete in the Coupe du Monde de la Boulangerie, based upon their rankings in regional competitions. Countries whose teams placed first, second, and third in the previous Coupe du Monde de la Bounlangerie are automatically guaranteed a place in the next Coupe du Monde.

Each team is made up of three members, and each person specializes in one of the major Coupe du Monde categories: Baguettes & Specialty Breads, Artistic Design, and Viennoiserie. Team members must also work together to produce a sandwich presentation for a fourth category, Savory Selection. Teams are evaluated by international judging committees on the basis of individual excellence in artisan baking, as well as on teamwork and time management.
